= History of the French Navy =

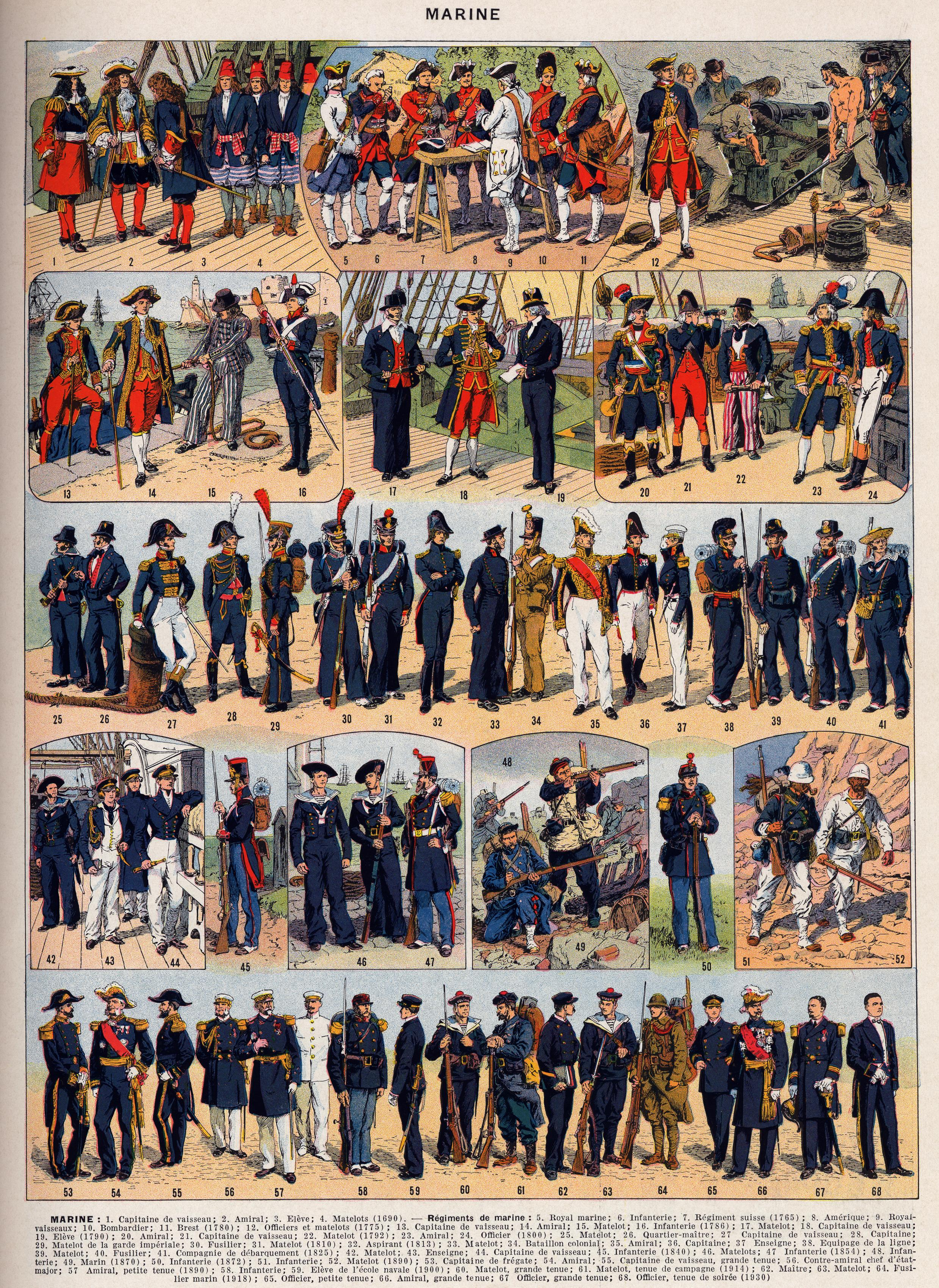
Uniforms of French naval officers and sailors from 1690 to 1930.

Although the history of the French Navy goes back to the Middle Ages, its history can be said to effectively begin with Richelieu under Louis XIII.

Since the establishment of her present territory, France had to face three major challenges on the naval level:

- Geographically France had two large sections of coastline separated by the Iberian Peninsula (Spain and Portugal), so she had to keep two naval forces and divide resources between the Mediterranean Sea and the Atlantic Ocean.
- Politically and strategically France's main threats came overland from Central Europe which required a strong army rather than a strong navy.
- Inconsistent support for her navy. To be effective, navies require infrastructure, ports, dockyards, foundries which must be maintained in peacetime. Officers and crews need plenty of experience at sea. Shortage of resources and political misunderstanding repeatedly damaged the service, creating a series of brilliant eras followed by disasters.

The history of the French Navy can be divided into the following eras:

- The creation of the first actual State Navy, under Louis XIII, thanks to the politics of Richelieu. This navy was largely ruined by the troubles of the Fronde.
- A rebuilt and brilliant era under Louis XIV, largely thanks to Jean-Baptiste Colbert. The effort was not pursued under the Régence of Philippe d'Orléans and the beginning of the reign of Louis XV; consequently, the Seven Years' War and the French and Indian War ended in disaster.
- A period of rebirth under the direction of Étienne François de Choiseul, Duke of Choiseul, which culminated under Louis XVI with de Grasse's victory at the Battle of the Chesapeake during the American Revolutionary War. In the same period, explorers like Bougainville expanded French geography, naval maps, and founded outposts. The downfall occurred during the French Revolution and the First Empire, leaving the British with undisputed control of the seas (see French Imperial Navy).
- Under Napoleon III, a modern navy was built, taking advantage of new technologies like steam and ship armour, which made older fleets effectively obsolete. This force was an important instrument in the constitution and keeping of the French Empire. The fleet maintained a high standard, and between the two world wars (1925–1939), a significant effort was made counter the threat of the German and Italian navies. With the Fall of France in 1940, most of the Navy never got a chance to fight. What survived Mers-el-Kebir was eventually annihilated in the scuttling of the French fleet at Toulon.

== Name ==
The French Navy is affectionately known as La Royale ("the Royal"). The reason for this nickname is uncertain. Speculation includes: it might be for its traditional attachment to the French monarchy; because, before being named "nationale", the Navy had been named "royale" (the navy did not sport the royal titles common with other European navies like the British Royal Navy); or simply because of the location of its headquarters, rue Royale in Paris.

== Middle Ages ==
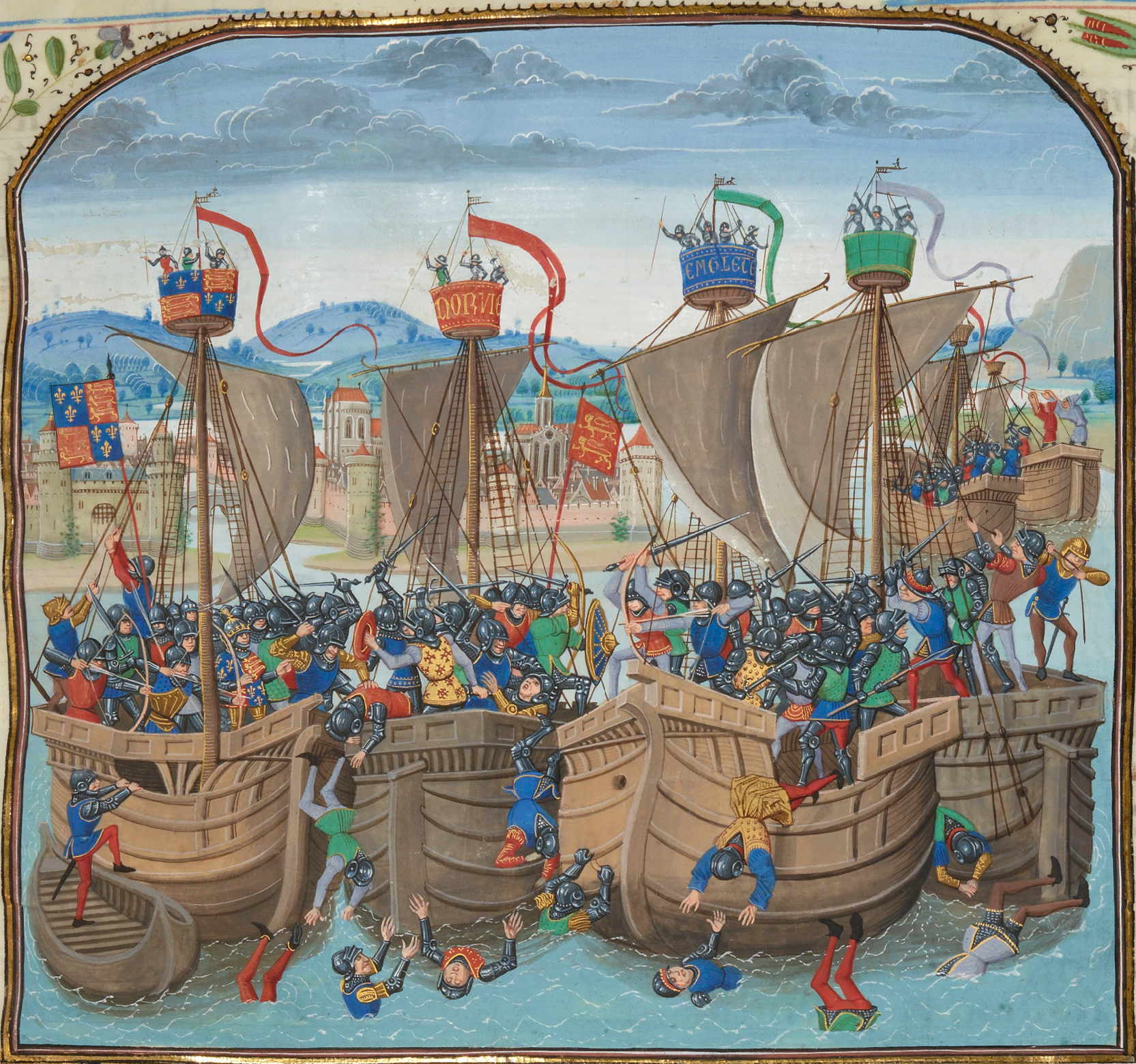
15th-century miniature of the Battle of Sluys

Medieval fleets, in France as elsewhere, were almost entirely composed of merchant ships enlisted into naval service in time of war. But the early beginning of the French navy goes back to the Middle Ages, when it defeated the English navy at the Battle of Arnemuiden, on 23 September 1338. The Battle of Arnemuiden was also the first naval battle using artillery. The most notable naval battle fought by the French during the Middle Ages was the Battle of Sluys, where the English navy inflicted a crushing defeat; the French lost almost 200 ships and up to 20,000 men killed or drowned while the English lost only 2 ships and 600 men.

== Louis XIII and Richelieu ==
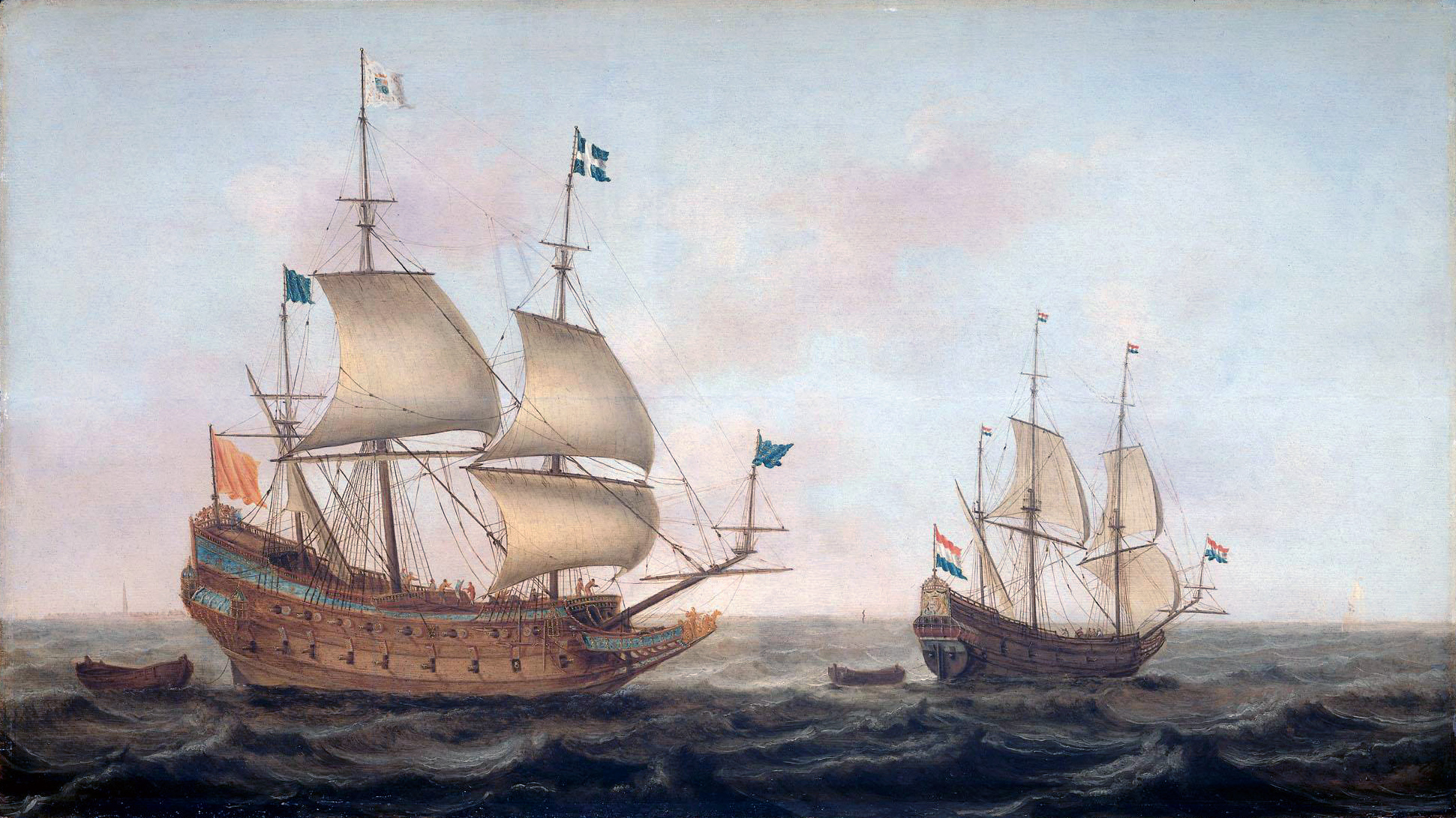
17th-century painting of a French warship being guided by a Dutch vessel

The tears of our sovereigns have the salted taste of the sea that they ignored.

— Cardinal Richelieu

During the reign of Henry IV, France was in an unstable state, and striving to guarantee her independence from Spanish and papal influences. This prompted both an emphasis on land forces, which drained resources, and an alliance with England, which would have unfavourably seen France challenging her naval supremacy. When Richelieu became Minister of the Navy, he decided on a plan to rebuild a powerful navy, divided into two distinct forces.

The Mediterranean force was to be completely composed of galleys, to take advantage of the relatively calm sea. Initially, the plan called for 40 galleys, but was downsized to 24 of them, notably because of a lack of galley slaves — each galley was 400 or 500 slave strong.

The oceanic force was to be composed of men-of-war. The designs were moderately large ships, for a lack of harbours fit for very large units, but very heavily armed with large calibre guns; these ships displaced between 300 and 2000 tonnes and bore up to 50 24-pound cannons, firing 150mm-round shots. The first ships were ordered from the Dutch, and French production started with the famous Couronne, a prestige ship typical of this era.

In 1627, the Navy was not ready to challenge the English fleet at the Siege of La Rochelle, which led to the construction of a seawall to establish a blockade. Fleets of this period were often largely composed of merchant vessels, hastily loaded with cannons, undercrewed and poorly handled.

With newly built ships, designed as ships of war and crewed by sailors and trained gunners, fighting experience was gained in the Franco-Spanish War and the Thirty Years' War with notable victories at the Battle of Cádiz (1640) won by France's first Grand Admiral Jean Armand de Maillé-Brézé, son of Marshall Urbain de Maillé-Brézé and nephew of Cardinal Richelieu. The Navy built a French empire, conquering the "Nouvelle-Guyenne" (now Acadia), "Nouvelle France" (now Canada), Tortuga, Martinique, Guadeloupe, several other islands in the Caribbean, the Bahamas, and Madagascar.

== Louis XIV and Colbert ==
Under the tutelage of the "Sun King," the French Navy was well financed and equipped, managing to score several early victories in the Nine Years' War against the Royal Navy and the Dutch Navy. Financial troubles, however, forced the navy back to port and allowed the English and the Dutch to regain the initiative. Under the impulsion of Jean-Baptiste Colbert's ambitious policy of ship building, the French Navy began to gain a magnificence matching the symbolism of the Louis XIV era, as well as an actual military significance. The ship of the line Soleil Royal is illustrative of the trend of the time. Colbert is credited with forging a good part of the naval tradition of France. The French Navy of this period was also in the forefront of the development of naval tactics. Paul Hoste (1652–1700) produced the first major work on naval tactics. Before the Nine Years' War, in the Franco-Dutch War, the French Navy managed to score a decisive victory over a combined Spanish-Dutch fleet at the Battle of Palermo (1676).

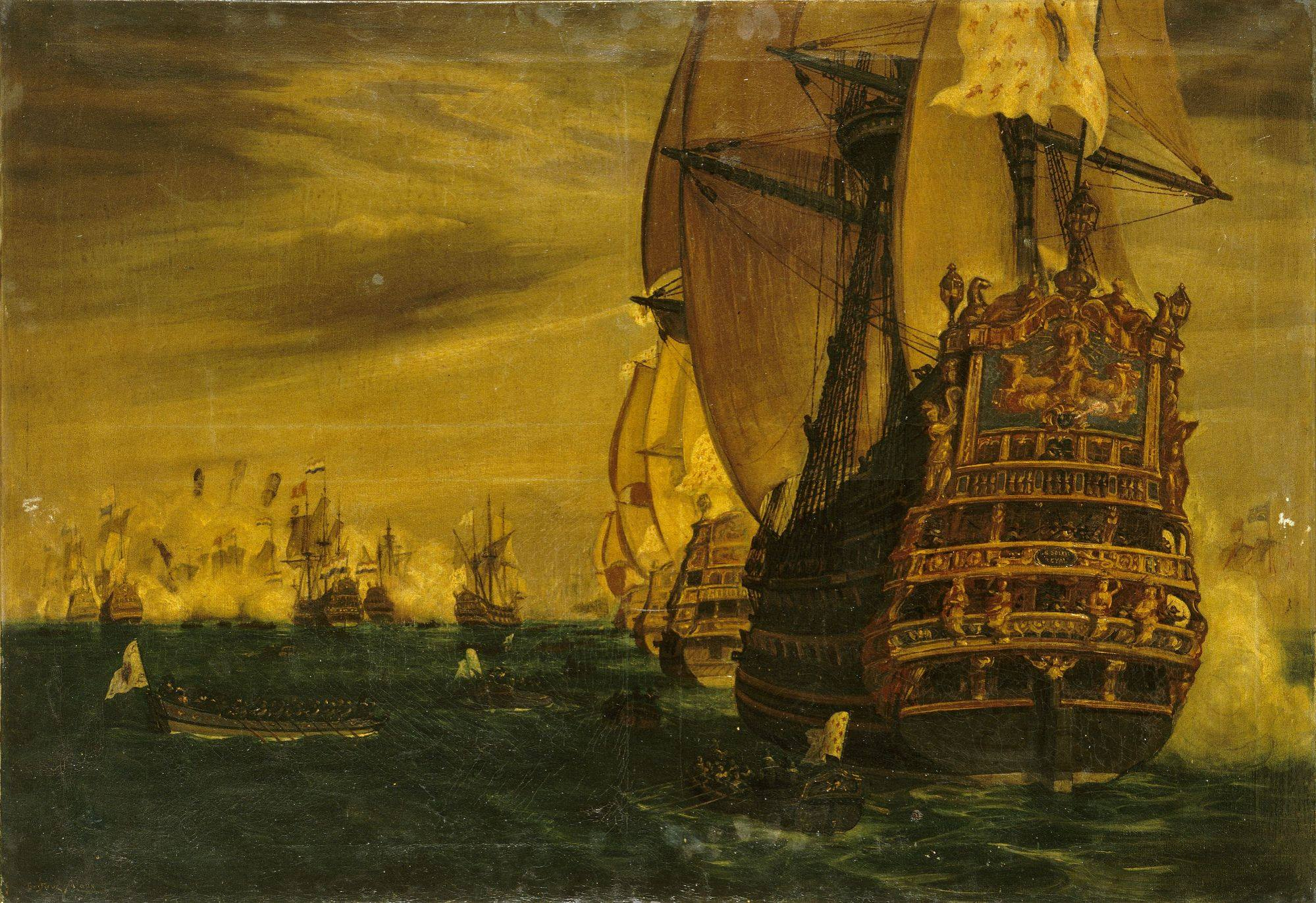
The Battle of Beachy Head, the greatest French naval victory of the Nine Years' War

During the Nine Years' War, Admiral Anne Hilarion de Tourville won a significant victory in the Battle of Beachy Head, by which France gained control of the English Channel. The event is regarded as one of the most glorious deeds of the French Navy, and Tourville earned a fame which lasts to present times (a number of ships were named Bévezier or Tourville to commemorate the battle).The Battles of Barfleur and La Hougue in 1692 saw a French fleet engage an Anglo-Dutch fleet, with both sides suffering heavily. However, once wind and tide changed, the French suffered heavily as they tried to get back to port for repairs. Some of the damaged French ships were forced to beach themselves at Cherbourg, where they were annihilated by English long boats and with fire ships. The crews were saved, but the lost fifteen ships of the line were not replaced and France did not seriously challenge the combined English and Dutch fleet for decades. France turned to commerce-raiding rather than large fleet actions with great success under such captains as Jean Bart, Claude de Forbin and René Duguay-Trouin.

== Louis XV ==
Until what the British called the Annus Mirabilis of 1759, the French and British navies had a roughly even record of success in their many conflicts. This changed decisively in that year with a series of disasters for the French, who had begun the year planning to invade Britain. The British responded by blockading the French fleets at both Toulon and Brest; when the French emerged they were decisively defeated in the battles of Lagos, Portugal and Quiberon Bay. The French Navy was also unable to prevent the loss of the important colonies of New France (Quebec) and Guadeloupe. The year marked the beginning of the period of clear British dominance on the seas.

Following the disasters of the Seven Years' War, France was financially incapable of building up a fleet to challenge Britain's Royal Navy. However, efforts were made, and by the time of Louis XV's death in 1774, the Marine Royale was somewhat larger than it had been in 1763, and, crucially, had replaced numerous old vessels with more effective modern designs. Also worthy of note: in 1766, Bougainville led the first French circumnavigation of the world.

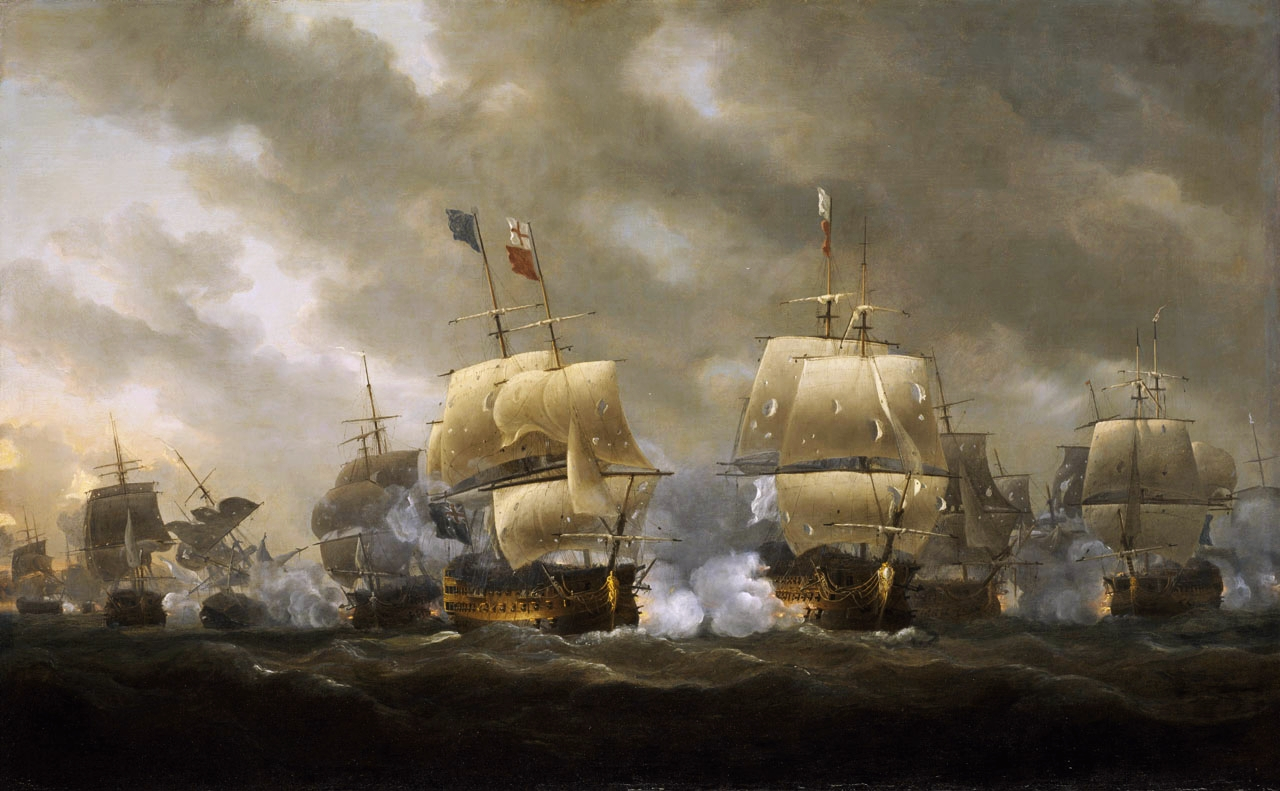
Soleil-Royal (1749)

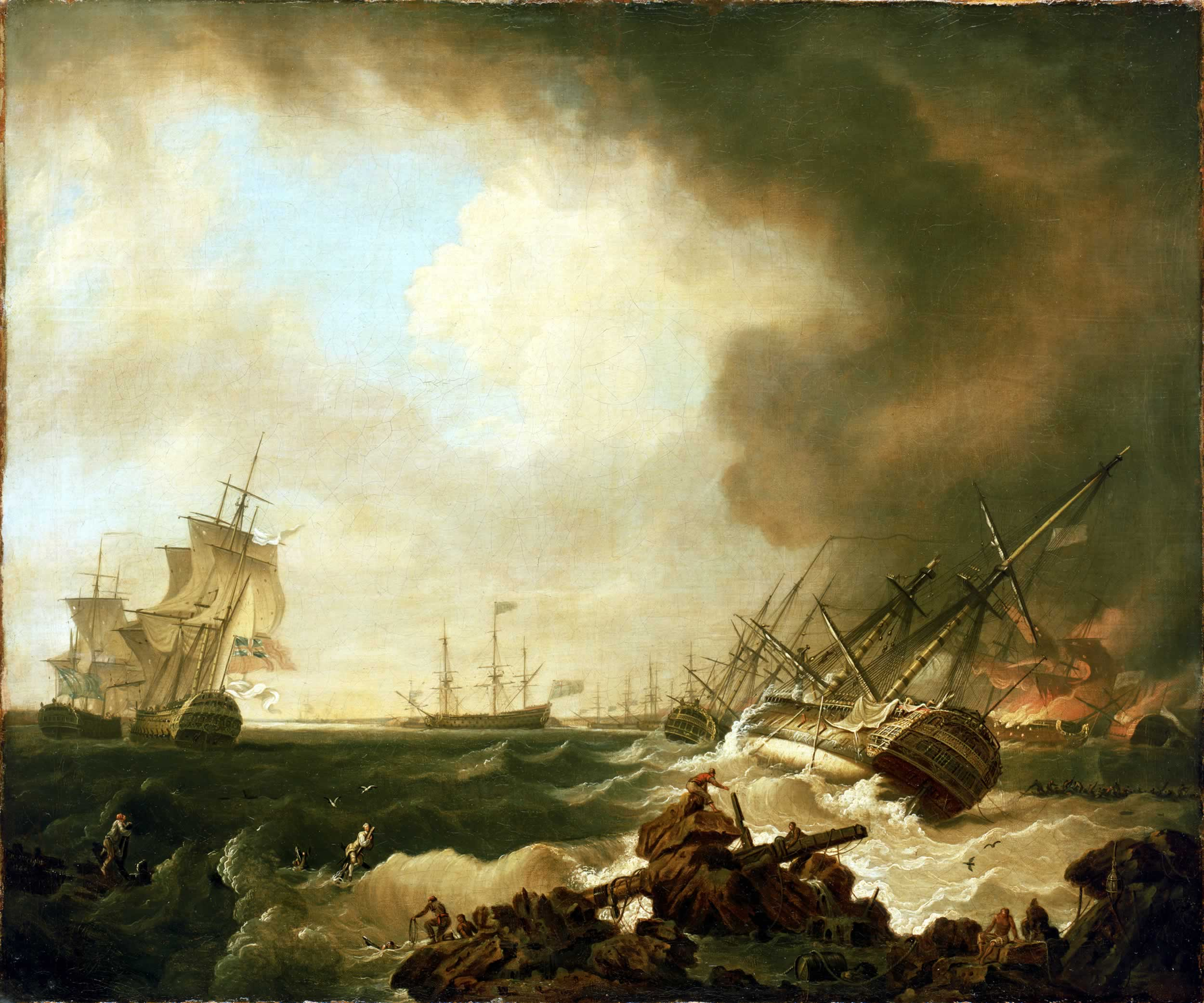
Héros (1752)

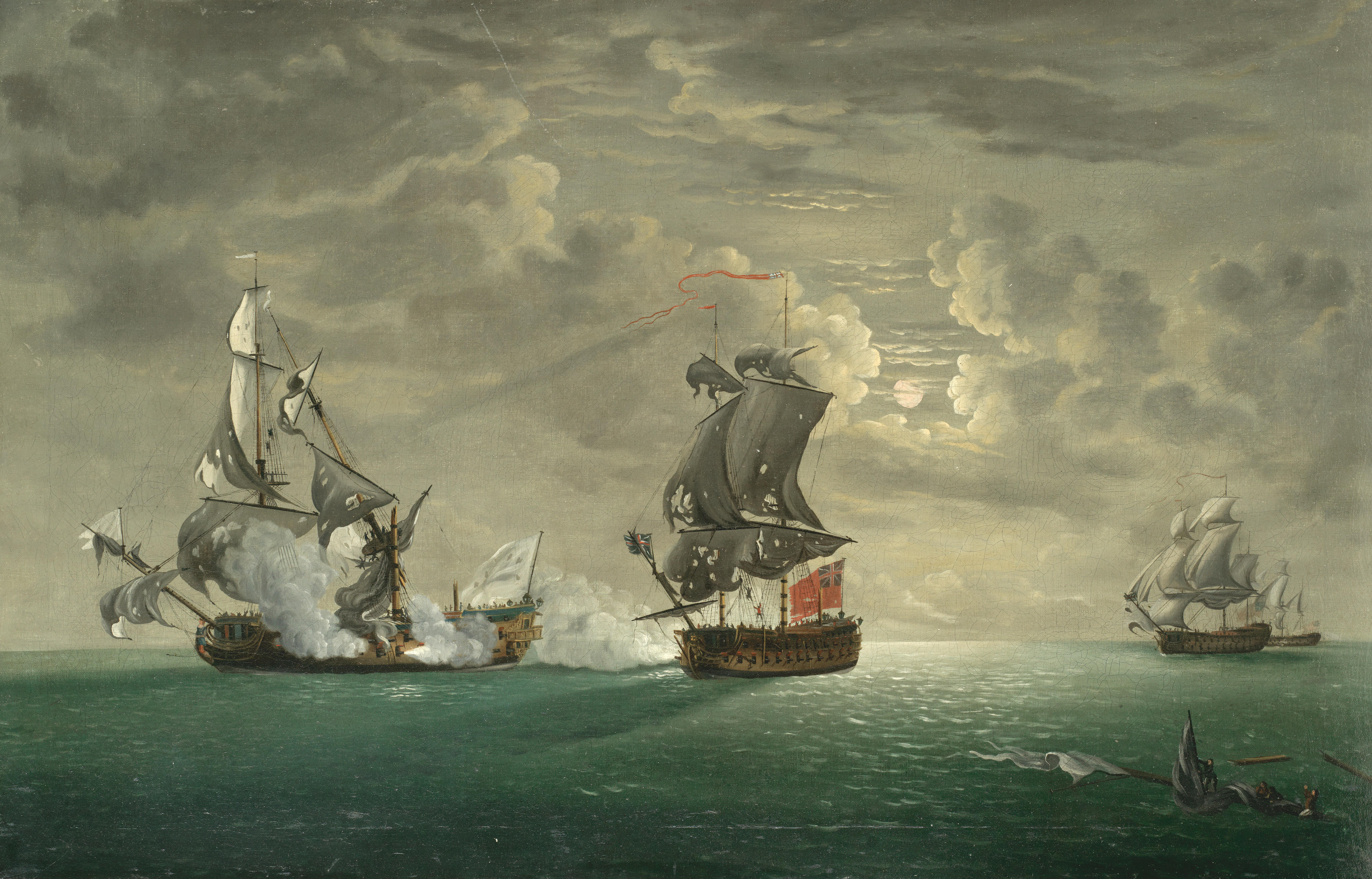
Foudroyant (1751)

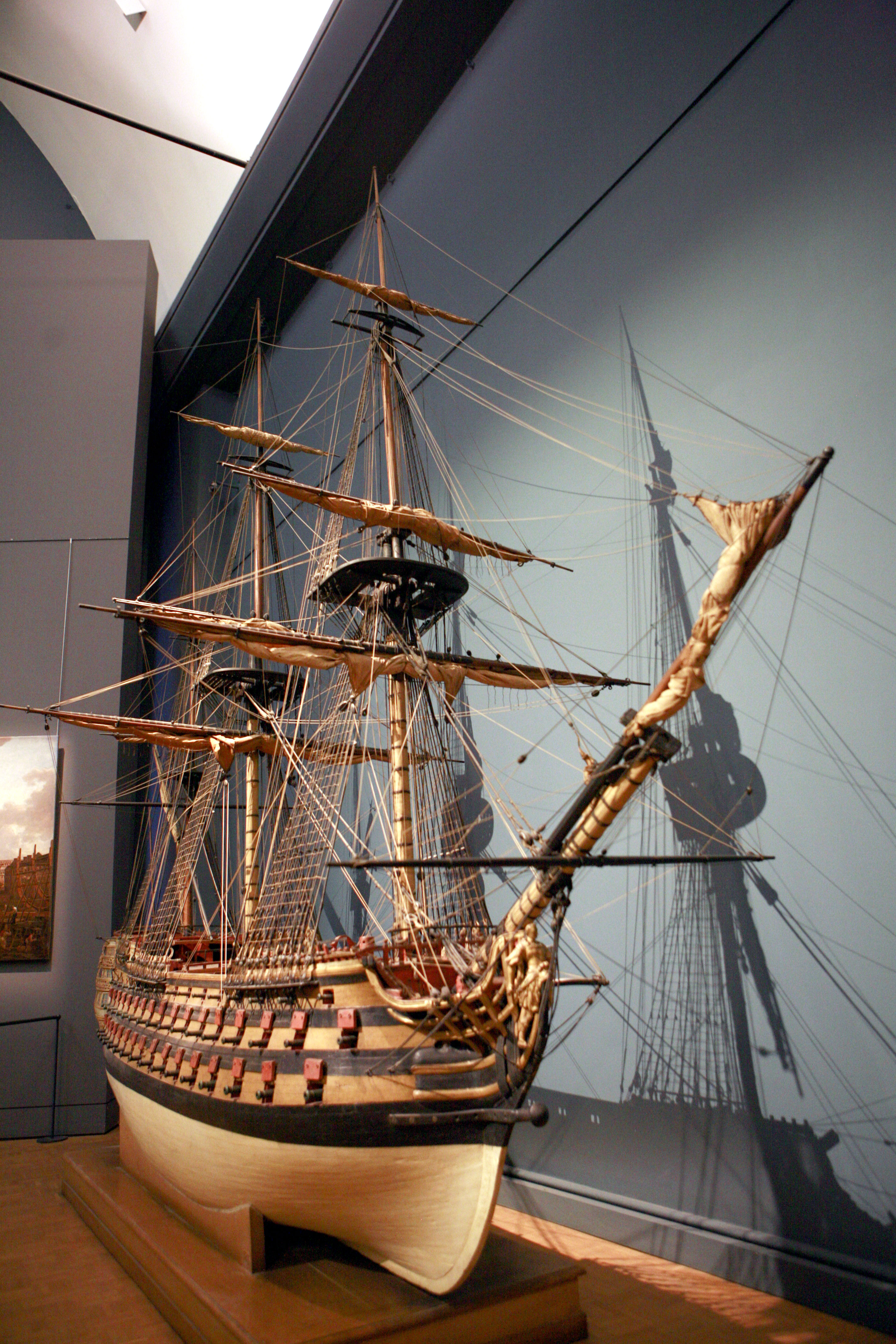
Royal Louis (1759)

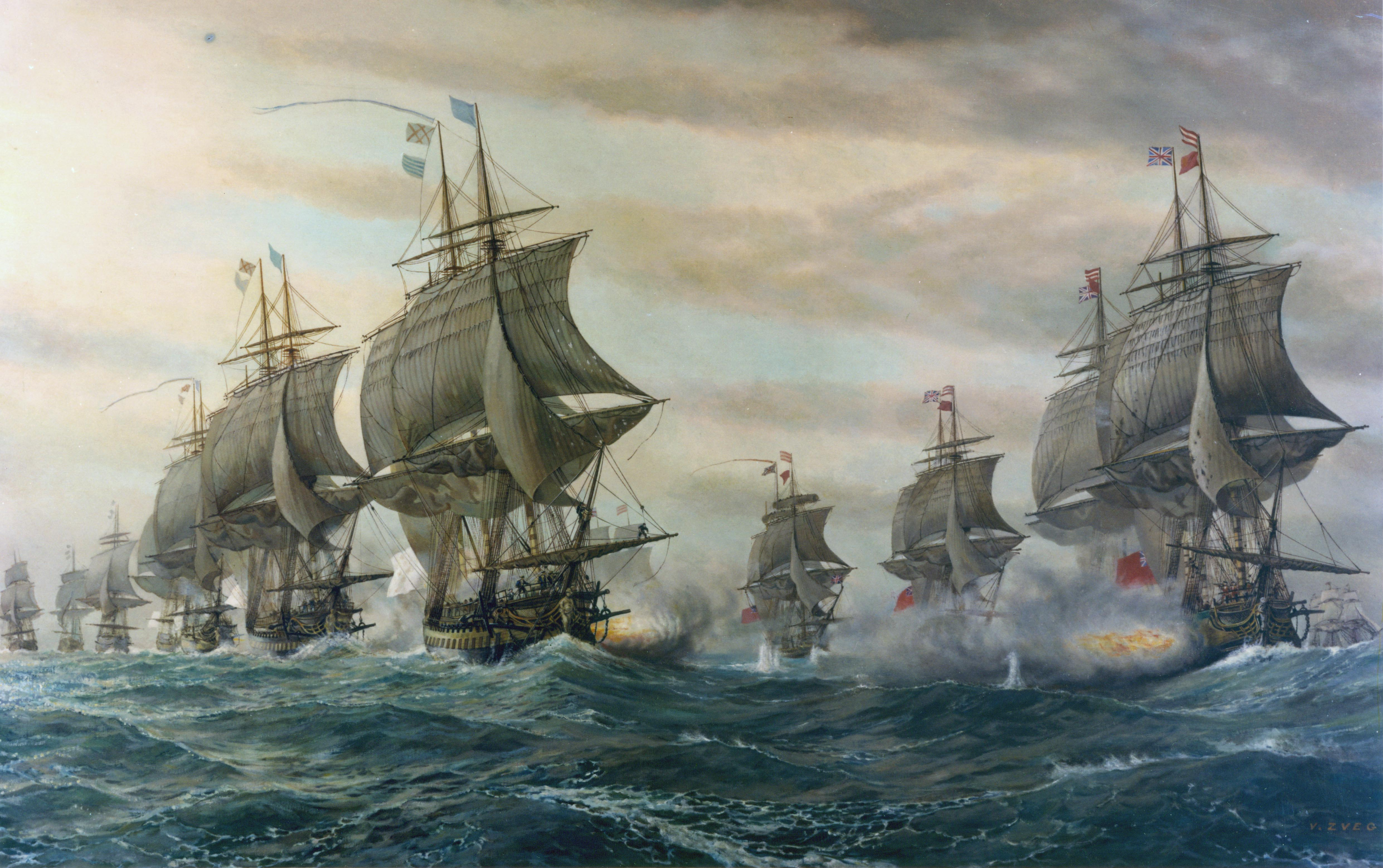
Ville de Paris (1764)

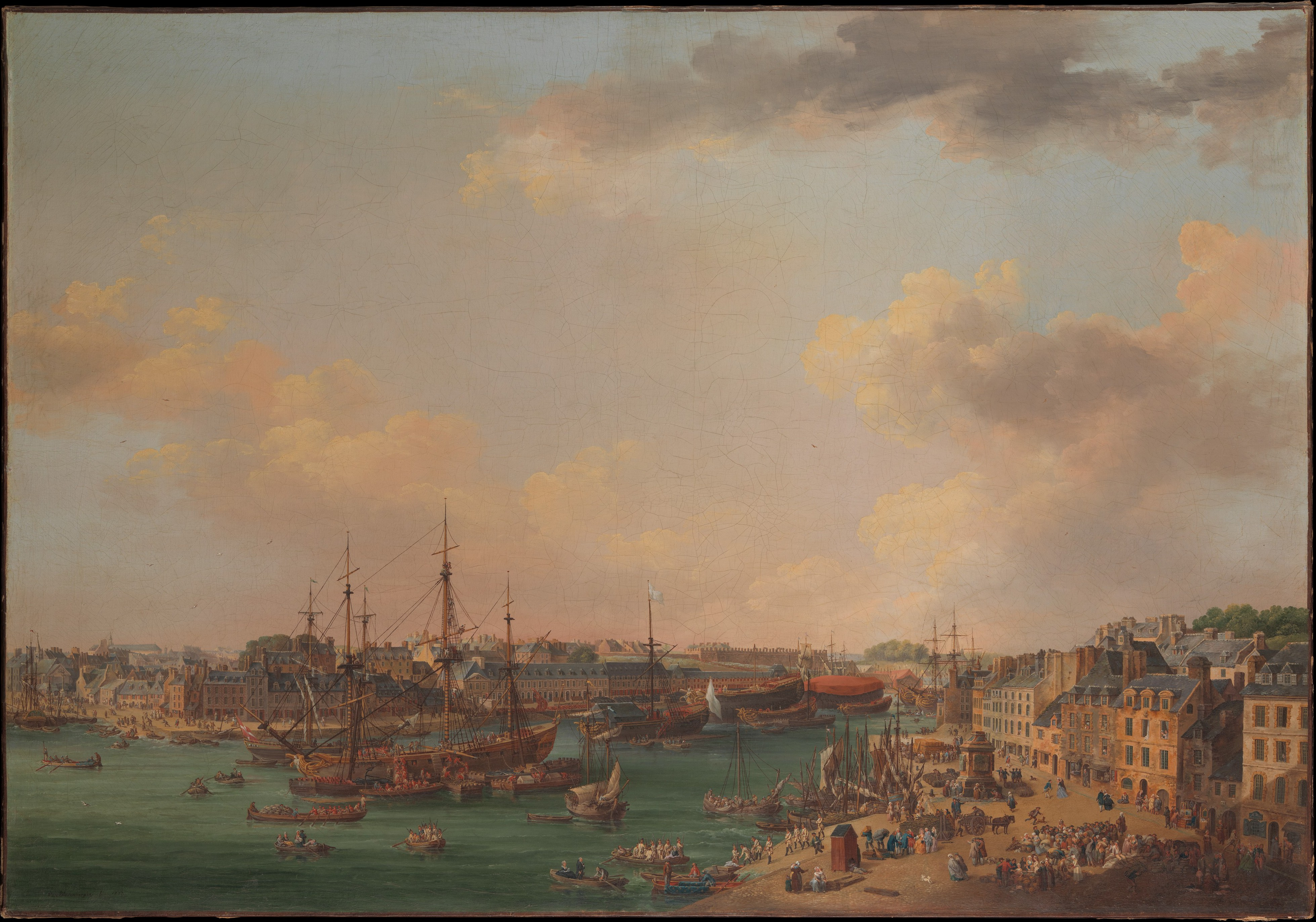
1777 painting The Outer Harbor of Brest, showing the French port of Brest. The work was produced in order to show the successful rebuilding of French naval facilities in Brest during the 1760s and 1770s.

== Louis XVI ==
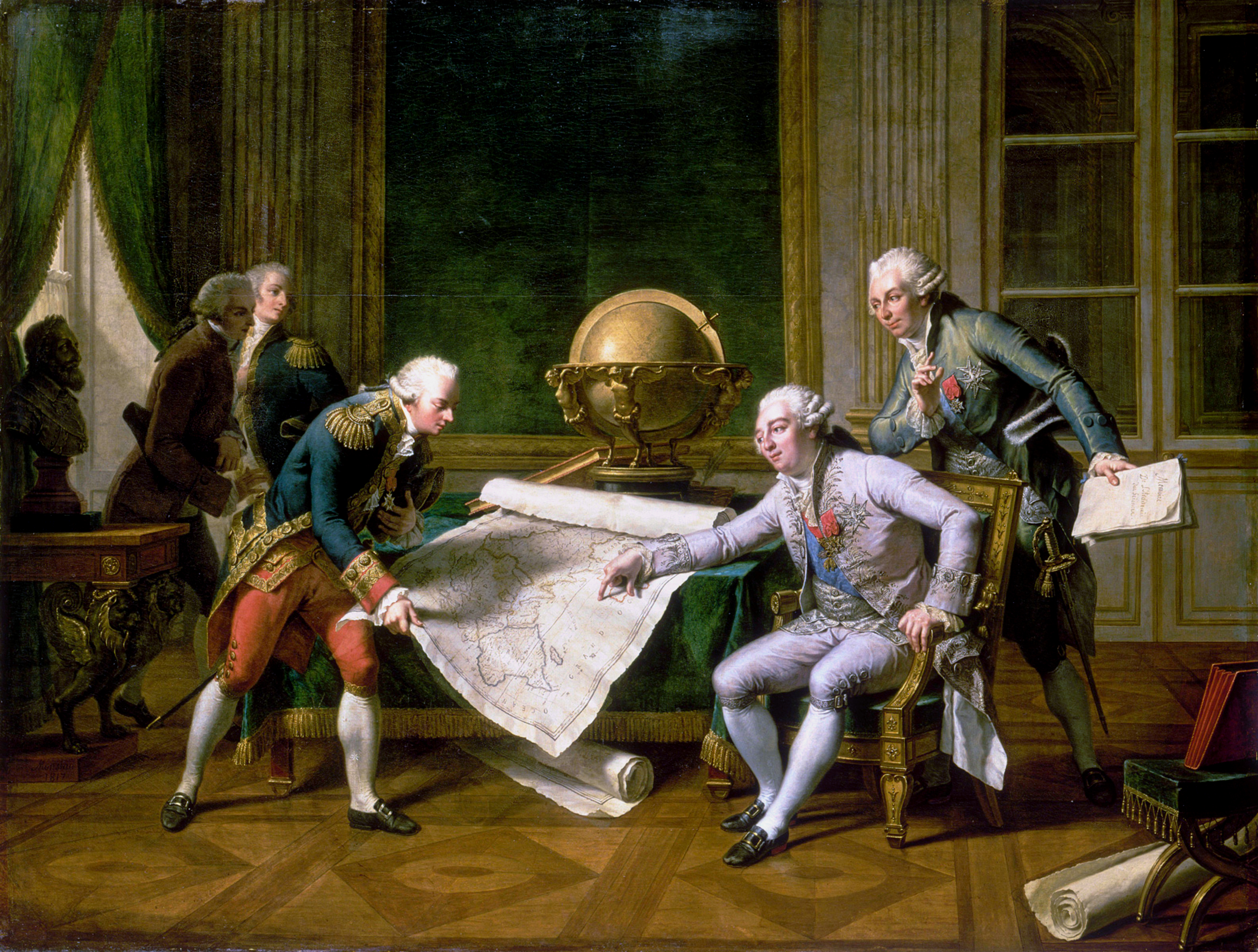
Louis XVI Giving His Instructions to La Pérouse (1817)

King Louis XVI was keen on technical subjects and geography, and encouraged explorations including the commissioning of Jean-François de Galaup, comte de Lapérouse to undertake far reaching voyages of discovery. (L’expédition de Lapérouse, 1785–1788, réplique française au voyage de Cook). Upon King Louis XVI's orders, Lapérouse departed Brest, France, in command of Astrolabe and Boussole on 1 August 1785 on a scientific voyage of the Pacific inspired by the voyages of James Cook. He never returned and his ships were later found wrecked at the island of Vanikoro, which is part of the isolated Santa Cruz group of islands in the South Pacific. Vessels designed by French engineer Jacques-Noël Sané started being constructed during the American Revolutionary War. He created what were to be, in effect, the ultimate designs of wind-powered fighting ship, with standard frigates carrying 18-pounder guns, and standard ships of the line of 64, 74, 80 and 118 guns; his 74-gun ship of the line became the backbone of the French and British navies. The largest units, the 118-guns, were said to be "as manoeuvrable as a frigate" (the Océan class is a typical example).

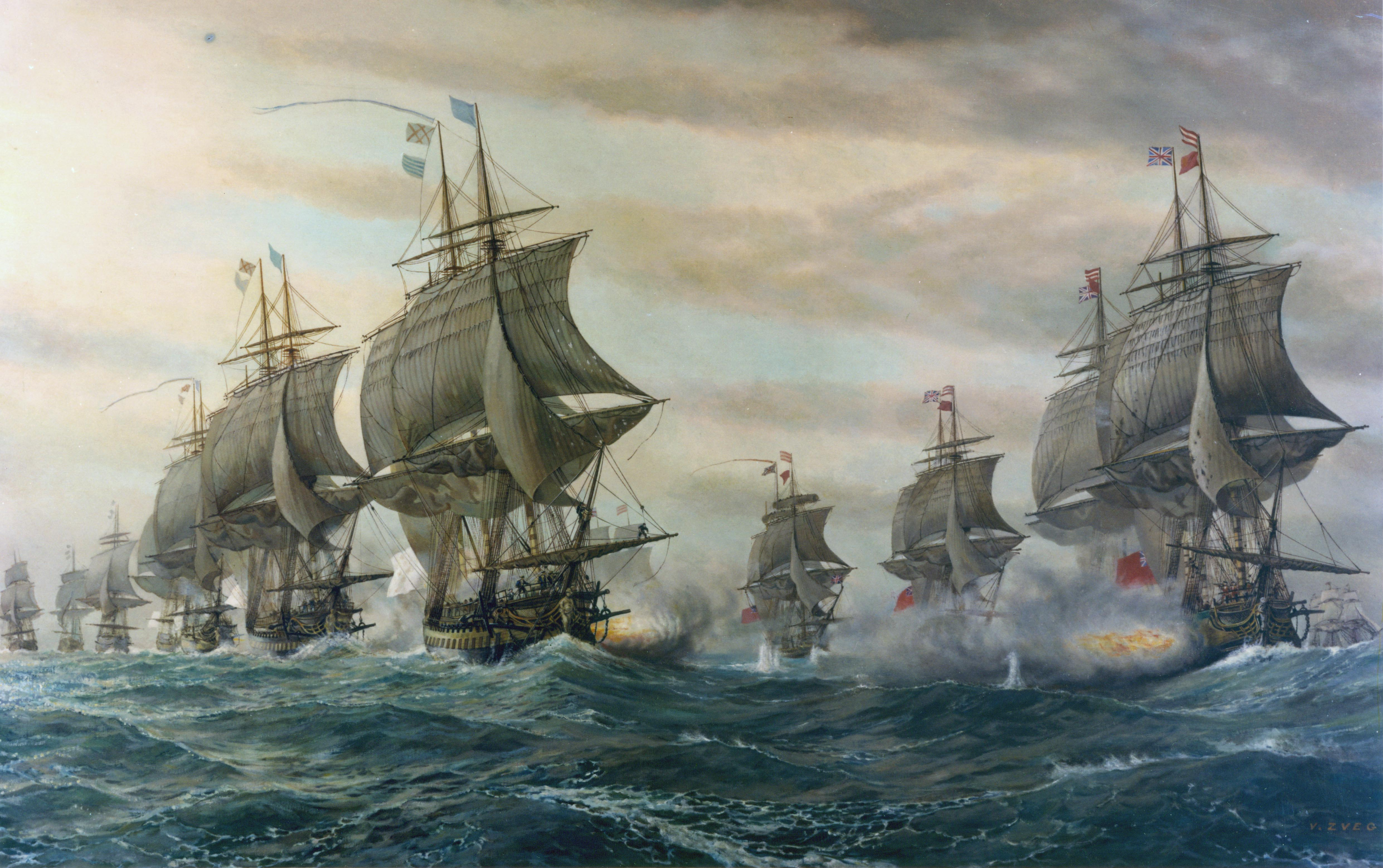
The Battle of the Chesapeake, the French navy's greatest victory of the American Revolutionary War

During the American War of Independence the French Navy played a decisive role in supporting the American side. The French Navy was the only standing navy to fight the British, alongside the modest Continental and American state navies and American privateers. In a hard-fought effort, the French under de Grasse managed to repulse a British fleet at the Battle of the Chesapeake in 1781, ensuring that the Franco-American ground forces would win the ongoing Battle of Yorktown. The career of de Grasse ended when he was captured during the decisive French defeat at the 1782 Battle of the Saintes.

In India, Pierre André de Suffren fought in a series of campaigns against the British (1770–1780), contending for supremacy against Vice-Admiral Sir Edward Hughes. In 1789, the French Navy had 71 ships of the line, 64 frigates, 45 corvettes and 32 smaller units; a further 12 ships of the line and 10 frigates were under construction and expected to be launched within the year. The crews counted 75,000 sailors, 5,000 gunners, 2,000 officers and 14,000 Fusiliers Marins. Ships were based mostly in Brest, Toulon and Rochefort, and in Lorient, Le Havre, Dunkerque, Bordeaux, Bayonne and Marseille.

== French Revolution and the First Empire ==
The French Revolution, in eliminating numerous officers of noble lineage (among them, Charles d'Estaing), all but crippled the French Navy. The National Convention dissolved the Fleet Gunners Corps, which effectively put a halt to the training in gunnery, abysmally degrading the rate of fire and precision of batteries; in addition, the French doctrine was to fire at the rigging of enemy ships to disable them; this doctrine could prove effective with highly trained crews, but was impractical with poorly trained gunners, and resulted in a number of instances where French ships did not manage to score a single hit on dangerously exposed British ships (as happened with the fight of the Ça Ira, or at the beginning of the Battle of Trafalgar). By contrast, the Royal Navy doctrine was for their well-trained gunners to fire at the enemy's hull, a much easier target, to kill and maim the crew and gradually degrade firepower.

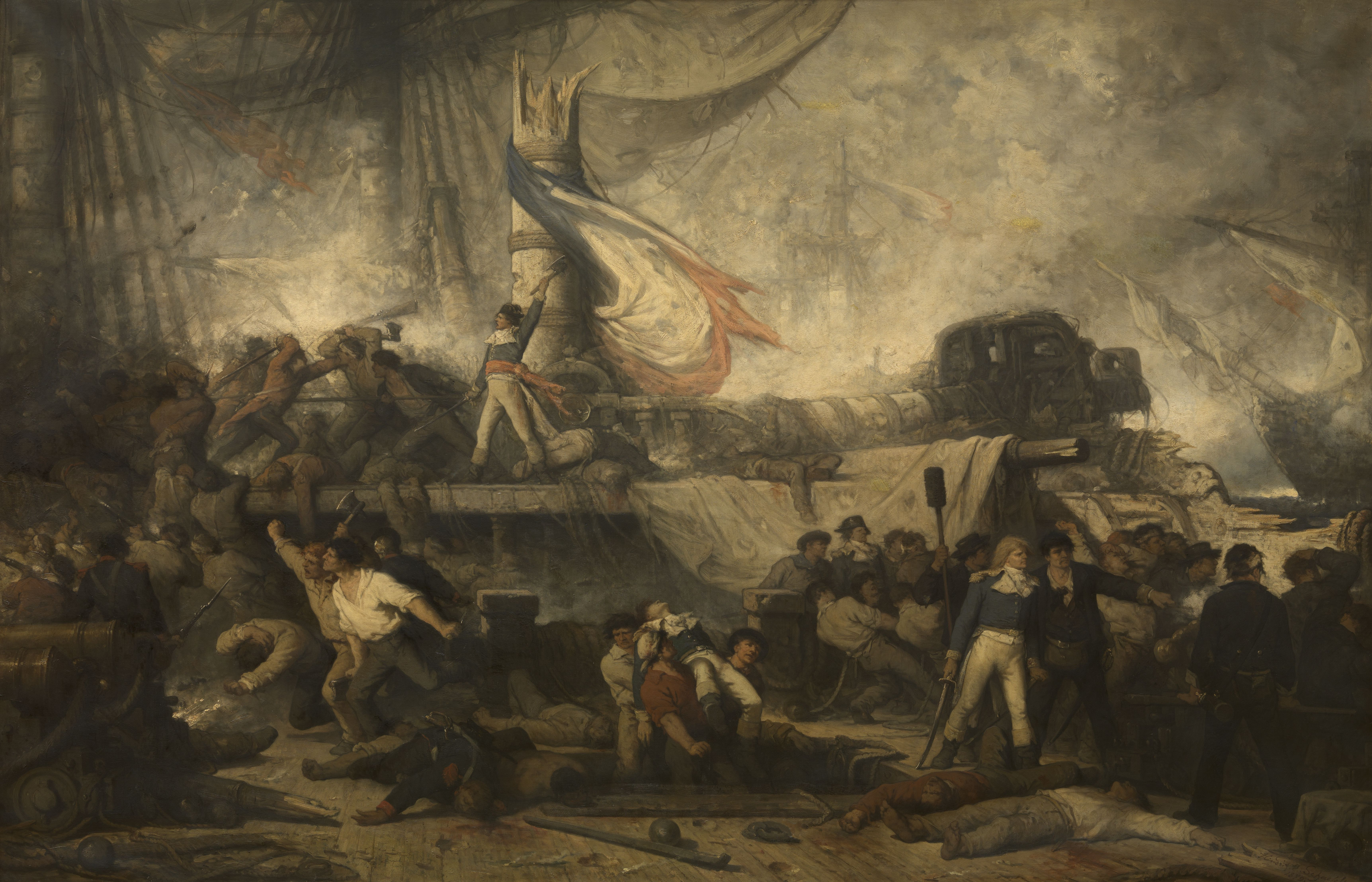
1879 painting of Algésiras at the Battle of Trafalgar

Efforts to make the navy into a powerful force under Napoleon were dashed by the death of Latouche Tréville in 1804, and the Battle of Trafalgar in 1805, where the British all but annihilated a combined Franco-Spanish fleet. The battle confirmed British naval domination during the Napoleonic Wars. From then on, the French Navy was limited to frigate actions and privateers such as Robert Surcouf. This started the French tendency to prefer large numbers of smaller but powerful and swift units, rather than large capital ships. In his 1802 work Elementary Course in Naval Tactics, the French naval officer Joseph d'Audibert de Ramatuelle outlined the French Navy's strategic thinking:

The French navy has always preferred the glory of securing or retaining a conquest to the perhaps more brilliant, but certainly less real, glory of capturing a few ships; and in this, it has come much closer to the true aim of war. In fact, what would the loss of a few vessels matter to England? The essential point is to attack her in her possessions, the immediate sources of her commercial wealth and her maritime power. The War of 1778 provides examples of the devotion of French admirals to the true interests of their country. The retention of Grenada, the capture of Yorktown, where an English army surrendered, the conquest of Saint Christopher were the results of great battles in which the enemy was allowed to withdraw unmolested rather than risk giving him a chance to relieve the attacked points.

== From the Bourbon Restoration to the Second Empire ==
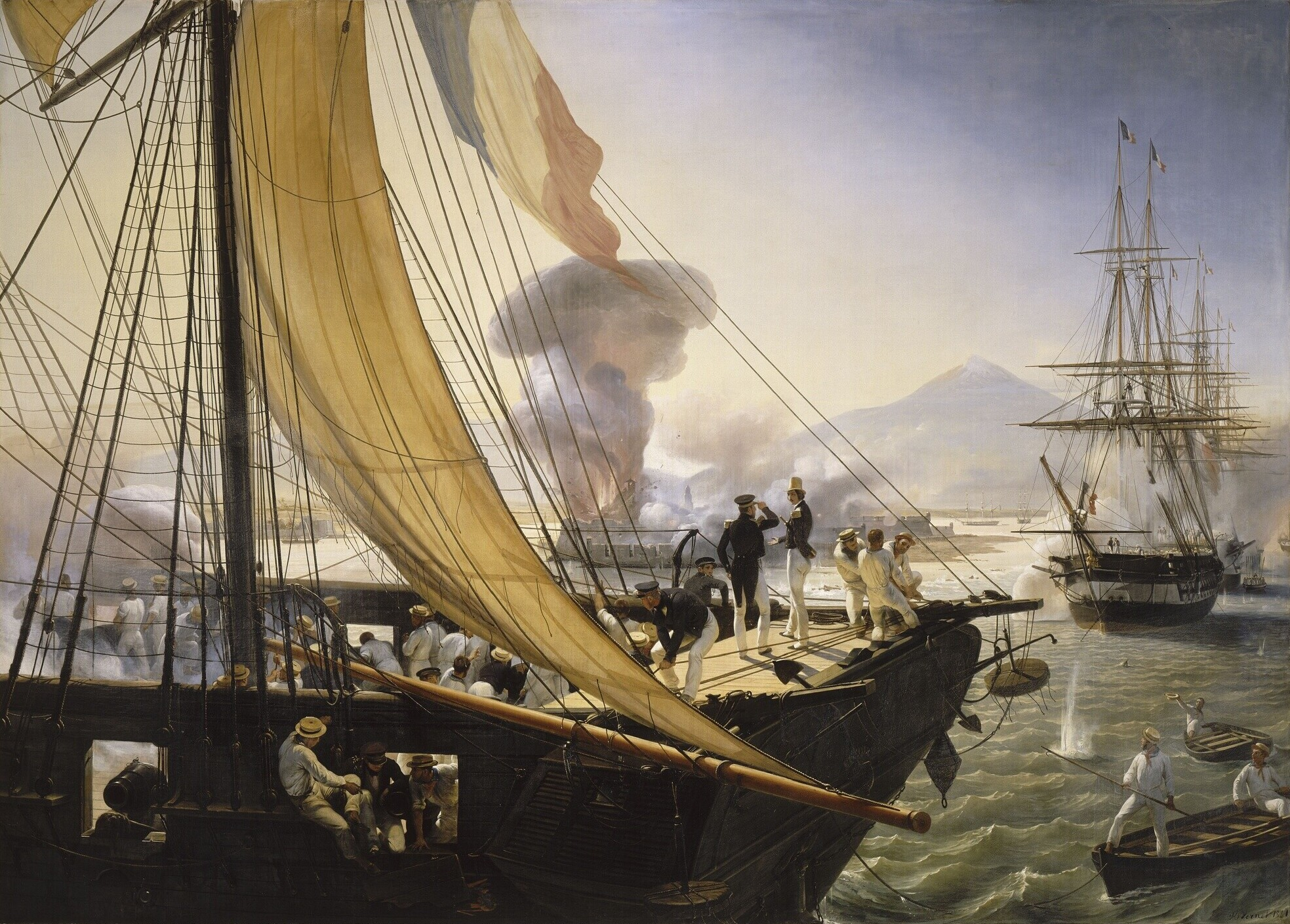
Battle of Veracruz (1838): bombing of the Castle of San Juan de Ulúa, during the Pastry War.

In the nineteenth century, the navy recovered to become the second finest in the world after the Royal Navy.

During this period, explorer and naval officer Dumont d'Urville contributed to geography in Southern and Western Pacific, Australia, New Zealand, and Antarctica, and brought back previously unknown plants and animal species.

The French Navy also conducted a successful blockade of Mexico in the Pastry War of 1838 and obliterated the Imperial Chinese Navy at the Battle of Fuzhou in 1884. It also served as an effective link between the growing parts of the French empire. The French Navy were leaders in many areas of warship development, first with incremental improvements upon existing designs with the Commission de Paris, but also pioneering the introduction of several new technologies: steam propulsion, the screw propeller, armour plate protection, steel construction, and protected gun mounts.

- France led in the development of artillery firing shells for the Navy, invented by Henri-Joseph Paixhans
- In 1850, Napoléon became the first purpose-built steam-powered battleship.
- Gloire became the first seagoing ironclad when she was launched in 1853.
- In 1863, the French Navy launched Plongeur, the first mechanically propelled submarine.
- In 1876, the Redoutable became the first steel-hulled warship.
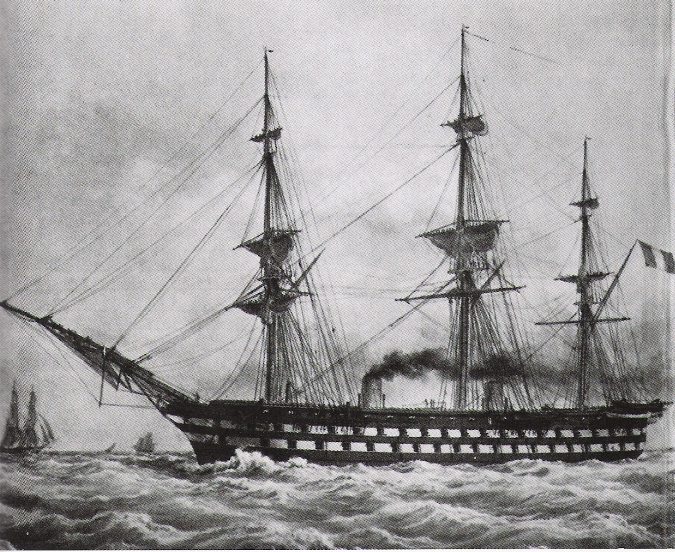
Napoléon (1850).

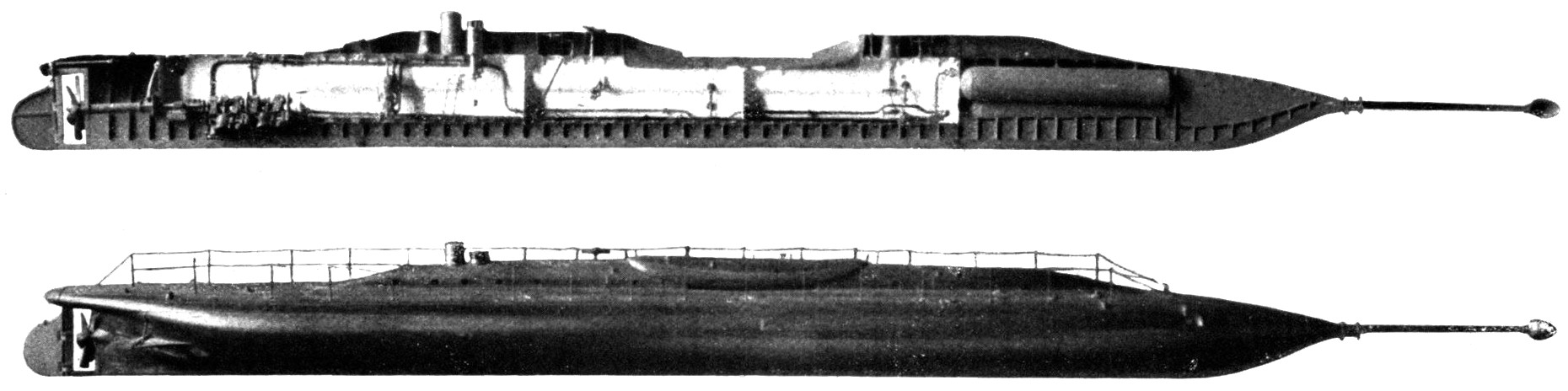
Plongeur (1876).

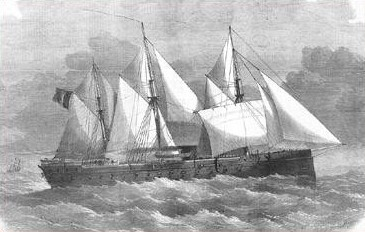
Gloire (1863).

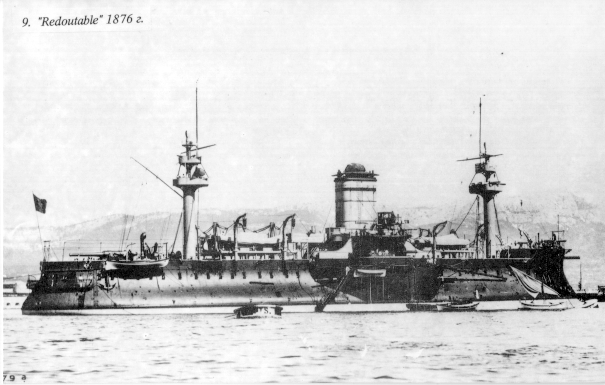
Redoutable (1876).

Jauréguiberry (1897).

=== Global interventions ===
In a speech in 1852, Napoleon III famously proclaimed that "The Empire means peace" ("L'Empire, c'est la paix"), although he was determined to follow a strong foreign policy to extend France's power and glory. The French Navy was involved in a multitude of actions around the world.

==== Crimean War ====
Napoleon III's challenge to Russia's claims to influence in the Ottoman Empire led to France's successful participation in the Crimean War (March 1854–March 1856). During this war Napoleon successfully established a French alliance with Britain, which continued after the war's close.

The French line-of-battle ship Henri IV and the corvette Pluton ran aground after a storm that destroyed many Allied ships. The remains of Henri IV were used to construct a fortress. The Pluton was a total loss.

==== East Asia ====
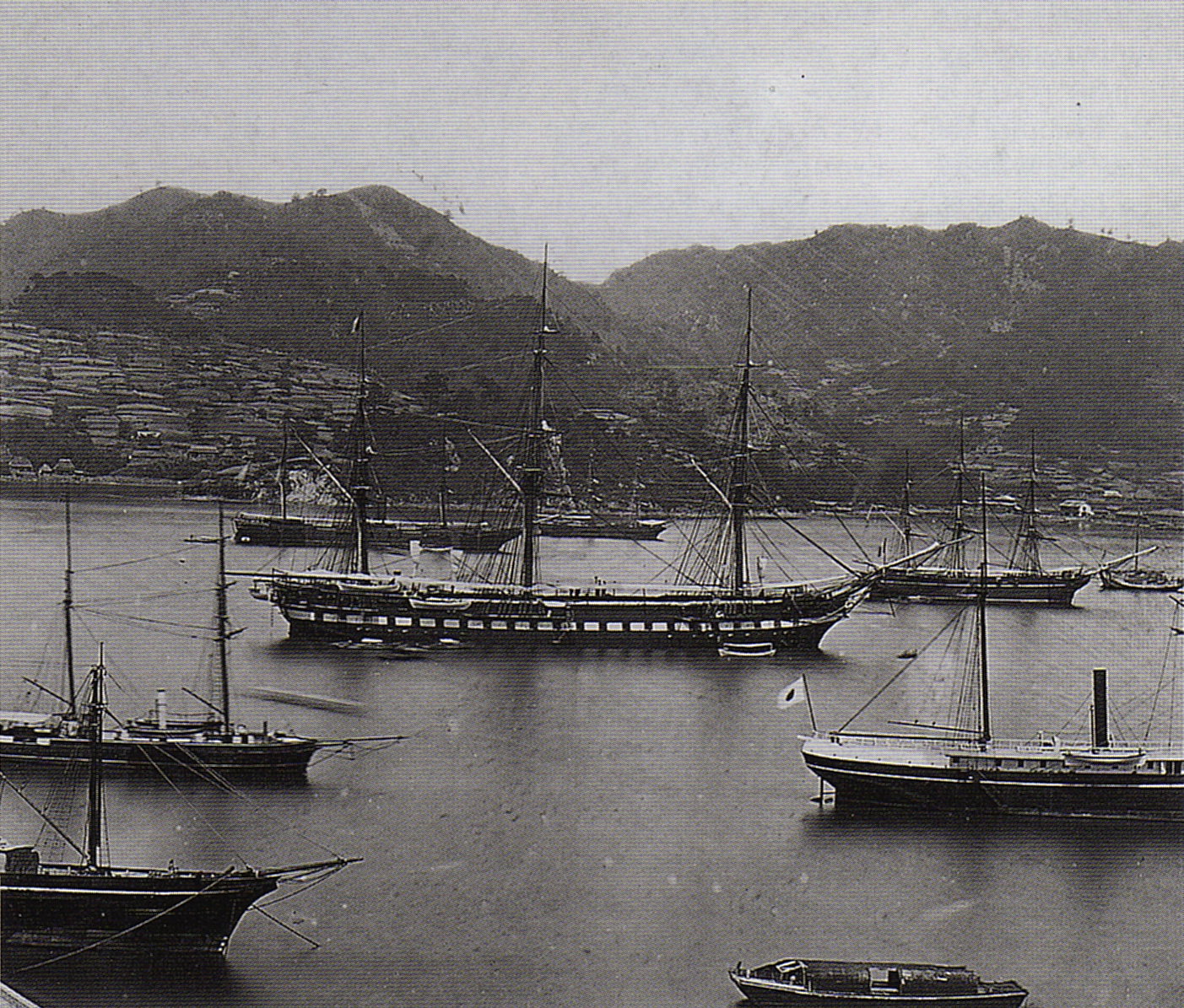
The French frigate Guerrière commanded by Admiral Pierre-Gustave Roze was the lead ship in the French campaign against Korea, 1866. Here the ship is photographed in Nagasaki harbour, circa 1865.

Napoleon III took the first steps to establishing a French colonial influence in Indochina. He approved the launching of a naval expedition in 1858 to punish the Vietnamese for their mistreatment of French Catholic missionaries and force the court to accept a French presence in the country. An important factor in his decision was the belief that France risked becoming a second-rate power by not expanding its influence in East Asia. Also, the idea that France had a civilizing mission was spreading. This eventually led to a full-out invasion in 1861. By 1862 the war was over and Vietnam conceded three provinces in the south, called by the French Cochinchina, opened three ports to French trade, allowed free passage of French warships to Cambodia (which led to a French protectorate over Cambodia in 1867), allowed freedom of action for French missionaries and gave France a large indemnity for the cost of the war.

In China, France took part in the Second Opium War, and in 1860 French troops entered Beijing. China was forced to concede more trading rights, allow freedom of navigation of the Yangtze river, give full civil rights and freedom of religion to Christians, and give France a huge indemnity. This, combined with the intervention in Vietnam, set the stage for further French influence in China, leading up to a sphere of influence over parts of Southern China. In 1866, the French Navy carried out an unsuccessful punitive mission against Korea. The French Navy also had a small presence in Japan in 1867–1868, around the actions of a French military mission to Japan, and the subsequent Boshin War.

==== Mexico ====
The French Navy was heavily involved in French intervention in Mexico (January 1862–March 1867). Napoleon III, using as a pretext the Mexican Republic's refusal to pay its foreign debts, planned to establish a French sphere of influence in North America by creating a French-backed monarchy in Mexico, a project which was supported by Mexican conservatives tired of the anti-clerical Mexican republic.

==== Pre-dreadnought battleships ====
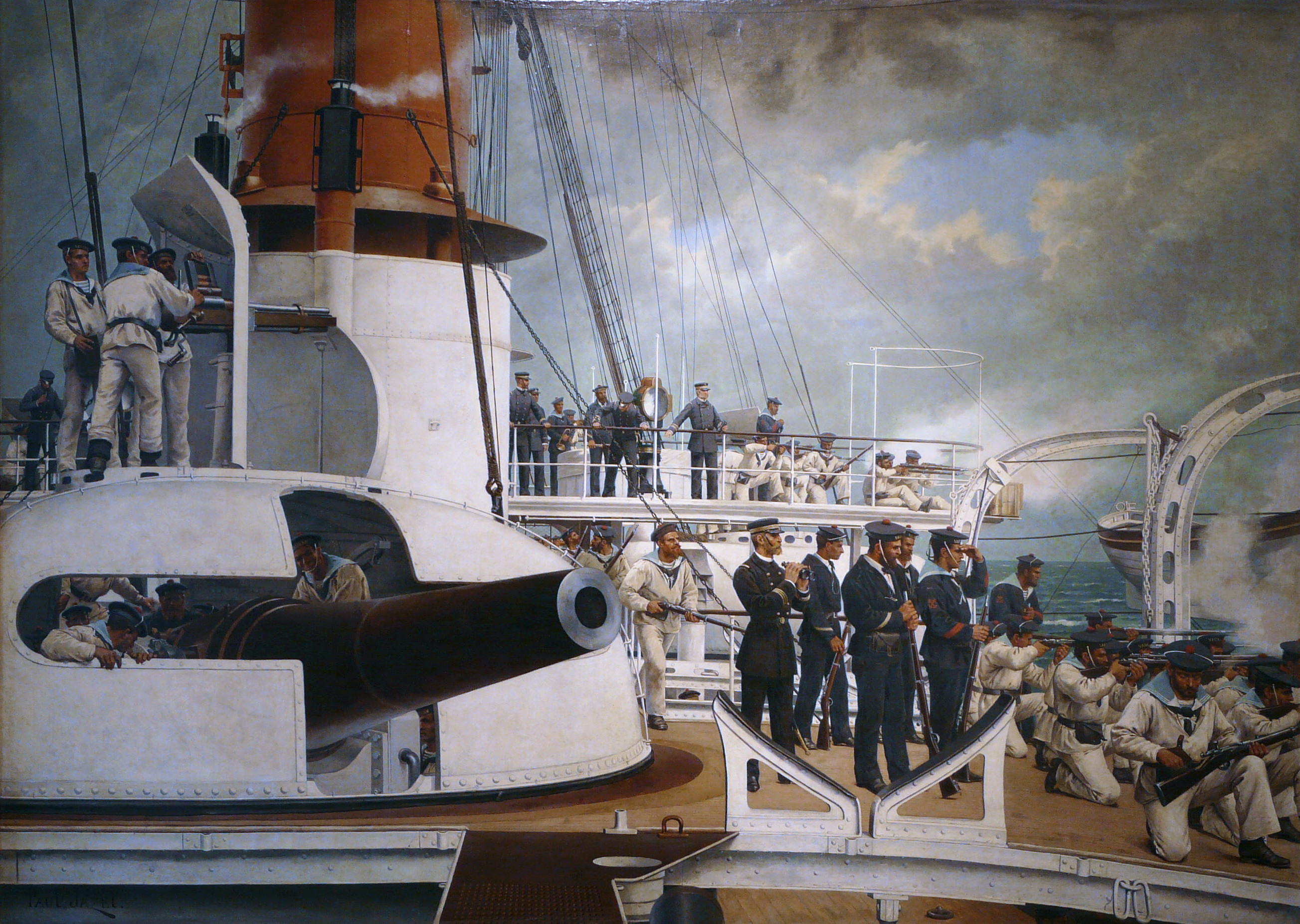
The ironclad Vauban (1882–1905), painting by Paul Jazet (1848–1918).

In the 1880s, the Jeune École doctrine had a more powerful influence within the French Navy than elsewhere. Derived from the traditions of privateer warfare, the Jeune École emphasised small, maneuverable craft such as torpedo boats and cruisers carrying shell-firing guns, and prematurely deemed the battleship obsolete. However, in the early 1890s the pre-dreadnought battleship revived with surprising vigour and new protections against torpedoes and mines, and the torpedo boats proved to have inadequate nautical qualities for the open ocean.

French capital ships of this time can be identified by their small size (10,000 tons), huge spur rams, tall height and pronounced tumble-home. Often carrying half the main armament of their British contemporaries, French battleships had armoured masts with electric elevators inside, outsized funnels, and davit systems to swing out boats from the narrow upper decks.

France built a considerable fleet of these vessels, though seldom with such uniform class characteristics as seen in Britain and Germany. The Bouvet, Masséna, and Jauréguiberry were built as "sample battleships", as the design for a true class of battleships was fiddled with. It eventually materialised with the 3-ship Charlemagne class, which introduced armament nearly on a par with its British contemporaries.

France's conceptual and technological edge proved attractive to the newly industrialising Japan, when the French engineer Émile Bertin was invited for four years to design a new fleet for the Imperial Japanese Navy, which led to her success in the First Sino-Japanese War in 1894. French yards busily turned out warships for foreign customers, especially Imperial Russia, which copied French styles in designing many of its cruisers and battleships. Despite her leads in some areas of technology (boilers, metallurgy), France did not have the productive capacity of her rival across the Channel, or her new nemesis, Germany.

Right at the turn of the century, French design absorbed influences from foreign practice. Her newer battleships had two twin-300mm gun turrets instead of single mounts, less exaggerated tumble-home of the hull, and abandonment of the ram bow. This led to improved seakeeping characteristics, though the ships remained small.

In the Liberté class (completed 1907), French pre-dreadnought design finally caught up with U.S. and British standards; but 1907 also saw the debut of HMS Dreadnought, which made all the world's capital ships obsolete overnight. Through 1911, while rival navies were turning out new dreadnoughts, all France's available shipyards were dedicated to producing the six-ship Danton class pre-dreadnoughts which, though they featured turbine/quad screw propulsion, still mounted only four heavy guns each, as against at least ten for a dreadnought.

The first French dreadnoughts did not appear until 1914, and two classes totalling seven ships, the Courbet and Bretagne classes, were completed during World War I. With the alliance with Britain, France's naval assets were concentrated in the Mediterranean, largely to face off the Austro-Hungarian fleet in the Adriatic Sea. Meanwhile, a large cruiser fleet was also built, seeing service in the Mediterranean, the Channel, and in France's imperial dominions in Indochina, Pacific Islands, West Africa, and the Caribbean.

===== French naval uniforms, 1884 =====
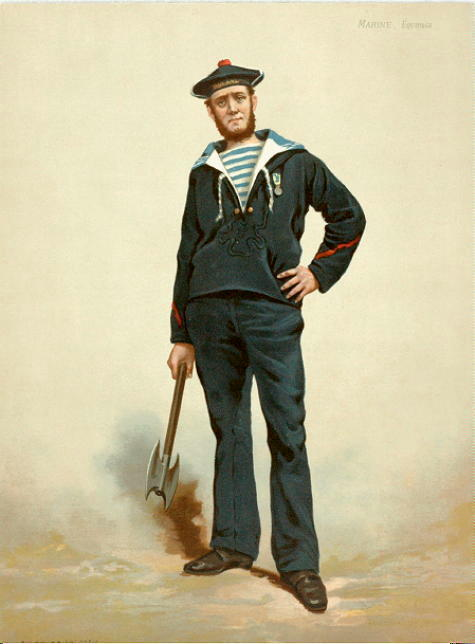
French sailor

'Going into battle'

== World Wars ==
The development of the French Navy slowed down in the beginning of the 20th century, and as a result, it was outnumbered by the German and US Navies. It was late to introduce new dreadnought battleships and light cruisers, and it entered the First World War with relatively few modern vessels: only one dreadnought in commission at war's start, with all four Courbets by the end of 1914 and three improved dreadnoughts by mid-1916. During the war, the main French effort was on land. While capital ships already on the ways were completed, few new warships were laid down. Despite its dated roster, the Marine Nationale performed well in World War I. The main operation of the French Navy was the Dardanelles Campaign. France's most significant losses during the war were four pre-dreadnought battleships, victims of mines and U-boat torpedoes.

A number of major ships of the French Navy at the outbreak / end of World War I:

- dreadnought battleships: 4/7
- pre-dreadnought battleships: 17/13
- armoured cruisers: 22/18
- protected cruisers: 13/12
- destroyers: 35/42 (capacity over 500 tons)
- torpedo boats: 180/164
- submarines: 50/61

=== The first proto-aircraft carrier ===
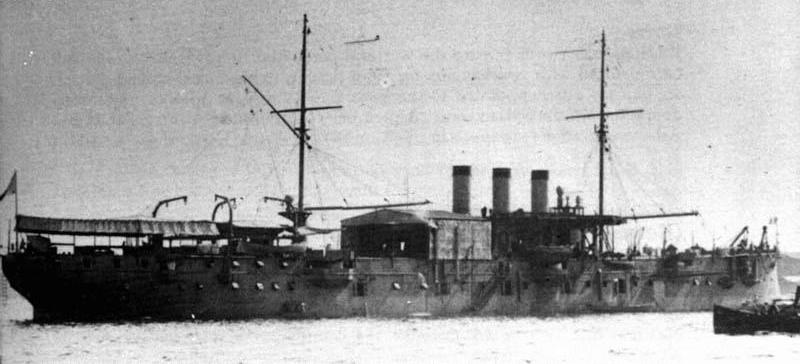
French seaplane carrier Foudre.

The invention of the seaplane in 1910 with the French Fabre Hydravion led to the earliest development of ships designed to carry aircraft, float planes. In 1911 the French Navy Foudre became the first seaplane carrier. She was commissioned as a seaplane tender, and carried float-planes in hangars on the main deck, from where they were lowered onto the sea with a crane. Foudre was further modified in November 1913 with a 10-metre flat deck to launch her seaplanes.

=== Genesis of the flat-deck carrier ===
"An airplane-carrying vessel is indispensable. These vessels will be constructed on a plan very different from what is currently used. First of all the deck will be cleared of all obstacles. It will be flat, as wide as possible without jeopardizing the nautical lines of the hull, and it will look like a landing field."
Clément Ader, L'Aviation Militaire, 1909

As heavier-than-air aircraft developed in the early 20th century, various navies began to take an interest in their potential use as scouts for their big gun warships. In 1909 the French inventor Clément Ader published in his book L'Aviation Militaire the description of a ship to operate airplanes at sea, with a flat flight deck, an island superstructure, deck elevators and a hangar bay. That year the US Naval Attaché in Paris sent a report on his observations and the first experiments to test the concept were made in the United States from 1910.

=== Fleet construction between the World Wars ===
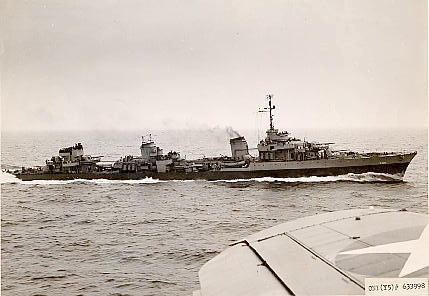
France's Le Fantasque class, the fastest destroyer class ever built.

Every naval fleet consists of a variety of ships of different sizes, and no fleet has enough resources to make every vessel supreme in its class. Nonetheless, different countries strive to excel in particular classes. Between the world wars, the French fleet was remarkable in its building of small numbers of ships that were "over the top" with relation to their equivalents of other powers.

For example, the French chose to build "super-destroyers" which were deemed during World War II by the Allies as the equivalent of light cruisers. This was a way of bypassing the Treaty of Washington, which imposed restrictions on cruisers and battleships, but not on destroyers and smaller units. The Le Fantasque class of destroyer is still the world's fastest class of destroyer. The Surcouf submarine was the largest and most powerful of its day.

In 1933, the French Navy was considering building a super-battleship, the Lyon class, but the plans were canceled when the Germans produced the so-called "pocket battleships"; the French responded with a class of two ships of the Dunkerque type, a fast battleship class falling somewhere in between battlecruisers and battleships. The large battleship niche was filled with the Richelieu class.

=== Second World War ===
At the outset of the war, the French Navy participated in a number of operations against the Axis powers, patrolling the Atlantic and bombarding Genoa. The French surrender and its armistice terms, however, completely changed the situation: the French fleet immediately withdrew from the fight.

==== Destruction of the French fleet and Vichy France ====
The British perceived the French fleet as a potentially lethal threat, should the French become formal enemies or, more likely, should Nazi Germany's Kriegsmarine gain control. It was essential that they should be put out of action. Some vessels were in British-controlled ports in Britain or Egypt and these were either persuaded to re-join the Allies as Free French ships or were boarded and disarmed.

Important parts of the fleet, however, were in Dakar and Mers-el-Kebir. The Royal Navy delivered an ultimatum but, when agreement proved impossible, they opened fire and sank or damaged much of the French fleet (Operation Catapult) on 3 July 1940, to stop the fleet from falling into Axis hands. The action soured Anglo-French relations and inhibited further defections to the Allies. From this point on, the ships remaining in Vichy French hands spent the war trying to observe neutrality towards the Axis powers, while avoiding capture by the Allies and the Free French. They obtained anecdotal tactical successes which weighted for nought against the overall strategic disaster, like the battles of Dakar and Ko Chang.

In November, 1942, the Allies invaded French North Africa. In response, the Germans occupied (Case Anton) Vichy France, including the French naval port of Toulon, where the main part of the surviving French fleet lay. This was a major German objective and forces under SS command had been detailed to capture them (Operation Lila). French naval authorities were divided on their response: Admiral Jean de Laborde, the commander of the Forces de Haute Mer (the High Seas Fleet) advocated sailing to attack the Allied invasion fleet while others, such as the Vichy Secretary of the Navy, Contre-Amiral Gabriel Auphan favoured joining the Allies. On several warships, there were spontaneous demonstrations in favour of sailing with the Allies, chanting "Vive de Gaulle! Appareillage!".

The orders to French commanders to scuttle their ships in case of an attempted take-over had been reinforced, however, and, often despite the presence of German troops, this was done in the scuttling of the French fleet at Toulon. No capital ships and few others were taken in reparable condition. A few ships fled Toulon and joined the Allies, notably the submarine Casabianca.

==== Free French Naval Forces ====
FNFL ensign

In the wake of the Armistice and the Appeal of 18 June, Charles de Gaulle founded the Free French Forces, including a naval arm, the Free Naval French Forces (Forces navales françaises libres, FNFL). To distinguish the FNFL from the Vichy French forces, Vice-Admiral Émile Muselier created the bow flag displaying the French colours with a red cross of Lorraine, and a cocarde also featuring the cross of Lorraine for aircraft.

The French fleet was widely dispersed. Some vessels were in port in France; others had escaped from France to British-controlled ports, mainly in Britain itself or Alexandria in Egypt. At the first stage of Operation Catapult, the ships in the British ports of Plymouth and Portsmouth were simply boarded on the night of 3 July 1940. The then-largest submarine in the world, the Surcouf, which had sought refuge in Portsmouth in June 1940 following the German invasion of France, made an effort to resist the boarding. In capturing the submarine, two British officers and one French sailor were killed. Other ships were the two obsolete battleships Paris and Courbet, the destroyers Le Triomphant and the Léopard, 8 torpedo boats, 5 submarines and a number of other ships of lesser importance.

Most of these ships were surrendered to the FNFL (notably the submarine Surcouf), and other were leased by the British (like the corvette Aconit), constituting the embryo of a naval force.

When French Africa joined the Allies, important ships based in Dakar were obtained (notably the cruisers Suffren, Gloire, Montcalm, Georges Leygues, and the battleship Richelieu).

Beside warships, the FNFL developed special forces: Captain Philippe Kieffer took inspiration from the British commandos to train new units of "Commandos Fusiliers-Marins", which later would become the Commandos Marine. These commandos distinguished themselves during the Battle of Normandy, climbing cliffs under fire to destroy German shore batteries. Captain Henri Honoré d'Estienne d'Orves attempted to unite the French Resistance, and became an inspiring symbol when he was arrested, tortured by the Gestapo and executed.

The FNFL also harboured technical innovators, like Captain Jacques Cousteau, who invented the modern aqua-lung, and Yves Rocard, who improved radar. The aqua-lung became a major improvement for commando operations.

French warships of the FNFL supported the landings in southern France (Operation Dragoon) and Normandy (Operation Neptune). These units also played their parts in the war in the Pacific. Richelieu was present in Tokyo Bay during the signing of the Japanese Instrument of Surrender.

== Modern navy ==
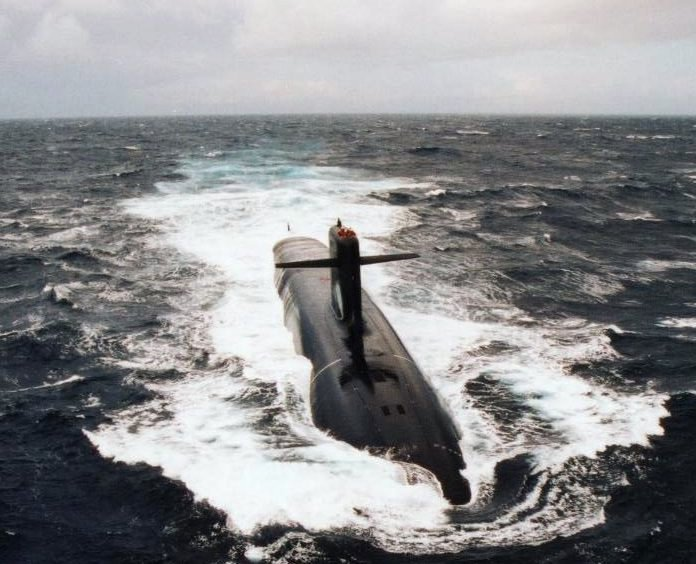
The SNLE-NG Le Téméraire

French naval doctrine calls for two aircraft carriers, but the French only have one, the Charles de Gaulle.

The navy is in the midst of major technological and procurement changes. A naval version of the Rafale is replacing older aircraft. Newer strategic submarines of the SNLE-NG type have mostly replaced the elder SNLE, and a new nuclear ballistic missile is under test, due for 2008. The experience acquired with the building of the SNLE-NG will also lead to a newer type of nuclear attack submarines, which are expected for 2017. Surface forces are upgrading in numbers and modernity, with two large destroyers and 11 frigates planned. More modern missiles are being issued, notably adding cruise missile capabilities.

== See also ==
- Military history of France

=== People ===
- Raoul Castex, the admiral was a major theorist in 20th century

==== Politicians ====
- Richelieu
- Colbert
- Étienne François de Choiseul, Duke of Choiseul
- Georges Leygues

==== Heroes of the Ancien Régime ====
- Jean de Vienne
- Forbin, famous privateer
- Duquesne
- Tourville
- Jean Bart, famous privateer
- Duguay-Trouin, famous privateer
- Admiral de Grasse, commander of the French fleet which help the USA secure independence

==== Heroes of the First Republic ====
- Casabianca
- Dupetit-Thouars
- du Chayla
- Surcouf
- Latouche-Tréville
- Admiral Villaret-Joyeuse

==== Explorers ====
- Jacques Cartier
- Champlain
- Bougainville
- Lapérouse
- d'Entrecasteaux
- Nicolas Thomas Baudin
- Dumont d'Urville
- Savorgnan de Brazza
- Captain Cousteau

==== Other important French naval officers ====
- Admiral Courbet
- Pierre-Charles Villeneuve, commander of the French and Spanish fleets at the Battle of Trafalgar
- Pierre Loti, mostly known for his literary works

=== Lists of ships ===
- List of ships of the line of France
- List of French sail frigates
- List of battleships of France
- Current French Navy ships
- List of French Navy ship names
- Three ships were named for the Grand Admiral of France: see French ship Maillé Brézé

=== List of naval battles ===
- List of French naval battles
