= Battle of Orbetello =

Part of the Thirty Years' War and the Franco-Spanish War (1635)

Coordinates: 42°26′00″N 11°13′00″E

- Part of the Thirty Years' War and the Franco-Spanish War (1635–1659)
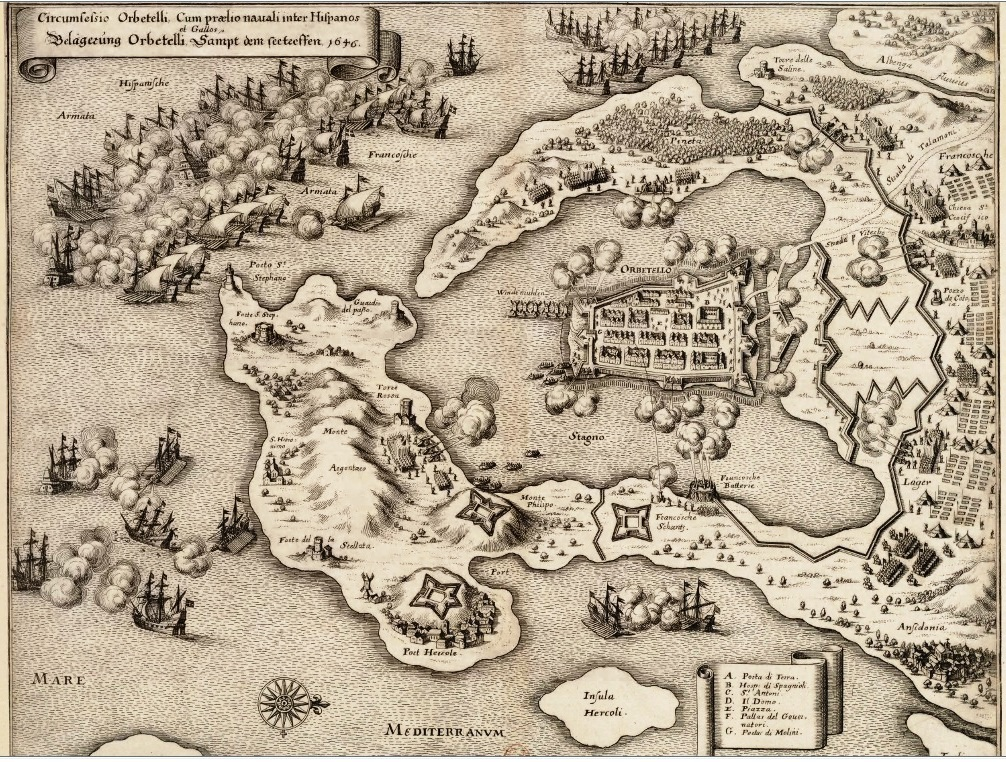
- The blockade of Orbetello, engraving by Matthäus Merian
Date	14–16 June 1646
Location	Off Orbetello (present-day Tuscany, central Italy)
Result	Spanish victory

Belligerents
France	Spain

Commanders and leaders
(Kingdom of France) Marquis of Brézé †	(Spain) Count of Linhares

Strength
24 sailing ships 20 galleys 8 fireships 4 fluyts	22 sailing ships 30 galleys 5 fireships

Casualties and losses
1 fireship exploded	1 frigate scuttled

The Battle of Orbetello, also known as the Battle of Isola del Giglio, was a major naval engagement of the Franco-Spanish War of 1635. It was fought on 14 June 1646 off the Spanish-ruled town of Orbetello, on the coast of Tuscany, Italy, between a French fleet led by Admiral Armand de Maillé, Marquis of Brézé, and a Spanish fleet commanded by Miguel de Noronha, 4th Count of Linhares sent to break the blockade of Orbetello and relieve the town, besieged since 12 May by a French army commanded by Prince Thomas of Savoy. The Battle of Orbetello was tactically very unusual, since it was fought by sailing ships towed by galleys in a light breeze.

After a hard but inconclusive fight during which Admiral Brézé was killed, the French fleet withdrew to Toulon leaving the sea to the Spanish, who decided not to pursue them to relieve Orbetello. The land forces disembarked by Count of Linhares a few days later, however, failed to dislodge the French lines, and the siege would be undertaken until 24 July, when another Spanish army led by the Carlo Andrea Caracciolo, marquis of Torrecuso and the Duke of Arcos, which had come from the Kingdom of Naples across the Papal States, defeated the besieging French troops, forcing them to retreat with heavy losses.

== Background ==
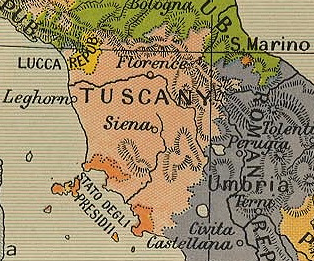
Map of Grand Duchy of Tuscany and State of Presidi from Adolphus William Ward's Cambridge Modern History Atlas, 1912

In 1646, after several naval successes against Spain along the Mediterranean, Cardinal Mazarin planned a naval expedition to conquer the Spanish-held State of Presidi with the aim of interrupting Spanish communications with the Kingdom of Naples, threatening the initial stage of the Spanish military corridor, the so-called Spanish Road, and also to frighten Pope Innocent X, whose Spanish sympathies displeased him. For this purpose, a fleet commanded by young Admiral Marquis of Brézé was assembled at Toulon. Made of 36 galleons, 20 galleys, and a large complement of minor vessels, it had on board an army of some 8,000 infantry and 800 cavalry with baggage under the command of Thomas Francis of Savoy, who had previously been in the employ of the Spanish Crown.

Orbetello was erected in a spit between two inner bays of a big lagoon. Various fortified positions made it a strong defensive position: Porto Ercole at the east, San Stefano at the west, and the fort San Filippo on the Monte Argentario island, linked to the mainland by a narrow isthmus. In the end, the French army landed at Talamone, where Brézé left to the Prince a half-dozen vessels and galleys to bombard the forts of the town. Meanwhile, he went to Porto San Stefano with five sailing ships and four galleys and bombarded the fort until it surrendered. After the loss of those positions, Don Carlo de la Gatta, the castellan of Orbetello, retreated to the hermitage of Cristo. The isthmus was occupied thanks to a battery mounted aboard the French galleys, and soon the lagoon was filled with armed boats gathered by Jean-Paul de Saumeur, Chevalier Paul. Don Carlo de la Gatta, supported by just 200 Spanish and Italian soldiers, had very few opportunities to resist without help. An early relief force of 35 boats and five escort galleys sent from Naples with munitions and supplies was beaten, so a major fleet action was expected.

When news of the siege reached Spain, Philip IV gave orders to assemble a relief fleet. Second-hand goods were purchased in the Netherlands and extraordinary levies were carried out across the country. The command of the expedition was entrusted to the Portuguese loyalist Miguel de Noronha, Count of Linhares, who was Captain General of the Galleys of the Mediterranean, and therefore supreme commander of the Spanish naval forces of this sea. He received orders to sail to Orbetello in command of 22 men-of-war of the Silver fleet and the Dunkirk squadron; the latter providing eight frigates. At least 3,300 soldiers were brought aboard these ships for the relief. Linhares' second in command was Admiral General Francisco Díaz de Pimienta, who displeased by his always secondary role, had recently resigned, claiming ill health. While Pimienta would be in charge of the sailing ships, Linhares would do so with the galleys. Once at sea, the Spanish fleet was joined off the Sardinian Cape Carbonara by 18 galleys from the squadrons of Naples, Sardinia, Genoa and Sicily, which drove up its strength to 22 galleons and frigates and 30 galleys. Grand Admiral Jean Armand de Maillé-Brézé, Admiral de Maille Brézé, meanwhile, could be reinforced by the divisions of Montade and Saint-Tropez, and was able to oppose Linhares and Pimienta with 24 sailing ships and 20 galleys.

== Battle ==
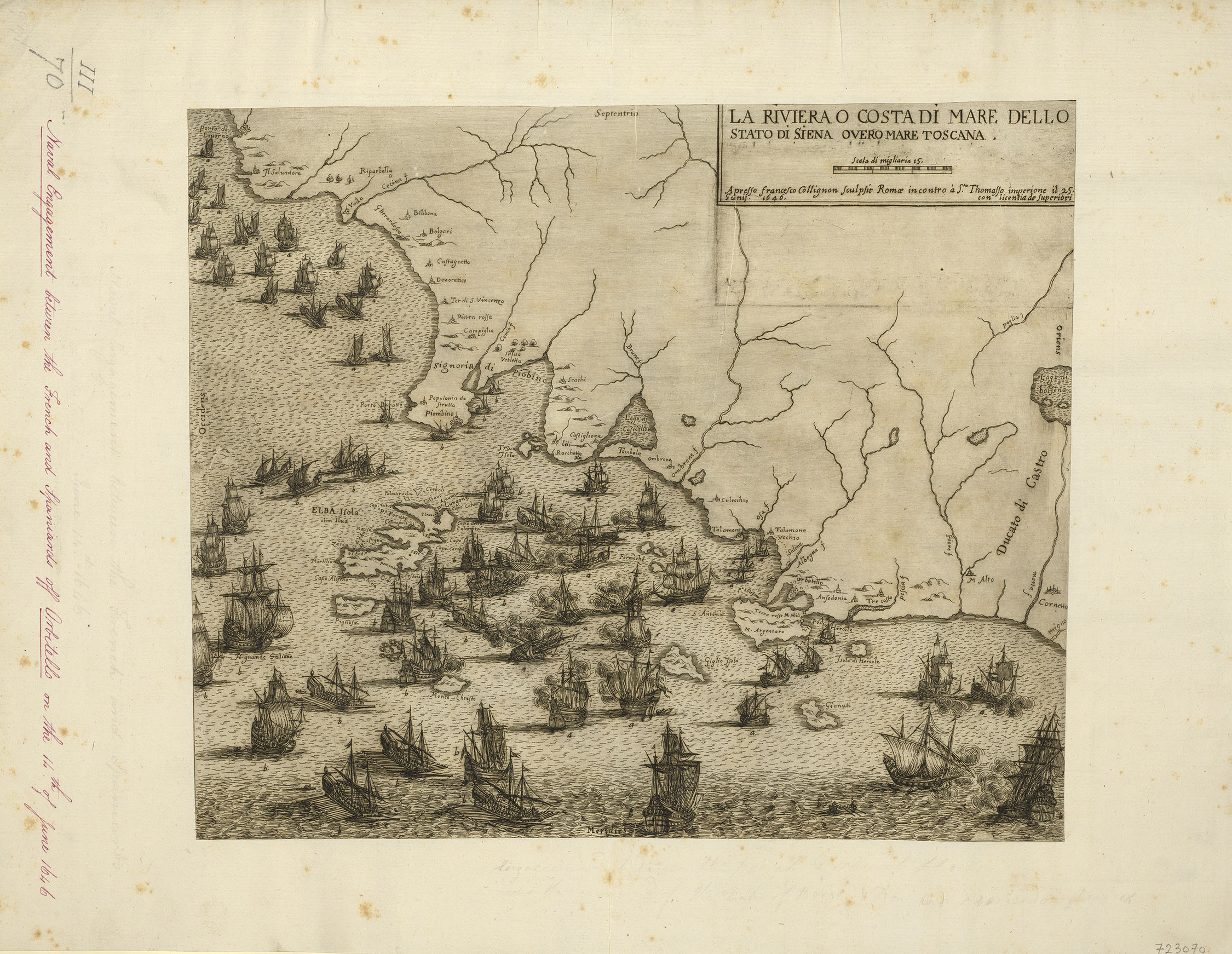
The Battle of Orbetello, by François Collignon

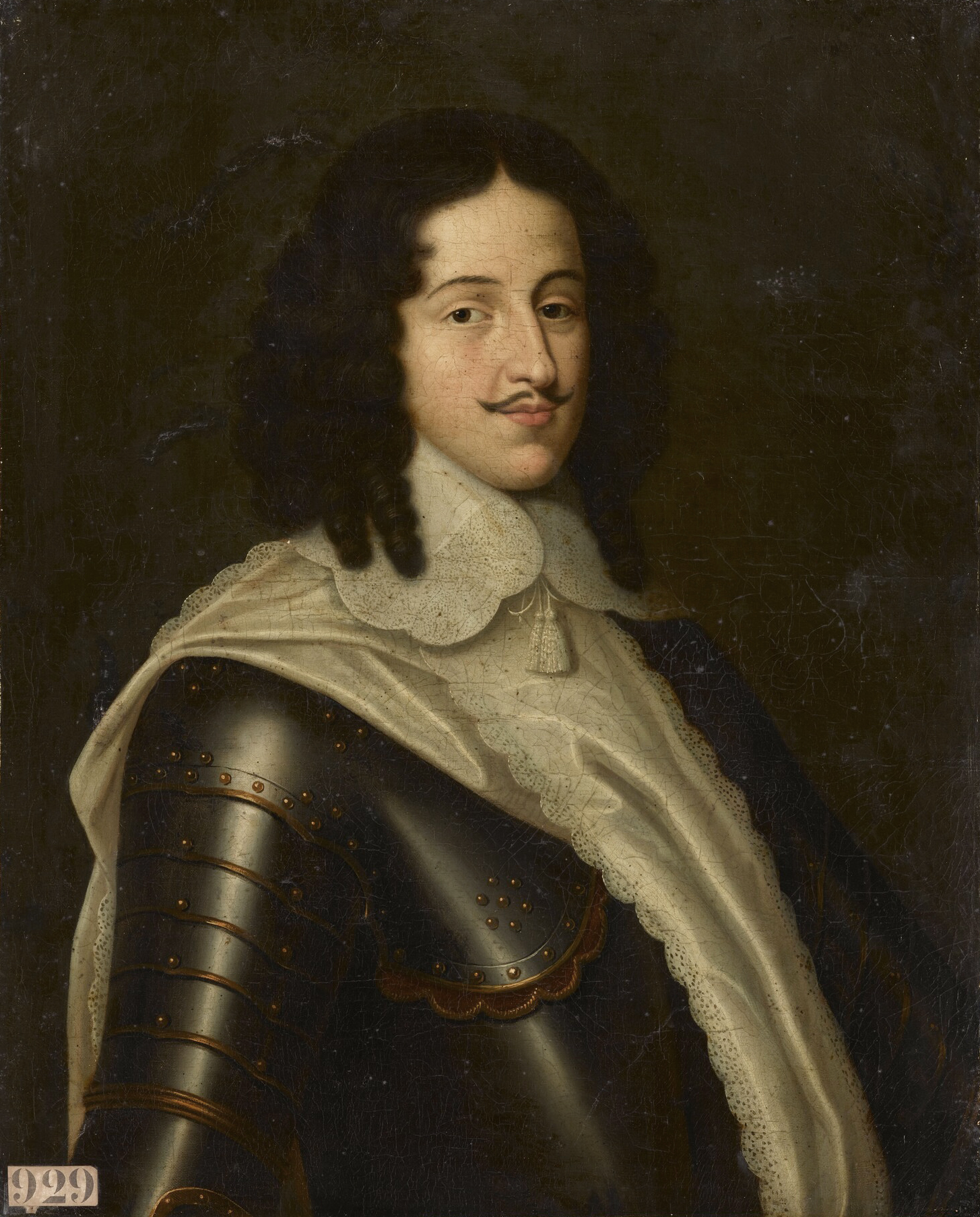
Jean Armand de Maillé-Brézé (Palace of Versailles)

At dawn on 14 June the Spanish fleet bore down off the Giglio Island in a line astern with the galleons and the galleys at the forefront and eight lagging vessels closing the formation. Admiral Brézé formed his fleet in a line shortly after, alternating galleons and galleys, and sailed westward in a gentle breeze, closed with Linhares' ships. At 9:00 PM Brézé had approached four miles to the Spanish, when, due to the lightness of the wind, the galleons of the two fleets had to be towed by the galleys while awaiting to be at windward. Brézé, aboard his flagship Grand Saint-Louis, stood in front of the line flanked by Vice-admiral Louis de Foucault de Saint-Germain Beaupré, comte du Daugnon's la Lune and Rear-admiral Jules de Montigny's le Soleil. His ship was in tow of Lieutenant-General Vinguerre's Patrone galley. Fifteen other vessels composed the French line of battle, each one towed by a galley. Montade's six-ship division was left in reserve.

Both fleets sailed along each other until Linhares, thanks to the superior number of galleys that he had, gained the windward and was able to move towards the French line, attempting to overrun its line to catch it between two fires. Linhares had in tow Pimienta's flag galleon Santiago; don Álvaro de Bazán del Viso, general of the Neapolitan galleys, the galleon Trinidad, flagship of Admiral Pablo de Contreras; and Enrique de Benavides, general of the Sicilian galleys, other large Spanish galleons.

Brézé, unable to dispatch his fireships over the Spanish vessels, as he had done in his previous battles at Cádiz, Barcelona, and Cartagena, lunged over Pimienta's galleon Santiago and riddled the ship with his artillery Santiago lost its main-mast and had to be succored by Linhares and Pablo de Contreras. Fearing the attack of the French fireships or the boarding of Brézé's galleys, Contreras covered the damaged galleon at the head of six vessels, while Linhares' flag galley towed it out of danger. The remaining ships engaged Brézé in an inconclusive action which lasted until both fleets separated at dusk. The Spanish lost the frigate Santa Catalina, burnt by its own crew to avoid capture when she was surrounded by the French la Mazarine and three other vessels. The foremost Spanish galleons Testa de Oro, León Rojo, and Caballo marino received heavy damage, while a French fireship blew up. Two French galleons were also badly damaged. The Spanish casualties are unknown. Forty men were killed or wounded aboard the French fleet. One of them was Admiral Brézé, cut in half by a cannonball which hit the stern of his flagship, Grand Saint Louis.

The following morning the Spanish and French fleets were 12 miles apart. Comte du Daugnon, Brézé's successor, decided to set sail to Porto Ercole to make repairs instead of pursuing the Spanish fleet, which had sought refuge behind the Giglio island. Linhares chased him during all 15 June and part of the 16th. Four French storeships, unaware of the main fleet's departure, fell amidst the Spanish fleet the first night, but managed to escape by following Linhares maneuvers. The Spanish admiral finally abandoned the pursuit to relieve Orbetello. This proved to be impossible because a storm dispersed most of the ships during the night. Some of them took refuge in Sardinia; others at Giglio and Montecristo. The galley Santa Bárbara sank off Giglio, causing the death of 46 rowers. The French also suffered from the storm. One of their galleys, la Grimaldi, sank off Piombino, although its crew and artillery was taken aboard the Spanish fleet. Another ship, Saint-Dominique, lagged behind along with a fireship and was captured by Pimienta off Cape Corse.

== Aftermath ==
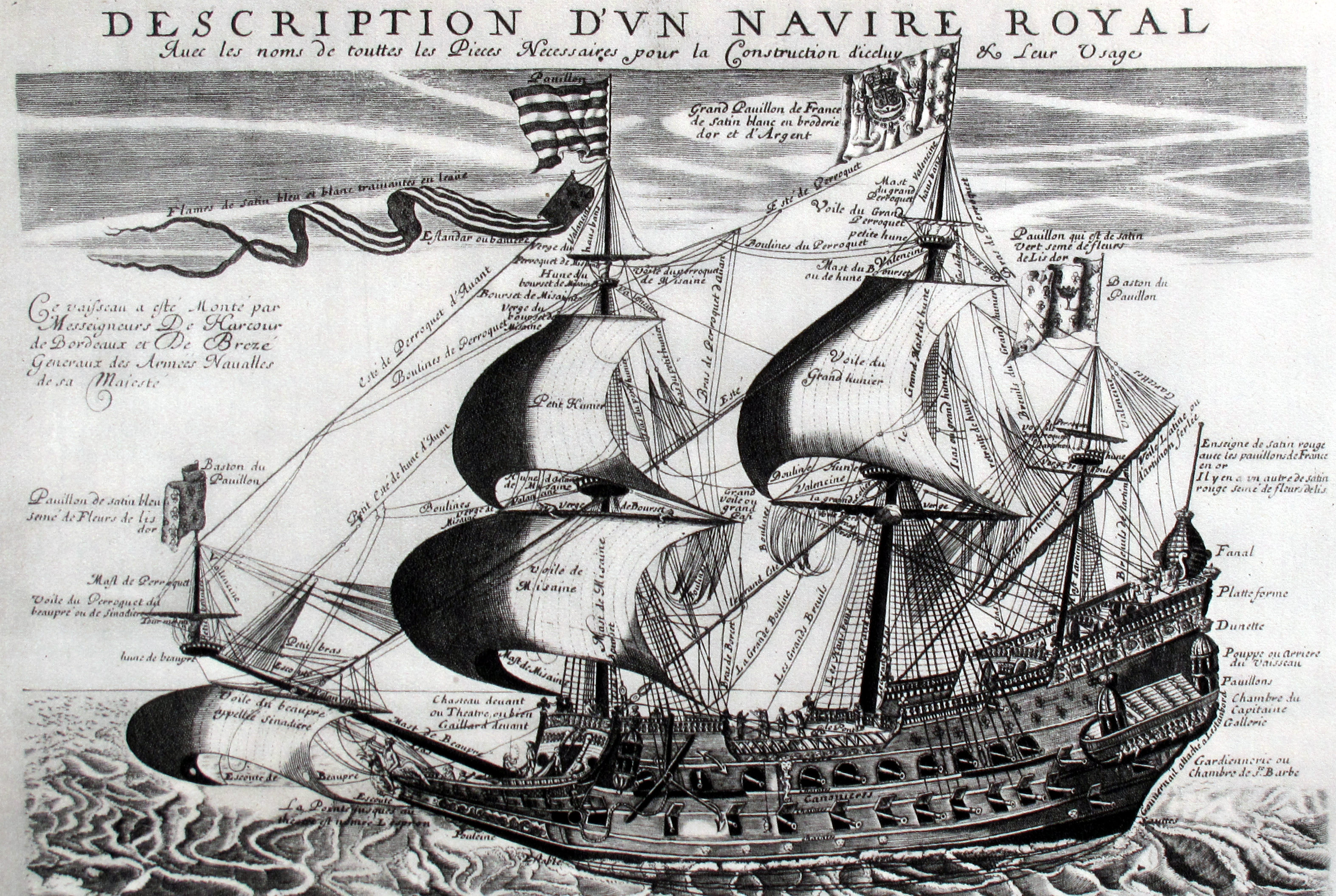
The vessel Grand Saint-Louis, aboard which Admiral Maillé-Brézé was killed during the battle

On 23 June the Spanish fleet anchored off Porto Longone, where it was decided during a war council to relieve Orbetello after the most essential repairs had been made. Two days later several Dunkirkers were dispatched to force the Talamone's port mouth, and eight ships arrived from Naples at Porto Santo Stefano, destroying or capturing about 70 tartanes and barges which contained the supplies of Thomas of Savoy's army during the operation.

Du Daugnon, meanwhile, returned to Toulon. Despite his failure, reinforcements could later be carried to Talamone aboard five ships, and Linhares' attempts to dislodge the French siege lines were unsuccessful. Linhares disembarked 3,300 soldiers led by Pimienta, who divided them in two corps and advanced upon the French lines. The first one managed to occupy a hill on which a French cavalry attack was repulsed, but the second corps was dislodged after a 6-hour battle and forced to re-embark. Four hundred wounded men were evacuated; the killed were left on the battlefield. The siege was not lifted until an army under the Duke of Arcos and the Marquis of Torrecuso stormed the besieger camp a month later, killing or capturing over 7,000 men and taking all the artillery and the baggage, which turned the whole French campaign into a failure.

Dissatisfied with the outcome of the naval battle, Philip IV, who expected that the French fleet would have been destroyed, and the honour of his navy restored, dismissed and imprisoned Count of Linhares and Admiral Pimienta, among other officers, accusing them of mismanagement and abandonment of their forces. Linhares was replaced by Luis Fernández de Córdoba, Pimienta by Jerónimo Gómez de Sandoval, and Bazán del Viso by Giannettino Doria. Philip IV also appointed his 17-year-old illegitimate son John Joseph of Austria as Príncipe de la mar, commander of all the Hispanic maritime forces, giving him widespread orders and powers in order to end the perceived misrule of the Spanish Navy. The French failure at Orbetello contributed greatly to the reduction of the French pressure in Italy. Six thousand soldiers from Naples could be consequently carried to Valencia to fight the French armies in Catalonia.

In September, a French expedition led by Charles de la Porte de la Meilleraye, with Portuguese help, succeeded in capturing the presidios of both Piombino and Porto Longone, which encouraged Francesco I d'Este, Duke of Modena, to change his allegiance from the Spanish monarchy to France. Four years later, with the start of The Fronde, John Joseph recovered Piombino on 19 June and Porto Longone on 31 July.
