= Miguel de Noronha, 4th Count of Linhares =

Portuguese colonial governor

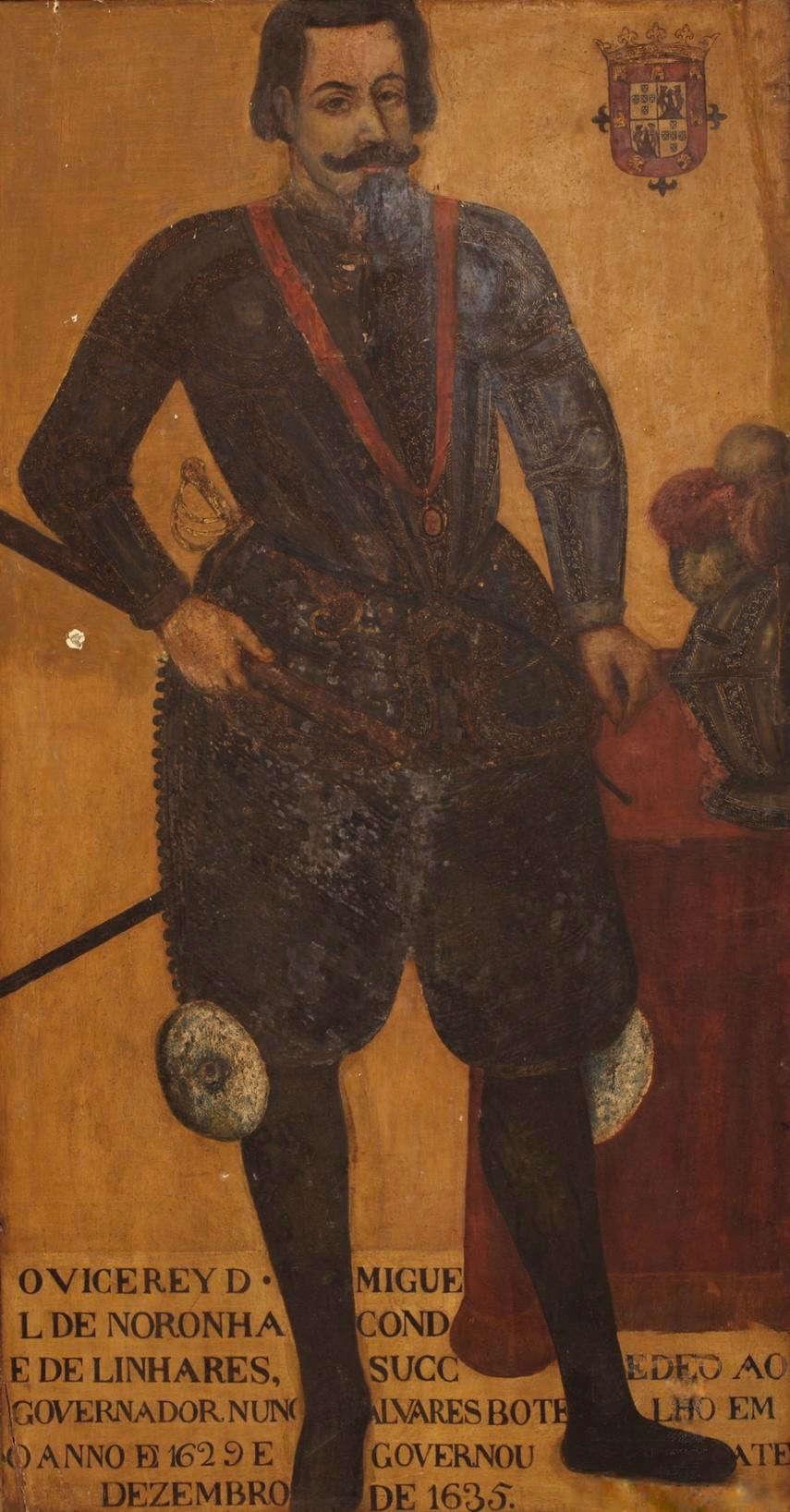

Governor of Portuguese India
- In office 1629–1635
- Succeeded by: Pero da Silva

Personal details
- Born: 1585 Portugal
- Died: 1647 (aged 61–62) Madrid, Spain
- Occupation: Colonial administrator

Military service
- Allegiance: Iberian Union
- Battles/wars: Battle of Orbetello

Miguel de Noronha, 4th Count of Linhares (1585-1647) was a Portuguese noble and military man in the service to King Philip III of Portugal and IV of Spain.

== Biography ==
He became 4th Count of Linhares when his cousin in the third degree, Dom Fernando de Noronha, died childless in 1608. Like his father, Afonso de Noronha, he was governor of Tangier between 1624 and 1628, gaining several successes in struggles with the Moors in that region. After that, he became the 44th Governor of Portuguese India and 23rd Viceroy of India, between 1629 and 1635. His grandfather Afonso de Noronha, had also been Viceroy of India between 1550 and 1554.

During his reign in India, Miguel was confronted by serious problems with corruption and external attacks, which led to important losses in Portuguese Ceylon and Mombasa. on his return in Europe, he became a member of the Council of Portugal in Madrid. Here he defended the position that Portugal should remain a Kingdom, in personal union with the Kingdom of Spain. This led to serious confrontations with Olivares, who felt that all dominions of King Philip IV of Spain should be Spanish provinces.

At the outbreak of the Portuguese Restoration War in 1640, he remained loyal to King Philip. As a reward for his loyalty, he was appointed General of the galleys of Sicily and Spain, and raised to Marquis de Gijón and Duke of Viseu.

As General of the Galleys, he fought in 1646 the Battle of Orbitello against France. After the battle, he was relieved from his command and imprisoned, for not having destroyed the French fleet. He died in Madrid in 1647. He was the Great-Great grandfather of José de Carvajal y Lancáster

== Sources ==
- Portuguese Wikipedia
- CHAM Centro de História de Alem-Mar
- Geneall.net
