= French ship Maillé Brézé =

Three ships of the French Navy have borne the name Brézé or Maillé Brézé in honour of admiral Jean Armand de Maillé-Brézé:

- French ship Brézé (1646) (1646–1665), a -gun ship of the line.
- French destroyer Maillé Brézé (1931) (named Brézé until January 1931), a Vauquelin-class destroyer destroyed in the accidental explosion of one of her torpedoes on 30 April 1940 in Greenock
- French destroyer Maillé-Brézé (D627), T 47-class destroyer, presently a museum ship
