= Jean Armand de Maillé, 2nd Marquis of Brézé =

French admiral (1619–1646)

Jean Armand de Maillé
- 2nd Marquis of Brézé
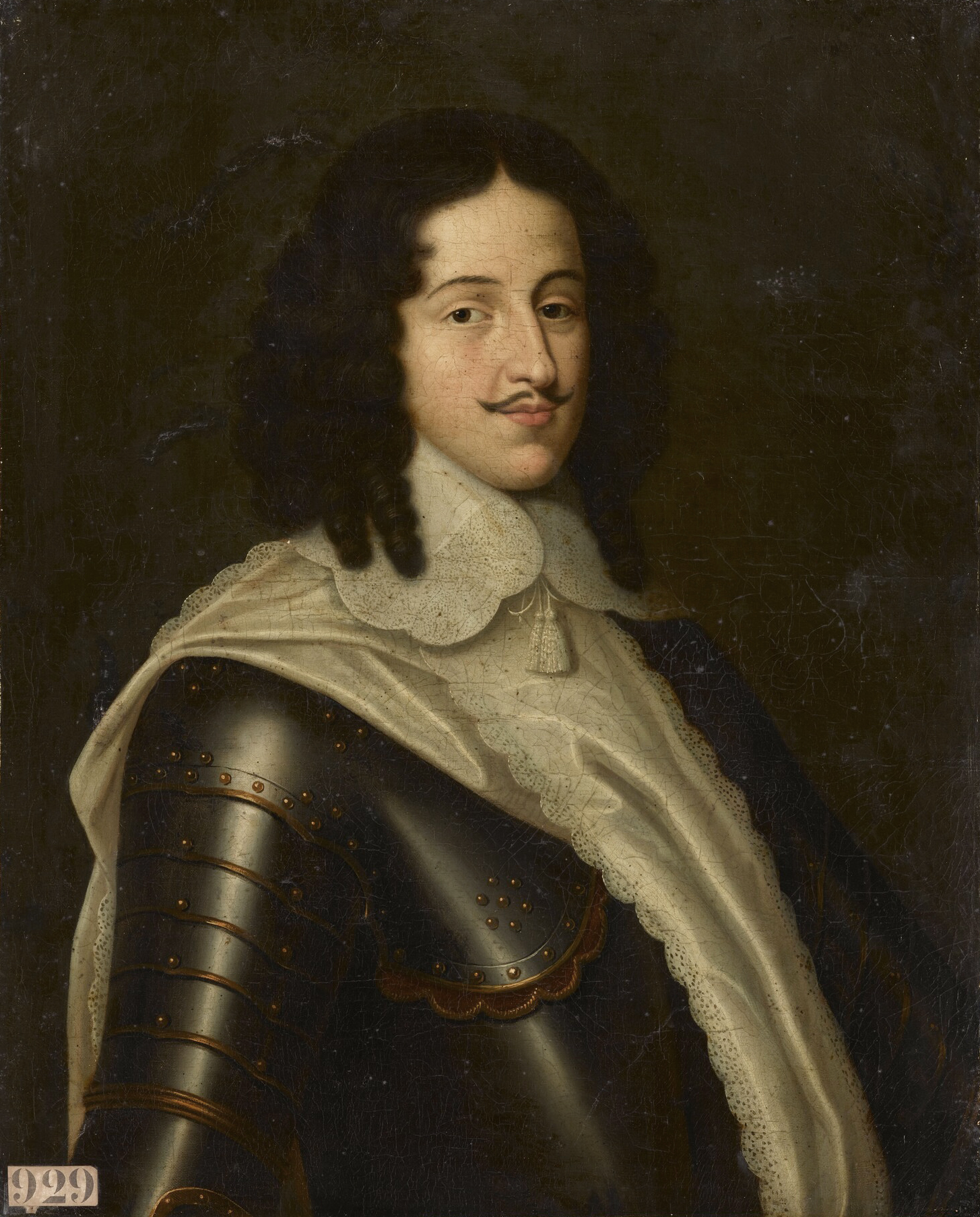
- the Marquis of Brézé (Versailles)

- Coat of arms
- Full name: Jean Armand de Maillé
- Born: 18 October 1619; Milly le Meugon, France
- Died: 16 June 1646 (aged 26); Battle of Orbetello
- Spouse: never married
- Issue: no issue
- Father: Urbain de Maillé, Marquis of Brézé
- Mother: Nicole du Plessis

Jean Armand de Maillé, 2nd Marquis of Brézé, Duke of Fronsac (18 October 1619 – 16 June 1646) was a French admiral.

== Early life ==
Jean was born in Milly-le-Meugon, in one of the most powerful French families of the time; his father was Urbain de Maillé, Marquis of Brézé, Marshal of France, and Nicole du Plessis. His uncle was Cardinal Richelieu, King Louis XIII's renowned minister, and his brother-in-law, Louis de Bourbon, Prince of Condé, (better known as the le Grand Condé), was the First Prince of the Blood.

== Career ==
Thanks to his uncle, at the age of seventeen, Jean received the title of grand-maître de la navigation (Grand-master of Navigation), a new title created by King Louis XIII for Cardinal Richelieu and equivalent to Grand Admiral of France.

One of the leading figures in the Eighty Years' War, Jean won a victory at the battle of Cádiz near Cádiz (20 July 1640), and then seized Villafranca. In 1641, he arrived in Portugal to help in the Portuguese Restoration War against Spain. In 1642, Jean fought at the Battle of Barcelona against the Spanish forces near Barcelona, and Battle of Cartagena on 3 July 1643. He was killed on 16 June 1646, during the Battle of Orbetello.

His remains were buried in the church of Milly le Meugon, abutted to the castle walls.

== Honours ==
Three ships were named in his honour: see French ship Maillé Brézé

- 46-gun ship of the line Brézé (1646-1665) [1]
- Maillé-Brézé (named Brézé until January 1931), a Vauquelin class destroyer destroyed in the accidental explosion of one of her torpedoes on 30 April 1940 in Greenock, Scotland
- Maillé-Brézé (D627), T 47 class destroyer, presently a museum

== Sources ==
- Bourque, Bernard J. (2015). All the Abbé's Women: Power and Misogyny in Seventeenth-Century France, through the Writing of Abbe d'Aubignac. GmbH Co.
- Lacour-Gayet, Georges (1911). La marine militaire de la France sous les règnes de Louis XIII et de Louis XIV. Honore Champion.
- Winfield, Rif; Roberts, Stephen S (2017). French Warships in the Age of Sail, 1626–1786: Design, Construction, Careers and Fates. Seaforth Publishing.
- Les bâtiments ayant porté le nom de Maillé-Brézé
- Louis Gabriel Michaud. "Maillé-Brézé". Biographie universelle ancienne et moderne : histoire par ordre alphabétique de la vie publique et privée de tous les hommes avec la collaboration de plus de 300 savants et littérateurs français ou étrangers (in French) (2 ed.)., vol. 26
- La Bruyère, René, La marine de Richelieu; Maillé-Brézé, général des galères, grand amiral (1619-1646), Plon, Paris, 1945, 245 pages.
