= Battle of Cartagena (1643) =

1643 naval battle off Cartagena, Spain

Coordinates: 37.6000°N 0.9833°W

- Part of the Franco-Spanish War (1635)
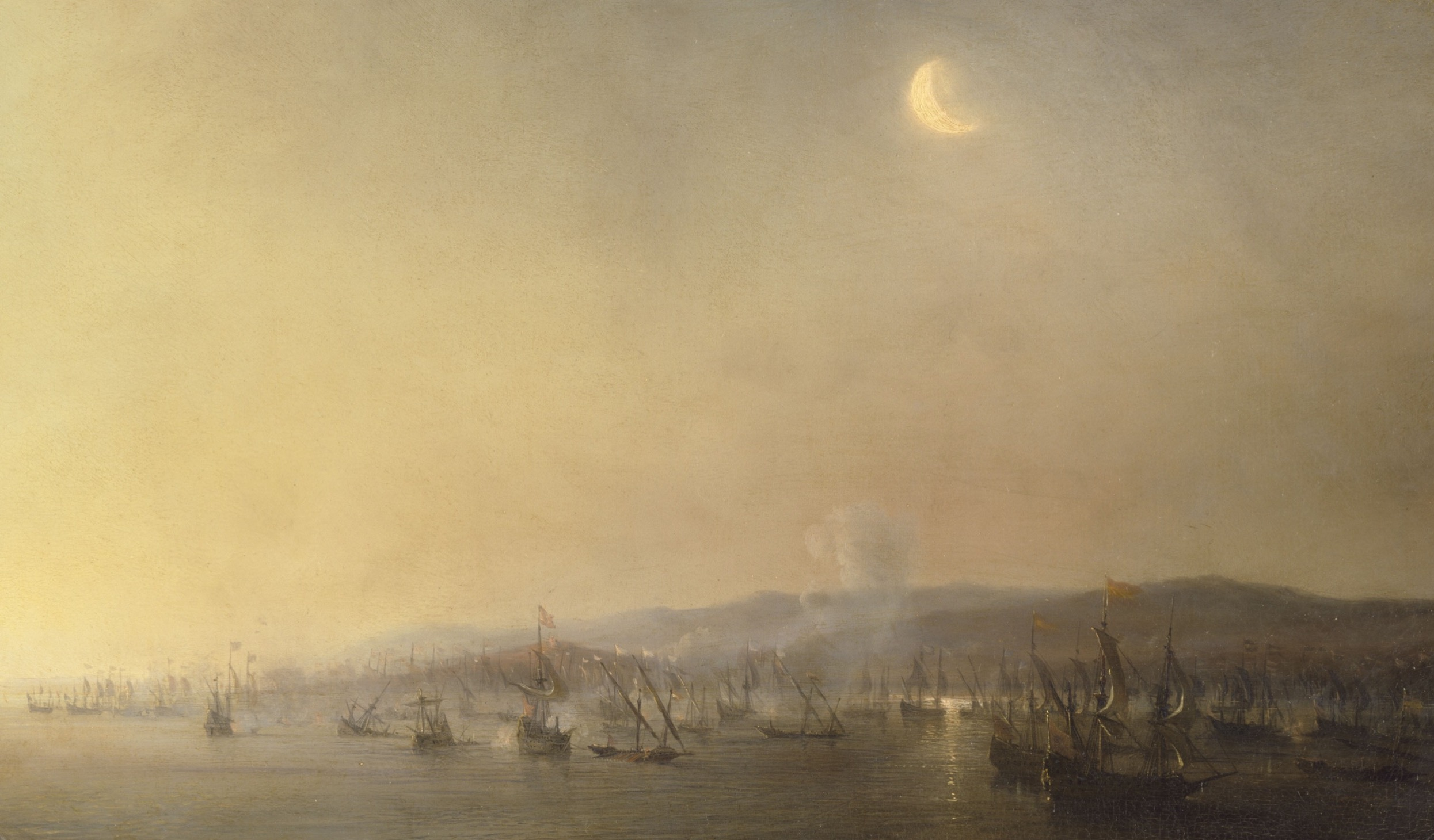
- Naval battle of Cartagena on 3 September 1643; Théodore Gudin, 1844
Date	3 September 1643
Location	Off Cartagena, Mediterranean Sea
Result	French victory

Belligerents
France	Spain

Commanders and leaders
(Kingdom of France) Jean Armand de Maillé-Brézé	(Spain) Martín Carlos de Mencos (Spain) Joos Petersen

Strength
20 galleons 2 frigates 12 fire ships	29 galleons 14 galleys

Casualties and losses
Low	3 ships unknown men killed

The Battle of Cartagena was a naval battle fought on 3 September 1643, during the Thirty Years' War off Cabo de Gata near Cartagena, Spain.

After a series of victories in 1641 and 1642 the French Navy dominated the Western Mediterranean Sea. France was also in control of most of Catalonia after the Catalan Revolt.
At that time, the Spanish Navy did not dare to show itself off the Catalan coast.

In 1643 the French admiral Jean Armand de Maillé-Brézé sailed south, to search for and destroy the Spanish fleet to extend the dominance of the French Navy in the Mediterranean.
He found a fleet of Dunkirkers under Joos Petersen, ships from Naples and a squadron from the Mar Oceano fleet under Martín Carlos de Mencos.

On 3 September at 7:00 AM Maillé-Brézé attacked with favorable winds and dispersed the enemy fleet. He sank 2 galleons and captured 2 others, while the rest of the Spanish fleet retreated into the port of Cartagena. Here 8 more ships were beyond repair and sank.

The port was closed by the Duke of Fernandina and no Spanish ship left the harbour for more than a year.

All commerce between Spain and Italy was thus made impossible. The victory was short-lived for the French, however, as Spanish dominance in the region returned when the French fleet declined after the death of Cardinal Richelieu.
