= Battle of Cádiz (1640) =

Naval battle in the Franco-Spanish War

Coordinates: 36°29′39″N 6°13′1″W

- Part of the Franco-Spanish War (1635–1659)
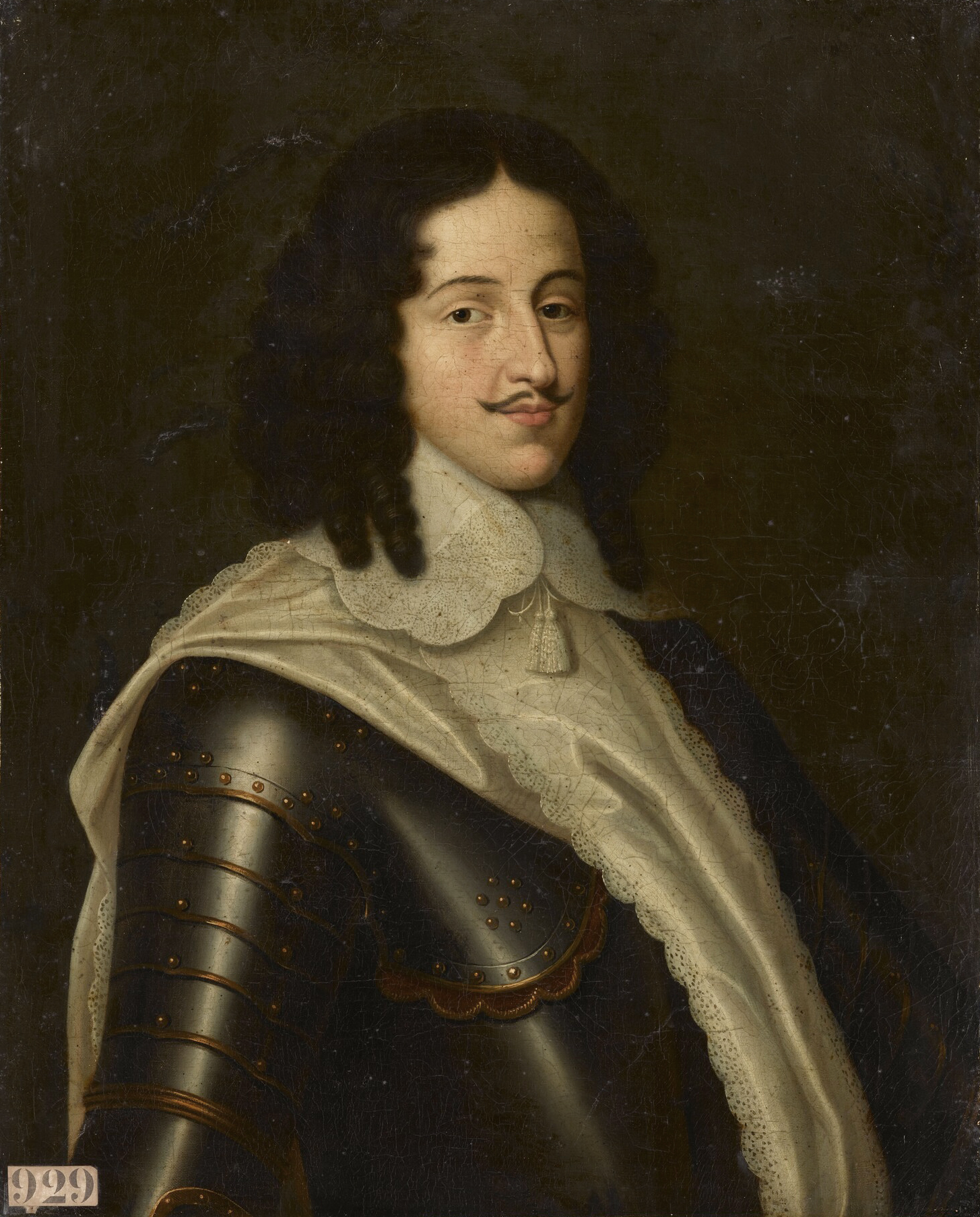
| Date | 21 July 1640 (Julian calendar) |
| Location | Bay of Cádiz |
| Result | French victory |

Belligerents
| (Spain) Spanish Empire | France |

Commanders and leaders
| (Spain) Jerónimo Gómez de Sandoval | (Kingdom of France) Jean Armand de Maillé-Brézé |

Strength
| 10 galleons, 1 patache | 24 galleons, 12 fireships |

Casualties and losses
| 1 galleon burned, 1 patache sunk | Unknown |

The Battle of Cádiz (1640) was a naval battle in the Franco-Spanish War (1635-1659), which took place on July 21, 1640, when a French squadron under Jean Armand de Maillé-Brézé attacked a Spanish convoy coming from the Americas.

The attack occurred just in front of the coast of Cádiz. Armand de Breze employed a hitherto unknown tactic to attack the Spanish convoy from both sides. The Spanish lost a galleon and a small vessel but the convoy completed its journey and delivered most of its cargoes including its silver bullion. French losses are unknown.
