= 1646 in France =

- Decades: 1620s; 1630s; 1640s; 1650s; 1660s
- See also: History of France; Timeline of French history; List of years in France

Events from the year 1646 in France.

== Incumbents ==
- Monarch – Louis XIV
- Regent: Anne of Austria

== Events ==
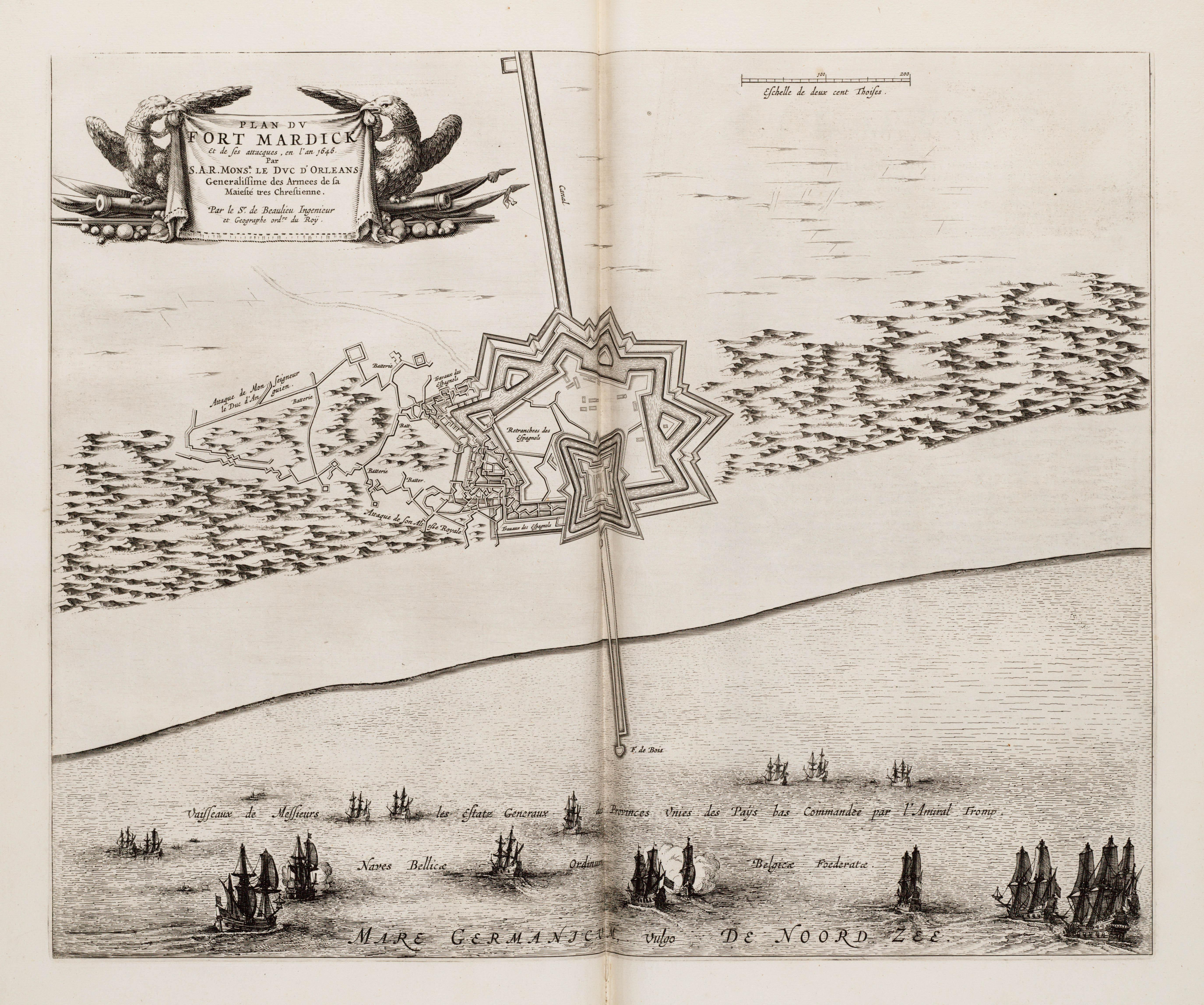
Map of Fort Mardijck. The attacks on the city of 1646 are depicted.

- March – Nicolas de Neufville is made governor of the young Louis XIV by the queen-mother
- 14 June – The Battle of Orbetello of the Franco-Spanish War takes place, resulting in a Spanish victory
- 4 July – Pierre Teuleron, sieur de Repentigny, granted Jules Trottier II land in La Rochelle to build and develop New France, under the authorization of Jacques Le Neuf de la Poterie.
- 4 August – Louis, le Grand Condé takes Mardyck in the Siege of Dunkirk
- 10 August – The French and Swedish armies unite in Wetzlar for the Bavarian campaign
- 29 August – Declaration du Roy is published by King Louis XIV
- 7 September – Louis, le Grand Condé takes Veurne in the Siege of Dunkirk
- 23 September – Le Cardinal arrives in Quebec (New France) with Jules Trottier II and his family
- 10 October – France takes Dunkirk from the Spanish Netherlands for the first time.
- 20 October – Nicolas de Neufville is promoted to marshal of France

=== Undated ===
- Amsterdam artists Lambert Doomer (1624–1700) and Willem Schellinks (1627–1678) journey from Nantes to Paris. Doomer extensively documented what they saw in his publication, Tour de France 1646.

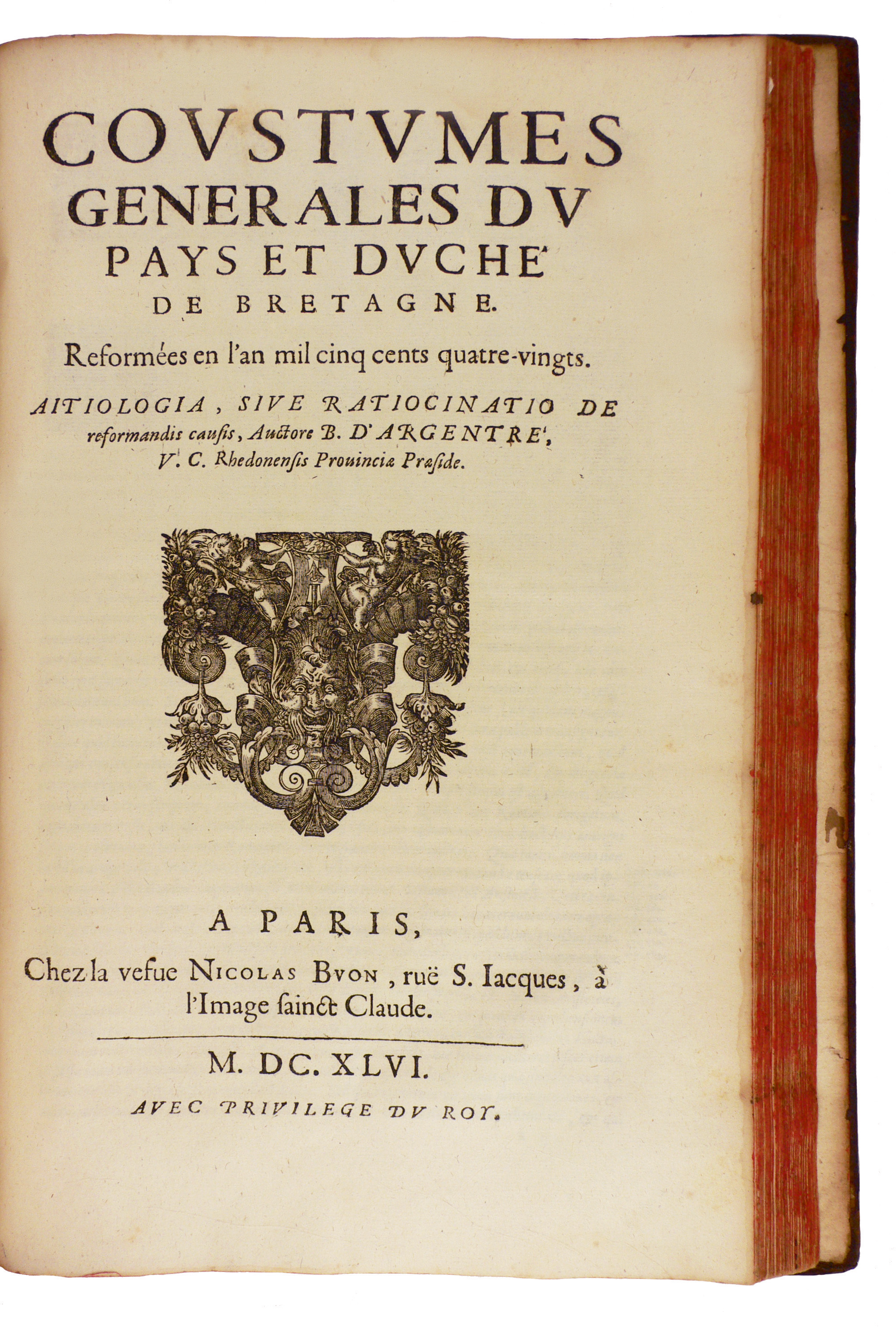
Cover page of Coustumes generales du Pays

== Works ==
=== Books ===
- Coustumes generales du Pays by Bertrand d'Argentré (1519–1590) is published by Nicolas Buon
- Declaration du Roy is published by King Louis XIV
- La doctrine des moeurs (English: The Doctrine of Morals) by Marin le Roy de Gomberville
- Règlement de la Communauté by Saint Nicolas of Liancourt
- Les oeuvres de Me Guy Coquille, sr de Romenay is published by Maître A. Loysel and Anthoine de Cay in Paris
- L’Art de régner ou le Sage gouverneur by Gillet de La Tessonerie
- Question celebre. S'il est nécessaire, ou non, que les filles soient sçavantes by Anna Maria van Schurman
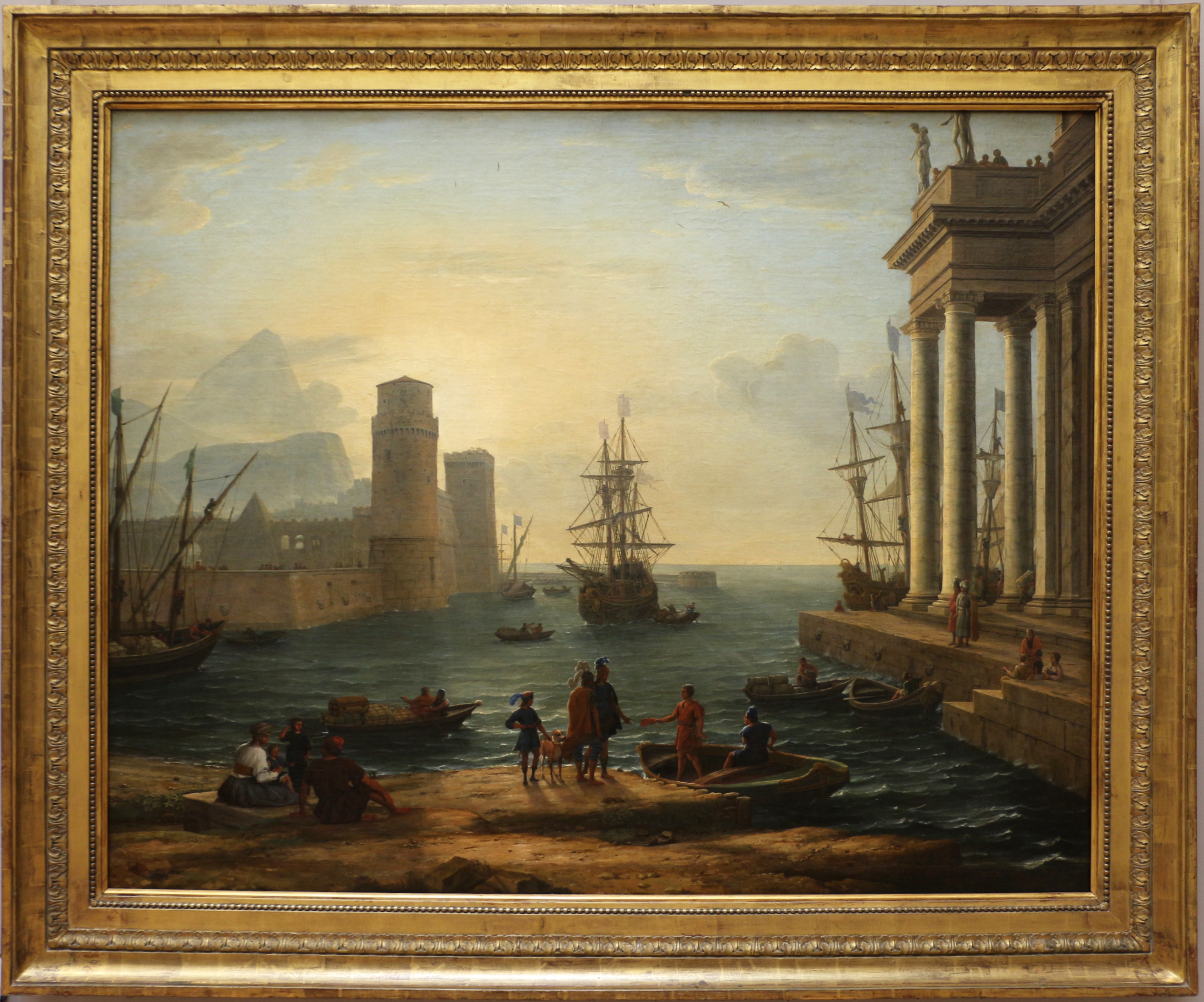
  Port de mer, effet de brume, Claude Lorrain, 1646

=== Buildings ===
- Construction begins on the Church of Saint-Sulpice, founded by parish priest Jean-Jacques Olier
- The Hôtel de Sourdéac is built in Paris
- The Hôtel Thuriot de la Rosière is built in Paris
- Église Saint-Martin de Vern-sur-Seiche is built in Ille-et-Vilaine
- Chapelle Sainte-Anne de La Grasserie is built in Ille-et-Vilaine
- Chapelle Sainte-Marguerite is built in Locoal-Mendon, canton of Belz
- The temple of Le Collet-de-Dèze is built
- The Église Notre-Dame is built in Chambéry
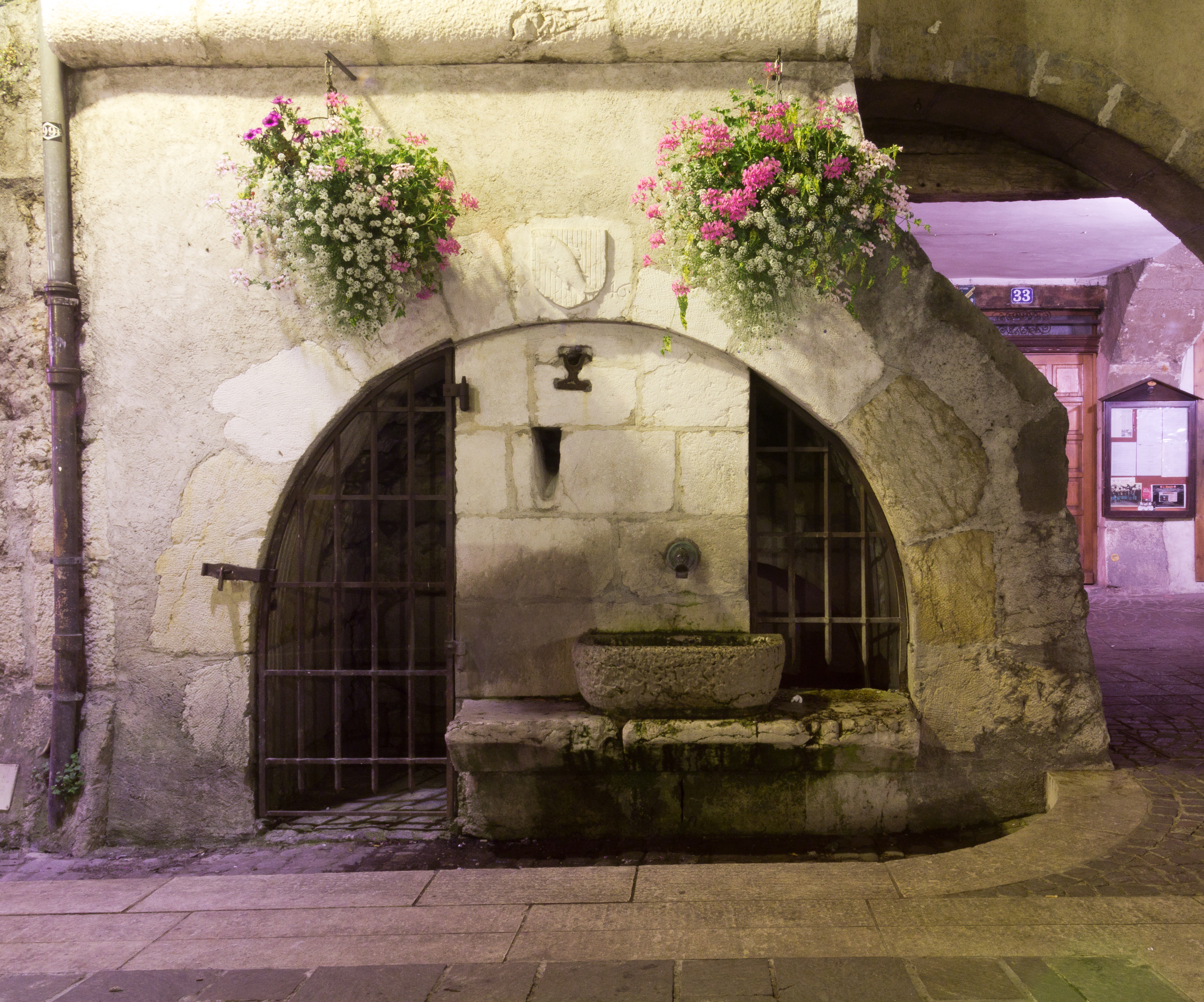
  Quiberet fountain in Annecy, built 1646

=== Paintings ===
- Port de mer, effet de brume by Claude Lorrain
- Le couronnement de Sainte-Cécile by Fournier
- Un miracle du frère Francisco by Bartolomé Esteban Murillo
- Mariage de l'Électeur de Brandebourg by Johannes Mytens
- Saint Bruno révèle en songe au comte Roger une conspiration contre ui by Eustache Le Sueur
- Uranie by Eustache Le Sueur
- Énée et ses compagnons combattant les Harpies by François Perrier
- Solomon making a sacrifice to the idols by Sébastien Bourdon
- Anne of Austria with her children by the workshop of Philippe de Champaigne

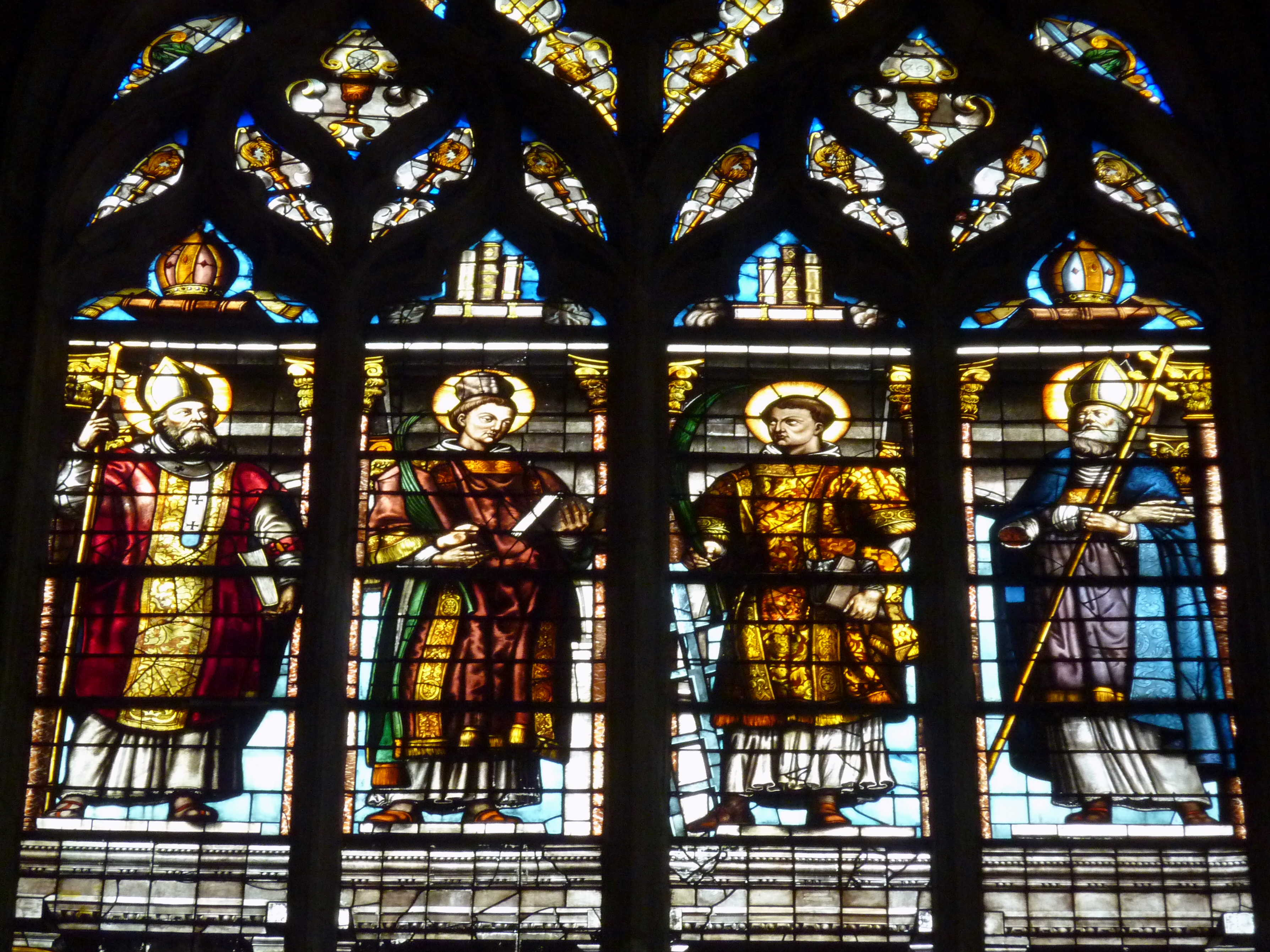
1646 stained glass installation of the Saint-Étienne Cathedral in Sens

=== Other ===
- Germain Pillon finishes work on the organ of Mitry-Mory Saint-Martin
- The Quiberet fountain is built in Annecy
- The transept stained glass windows of Saint-Étienne Cathedral in Sens are installed

== Births ==
- 17 February – Pierre Le Pesant, sieur de Boisguilbert, lawmaker (died 1714)
- 10 October – Françoise-Marguerite de Sévigné, aristocrat (died 1705)
- Nicolas de Fer, cartographer (died 1720)

== Deaths ==
- 12 May – Énemond Massé, Jesuit missionary (born 1575)
- 14 June – Jean Armand de Maillé-Brézé, admiral (born 1619)
- 22 June – Daniel Dumonstier, artist (born 1574)
- 27 June – Achille d'Étampes de Valençay, military leader and Catholic Cardinal (born 1593)
- 22 September – Jean François Niceron, mathematician (born 1613)
- 23 December – François Maynard, poet (born 1582)
- 26 December – Henri II, Prince of Condé, French prince (born 1588)

== Gallery ==
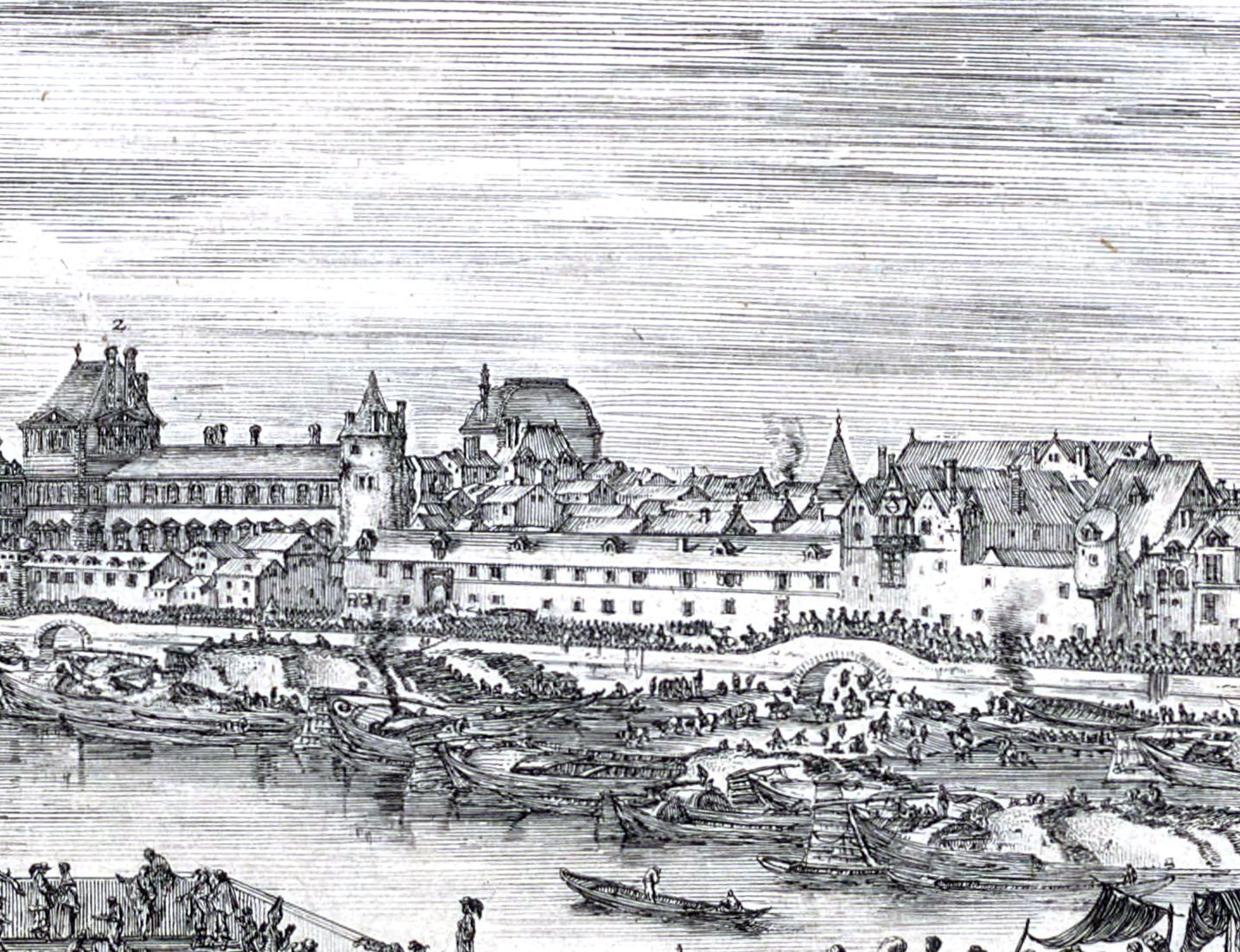
View of the river facade of the Hôtel du Petit-Bourbon from the Place Dauphine in Paris, with the Louvre Palace on the left. Stefano della Bella, 1646.

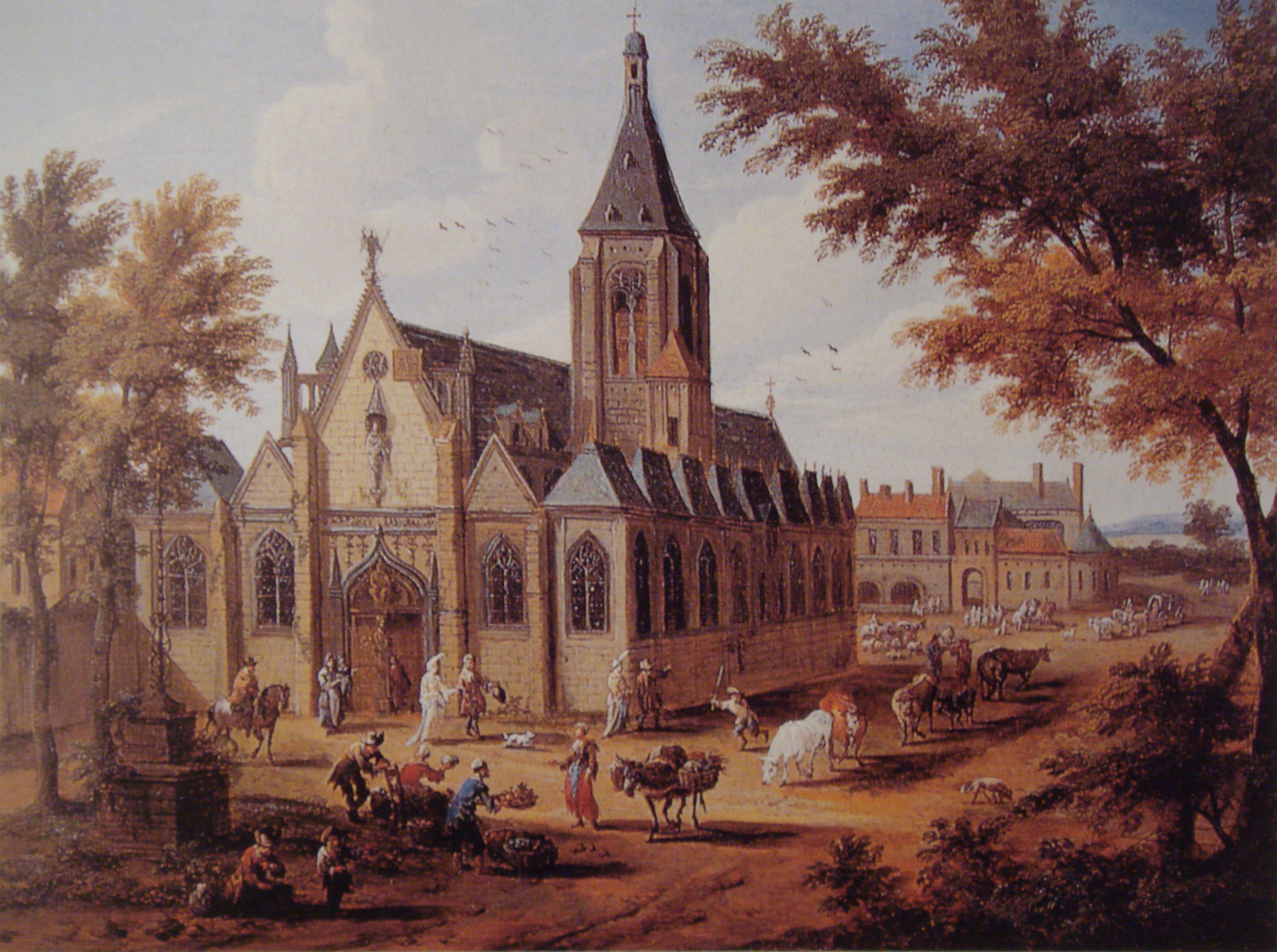
Engraving of the 1646 Church of Saint-Sulpice, c. 17th century

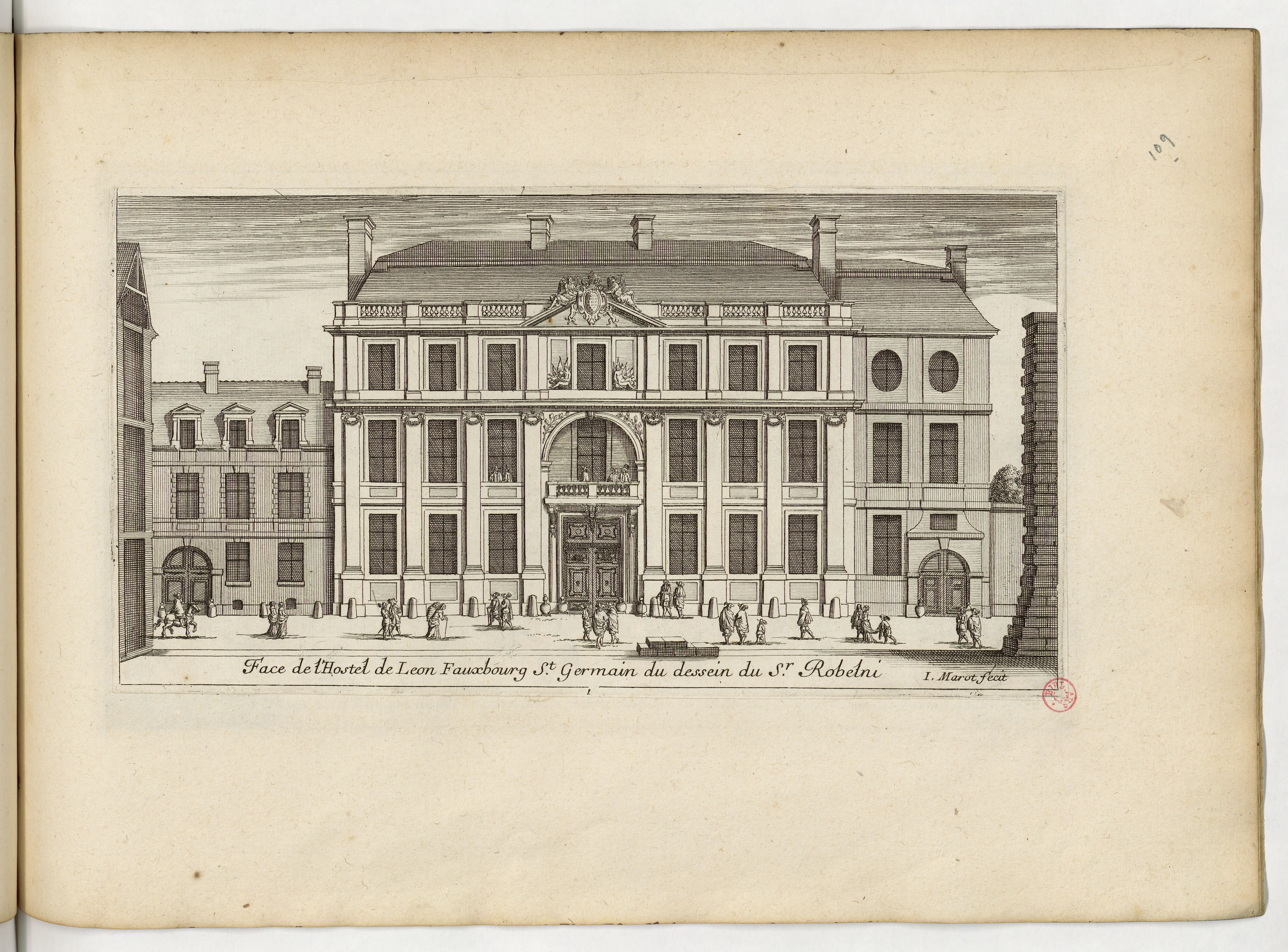
Hôtel de Sourdéac, built 1646. Engraving c. 17th -18th century.

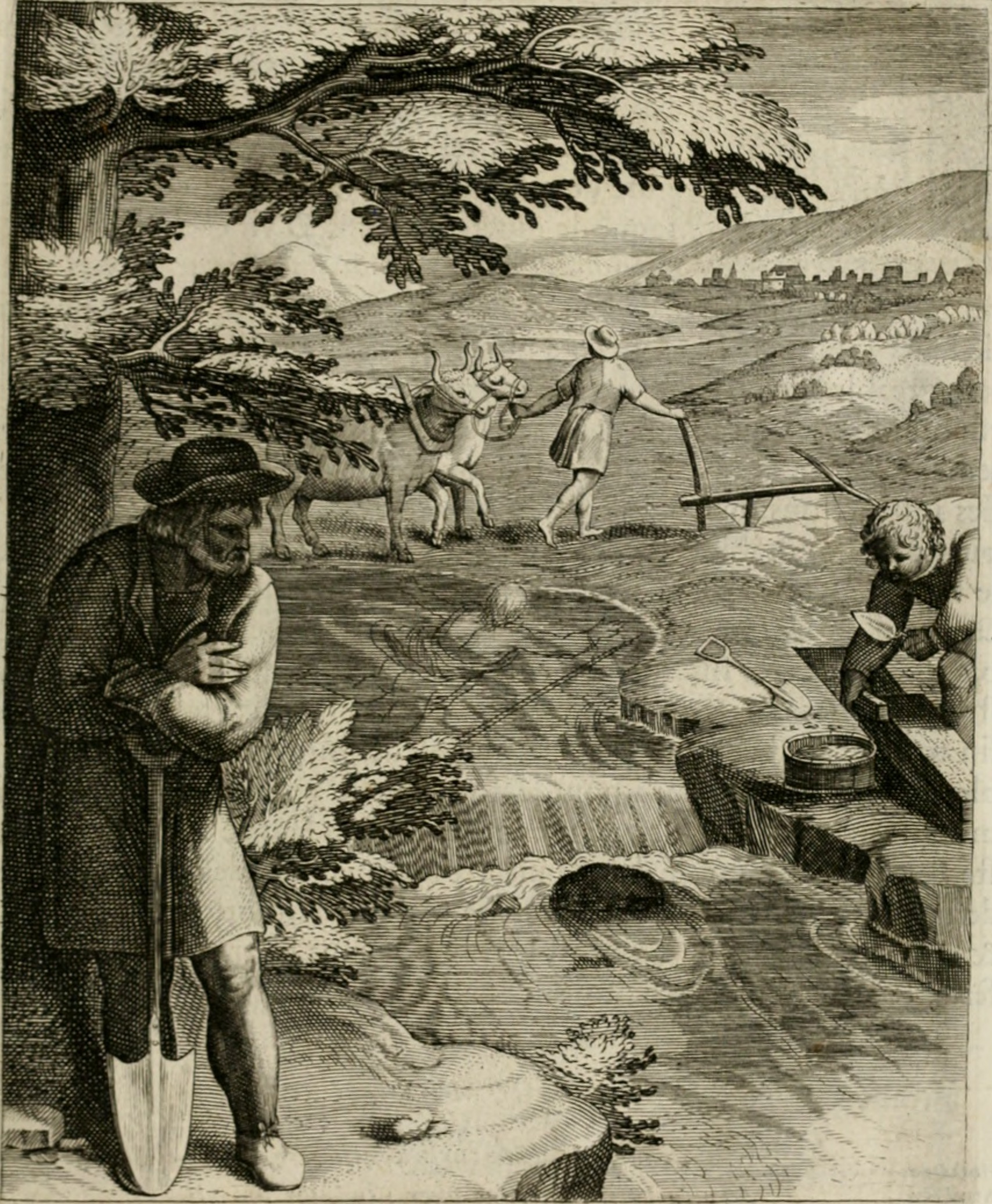
An image from Au Roy's 1946 emblem book, La doctrine des meours

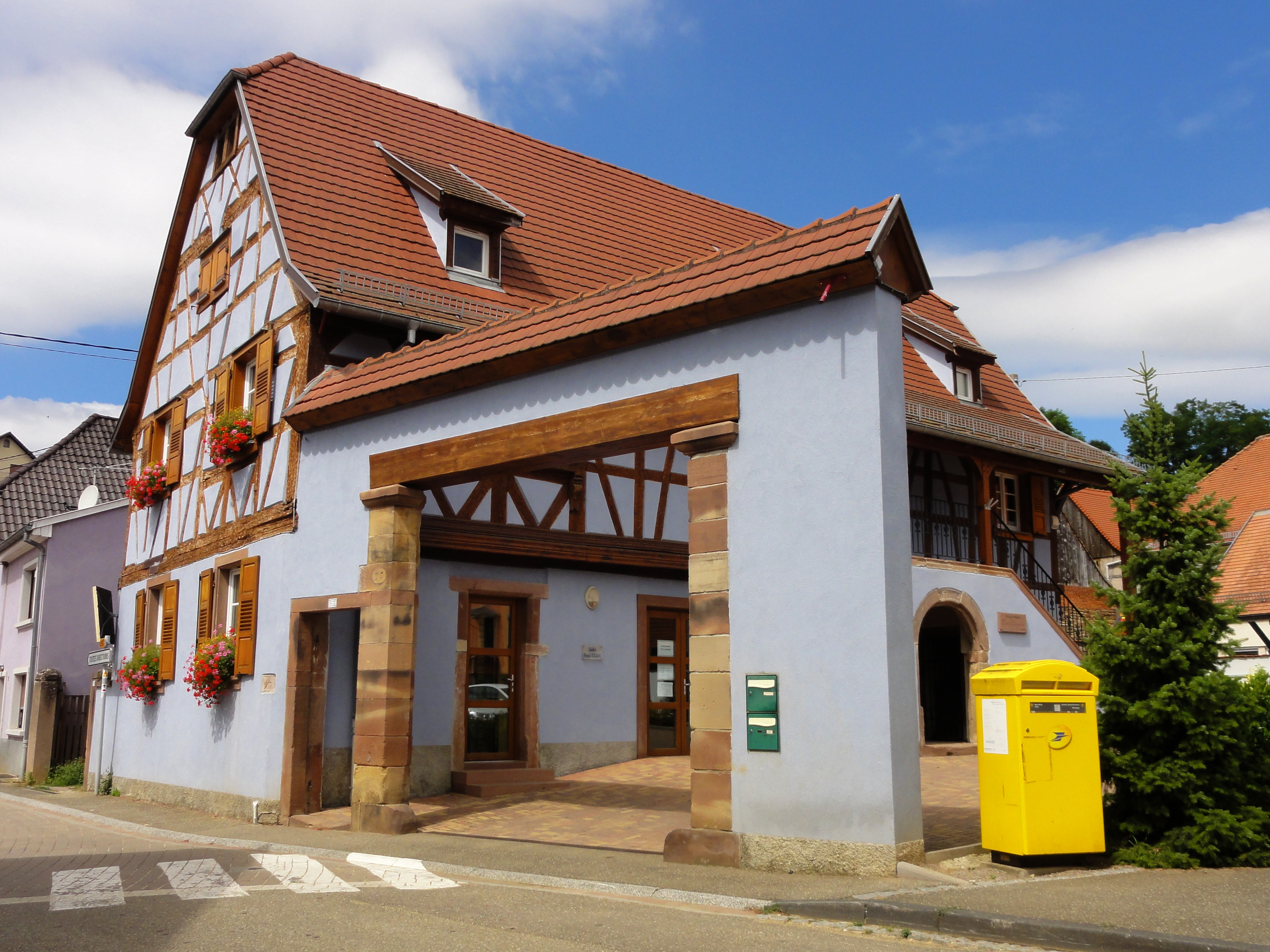
Farmhouse in Alsace, Bas-Rhin built in 1646

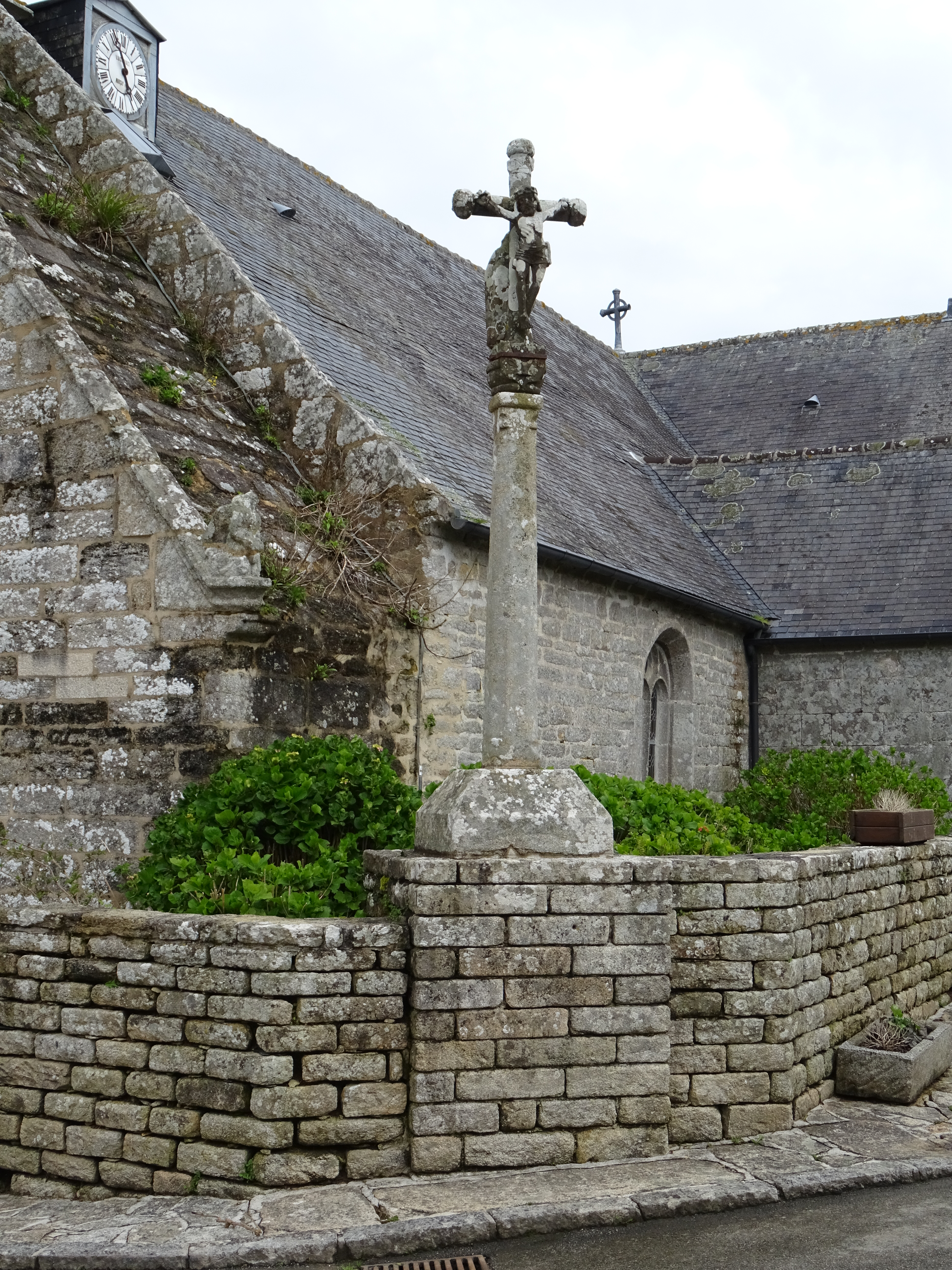
1646-built calvary on the wall of the parish close to the Church of Saint-Magloire in Mahalon.

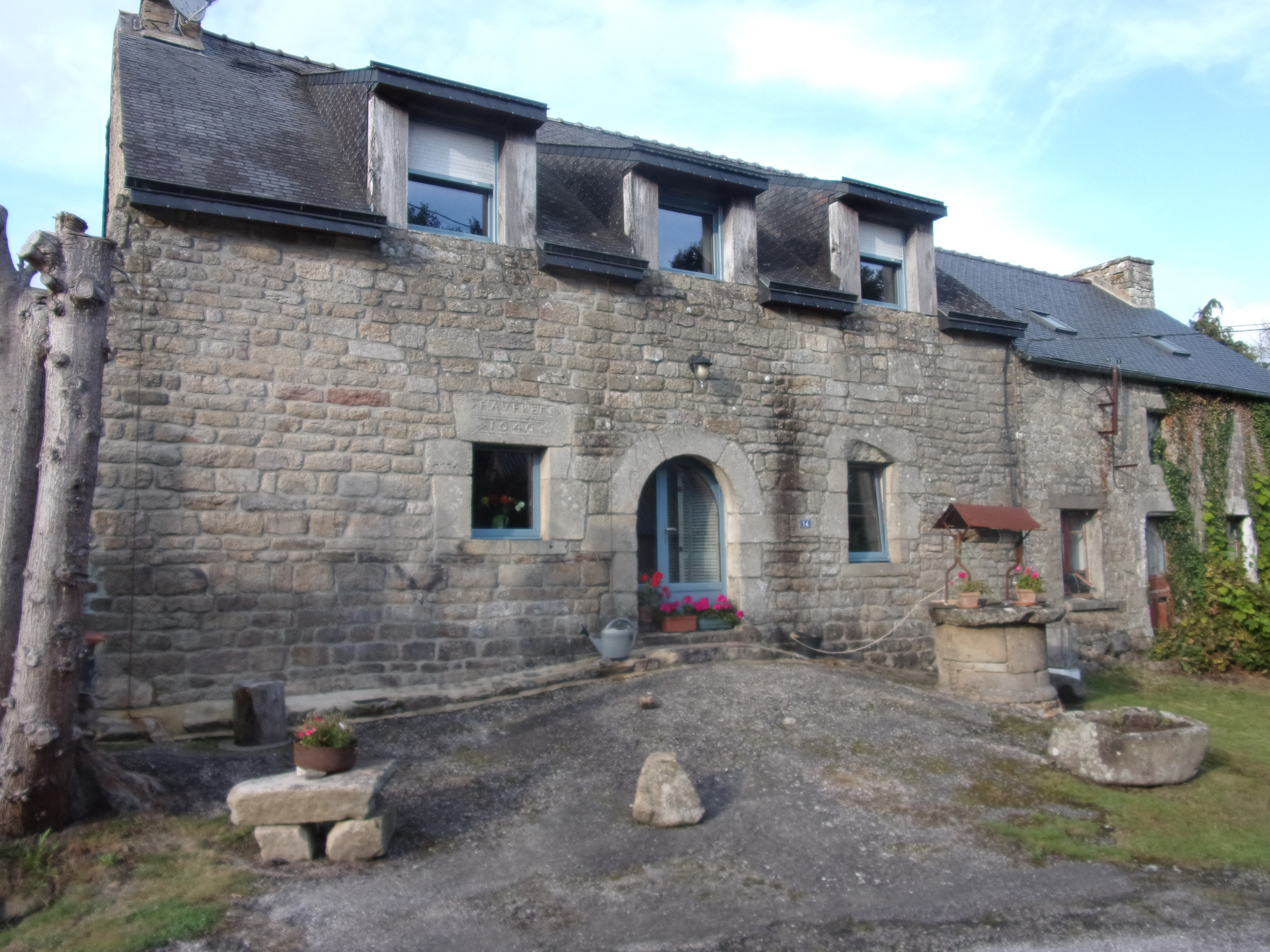
Village house in Quénépévan, Langoëlan, dating from 1646

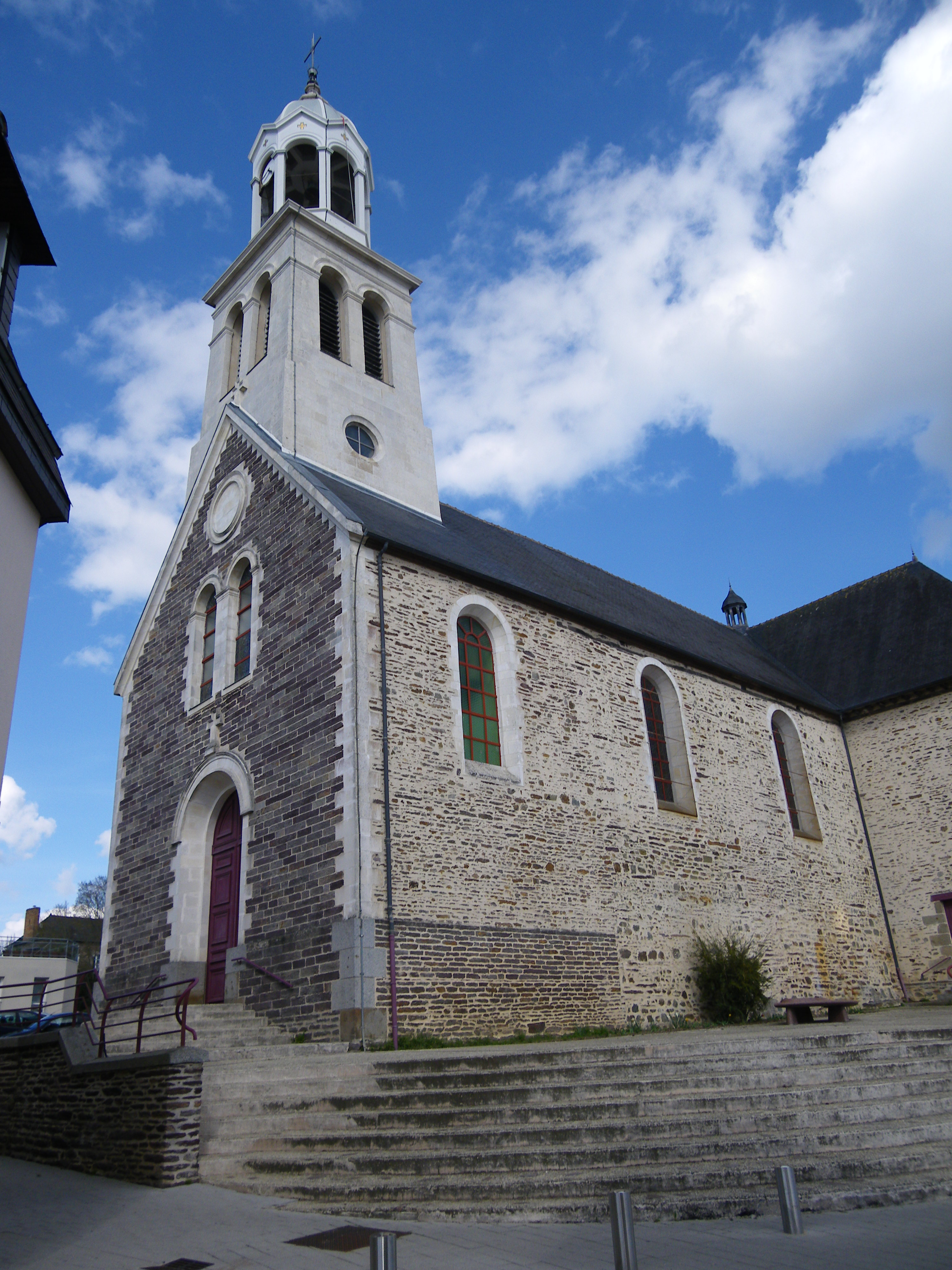
Église Saint-Martin de Vern-sur-Seiche, built in 1646

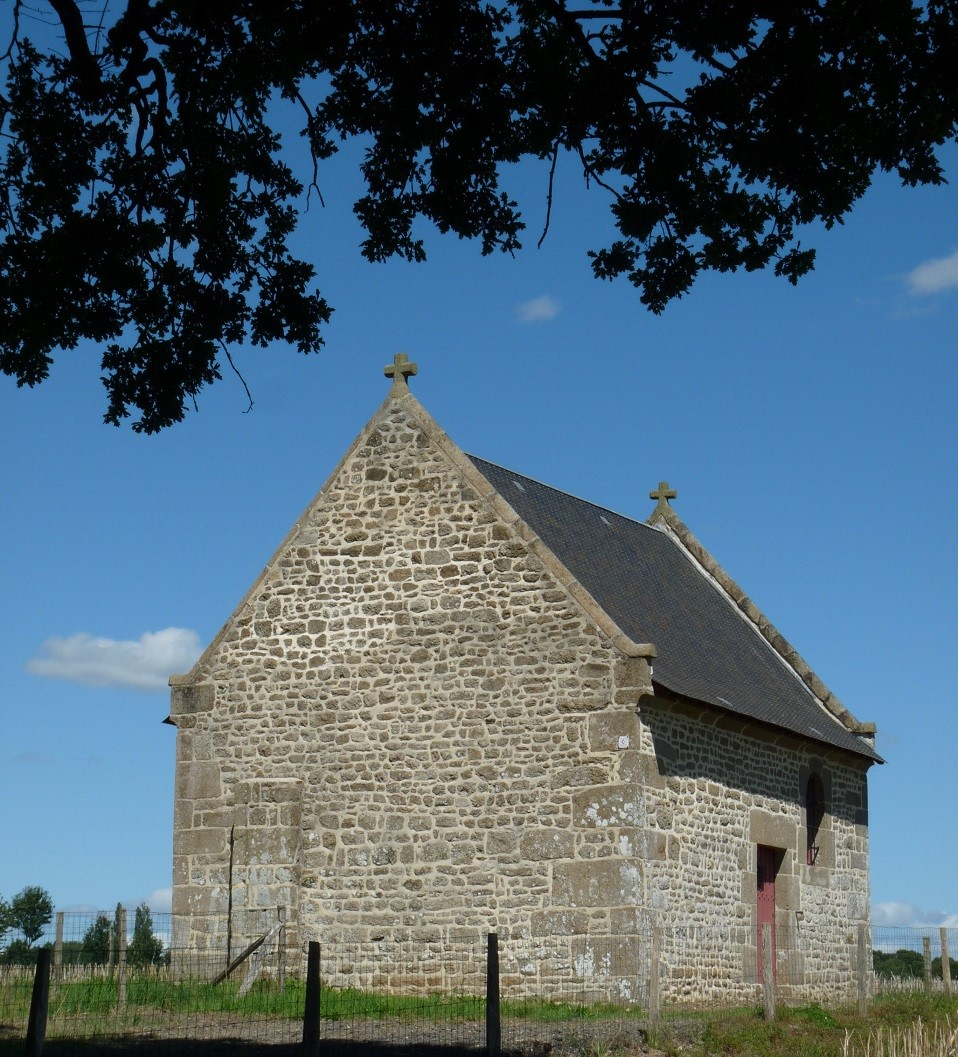
Chapelle Sainte-Anne de La Grasserie à Louvigné-du-Désert, built in 1646

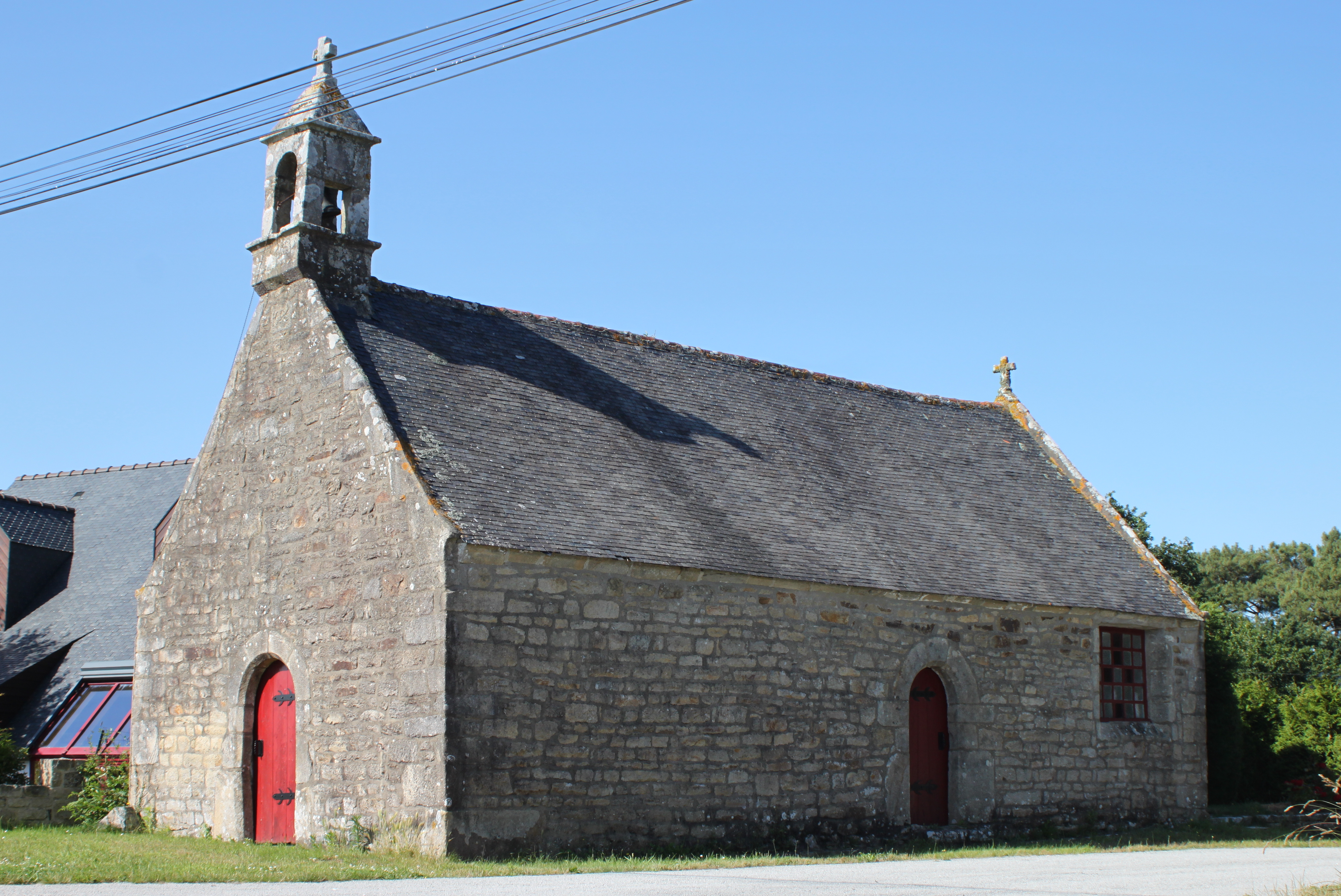
Chapelle Sainte-Marguerite, built in 1646

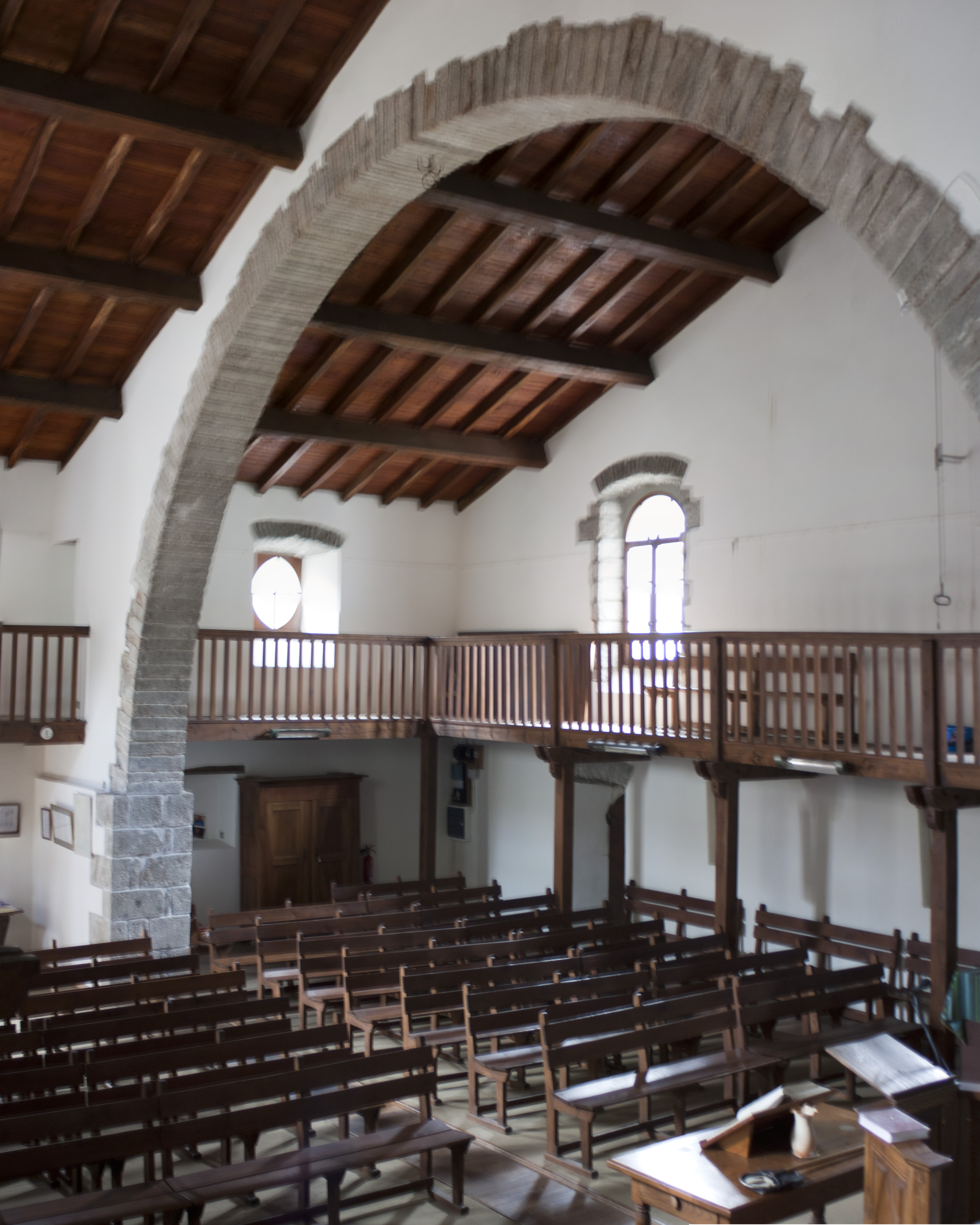
Interior of Le Collet de Dèze's 1646 temple

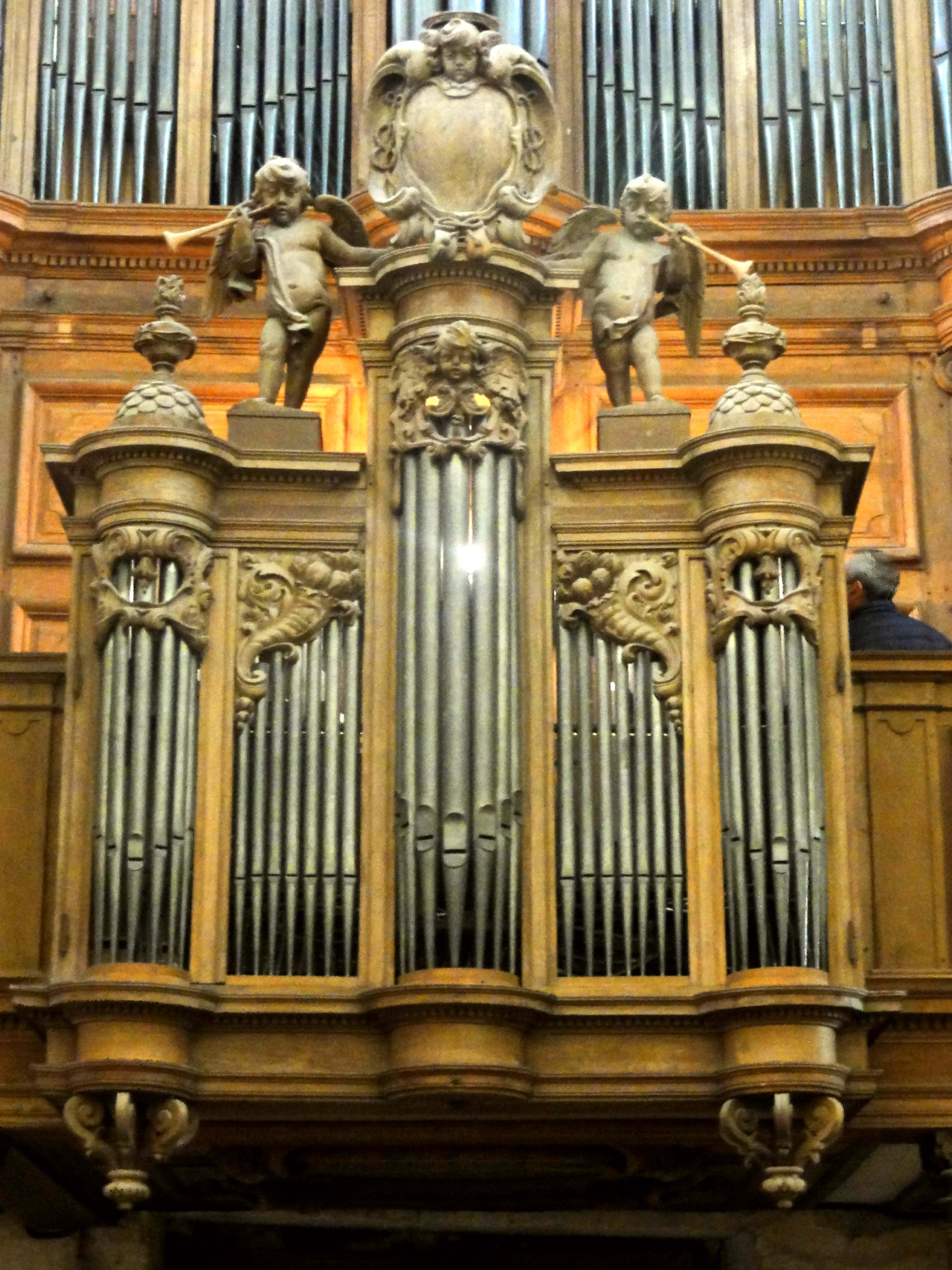
Mitry-Mory Saint-Martin organ
