= Lalouette =

Lalouette is a surname. Notable people with the surname include:

- Claire Lalouette, French Egyptologist
- Éric Lalouette (born 1951), French racing cyclist
- Jean-François Lalouette (1651–1728), French composer
- Kévin Lalouette (born 1984), French road and track cyclist
- Pierre Lalouette (1711–1792), French anatomist

== See also ==
- Lalouette's pyramid, Thyroid
