= 1651 in France =

- Decades: 1630s; 1640s; 1650s; 1660s; 1670s
- See also: History of France; Timeline of French history; List of years in France

Events from the year 1651 in France.

== Incumbents ==
- Monarch – Louis XIV
- Regent – Anne of Austria (until 7 September)

== Events ==
- The Lycée Stendhal was founded
- Château de Maisons was completed

== Births ==
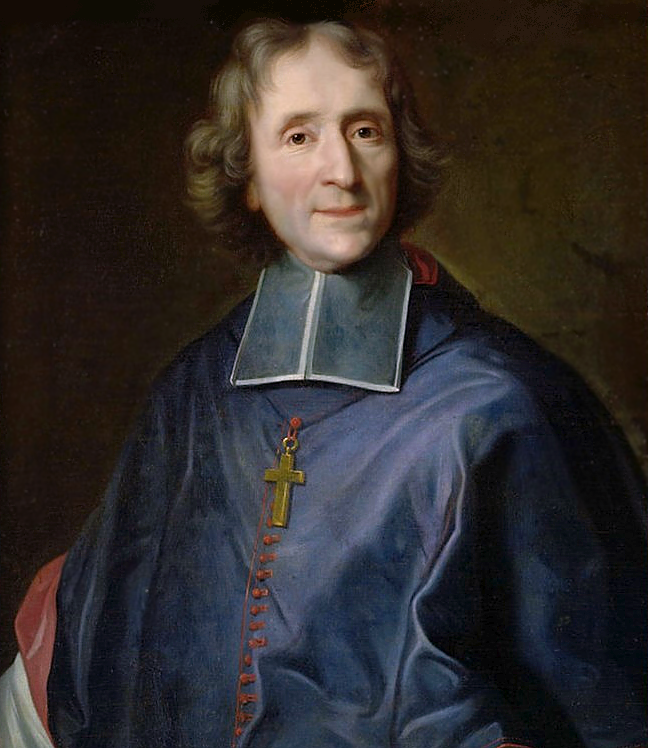
François Fénelon

- 26 February – Jean Beausire, architect, engineer and fountain-maker (d. 1743)
- 30 April – Jean-Baptiste de La Salle, priest and educational reformer (d. 1719)
- 27 May – Louis Antoine de Noailles, bishop and cardinal (d. 1729)
- 4 July – Honoratus a Sancta Maria, controversialist (d. 1729).
- 6 August – François Fénelon, Roman Catholic archbishop, theologian, poet and writer (d. 1715)
- 1 November – Jean-Baptiste Colbert, Marquis de Seignelay, politician (d. 1690)

=== Full date missing ===
- Frère Jacques Beaulieu, urologist (d. 1720)
- Magdelaine Chapelain, fortune teller and poisoner (d. 1724)
- Jean-François Lalouette, composer (d. 1728)
- Jacques-François de Monbeton de Brouillan, military officer and governor (d. 1705)
- Philibert-Emmanuel de Froulay, chevalier de Tessé, army commander (d. 1701)
- Guy Tachard, Jesuit missionary and mathematician (d. 1712)

== Deaths ==
- 8 July – Charlotte des Essarts, noblewoman (b. between 1580 and 1588)
- 23 August – Jacques-Philippe Cornut, physician and botanist (b. 1606)

=== Full date missing ===
- Angélique Paulet, précieuse, singer and lute-playing musician (b. 1592)
- Catherine Arnauld, religious figure (b. 1590)
- François II de Beauharnais, politician
- Jacqueline de Bueil, noblewoman (b. 1588)
