= 1648 in France =

- Decades: 1620s; 1630s; 1640s; 1650s; 1660s
- See also: History of France; Timeline of French history; List of years in France

Events from the year 1648 in France.

== Incumbents ==
- Monarch – Louis XIV
- Regent: Anne of Austria

== Events ==
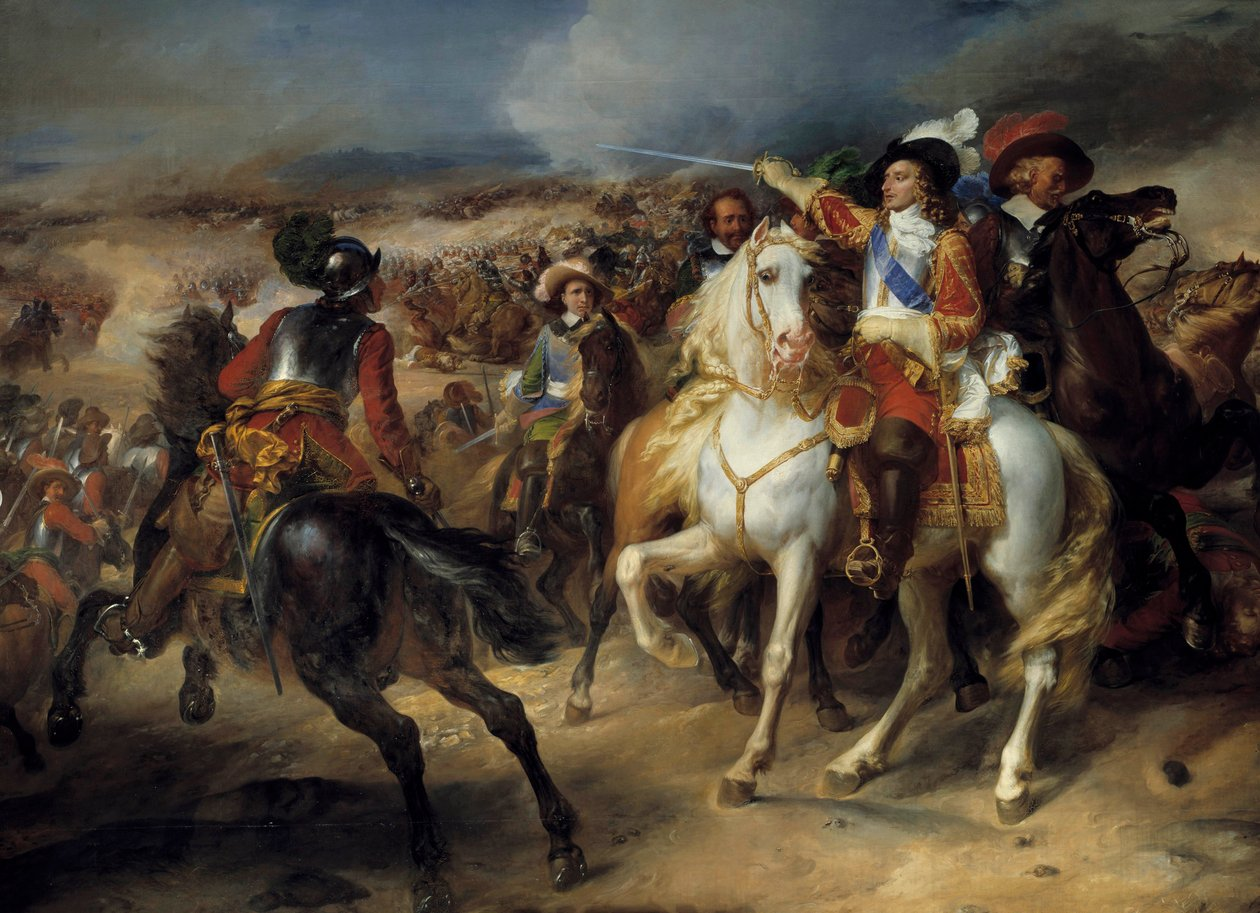
Battle of Lens

- 23 March – Treaty of Concordia
- 17 May – Battle of Zusmarshausen
- 20 August – Battle of Lens

== Births ==
- 5 August – Guichard Joseph Duverney, anatomist (died 1730)

== Deaths ==
=== Full date missing ===
- François de Cauvigny de Colomby, poet, translator and King's counsellor (born c.1588)
- Vincent Voiture, writer (born 1597)
- Isaac de Caus, architect and landscaper (born 1590)
- Marin Mersenne, philosopher, mathematician and music theorist, "father of acoustics" (born 1588)
