= 1642 in France =

- Decades: 1620s; 1630s; 1640s; 1650s; 1660s
- See also: History of France; Timeline of French history; List of years in France

Events of the year 1642 in France.

== Incumbents ==
- Monarch: Louis XIII

== Events ==
- 11-12 June: Cinq-Mars conspiracy: Henri Coiffier de Ruzé, Marquis of Cinq-Mars, personal favourite of the king, and Gaston, Duke of Orléans, the king's brother, plot against Cardinal Richelieu, the prime minister. Cinq-Mars attempts to get support for the rebellion from Philip IV of Spain but Richelieu's spy service catches him doing so and he is imprisoned and beheaded in the Place des Terreaux in Lyon for high treason along with another conspirator, François Auguste de Thou.
- 9 September: Reapers' War: Siege of Perpignan: Perpignan is conquered by Franco-Catalan forces led by Charles de La Porte after a 10-month siege.
- Briare Canal opens throughout, the first summit level canal in Europe built using pound locks.

== Births ==
- 6 January: Julien Garnier, Jesuit missionary to Canada (d. 1730)
- 18 February: Marie Champmeslé, actress (d. 1698)
- 21 April: Simon de la Loubère, diplomat, writer, mathematician and poet (d. 1729)
- 27 April: Francisque Millet, Flemish-born landscape painter (d. 1679)
- 18 June: Paul Tallement the Younger, writer (d. 1712)
- 11 November: André Charles Boulle, cabinetmaker (d. 1732)
- 24 November: Anne Hilarion de Tourville, naval commander (d. 1701)
- 8 December: Nicolas Roland, priest (d. 1678)
- 30 December: François Roger de Gaignières, genealogist, antiquary and collector (d. 1715)
- Michel Corneille the Younger, painter, etcher and engraver (d. 1708)

== Deaths ==
- 14 May: Nicolas Ysambert, theologian (b. c. 1565)
- 3 July: Marie de' Medici, queen consort and regent (b. 1573)
- 12 August: Henri Coiffier de Ruzé, Marquis of Cinq-Mars, executed (b. 1620)
- 29 September: René Goupil, Jesuit missionary, first of the Canadian Martyrs (b. 1608)
- 1 November: Jean Nicolet, explorer, drowned in Saint Lawrence River (b. 1598)
- 4 December: Cardinal Richelieu, statesman (b. 1585)
