= 1650 in France =

- Decades: 1630s; 1640s; 1650s; 1660s; 1670s
- See also: History of France; Timeline of French history; List of years in France

Events from the year 1650 in France.

== Incumbents ==
- Monarch: Louis XIV
- Regent: Anne of Austria

== Events ==
- Jews are allowed to return to France and England.

== Births ==
- October 9 – René Auguste Constantin de Renneville, French writer (d. 1723)
- December 25 – Claude Aveneau, French missionary (d. 1711)
