= 1649 in France =

- Decades: 1620s; 1630s; 1640s; 1650s; 1660s
- See also: History of France; Timeline of French history; List of years in France

Events from the year 1649 in France.

== Incumbents ==
- Monarch – Louis XIV
- Regent: Anne of Austria

== Events ==
- 11 March – signing of the Peace of Rueil

== Births ==
- 22 February – Bon Boullogne, painter (died 1717)
- 5 September – Louise de Kérouaille, Duchess of Portsmouth, mistress of Charles II of England (died 1734)

== Deaths ==
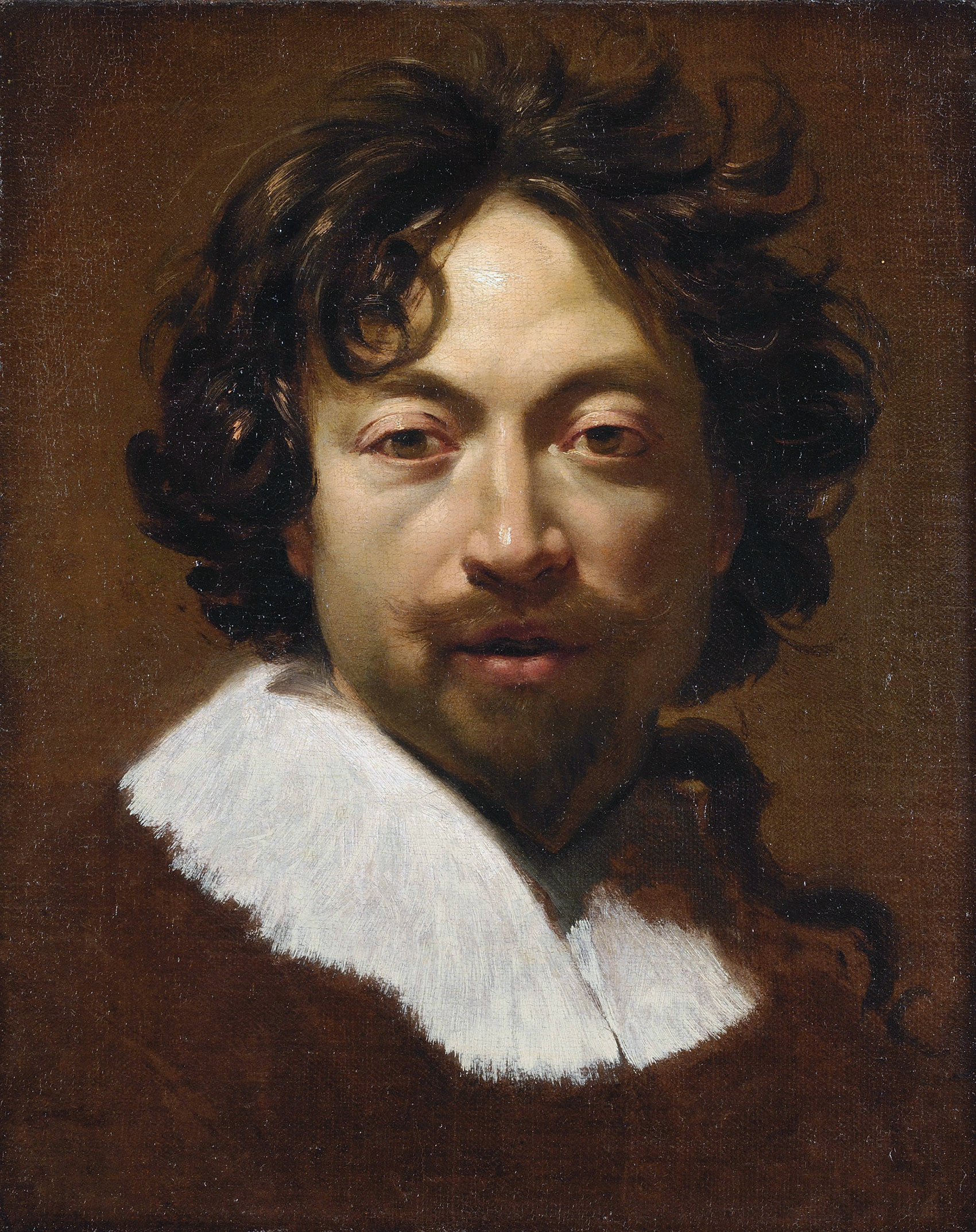
Simon Vouet, self-portrait

- 24 April – Gaston Jean Baptiste de Renty, aristocrat and philanthropist (born 1611)
- 30 June – Simon Vouet, painter and draftsman (born 1590)
- 30 October – Honoré d'Albert, duke (born 1581)

=== Full date missing ===
- Jean Sirmond, poet and historiographer (born 1589)
- Christophe Justel, scholar (born 1580)
- François Véron, Jesuit controversialist (born c.1575)
