= Pierre Vallet =

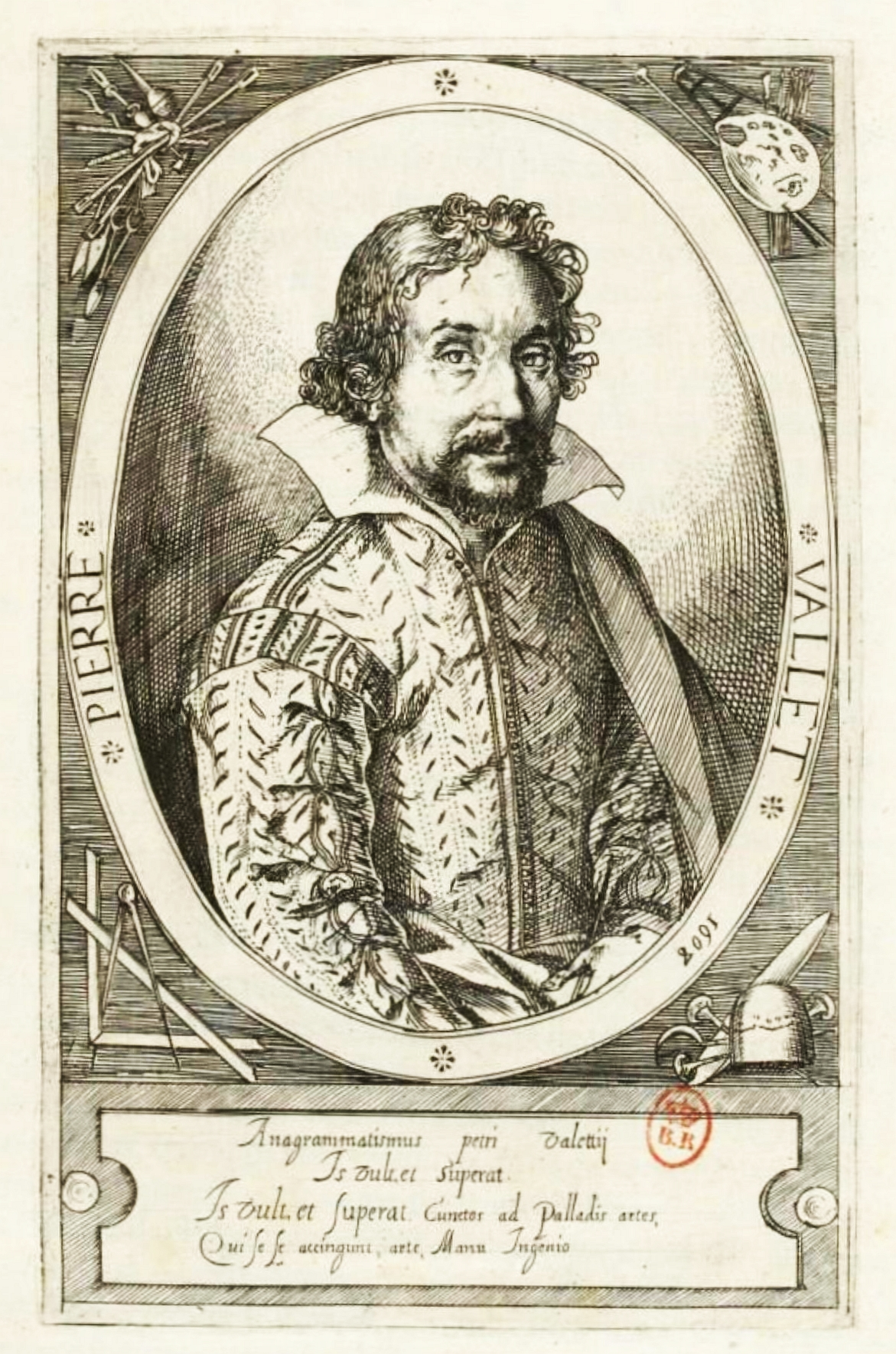
Pierre Vallet, self portrait, 1608

Pierre Vallet (c. 1575, Orléans – 1657) was a French botanical artist, engraver and embroidery designer. He worked as a "Brodeur ordinaire du Roy" in the court of Marie de Medicis of Florence, second wife of Henry IV of France. Vallet made botanical illustrations, along with Jean Robin, for the Le Jardin du tres Chrestien Henry IV (1608) with plants from the garden of the Louvre Palace along with exotic curiosities from West Africa and Spain.

== Life and work ==
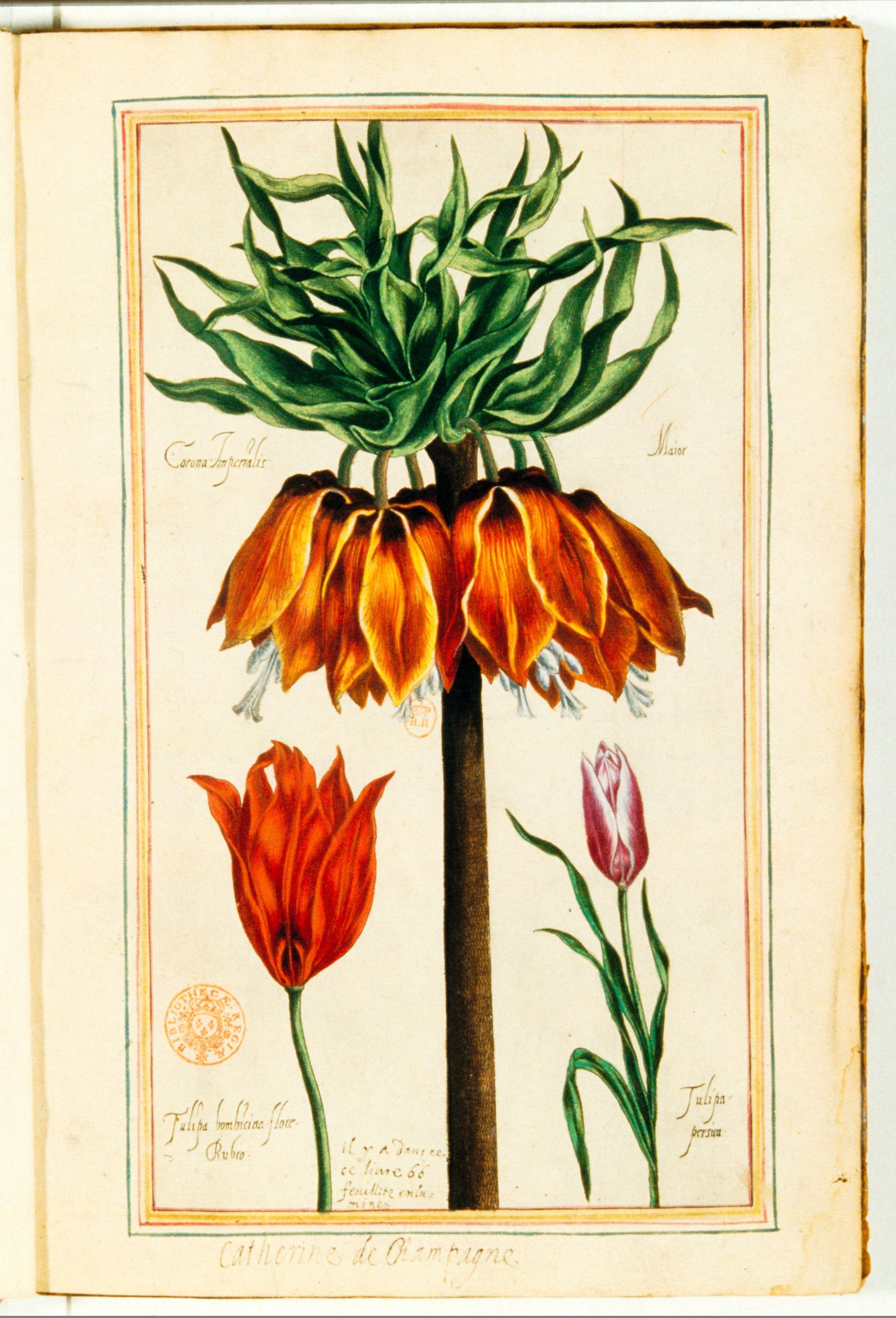
Plate from "Le Jardin du roy très chrestien Henry IV" showing Fritillaria imperialis and two tulips

Vallet was born in Orleans and moved to Paris where he worked as an embroiderer under the patronage of Marie de Médici of Florence (1575-1642), the second wife of Henry IV (1553-1610). Records suggest that there was a father and son who went by the name of Pierre Vallet and that the son became more well known. He used floral motifs in his work and produced the Le Jardin du très Chrestien Henry IV ('The Garden of the most Christian Henry IV') in 1608 which was meant to guide embroidery works. The second edition explicitly noted that the book was made for “those who wish to paint or illuminate, embroider or make tapestries on the basis of this present book.” The third edition in 1650 went by the title of Hortus regius. The book became a source for floral motifs in textile designs during the seventeenth century. Copies of his works were made by Johann Theodor de Bry in 'Florilegium Novum' (1611), by Emanuel Sweert in 1612, and by Friderico Barbette in 'Florilegium Novum' (1641). The French writer, Roger de Felice, noted in his book French Furniture in the Middle Ages and under Louis XIII (1923) that: "The favourite motifs for embroidery and needlework were large flowers and fruits done in natural colours. We know that the Jardin du Roi, the Jardin des Plantes of to-day, was expressly established under Henri IV, by the gardener Jean Robin and by Pierre Vallet, the king’s embroiderer, to provide the embroiderers both male and female with new models inspired by exotic plants."

Vallet also illustrated Jacques-Philippe Cornut's Canadensium plantarum published in 1635, and Les Adventures Amoureuse de Theagenes et Chariclée Sommairement Discrète et Representee par Figures (Gabriel Tavernier, Paris, 1613), the hero and heroine of an erotic 4th century romance in Greek by Heliodorus, Bishop of Trikka.
