= 1647 in France =

- Decades: 1620s; 1630s; 1640s; 1650s; 1660s
- See also: History of France; Timeline of French history; List of years in France

Events from the year 1647 in France.

== Incumbents ==
- Monarch: Louis XIV
- Regent: Anne of Austria

== Events ==
- 14 March – Thirty Years' War: France, Bavaria, Cologne, and Sweden sign the Truce of Ulm.

== Births ==
- 18 February – Denis-Nicolas Le Nourry, Benedictine scholar (d. 1724)
- 12 March – Victor-Maurice, comte de Broglie, general (d. 1727)
- 22 August – Denis Papin, inventor (d. 1713 in Great Britain)
- 18 November – Pierre Bayle, philosopher (d. 1706)
- 30 December – Jean Martianay, Benedictine scholar (d. 1717)

== Deaths ==
- 14 January – François L’Anglois, painter, engraver, printer, bookseller, publisher, and art dealer (b. 1589)
- 1 December – Joseph Gaultier de la Vallette, astronomer (b. 1564)
