= 1640 in France =

- Decades: 1620s; 1630s; 1640s; 1650s; 1660s
- See also: History of France; Timeline of French history; List of years in France

Events from the year 1640 in France.

== Incumbents ==
- Monarch – Louis XIII

== Events ==
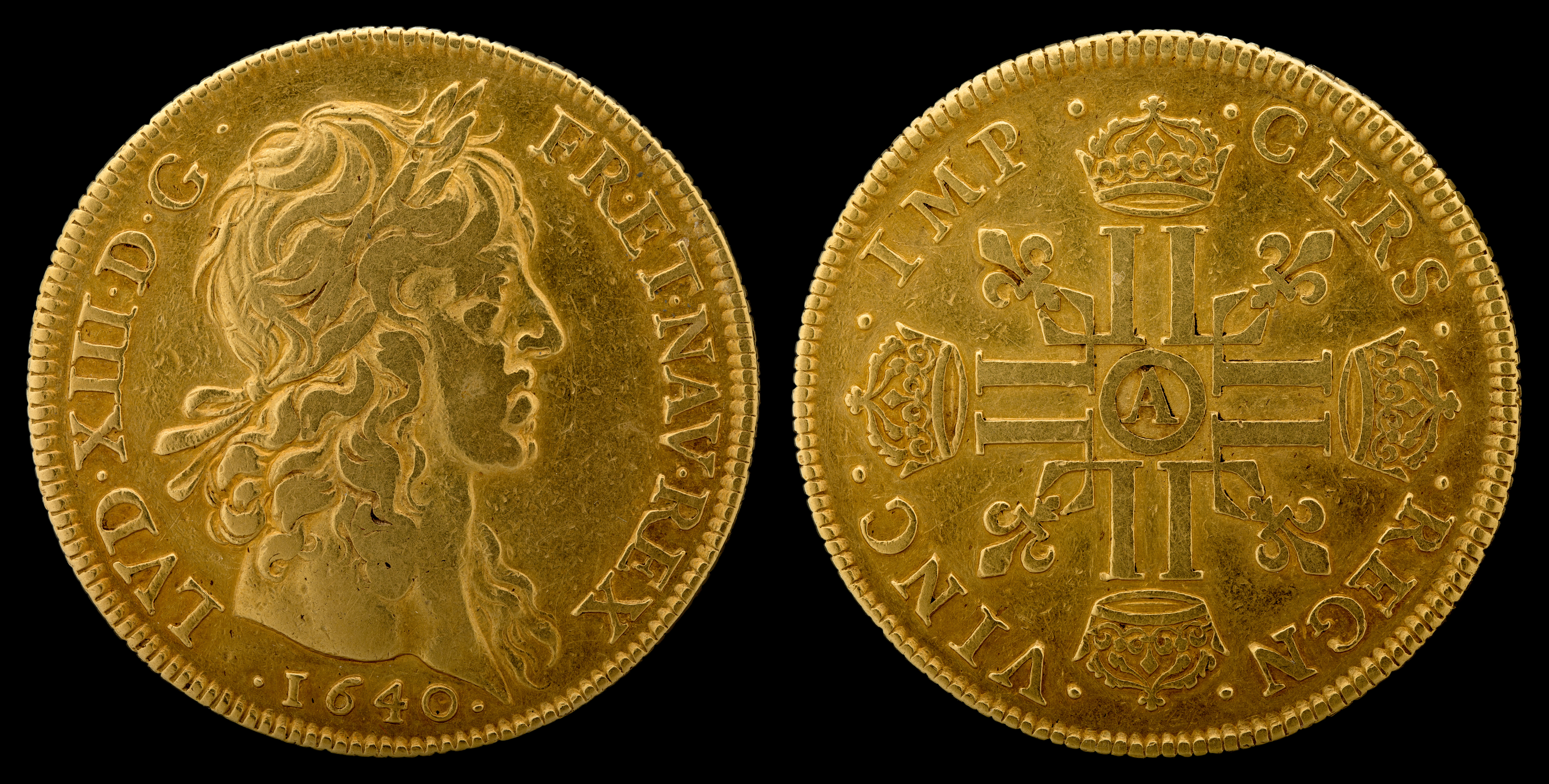
Louis d'or of Louis XIII (1640), first year of issue.

- Introduction of the Louis d'or
- The Battle of Cádiz

== Births ==
- 9 March – Jacques d'Agar, portrait painter (died 1715)

=== Full date missing ===
- Étienne Chauvin, Protestant divine (died 1725)
- Marguerite de la Sablière, salonist and polymath (died 1693)

== Deaths ==
- 30 May – André Duchesne, historian and geographer (born 1584)

=== Full date missing ===
- Claude de Bullion, aristocrat and politician (born 1569)
- John Francis Regis, priest (born 1597)
- Isaac Manasses de Pas, Marquis de Feuquieres, soldier (born 1590)

== Links ==
Media related to 1640 in France at Wikimedia Commons
