= 1641 in France =

- Decades: 1620s; 1630s; 1640s; 1650s; 1660s
- See also: History of France; Timeline of French history; List of years in France

Events from the year 1641 in France.

== Incumbents ==
- Monarch: Louis XIII

== Events ==
- 18 January – The Junta de Braços (council of Estates) of the Principality of Catalonia, led by Pau Claris, accepts the proposal to establish the Catalan Republic under French protection.
- 1 June – Representatives of France and Portugal sign a treaty of alliance in Paris.
- 29 June – The Battle of Wolfenbüttel takes place between a combined Swedish and French force against the Holy Roman Empire, with the Swedish-French army driving back an Imperial assault.
- 14 September – The Treaty of Péronne is signed between Honoré II, Prince of Monaco and King Louis XIII of France, guaranteeing the Grimaldi family the right to rule Monaco in return for the principality becoming a French protectorate.
- 18 September – The siege of Bapaume ends with the surrender of the fortress by its Spanish occupiers.
- René Descartes' Meditations on First Philosophy is originally published.

== Births ==
- 18 January – François-Michel le Tellier, Marquis de Louvois, war minister (d. 1691)
- 2 February – Claude de la Colombière, Jesuit priest and saint (d. 1682)
- 17 May – Pierre Monier, painter (d. 1703)
- 15 June – Bernard de la Monnoye, lawyer and writer (d. 1728)
- 28 June – Marie Casimire Louise de La Grange d'Arquien, queen consort of Poland (d. 1716)
- 29 June – Pierre Cholonec, Jesuit missionary and biographer in New France (d. 1723)
- 1 September – Jean Barbier d'Aucour, lawyer and satirist (d. 1694)
- 5 October – Madame de Montespan (Françoise-Athénaïs de Rochechouart de Mortemart), mistress of Louis XIV (d. 1707)
- 17 November – André, marquis de Nesmond, naval commander (d. 1702)
- 7 December – Louis, Count of Armagnac, noble (d. 1718)
- Pierre Allix, Protestant clergyman (d. 1717)

== Deaths ==
- 23 March – Claude Bernard, priest (b. 1588)
- 6 July – Louis, Count of Soissons (b. 1604)
- 26 August – Jean-Jacques Bouchard, writer (b. 1606)
- 31 August – Guy de La Brosse, physician and botanist (b. 1586)
- 3 October – Étienne Martellange, architect (b. 1569)
- 22 December – Maximilien de Béthune, Duke of Sully, 2nd Prime Minister of France (b. 1560)
