= 1643 in France =

- Decades: 1620s; 1630s; 1640s; 1650s; 1660s
- See also: History of France; Timeline of French history; List of years in France

Events from the year 1643 in France.

== Incumbents ==
- Monarch – Louis XIII (until 14 May); then Louis XIV
- Regent: Anne of Austria (from 14 May)

== Events ==
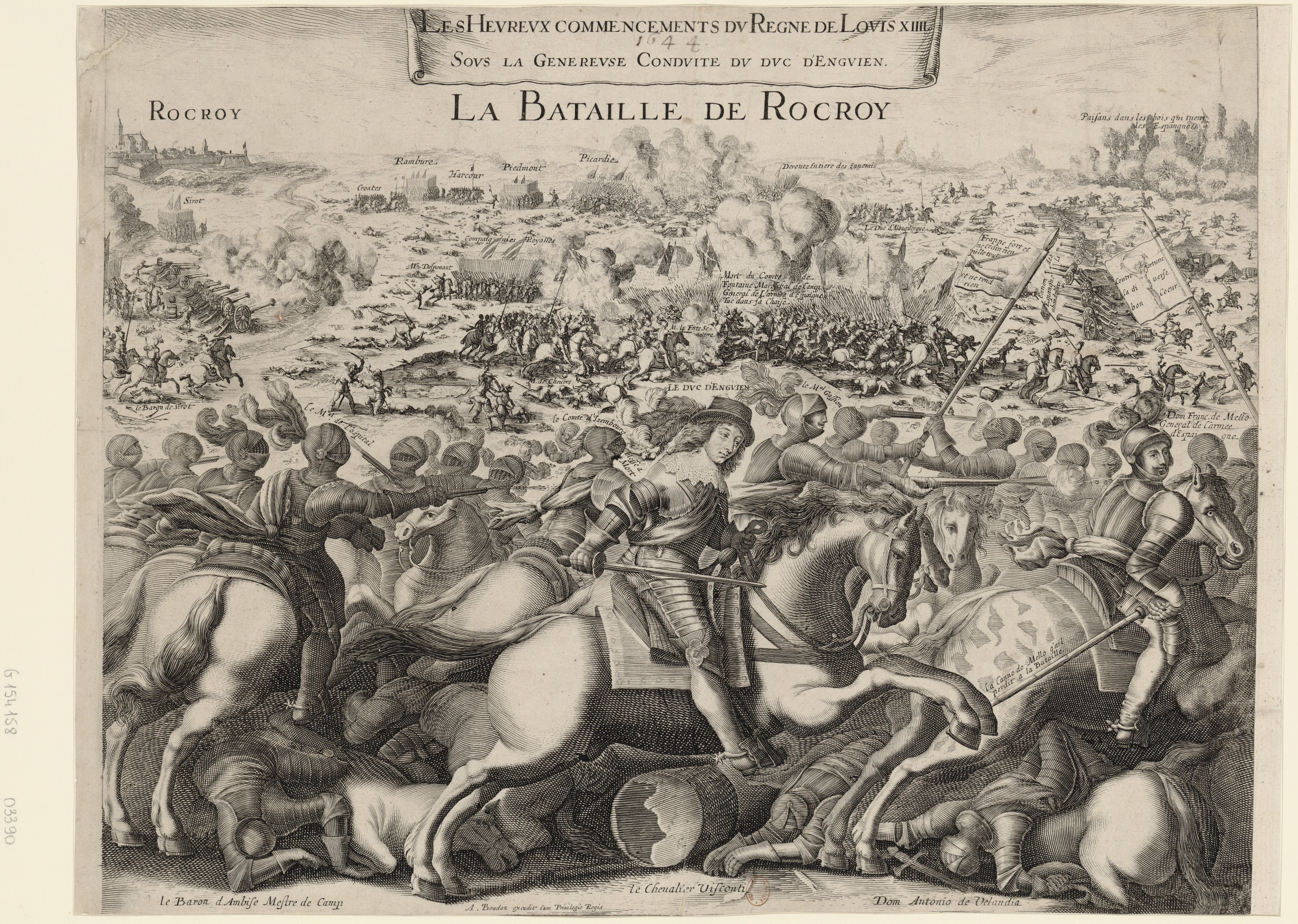
French general Louis de Bourbon, Prince of Condé at the Battle of Rocroi, 1643

- 14 May – Louis XIII dies, and Louis XIV becomes King of France.
- 19 May – Battle of Rocroi

== Births ==
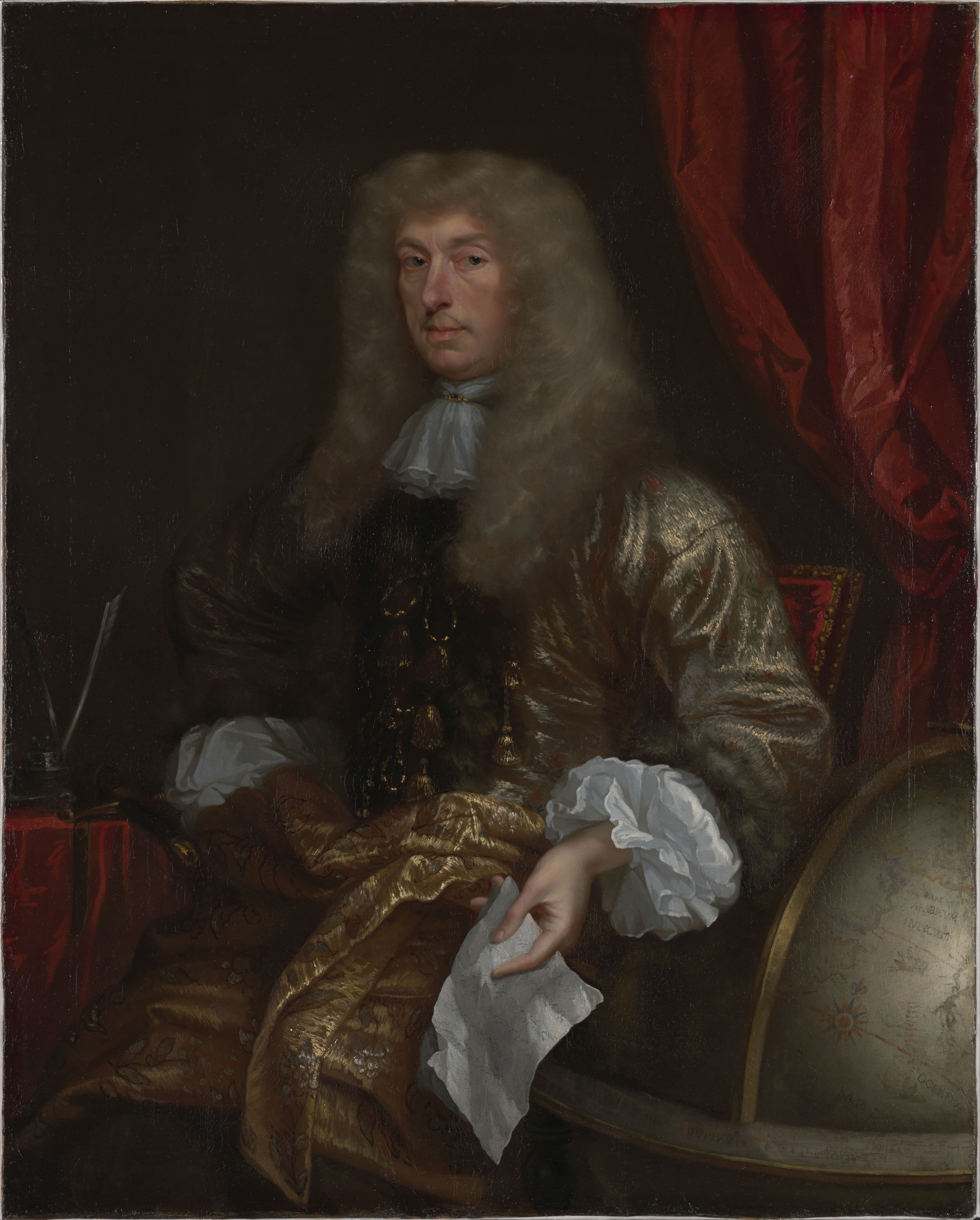
Jean Chardin

=== Full date missing ===
- Jean Chapelain, traveler (died 1713)
- Louis Moréri, priest and encyclopedist (died 1680)
- Henri Jules, Prince of Condé (died 1709)

== Deaths ==
- 14 May – Louis XIII (born 1601)

=== Full date missing ===
- Pierre Hérigone, mathematician and astronomer (born 1580)
- Jean du Vergier de Hauranne, Catholic priest (born 1581)
- Henri Spondanus, jurist and historian (born 1568)
- Étienne de la Croix, Jesuit missionary and writer (born 1579)
