= Jean-Baptiste Chardon =

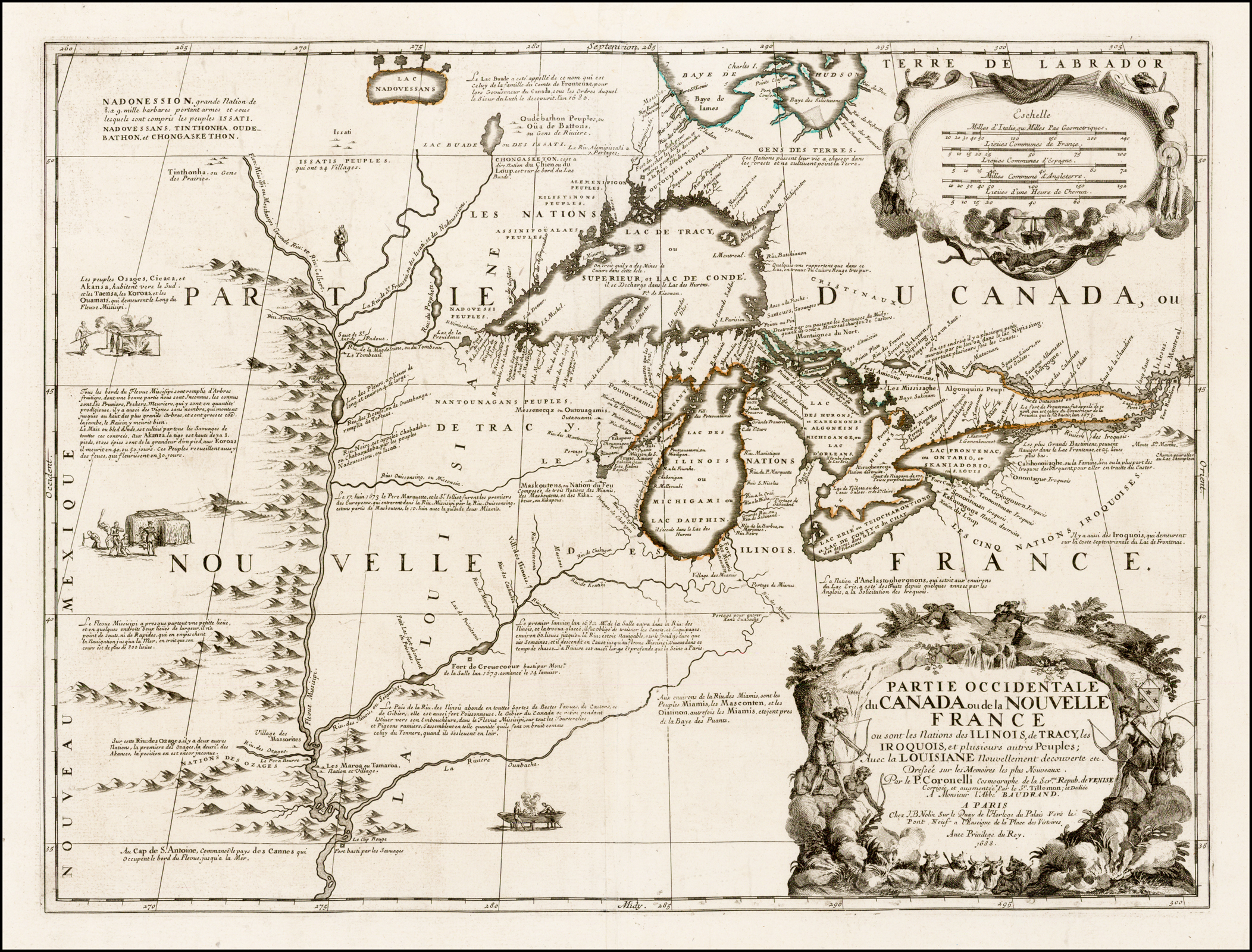
Maps of 1688 by Vincenzo Coronelli representing the Great Lakes region under the New France administration

Jean-Baptiste Chardon (April 27, 1672 (some sources say April 27, 1671) in Bordeaux, Gascony, France – April 11, 1743 in Quebec City) was a French Jesuit missionary to the Indians in Canada and in Louisiana territory.

Chardon entered the noviciate in the Society of Jesus at Bordeaux on September 7, 1687. He studied at Pau in 1689 and 1690 and taught at the Jesuit college in La Rochelle from 1690 to 1695. He completed his studies at Poitiers in 1695 to 1699.

He arrived in New France (Canada) in summer 1699 and learned amerindian languages until the end of that year. In 1700 he traveled to the Saguenay country. He soon was named missionary to the Ottawa.

In the following year he joined the western mission headquartered at Mackinac, although he traveled widely. He visited the Foxes, Menominees, Mascoutens, Kickapoos, Ottawas, Potawatomis, and Miamis. In September 1701 he went to Green Bay (Baie-des-Puants) to aid The Venerable Henri Nouvel, who had been nearly forty years on the mission there and was nearly 80 years of age.

In 1711 he was evangelizing the Miamis on the St. Joseph River, temporarily replacing Father Claude Aveneau, who was ill. In 1722 he replaced Father Pierre-Gabriel Marest as superior at Mackinac. According to Marest, he was a missionary full of zeal, with a rare talent for learning languages. He mastered nearly all the languages of the Indians he came in contact with.

Chardon was the only priest on the old mission ground west of Lake Michigan for several years. He remained at Green Bay until 1728, when it was burned by Constant Le Marchand de Lignery on his return from his expedition against the Foxes. In 1733 Chardon was back at Montreal, and from 1735 to 1743 was listed as "aged and infirm" at Quebec. Bishop Henri-Marie Dubreil de Pontbriand held him in high esteem, asking for Chardon's blessing on the latter's deathbed.
