= 1644 in France =

- Decades: 1620s; 1630s; 1640s; 1650s; 1660s
- See also: History of France; Timeline of French history; List of years in France

Events from the year 1644 in France.

== Incumbents ==
- Monarch: Louis XIV
- Regent: Anne of Austria

== Births ==
- March 1 – Simon Foucher, French polemic (d. 1696)
- April 7 – François de Neufville, duc de Villeroy, French soldier (d. 1730)
- August 6 – Louise de La Vallière, French mistress of Louis XIV (d. 1710)
- September 22 – Jacques Échard, French bibliographer (d. 1724)
- October 1 – Jean Rousseau (violist), French musician (d. 1699)
- October 1 – Alessandro Stradella, Italian composer (d. 1682)
- October 2 – François-Timoléon de Choisy, French author (d. 1724)
