= 1645 in France =

- Decades: 1620s; 1630s; 1640s; 1650s; 1660s
- See also: History of France; Timeline of French history; List of years in France

Events from the year 1645 in France.

== Incumbents ==
- Monarch – Louis XIV
- Regent: Anne of Austria

== Events ==
- Charenton established
- Francois Morneau married Marie Mornet - 1645

== Births ==
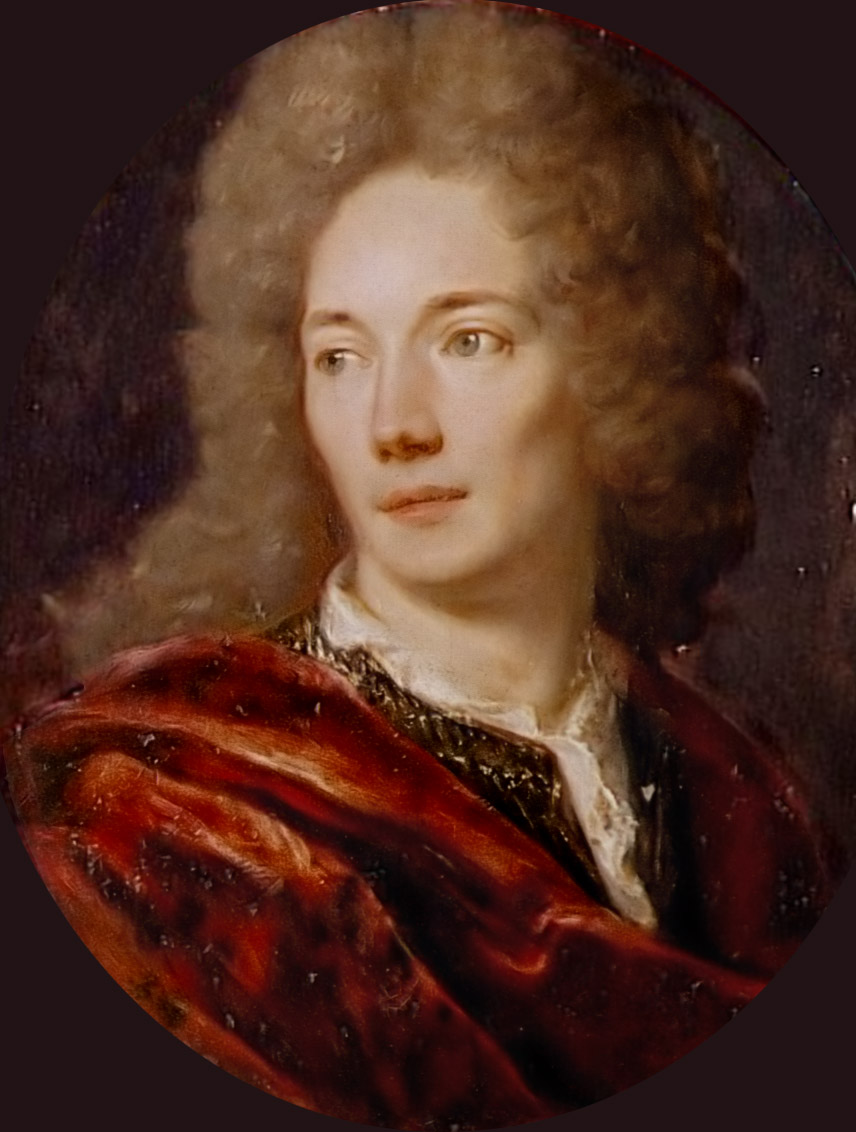
Jean de La Bruyère

- 16 August – Jean de La Bruyère, writer (died 1696)
- 663 Marie Bernard (died 1718)

=== Full date missing ===
- François Vachon de Belmont (died 1732)
- François de Troy, painter and engraver (died 1730)
- Jean-Baptiste Théodon, sculptor (died 1713)
- Robert Clicquot, organ builder (died 1719)
- Charles Louis Simonneau, engraver (died 1728)
- Daniel Montbars, buccaneer (died 1707?)

== Deaths ==
=== Full date missing ===
- Jacques Linard, painter (born 1597)
- François de La Rochefoucauld, cardinal (born 1558)
