= Jacques-Philippe Cornut =

French physician and botanist (1606–1651)

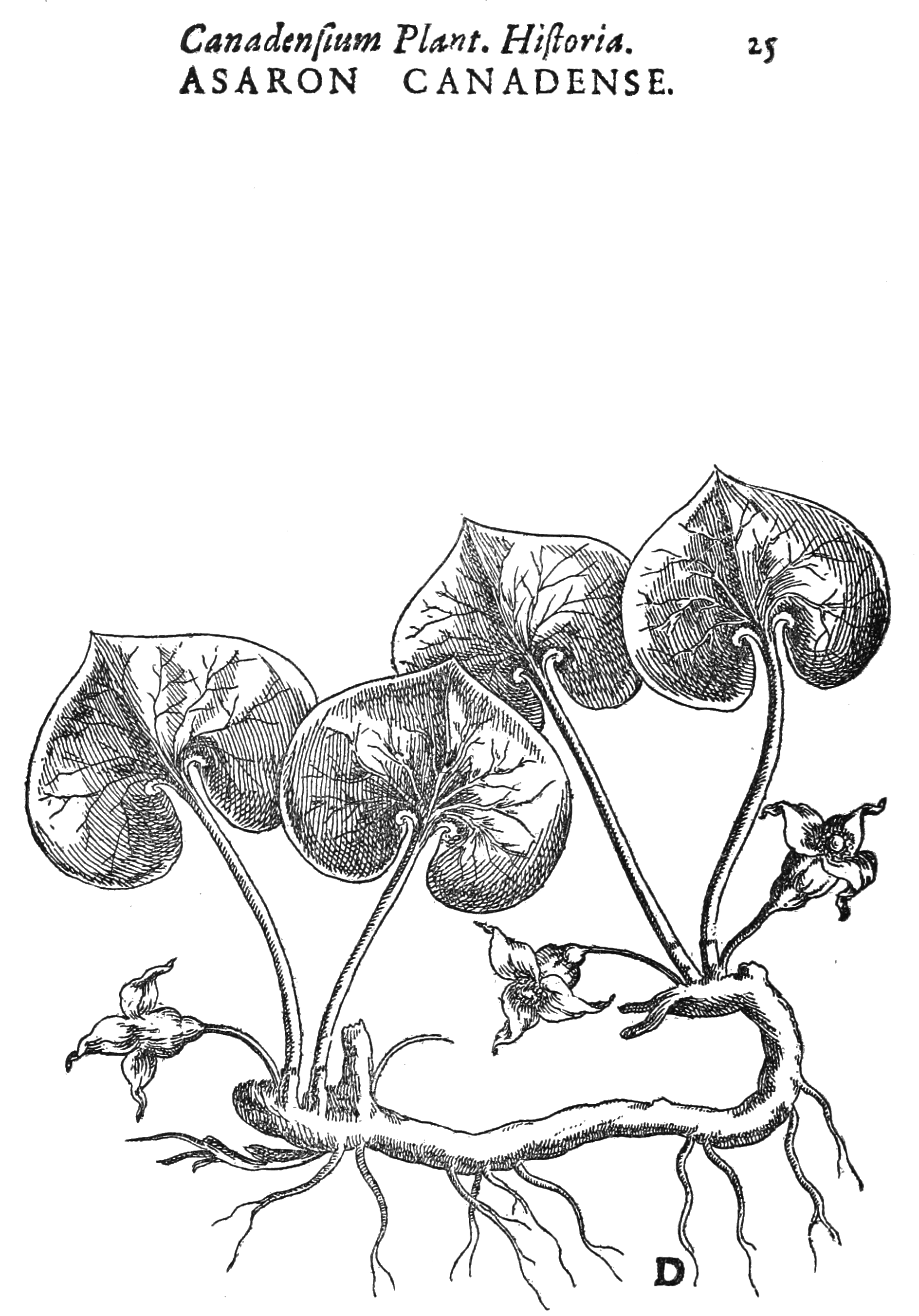
Asarum canadense

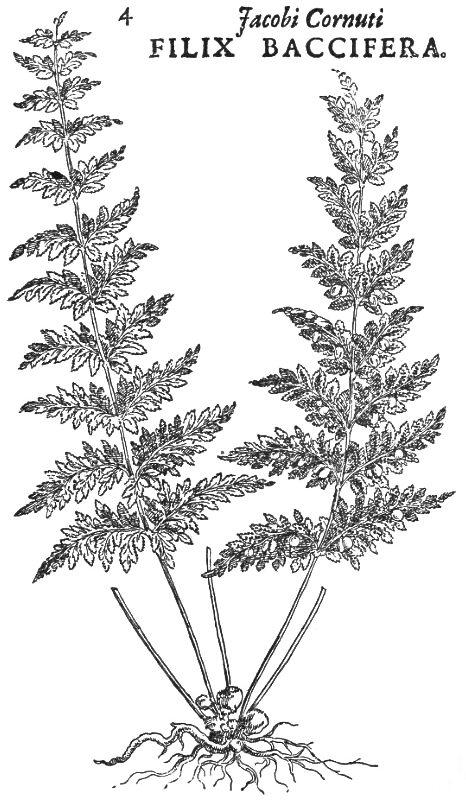
Cystopteris bulbifera

Jacques-Philippe Cornut or Jacques-Philippe Cornuti or Jacobus Cornutus (19 October 1606 Paris – 23 August 1651) was a French physician and botanist.

He was the author of Enchiridion botanicum parisiense (Botanical Manual of Paris), a study of the flora local to Paris, and Canadensivm plantarvm, aliarúmque nondum editarum historia. Cui adiectum ad calcem Enchiridion botanicvm parisiense, continens indicem plantarum, quae in pagis, siluis, pratis, et montosis iuxta Parisios locis nascuntur (Canadian plants, and other unpublished material. To which is appended to the end the Botanical Manual of Paris, listing the plants that are native to the villages, the woods, the meadows, and mountains). (Note: Canada at that time was considered as stretching from the Saint Lawrence River to Louisiana.) Over the course of his career he described 541 species. The plates of the Canadian flora have been attributed to Pierre Valet (1575–1650).

Despite having compiled these Canadian flora, Cornut never visited the New World, but received most of his plant specimens from Vespasien Robin and his father, Jean, who tended the gardens of Henry IV of France and that of the Paris Faculty of Medicine, and the Morin family, who owned a number of commercial nurseries in Paris.

Cornut described and illustrated more than thirty new species from eastern North America. Also included were five South African bulbous plants, illustrated for the first time. Linnaeus cited Cornut's work several times in his Species Plantarum. Charles Plumier named the genus Cornutia in the family Lamiaceae in his honour.
