= Pierre Lalouette =

French physician

Pierre Lalouette de Vernicourt (1711 - 1792) was a French anatomist.

Lalouette described a lobe present in around a third of the population's thyroids that would later be called the Lalouette's Pyramid. When asked about a possible function for the thyroid gland, Lalouette said that it "would intervene to modulate voice expression by the liquid it produces."

== Bibliography ==
- Nouvelle méthode de traiter les maladies vénériennes par la fumigation, avec les procès-verbaux des guérisons opérées par ce moyen in 1776 (translated in English in 1777).
- Traité des scrophules, vulgairement appelées écrouelles ou humeurs froides, 3e partie, contenant l'examen analytique des nouveaux procédés qui composent le remède anti-scrophuleux, suivie de deux dissertations médico-chimiques, dont la 1re contient le procédé pour dissoudre le plomb dans les corps vivants par le moyen du mercure coulant et animé la seconde... expose les dangers presqu'inévitables des étamages in 1782.
