= Nicolas Ysambert =

French Roman Catholic theologian and teacher

Nicolas Ysambert (1565 or 1569—May 14, 1642) was a French, Roman Catholic theologian, and lifelong teacher at the Sorbonne.

== Life ==
Born at Orléans, Ysambert studied theology at the Sorbonne and was made a fellow (socius) of the college in 1598. Thenceforth he professed theology with such success as to attract public attention.

In 1616, King Louis XIII created a new chair of theology at the Sorbonne for the study of the controversial questions between Catholics and Protestants. Louis appointed Ysambert to this chair, praising him effusively in the letter appointing him.

Throughout his teaching career, Ysambert drew heavily on the Summa Theologica of Thomas Aquinas. He became well known as a teacher.

In the councils of the theological faculty he was chiefly distinguished for his share in the censure directed against Marc Antonio de Dominis, the apostate Archbishop of Spalatro, and author of De republica christiana, against ecclesiastical hierarchy; he was the first to argue that the doctrine was heretical to the faculty and he brought about its condemnation. When Edmond Richer laboured to revive in the theological faculty a somewhat modified Gallicanism, Ysambert, alongside the theologian Duval were active and zealous defenders of the rights of the Holy See.

He died at Paris.

== Works ==
He began publishing his Disputationes, or commentaries on the Summa Theologica of Thomas Aquinas, but it was not completed during his life (Paris, 1638–48).

Attribution
