= François de Cauvigny de Colomby =

French poet, translator and conseiller du roi

François de Cauvigny, sieur de Colomby (Caen, c. 1588 – 1648) was a French poet, translator, conseiller du roi and "orateur du roi pour les discours d'État".

== Biography ==
François de Cauvigny de Colomby was a relative of Malherbe, who taught him to make poems; Hey said to him "that he had a good spirit, but that he did could not write poems". In spite of the mediocrity of his talent, he was welcomed at the Hotel de Rambouillet and succeeded in court, where he had himself created the job of "speaker of the king for state speeches", a job that did not exist before him and was removed at his death. This sinecure brought him twelve hundred crowns of pension. At the end of his career, he took the ecclesiastical habit, without becoming a priest, renouncing the world and no longer appearing at the assemblies of the French Academy, of which he was one of the first members.

"He was tall, and very powerful," writes Paul Pellisson, in an ambitious mood, and concerted in all his actions. There are various pieces of it, including a Speech of Consolation, published in the collections of time. His main title is a poem about The Complaints of Captive Caliston to the invincible Aristarchus, written with ease and not without enthusiasm. In prose, his translation of the History of Justin was long considered before falling into oblivion.

== Works ==
- Les Plaintes de la captive Caliston à l'invincible Aristarque (1605) - his main work.
- Discours presenté au Roy avant son partement pour aller assieger Sedan (1606)
- Actions de grâces à Dieu pour les mariages du Roy et de Madame, et pour tous les heureux succès de la régence de la Reine (1612)
- Observations politiques, topographiques et historiques sur Tacite, ensemble la traduction de quelque partie du premier livre des Annales du même auteur (1613) Online text
- Réfutation de l'astrologie judiciaire (1614)
- L'Histoire universelle de Trogue Pompée, réduite en abrégé par Justin et traduite en françois par le sieur de Collomby-Cauvigny (1616) - a prose work, long esteemed before falling into disuse.
- Lettre à monseigneur le chancelier, par messire François de Cauvigny, seigneur de Coulomby, conseiller du roi (1624)
- De l'autorité des roys : premier discours (1631)
- Discours panégyrique au roi, par messire François de Cauvigny, seigneur de Coulomby, conseiller du roi en ses conseils, et son orateur pour les discours d'État (1631)
