= Gillet de La Tessonerie =

French playwright

Gillet de La Tessonerie (c. 1620 – c. 1660) was a French playwright. Little of his life is known, though he is known to have been a member of the council of the Cour des Monnaies in 1642 and to have written nine plays between 1640 and 1657.

== Selected works ==
- L'Art de Régner (The Art of Reigning) (1645) - a tragi-comedy, each of whose five acts forms a separate playlet
