= Claude Aveneau =

Claude Aveneau (December 25, 1650 – September 14, 1711) was a Jesuit missionary in New France.

== Background ==
Aveneau was born in Laval, France, and entered the novitiate in Paris in 1669. In 1671 he began teaching at the Jesuit college in Arras. After seven years at Arras, he studied philosophy for a year at the Collège Louis-le-Grand in Paris and then studied theology for four years at Bourges. He was ordained a priest there in 1683. In 1685, after three years at Rouen, he left for Canada.

== Missionary work ==
His first assignment was to the mission at Sillery. In 1686 he was assigned to the mission to Ottawas of the Great Lakes. The Jesuits had just opened a mission to the Miamis, who had taken refuge at the mission of Saint-Joseph, near the site of present-day Niles, Michigan, on land granted by Governor Jacques Denonville in 1686. There from 1689 on Father Aveneau spent the better part of his life. Fort St. Joseph was established nearby in 1697. Aveneau pursued his mission alone until an assistant, Father Jean Mermet, was sent to him about 1699.

== Dispute with Cadillac ==
In 1702 Aveneau incurred the displeasure of Cadillac, the French commandant at Detroit. Cadillac had received approval to found a post at Detroit which would be larger than the one at Montreal, and where whites and Indians of the various tribes of the region would live in harmony. It was first necessary to attract the Indians to the post, but for the most part the Indians did not feel drawn towards Detroit. Moreover, the missionaries did not support the project, considering the assimilation of the Indians, their living together with the whites, and the brandy trade to be disastrous for evangelization. Cadillac blamed the failure of his plan on the missionaries.

The only documents extant on the matter are by Cadillac, and he was not always trustworthy. We know that Cadillac blamed Aveneau for the slow pace at which the Miamis of the St. Joseph River moved to Detroit. Cadillac removed Aveneau from his post, replacing him by a Recollet who did not speak the language and did not have the confidence of the Indian converts. (There is some question whether the Recollect ever took up his position.) Disturbances by the Miamis and opposition to the French were the result.

== Afterwards ==
In the summer of 1702, Mermet left to go as chaplain at the post which Louis Juchereau de St. Denis was trying to build on the Ohio River near the present-day city of Cairo, Illinois. He seems never to have returned to the St. Joseph mission. Mermet's successor as Aveneau's assistant was Father Jean-Baptiste Chardon, who arrived there in 1705 and succeeded Father Aveneau in 1711.

In 1708 Governor Philippe de Rigaud Vaudreuil and Intendant Jacques Raudot reported what they considered Cadillac's misuse of authority to the home government. Aveneau returned to the mission, and order was restored.

In 1711, being very ill, Aveneau retired to Quebec. A 500-km canoe trip by a man who was already exhausted was an unfortunate necessity. He died at Quebec on September 14, 1711. Father Joseph Germain, superior general of the Canadian missions, wrote an account of his life in which he praised his patience, his courage, and his charity towards friend and foe alike.

Point Abino, Ontario, halfway between Fort Erie and Port Colborne, is named for him.

== Bibliography ==
- (in French) J.B.A. Ferland, Cours d'Historie du Canada (Quebec, 1865), II, 336.
- George Paré, The Catholic Church in Detroit, 1701–1888 (Detroit, 1951), 78–140.
- (in French) J.S. Camille de Rochemonteix, Les Jésuites et la Nouvelle-France au XVIIe siècle (Paris 1895-96), III, 477, 512ff.
- (in French) J.S. Camille de Rochemonteix, Les Jésuites et la Nouvelle-France au XVIIIe siècle (Paris, 1906), I, 65ff.
