= Trottier =

Trottier is a family name in France, Canada and the United States. It is one of the most common family names in the province of Québec (Canada). A Trottier family came from France to Canada in 1646. A family from Quebec then migrated to San Francisco in the 1910s.

== The first Trottiers in Québec ==
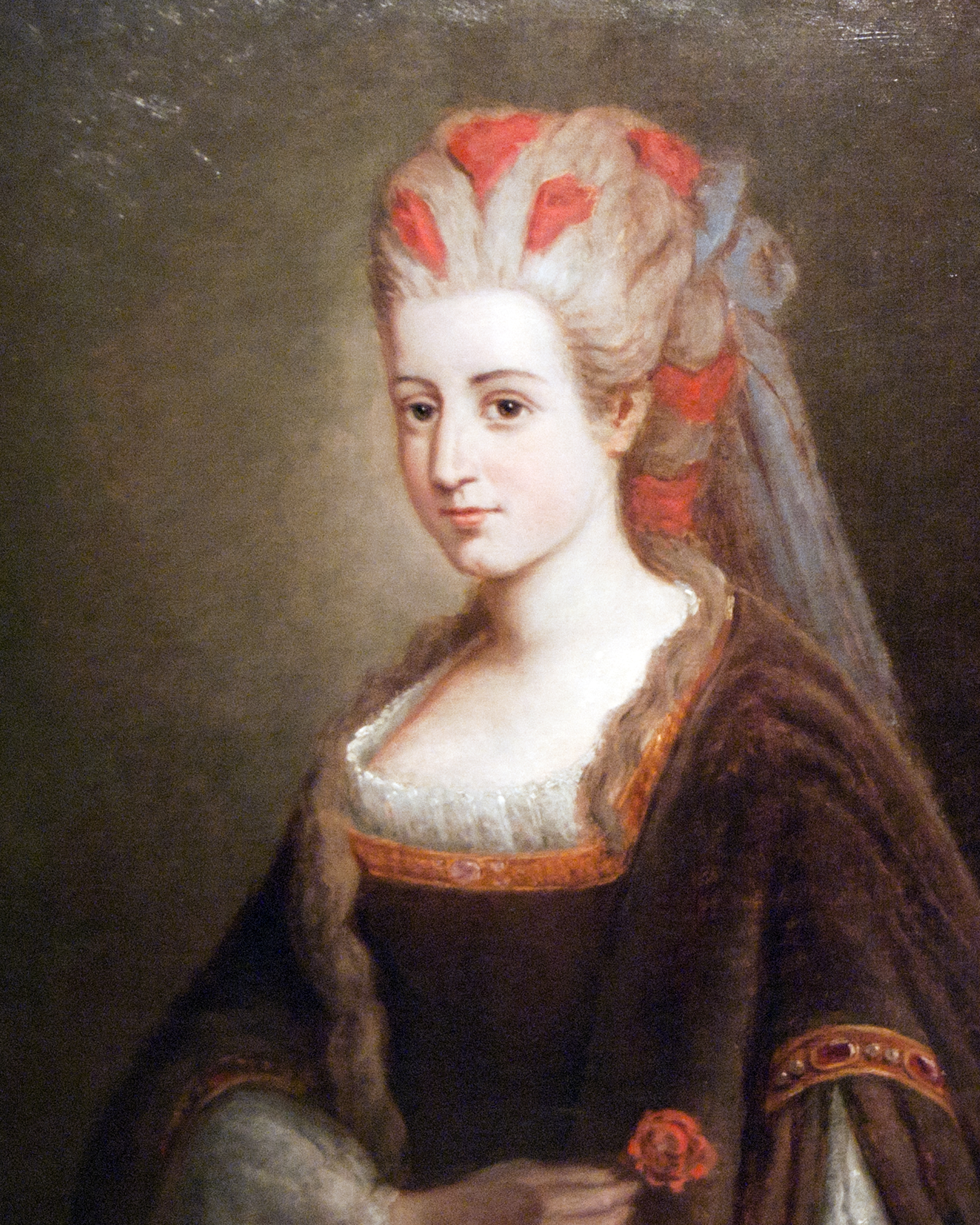
Charlotte Trottier dite Desrivières

The Trottiers were among the first French settlers in New France. Born to Jules Trottier I of Mortagne-au-Perche, Orne, Lower Normandy, France; Jules (Gilles) Trottier II, born around 1591 in Igé (Orne, Normandy, France), dispatched to New France by contract at La Rochelle on July 4, 1646. Aboard the ship, "The Cardinal", The Trottier Family arrived in Quebec, Canada on September 23, 1646. A plaque was erected at St. Martin's Parish in France to commemorate he and the other men that left the town to settle in North America. Jules worked as a carpenter and labourer. He settled in New France with his wife, Catherine Loiseau, and their children:

- Julien, baptised in Igé on March 30, 1636
- Gilles (also known as Antoine), baptised in Igé on January 21, 1640, died December 5, 1706
- Pierre Trottier (13 January 1644 - 8 January 1693)
- Jean-Baptiste, born at sea during the trip from France to Quebec in July 1646.

Antoine's granddaughter, Marie-Charlotte Trottier dite Desrivières, was a witness at the trial of Marie-Joseph Angélique, who was executed for setting a fire that burned much of Old Montreal, in 1734. Charlotte was later wed to Jean-Baptiste Testard, son of Jacques Testard de Montigny. Like their father, sons Jean-Baptiste-Jérémie (1741 - 1799) and Jean-Baptiste-Pierre (1750- 1813) were famed soldiers; they fought at the Battle of the Cedars, in 1776, where the elder brother "distinguished himself by formulating a strategy against the invaders and capturing Major Henry Sherburne".

== Famous Trottier descendants ==
- Bryan Trottier (born 1956), Canadian hockey player
- Dave Trottier (1906–1956), Canadian hockey player
- Denis Trottier (elected MNA in 2007), Canadian politician
- Dominique Trottier (born 1976), Canadian TV reporter
- Guy Trottier (1941–2014), Canadian hockey player
- Justin Trottier (born 1982), Canadian political activist and charity executive director
- Lorne Trottier (born 1948), Canadian businessman, founder of the firm Matrox
- Pierre Trottier (1925–2010), Canadian writer
- Rocky Trottier (born 1964), Canadian hockey player

== Others ==
- Trottier middle school
