= Jean-François Lalouette =

French composer (1651–1728)

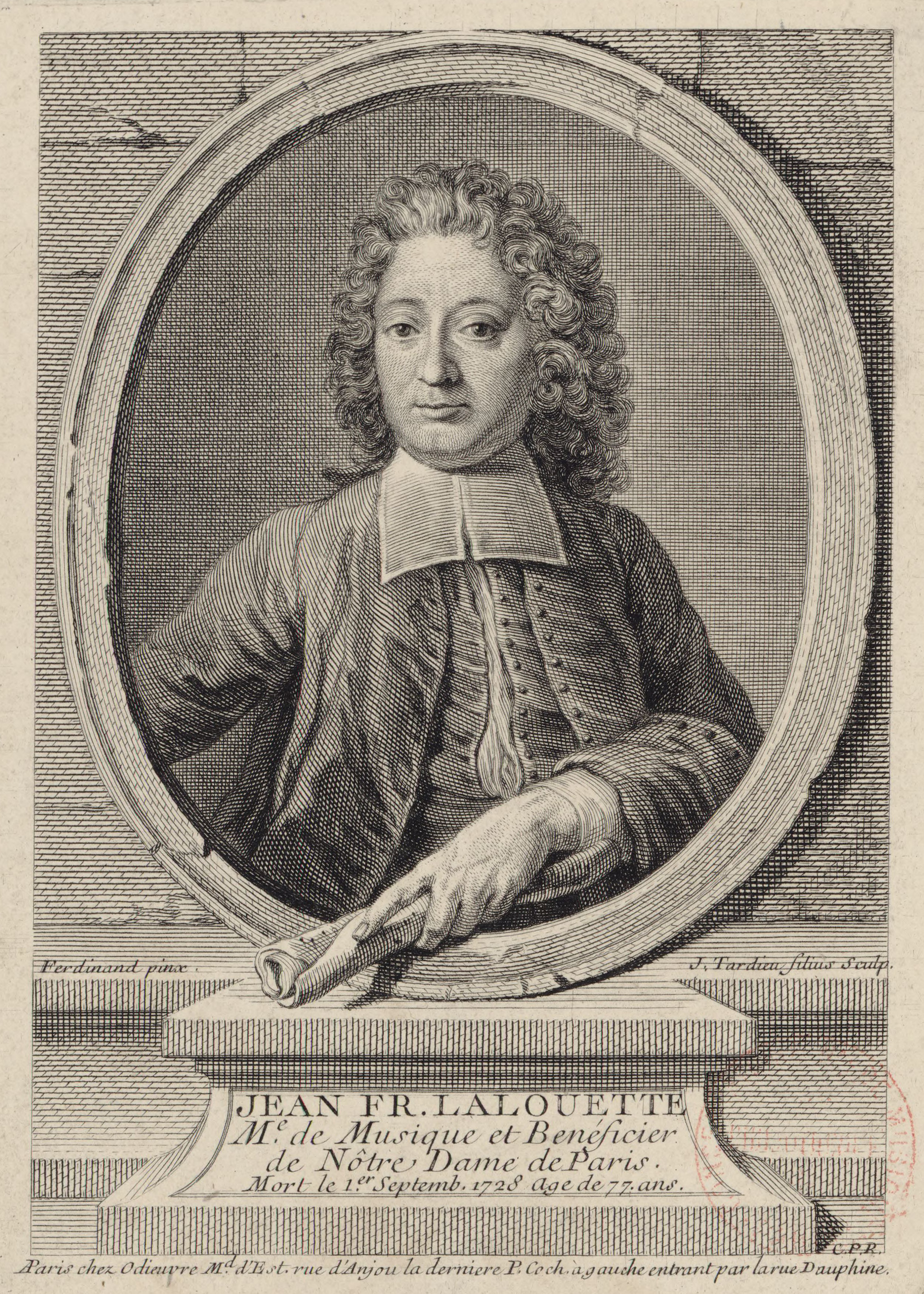
Jean-François Lalouette

Jean-François Lalouette (1651–1728) was a French composer of the Baroque period (ca. 1600–1750).

== Early life ==
Lalouette (also spelled "Lallouette") had his first musical education in the school choir of St. Eustache in Paris. He studied violin with Guy Leclerc and composition with Jean-Baptiste de Lully. Lalouette was appointed as Lully's assistant. It is known that Lalouette was asked by Lully to complete the internal parts of some of the latter's works. But, after having been heard claiming credit for writing the better part of Lully's opera, Isis (1677), not surprisingly he was fired by Lully from his job as assistant.

== Between Italy and France ==
In April 1678, he appeared at the Court of Savoy in Turin, where he was appointed as “French composer of music” and placed to guide the group of violinists in the orchestra. But, by July 1679 he was fired again. He returned to Paris. During that time, he apparently wrote an opera, since there is a letter from a royal official in 1681 forbidding any further performance of his work on the grounds that it violated the privilege conferred by King Louis XIV of France on Lully.

News of activities for the period 1683 to 1693 is rather sparse. In April 1683, Lalouette was refused the possibility of competing for one of the four posts of sous-maître of the chapelle royale. Apparently, he was able to self-finance a stay at Rome in 1689, where he composed a concerto in the Italian style that had at least one performance. Around 1692, he can be located in the environs of St. Germain-l’Auxerrois, Paris.

== Choirmaster and Priest ==
In December 1693, he was appointed Choirmaster of the cathedral of Rouen, and remained there until February 1695. For the period 1695 to 1700, there are conflicting reports. All that can be said with certainty is that, in November 1700, Lalouette was appointed to succeed André Campra as choirmaster of the cathedral, Notre Dame of Paris. In 1716, he asked to be relieved from the arduous task. His resignation was accepted; and, he became a canon next door at the fr:Église Saint-Jean-le-Rond de Paris, a small baptistery on Notre-Dame's north flank (demolished in 1751). Nevertheless, at the beginning of 1718 Lalouette requested to be re-instated in his position as Choirmaster in the main cathedral since he regretted the poor quality of the performances of his music.

== Retirement and death ==
His final resignation from all work came in January 1727. He was granted an annual pension of 400 livres.

After his death, the canons of the church to which he belonged agreed to donate his entire body of music for preservation in the archives.

== Works ==
- Motets (Paris, 1726)
- Psalm, Miserere for Grand Choir & Hymn, Veni Creator for 3 voices (Paris, 1730)
- Missa Veritas (Parigi, 1744)
- Mass in Plain Chant
- Motet, O Cibum super Omnia (also attributed to Lully)
- 6 Motets (attributed to Sébastien de Brossard; also, to Lully)
- Menuet pour le premier dessus

Lost Works: Works during sojourn in Paris, ca. 1678–1680, Concerto (dated, probably 1689?). Serenade, a 3, 1678. Ballets airs, musiche di scena
