= Bart (surname) =

Bart is a surname, and may refer to:

- Adrien Bart (born 1991), French canoeist
- André Schwarz-Bart (1928–2006), French writer
- Andrzej Bart (born 1951), Polish novelist, screenwriter and film director
- Bram Bart (1962–2012), Dutch voice actor
- Cécile Bart (born 1958), French visual artist
- Cheryl Bart, Australian lawyer and company director
- Chris Bart, Canadian academic
- Chris Bart-Williams (1974–2023), English footballer and coach
- François Cornil Bart (1677–1755), French naval officer
- Frank J. Bart (1883–1961), American soldier, recipient of the Medal of Honor
- Gaston Bart-Williams (1938–1990), Sierra Leonean journalist
- Harm Bart (born 1942), Dutch economist and mathematician
- Harriet Bart (born 1941), American conceptual artist
- Hilary Bart-Smith, Scottish mechanical engineer
- Jacques Schwarz-Bart (born 1962), French jazz saxophonist, son of André and Simone Schwarz-Bart
- Jakub Bart-Ćišinski (1856–1909), Sorbian writer
- Jan Bart (1919–1971), American cantor, Yiddish entertainer and advocate
- Jean Bart (1650–1702), French admiral and privateer
- Jean Bart (writer) (c.1876–1955), American dramatist
- Joey Bart (born 1996), American baseball player
- Lionel Bart (1930–1999), English composer and writer
- Manuel Bart (1886–1962), Chilean politician
- Morris Bart, American attorney
- Nikki Bart, Australian mountain climber and academic
- Patrice Bart (1945–2025), French dancer and choreographer
- Patrice Bart-Williams (born 1979), German reggae singer
- Pauline Bart (1930–2021), American sociologist
- Peter Bart (born 1932), American journalist and film producer
- Philippe-François Bart (1706–1784), French naval officer, grandson of Jean Bart
- Robert Bart (1930–2003), French sprinter
- Roger Bart (born 1962), American actor
- Simone Schwarz-Bart (born 1938), French writer
- Suzanne Bart, American chemist
- William Bart (fl.1380–1386), English Member of Parliament
- Yves Jean-Bart (born 1947), Haitian football executive

== See also ==
- Black Bart (outlaw) (c.1829–1888), American outlaw
- Tony Di Bart (born 1964), English singer
- Barty, surname
- Baert, surname
