= Huyghebaert =

Huyghebaert is a surname. Notable people with the surname include:

- Jan Huyghebaert (born 1945), Belgian businessman
- Jérémy Huyghebaert (born 1989), Belgian footballer
- Lien Huyghebaert (born 1982), Belgian sprinter
- Yogi Huyghebaert (born 1944), Canadian politician

== See also ==
- Huyghe (disambiguation)
- Baert
