= Ponant Fleet =

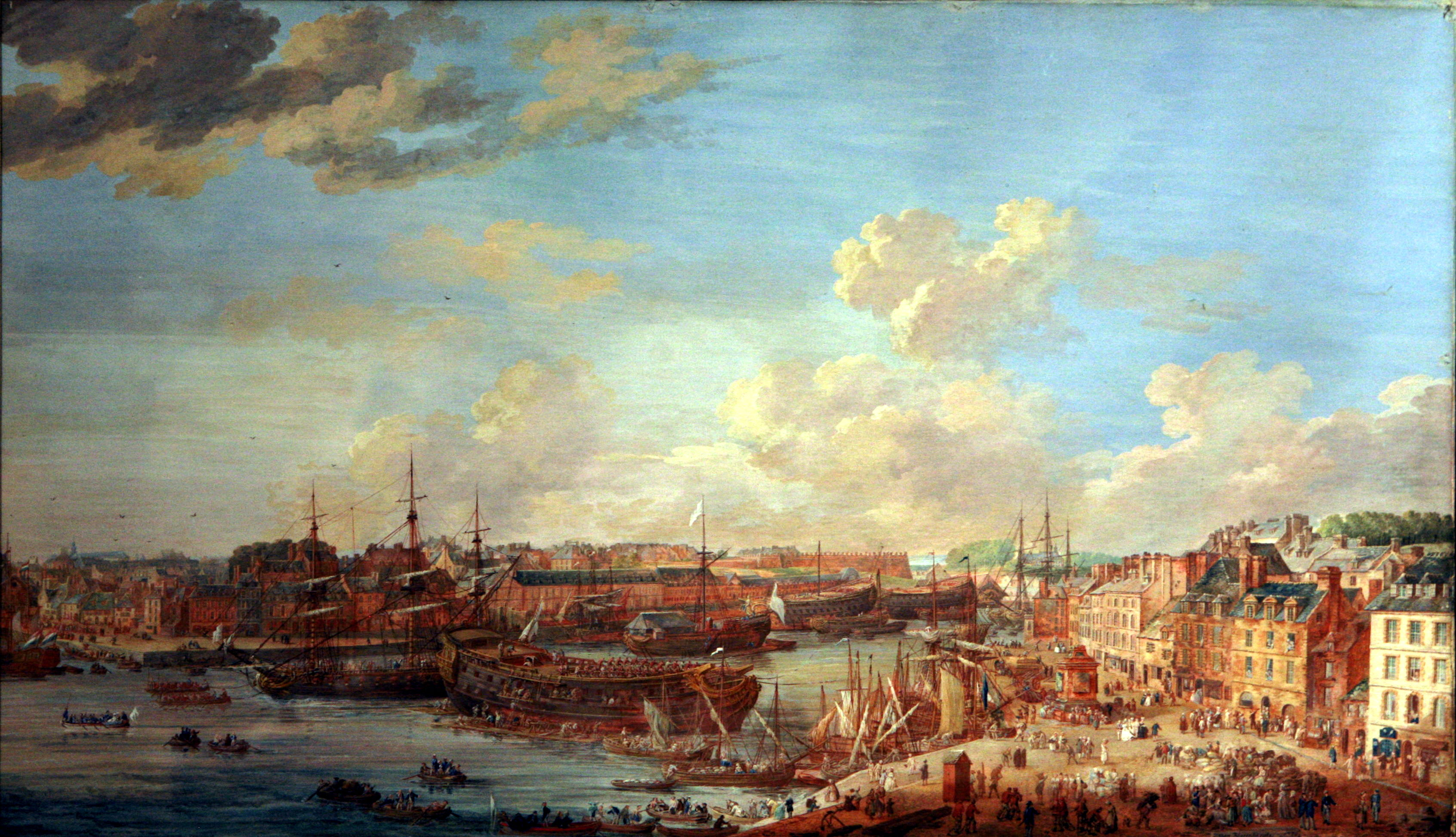
- The Brest Arsenal in 1776; By Louis-Nicolas Van Blarenberghe (1716 – 1794)
- Active: 1669 – 1792
- Country: Kingdom of France
- Branch: Royal French Navy
- Type: Naval fleet
- Role: Naval operations in the English Channel, Atlantic Ocean and Americas
- Garrison/HQ: Arsenal of Brest, Le Havre, Rochefort, Lorient, Cherbourg and Brouage
- Engagements: Franco-Dutch War; Nine Years' War; War of the Spanish Succession; War of the Austrian Succession; Seven Years' War; American War of Independence

The Ponant Fleet (French: Flotte du Ponant) was the designation under the Ancien Regime for the naval vessels of the Royal French Navy in the English Channel, Atlantic Ocean and Americas, the latter principally in the French West Indies and New France. The fleet carried out operations such as asserting naval supremacy and protecting convoys. Its counterpart was the Levant Fleet, based in the Mediterranean Sea.

== Arsenals ==
The Flotte du Ponant was created by Cardinal Richelieu (A former Lieutenant-General of the Kingdom in 1629). The fleet initially had three principal bases: Le Havre, Arsenal of Brest and Hiers-Brouage. Under Louis XIV, the arsenal of Brest was the principal base, supported by the arsenals of Rochefort and Lorient. Under Louis XVI the military port of Cherbourg was developed, with some elements only were recently completed on the outbreak of the French Revolution.

== Flagships ==
The fleet flagship was the most powerful ship at Brest. A number of different ships served in this role during the fleet's existence:

- Soleil Royal, launched in 1669, flagship at the Battle of Beachy Head in 1690, burnt in 1692 following the Battles of Barfleur and La Hogue.
- Soleil Royal, launched in 1692, scuttled at the siege of Toulon in 1707, broken up in 1714.
- Foudroyant, launched in 1724, broken up in 1743.
- Soleil Royal, launched in 1749, burned after the Battle of Quiberon Bay in 1759.
- Royal Louis, launched in 1759, broken up in 1772.
- Bretagne, launched in 1776, flagship at the Battle of Ushant in 1778, renamed the Révolutionnaire, broken up in 1796.
- États de Bourgogne, launched in 1790 as Montagne, then renamed Peuple, then Océan, flagship at the Glorious First of June, the Battle of Groix, the Saint-Domingue expedition and the Battle of the Basque Roads, broken up in 1859.

== Vice-admirals ==
The first commander of what became the Flotte du Ponant was Aymar de Clermont-Chaste-Gessans, who was appointed Vice-admiral of Les Mers du Ponant. The command of the Levant and du Ponant fleets were entrusted on 12 November 1669 to two vice-admirals. The vice-admirals of the du Ponant fleet were:

| Name | Portrait | Tenure | Note |
|---|---|---|---|
| Jean II d'Estrées; Count d'Estrées (1624-1707) | | 1669–1707 | Tenure at age 45 until his death in 1707 |
| Victor-Marie d'Estrées (son of Jean II d'Estrées) (1660-1737) | | 1707-1737 | Tenure at age 46 until 1737 |
| Antoine François de Pardaillan de Gondrin; Marquis d' Antin (1709-1741) | - | (1737-1741) | Tenure at age 28 until 1741 |
| François de Bricqueville; Count de La Luzerne (1665-1746) | - | (1741-1746) | Tenure at age 79 until 1746 |
| Claude-Élisée de Court de La Bruyère (1666-1752) | - | 1750-1752 | Admiral aboard the Terrible in 1744, flying the flag of a Lieutenant-General of the naval forces Vice-Admiral tenure at age 84 in 1750 until 1752 |
| François-Cornil Bart (son of Jean Bart) (1677-1755) | | 1752-1755 | Tenure at age 75 |
| Charles-Félix de Poilvilain; Count de Cresnay (1693-1756) | - | 1755-1756 | Tenure at the age of 62 until 1756 |
| Jean-Baptiste Mac Nemara; Irish descendant (1687-1756) | - | 1756-1756 | Tenure at age 66 and died the second day after his nomination |
| Hubert de Brienne; Count de Brienne (1690-1777) | - | 1756-1777 | Tenure at age 66 until 1777 |
| Joseph de Bauffremont (1714-1781) | | 1777-1781 | Tenure at age 63 until 1781 |
| Paul-Hippolyte de Beauvilliers; Marquis de La Ferté-Saint-Aignan (1712-1788) | - | 1781-1788 | Tenure at age 69 until 1788 |
| Pierre-Antoine de Raymond, bailli d'Éoux | - | 1788-1792 | Tenure at age 82 until 1792 |

Although Jean II d'Estrées commanded the fleet during the battles of the reign of Louis XIV, his successors were too old to have likely served at sea. In practice, the squadrons at sea were under officers with the rank of Lieutenant général des Armées navales.

== Naval administration ==
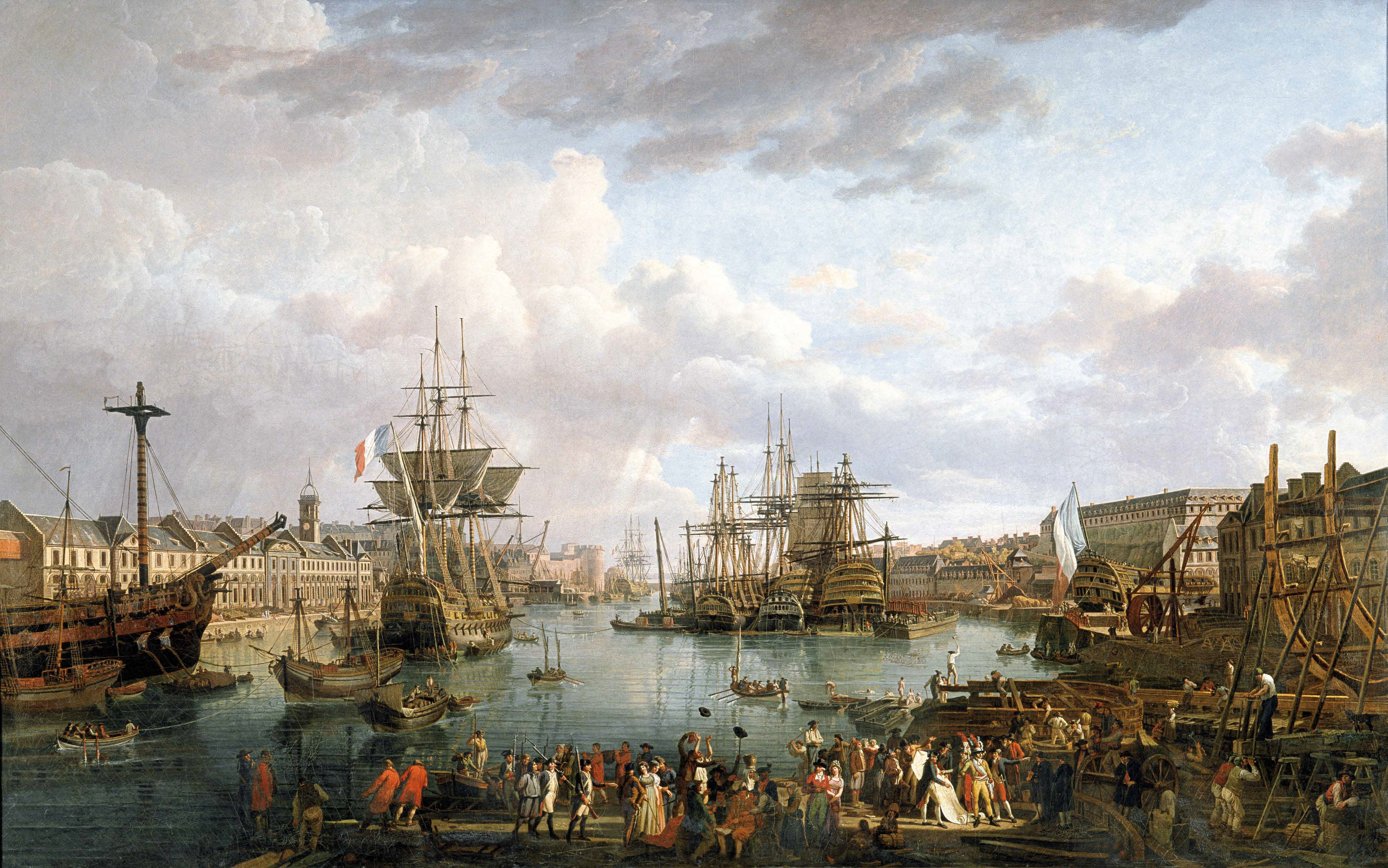
View of the Port of Brest by Jean-François Hue. General view of Brest in 1793, during the French Revolution.

Naval administration was under the authority of a Secretary of the State in 1626, the same year Cardinal Richelieu was designated as grand master of navigation. The two fleets were combined in 1642, then split in 1661. The two fleets were administered by Jean-Baptiste Colbert after 1662, during his tenure as intendant of finance and state minister, then secretary of State in 1669. A secretary of state held responsibility for the navy thereafter, until the French Revolution.

The state secretary of the navy was the administrator responsible for the French royal naval fleet and the civilian naval component, the commercial trade fleet. The secretary therefore administered both naval fleets and merchant fleets, the naval bases, the diplomatic consulates, the colonies and the French East India Company.

Other departments and bureaux were added to fleet administration over time.

- archive department, 1669;
- consulate bureau of Ponant, 1709;
- colonies bureau, 1710;
- class bureau, 1711;
- department for maps and plans, 1720;
- consulate bureau of the Levant, 1738, which merged in 1743 with the consulate bureau of Ponant under the designation of commerce and consulates bureau.

These different bureaux and departments were regrouped in four grand directorates by Marshal Charles Eugène Gabriel de La Croix in 1786.

During the French Revolution, the Flotte du Ponant was renamed the "Atlantic Squadron" (Escadre de l'Atlantique), and then the "Ocean Fleet" (Flotte de l'Océan).
