= Juan García (privateer) =

Juan Garcia
- Born: Spain
- Piratical career
- Type: Privateer
- Allegiance: Spanish Empire
- Years active: 1620s
- Rank: Captain
- Base of operations: Dunkirk
- Battles: Eighty Years' War

Juan Garcia (fl. 1622) was a 17th-century Spanish privateer. He was among a number of Spaniards who served the Spanish Crown as Dunkirkers during the Eighty Years' War. Both he and Pedro de la Plesa were caught by a Dutch Republic naval force as they attempted to break through a blockade of Dunkirk. He and de la Plesa were accused of leaving Captain Jan Jacobsen to face nine pursuing Dutch warships alone.

== Biography ==
In October 1622, he and Pedro de la Plesa left Dunkirk with Jan Jacobsen attempting to break through the blockade imposed on the city by the Dutch Republic. However, a Dutch yacht spotted Pedro de la Plesa as he sailed out of Ostend. The ship's captain, Jacob Volckertzoon Vinck, immediately sailed to a small fleet stationed nearby. Its commander, Admiral Harman Kleuter, set off after the blockade runners at once and was later joined by another squadron under Captain Lambert Hendrikszoon. Garcia and Pedro de la Plesa fled instantly upon encountering the fleet, however Jacobsen stayed behind to fight the nine pursuing warships. Both because of his heroic last stand, as well as for covering his comrades' escape, Jacobsen and his crew became national heroes.
