= Philippe-François Bart =

French naval officer (1706–1784)

Governor of Saint-Domingue
- In office 1 October 1757 – 13 February 1761
- Preceded by: Joseph-Hyacinthe de Rigaud, marquis de Vaudreuil
- Succeeded by: Gabriel de Bory de Saint-Vincent

Personal details
- Born: 28 February 1706 Dunkirk, France
- Died: 12 March 1784 (aged 78) Paris, France
- Occupation: Naval officer

Philippe-François Bart (28 February 1706 – 12 March 1784), grandson of Admiral Jean Bart, was a French naval officer who was Governor of Saint-Domingue (now Haiti) from 1757 to 1761 during the Seven Years' War.

== Early years (1706–1722) ==
Philippe-François Bart was born on 28 February 1706 in Dunkirk. (Note: One source gives Bart's date of birth as 28 February 1703.) His father was the vice-admiral François Cornil Bart (1677–1755), and his grandfather was the privateer Jean Bart (1650–1702). The Bart family had been ennobled by Louis XIV, and the letters of nobility were published in the Mercure de France in October 1694. His mother was Marie Catherine Viguereux (23 August 1686 – 25 November 1741). In 1717 he entered the Collège de Quatre Nations in Paris. His brother Gaspard-François Bart entered the school three years later.

== Naval career (1722–1756) ==
Bart joined the Gardes de la Marine in 1722. He was promoted to ship-of-the-line lieutenant (lieutenant de vaisseau) in 1741. He became a ship-of-the-line captain (capitaine de vaisseau) on 1 April 1748. He was Lieutenant de port in Fort Royal (Fort-de-France), Martinique in 1753. On 2 June 1756 in Dunkirk he married Péronne Jeanne Elisabeth Huguet du Hallier (10 January 1737 – 10 May 1774).

== Governor of Saint-Domingue (1756–1761) ==
Saint Domingue (Haiti)

The naval battle of 20 May 1756 and the taking of Menorca was followed by a formal declaration of war against France by the English. This was the start of the Seven Years' War. The declaration of war was not published in Paris until 16 June. From 29 June to 5 July various notables arrived in Dunkirk to review the situation there and consult with Captain Philippe-François Bart, commander of the navy at Dunkirk, and other heads of service. Bart was appointed Governor and Lieutenant General of Saint-Domingue on 1 October 1756, and was received by the Council of Le Cap on 14 March 1757, and by the Council of Port-au-Prince on 8 July 1757. He replaced Joseph-Hyacinthe de Rigaud.

As governor, Bart had to provide continuous support to Prince Joseph de Bauffremont, who commanded the Royal Navy in the French colonies in America. On 16 March 1757 a squadron from France under Bauffremont encountered the 50-gun HMS Greenwich near Samaná Bay, Santo Domingo, and after a two day pursuit captured the ship, which was taken to Saint Domingue. On 5 June 1757 Bauffremont entered Louisbourg with five ships of the line and a frigate from Saint Domingue. Bart and Lalanne noted in a letter of 17 November 1758 that buccaneers, who could have been a great resource, had gradually disappeared since they could not find a living since the war had begun.

In the first two years of the war there were no serious shortages in Saint Domingue, but as the English tightened up control, including seizing neutral ships and imposing a blockade, Bart and the intendant Jean-Baptiste Laporte-Lalanne began to fear a famine. Wine and flour were very expensive at Cap François between October 1757 and February 1758, but then became more affordable. Although prices fluctuated considerably, neutral traders and New England Flag of Truce ships maintained supplies. On 13 May 1761 Bart and Clugny issued an ordinance authorizing formation of a commodity market (bourse au commerce) in Le Cap.

On 26 July 1757 Bart and Laporte-Lalanne issued an ordinance defining improved postal service in the colony. On 14 February 1759 Bart issued an ordinance concerning choice of blacks to bear arms against enemies of the state, reviving and adapting an ordinance issued on 9 September 1709 by the governor Choiseul and intendant Mithon. The blacks would be rewarded by gifts, pensions or even freedom for the most distinguished actions. Bart and Jean-Etienne-Bernard de Clugny issued an ordinance on 25 April 1761 concerning registration of land titles. Bart wrote in 1761 that a total of 8,000 whites were spread along more than 300 leagues of coastline, while almost 200,000 blacks, their slaves and their enemies, were around them day and night. It was necessary that these 8,000 whites be armed, as well as their women and children.

== Last years (1761–1784) ==
Gabriel de Bory was appointed to succeed Bart on 13 February 1761, and was received by the Council of Le Cap on 30 March 1762. On 1 April 1764 Bart was promoted the squadron commander (chef d'escadre). He retired as squadron leader in 1764. On 1 January 1766 he was appointed a knight of the Order of Saint Louis. Bart died on 12 March 1784 in Paris. He had no children.

== Sources ==
- Bertrand, Raymond de (1864), Le port et le commerce maritime de Dunkerque au XVIIIe siecle, Mémoires, Societe Dunkerquoise
- "Chevalier Philippe François Bart (1706-1784)", Three Decks (in French)
- Favre, Jean Hervé, "Philippe François Bart", Geneanet (in French)
- Franklin, Alfred (1969), Histoire de la bibliotheque mazarine, Slatkine
- Jal, Auguste (1872), Dictionnaire critique de biographie et d'histoire..., Plon
- La Landelle, Guillaume Joseph Gabriel de (1868), Études marines. Jean Bart et Charles Keyser
- Marley, David F. (2008), Wars of the Americas: A Chronology of Armed Conflict in the Western Hemisphere, 1492 to the Present, ABC-CLIO, ISBN 978-1-59884-100-8
- Moreau de Saint-Méry, Médéric Louis Elie (1785), Loix et constitutions des colonies franc̜oises de l'Amérique sous le vent: 1704-1721, Chez l'auteur
- Pares, Richard (12 October 2012), War and Trade in the West Indies, Routledge, ISBN 978-1-136-25905-0
- "Philippe-François Bart", Ecole Navale (in French)
- Vaissière, Pierre de (2013), Saint-Domingue (in French), Рипол Классик, ISBN 978-5-88266-014-6
