= Pedro de la Plesa =

Spanish privateer

- Born: Spain
- Piratical career
- Type: Privateer
- Allegiance: Spanish Empire
- Years active: 1620s
- Rank: Captain
- Base of operations: Dunkirk
- Battles: Eighty Years' War

Pedro de la Plesa (fl. 1622) was a 17th-century Spanish privateer. He served as a Dunkirker in the service of the Spanish Crown during the Eighty Years' War. He and Juan Garcia gained notoriety for abandoning their comrade Captain Jan Jacobsen in his final naval battle against the Dutch Republic.

== Biography ==
In October 1622, he left from Dunkirk along with Juan Garcia and Jan Jacobsen in an attempt to break through the enemy blockade. However, de la Plesa was immediately sighted by a passing Dutch yacht as he sailed out of Ostend. The ship's captain, Jacob Volckertzoon Vinck, cut his mooring lines and sailed out to a nearby fleet under Admiral Harman Kleuter. Being informed of the Dunkirkers activities, he set out after them at once. He was later joined by another squadron from Den Briel under the command of Captain Lambert Hendrikszoon. As the combined fleet appeared, the two Spaniards realizing they were outnumbered chose to retreat. Sailing toward England, Jan Jacobsen chose to fight the nine pursuing warships. Whether Jacobsen had decided to make a final stand or to cover the retreat of Juan Garcia and Pedro de la Plesa is uncertain, however he died in the long, hard-fought battle.
