= Jan Jacobsen =

Flemish naval commander

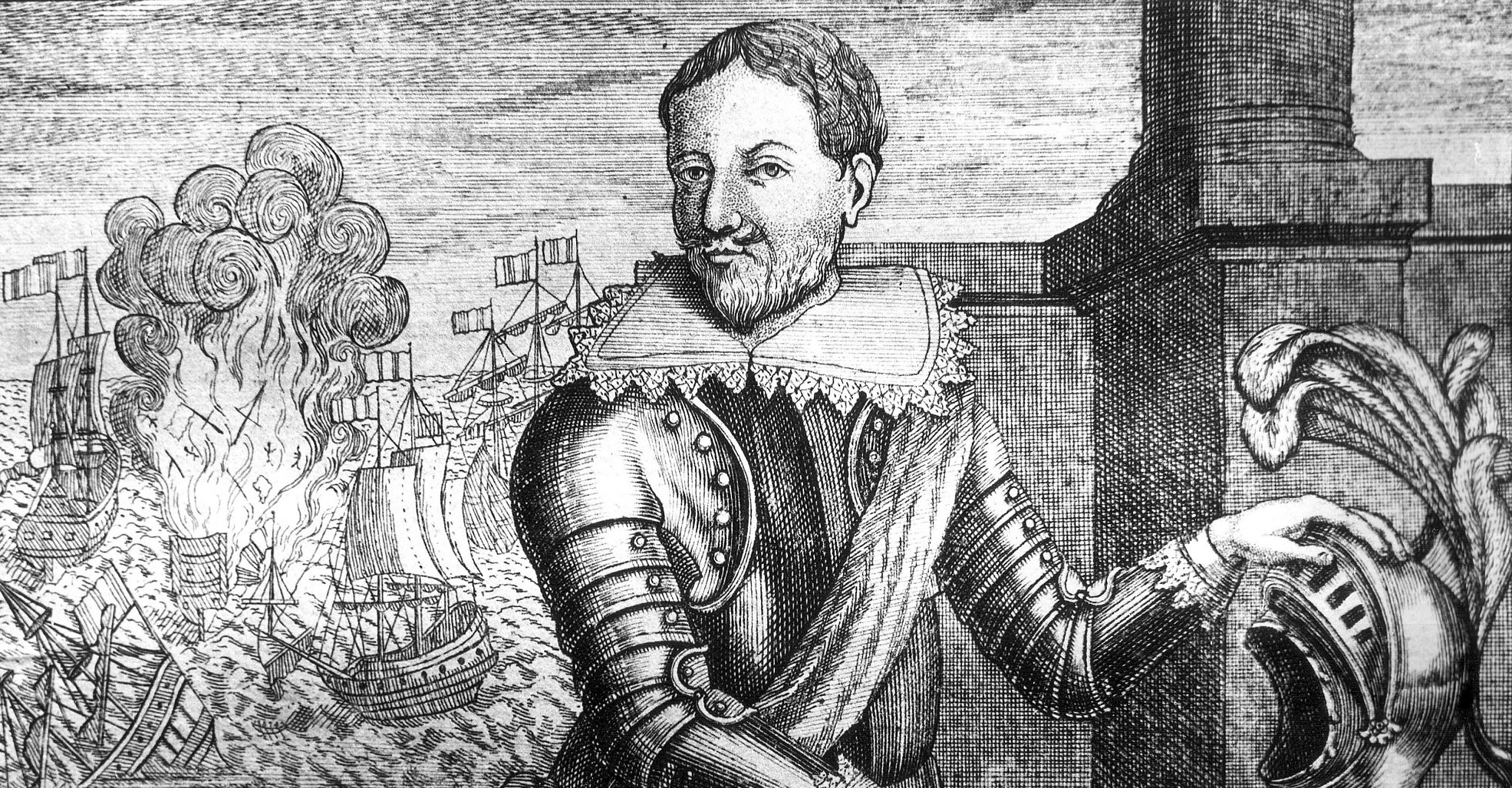
- Died: 1622, aged 33; North Sea
- Piratical career
- Type: Dunkirker
- Allegiance: Habsburg
- Rank: Captain
- Base of operations: Ostend
- Commands: one
- Battles: Eighty Years' War

Jan Jacobsen (1588/89 – 1622) was a Flemish naval commander and Dunkirker during the Eighty Years' War. He became a posthumous hero when, after battling an enemy fleet for over 13 hours, he destroyed his own ship rather than surrender.

== Biography ==
He was the son of Spanish admiral Michel Jacobsen and great-uncle of French admiral Jean Bart. On 3 October 1622 Jacobsen put out from Ostend on his first expedition as a captain of one of the king's frigates. His ship was part of a three-ship flotilla, with the intention of locating the Dutch Baltic convoy, accompanied by Spanish privateers Pedro de la Plesa and Juan Garcia. Jacobsen failed to elude the Dutch blockaders patrolling off the Flemish coast and was soon in a running battle with nine Dutch warships which was to last for thirteen hours. He disabled two of them before finally fought to a standstill with his mast, rudder and sweeps shot away.

The Dutch called upon Jacobsen to surrender and offered quarter, but, rather than let one of the king's ships fall into the hands of the enemy he exploded his powder store. In doing so he crippled the two Dutch ships alongside and caused considerable loss of life on board them but at the cost of destroying himself, his ship and much of what remained of his crew. Initial reports had Jacobsen putting the match to the powder himself, but at least one later account records that he had been shot through the thigh and gave the order to explode the powder store to one of his men. Surviving members of his 170-man crew that were picked up were hanged as pirates.

This incident was comparable to English admiral Sir Richard Grenville and the Revenge and created a mystique around the Dunkirkers, and the figure of Jacobsen in particular, at the very beginning of the second phase (1621–1648) of the Eighty Years' War. The event was reported in contemporary newspapers, such as the Nieuwe Tijdinghen printed in Antwerp, and was the subject of at least one contemporary ballad, Kapiteyn Jacobus, that likened Jacobsen to Samson.
