= Battle of Dogger Bank (1696) =

1696 battle of the Nine Years' War

- Part of the Nine Years' War
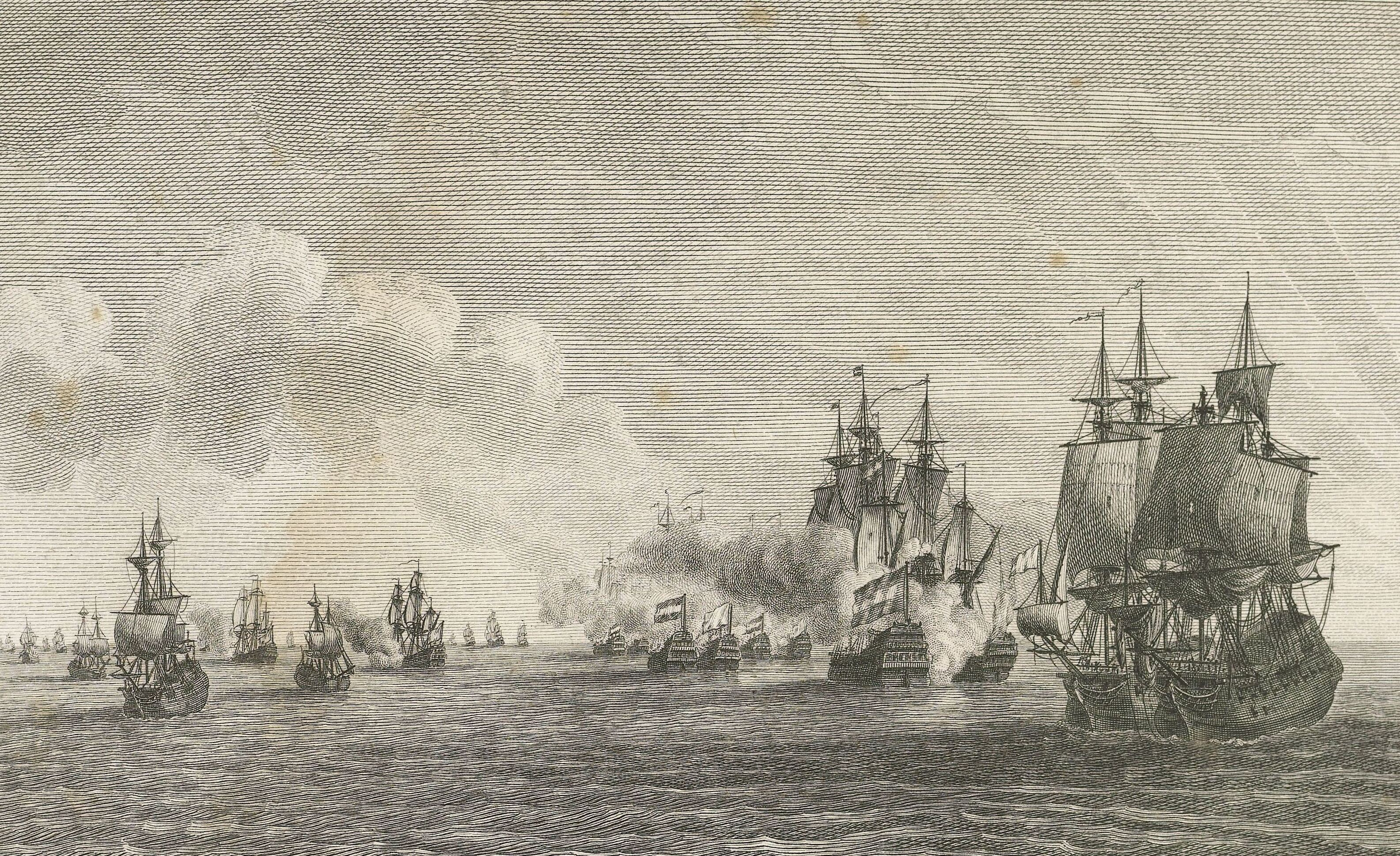
- 1806 print of the battle by Yves-Marie Le Gouaz
Date	17 June 1696
Location	Dogger Bank, Atlantic Ocean 54.724°N 2.769°E
Result	French victory

Belligerents
France	Dutch Republic

Commanders and leaders
Jean Bart	Rutger Bucking †

Strength
7 frigates 1 fireship 2 longboats 2 privateers	5 frigates 112 merchant ships

Casualties and losses
31 killed and wounded	1,200 captured 1 frigate captured 4 frigates destroyed 25 merchant ships destroyed

The Battle of Dogger Bank was a naval battle fought on 17 June 1696 as part of the War of the Grand Alliance. It was a victory for a French force of seven ships over a Dutch force of five ships and the convoy it was escorting.

== Battle ==
French privateer Jean Bart found a Dutch convoy of 112 merchant ships, escorted by five Dutch ships near Dogger Bank.

The French had more warships and more cannons than the Dutch, had experienced crews and their commander was considered to be exceptional. However, the French had to hurry because a large English squadron under Admiral John Benbow was aware of the French presence and was looking for them.

The battle started on 19:00, when Bart on the Maure attacked the Dutch flagship, the Raadhuis-van-Haarlem. The Dutch fought for three hours until their captain was killed before they surrendered.

Bart captured and burned 25 merchant ships until Benbow's squadron of 18 ships approached. The French squadron fled towards Denmark. They remained there until July and then slipped through the allied lines into Dunkirk with 1200 prisoners, on 27 September.

== Ships involved ==
=== France ===
- Maure, frigate, 54 cannons, flagship of captain Jean Bart: 15 killed, 16 wounded.
- Adroit, frigate, 44 cannons
- Mignon, frigate, 44 cannons
- Jersey, frigate, 40 cannons
- Comte, frigate, 40 cannons
- Alcyon, frigate, 38 cannons
- Milfort, frigate, 36 cannons
- Tigre, fire ship
- Saint Jean, long boat
- Deux Frères, long boat
- Lamberly, 8 cannons, privateer
- Bonne Espérance, 6 cannons, privateer

=== Dutch Republic ===
- Raadhuis van Haarlem, 44 cannons, flagship of captain Rutger Bucking (killed): captured and burnt
- Comte de Solms, 38 cannons, captured
- Weldam, 38 cannons, captured and burnt
- ?, 24 cannons, captured and burnt
- ?, 24 cannons, captured and burnt
- 112 merchant ships, of which 25 were captured and burnt
