= Yves-Marie Le Gouaz =

French engraver

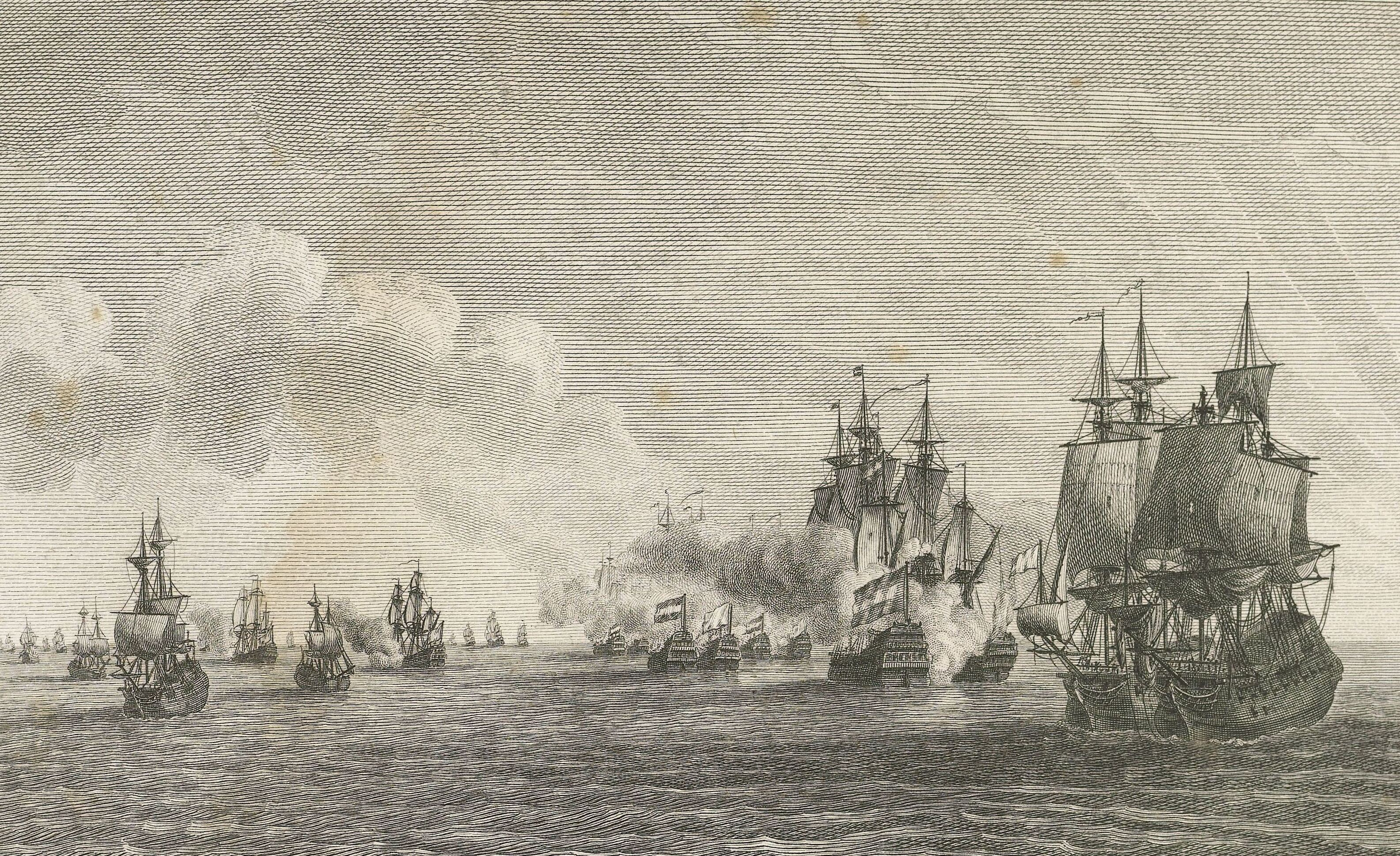
1806 print of the Battle of Dogger Bank

Yves-Marie Le Gouaz, (15 February 1742 – 12 June 1816) was a French engraver.

== Life ==
A student of Nicolas Ozanne (he married Ozanne's sister Marie-Jeanne Ozanne) and then of Jacques Aliamet, in 1770 he became engraver to the Académie des sciences, which put him in charge of creating many new works. Le Gouaz was a talented artist, and made 60 engravings of French ports based on drawings by Ozanne. He also produced the Pêche de jour, the Pêche de nuit, the Choix du poisson, the Embarquement de la jeune Grecque after Vernet; Fin d'orage, after Peters, etc.
