= The Battle of Texel (Isabey) =

Painting by Eugène Isabey

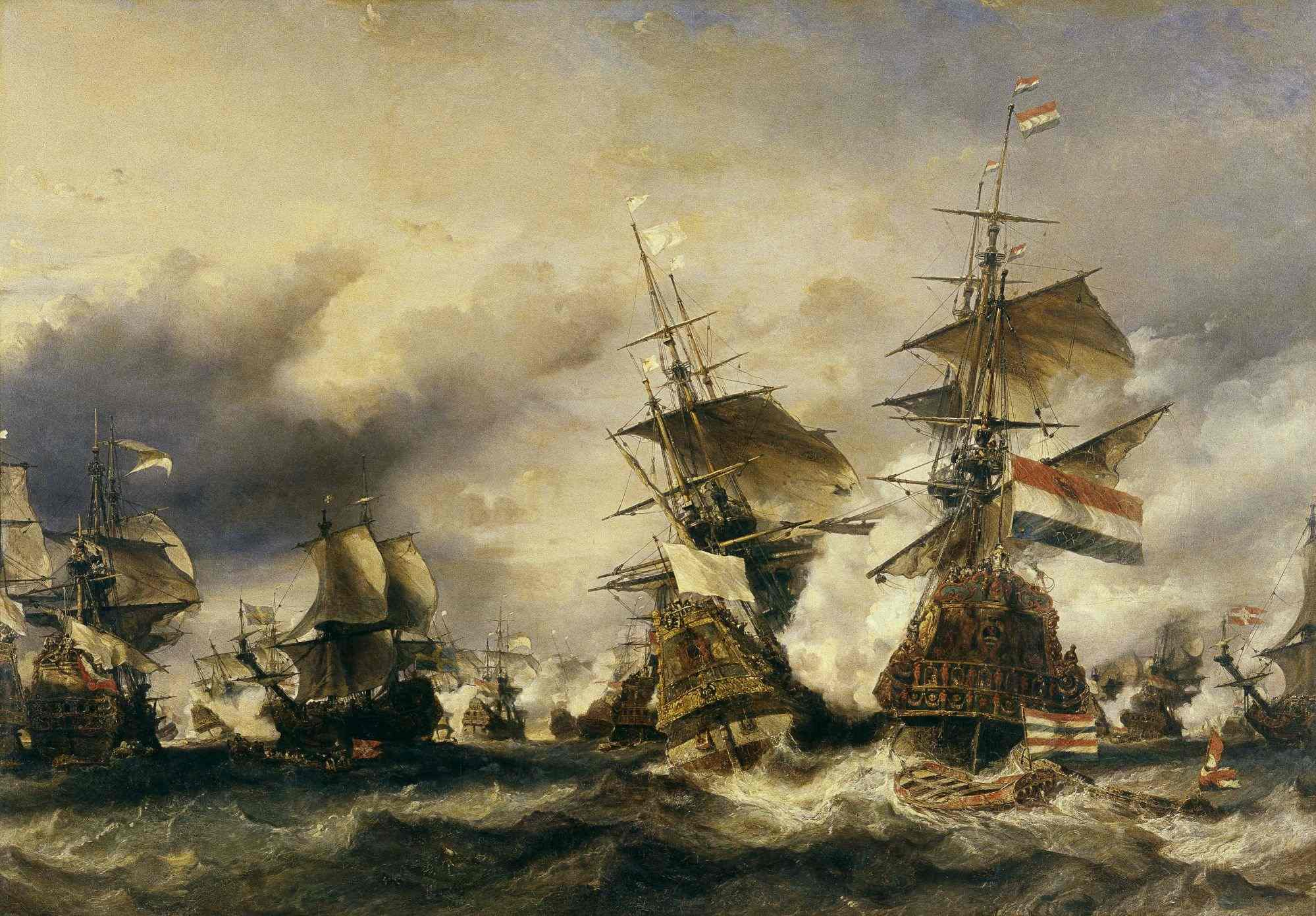
- Artist: Eugène Isabey
- Year: 1839
- Medium: Oil on canvas
- Dimensions: 250 cm × 358.5 cm (98 in × 141.1 in)
- Location: Musée national de la Marine, Paris

The Battle of Texel (French: Combat du Texel) is an 1839 historical seascape painting by the French artist Eugène Isabey.

== History and description ==
It depicts a scene from the Battle of Texel fought on 29 June 1694 during the Nine Years' War off the coast of Holland. It was a victory for squadron of the French Navy led by Jean Bart over the Dutch led by Hidde Sjoerds de Vries who died of wounds sustained in battle. The triumph of Bart, who recaptured a merchant convoy he had been ordered to escort, achieved a legendary status in France.

Isabey was a noted romantic painter of seascapes who enjoyed success in the era of the July Monarchy. The painting was displayed at the Salon of 1839 held at the Louvre in Paris and was originally commissioned to hang at the Palace of Versailles. Today it is in the collection of the city's Musée national de la Marine.

== Bibliography ==
- Leribault, Christophe. Eugène Isabey. Louvre, 2012.
- Miquel, Pierre. Eugène Isabey, 1803–1886. Martinelle, 1980.
- Noon, Patrick & Bann, Stephen. Constable to Delacroix: British Art and the French Romantics. Tate, 2003.
- Le Corre, Florence & Rivière, Cécile. 19th-century painters of the Opal Coast. Somogy, 2013.
