= Battle of Texel (1694) =

1694 battle of the Nine Years' War

Coordinates: 53.1500°N 4.6000°E

- Part of the Nine Years' War
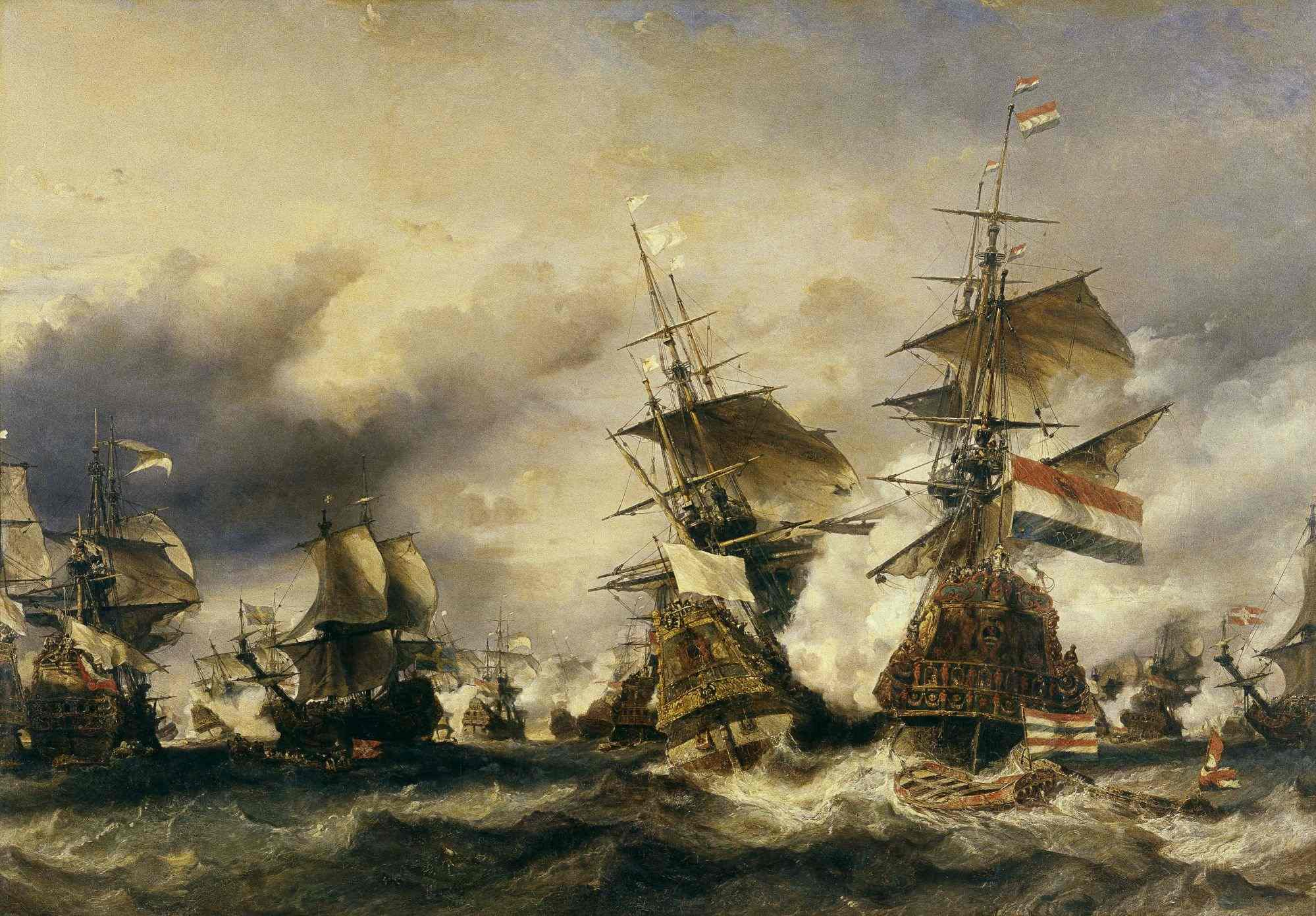
- The Battle of Texel; Eugène Isabey, 1839
Date	29 June 1694
Location	Off Texel, North Sea
Result	French victory

Belligerents
France	Dutch Republic

Commanders and leaders
Jean Bart	Hidde Sjoerds de Vries †

Strength
7 frigates	8 frigates 120 merchant ships

Casualties and losses
66 killed or wounded	229 killed or wounded 455 captured 3 frigates captured

The Battle of Texel was a sea battle fought during the Nine Years' War on 29 June 1694, when a force of eight French ships, under Jean Bart, recaptured a French convoy, which had earlier that month been taken by the Dutch, and captured three ships of the escorting force (consisting of eight ships) under Hidde Sjoerds de Vries. De Vries was captured by the French, but shortly after died of wounds.

== Background ==
In 1692 and 1693 there were massive harvest failures in France, leading to acute famine and epidemics. From 1693 to 1694 over two million people died. Therefore, France needed to import large quantities of grain from neutral countries like Poland-Lithuania, Sweden and Denmark-Norway.

On 29 May 1694 Jean Bart was instructed to sail to Norway, to escort a huge fleet of 120 ships full of grain to France. The convoy did not wait for the arrival of Bart's squadron and left under the protection of three neutral warships (two Danish and one Swedish).

== Battle ==
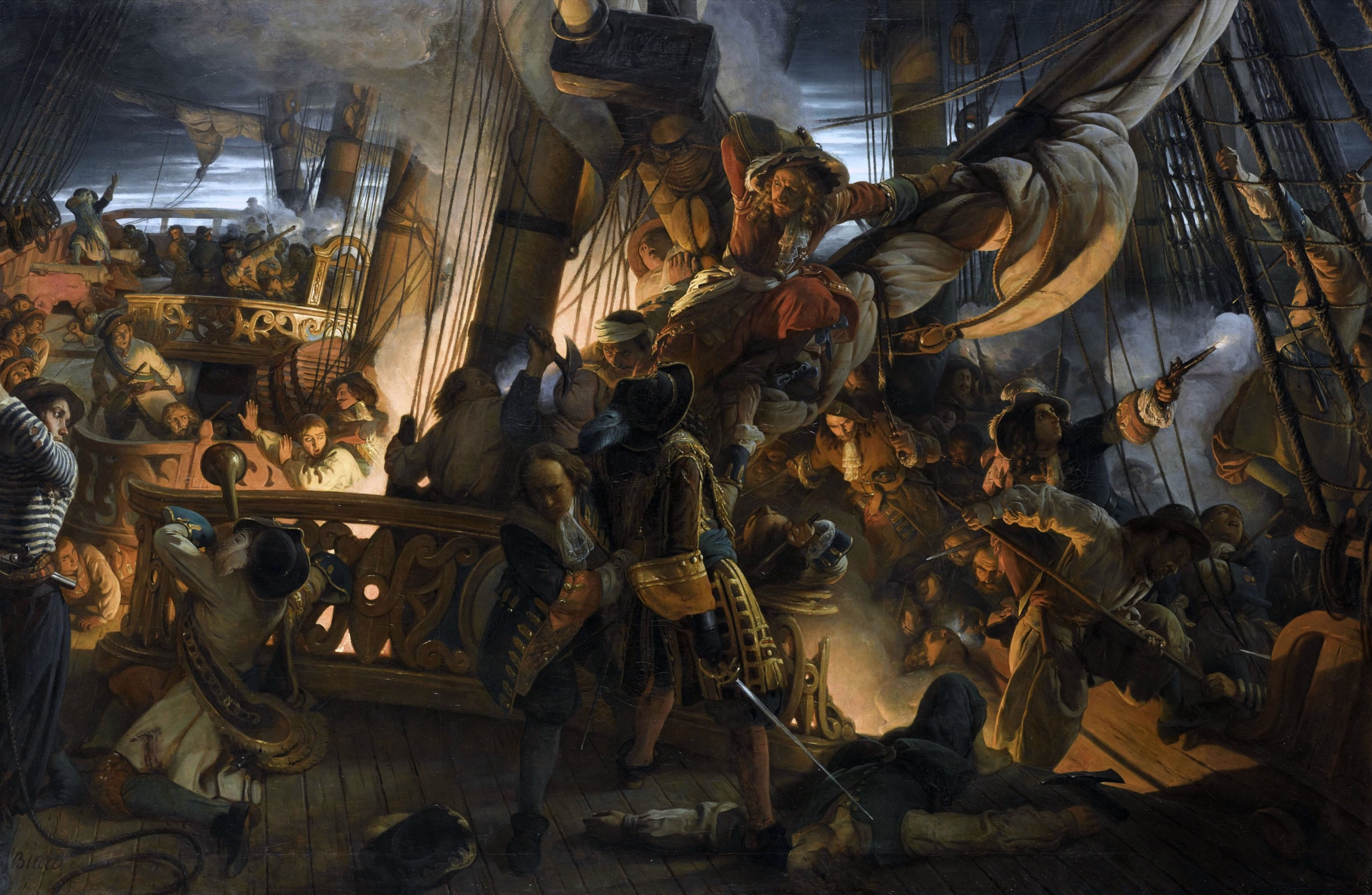
1843 painting of the battle by François-Auguste Biard

The convoy was immediately captured by the Dutch without a shot being fired. Jean Bart searched for the convoy and found it on 29 June at 3:00 a.m. before the Dutch island of Texel. Despite having fewer guns than the Dutch, at 5:00 a.m. Jean Bart attacked the Dutch flagship of Hidde Sjoerds de Vries. After a fierce battle which lasted only half an hour, the Prins Friso was captured, with Hidde Sjoerds de Vries severely wounded and taken prisoner. Two other Dutch ships were also taken, with the remaining five fleeing to their harbor. The Dutch losses amounted to 100 killed, 129 wounded and 455 prisoners.

Jean Bart repaired the damage to his ships and took the convoy to Dunkirk, where it arrived on 3 July, received by an enormous crowd celebrating their hero. On 5 July Jean Bart, his son François Cornil and his brother-in-law were invited to Versailles and congratulated by King Louis XIV in person. Jean Bart was raised into the nobility on 4 August 1694. Hidde Sjoerds de Vries died of his wounds on 1 July 1694.

== Order of battle ==
=== French Navy ===
- Maure (54); Bart's flagship
- Fortuné (50)
- Mignon (50)
- Jersey (50)
- Comte (40)
- Adroit (44)
- Portefaix (24)

=== Dutch States Navy ===
- Prins Friso (58); de Vries' flagship, captured by Maure
- Prinses Amalia (58)
- Stad Vlissingen (54)
- Ooster-Stelling (50)
- Statenland (50); captured by Mignon
- Beschermer (44)
- Oudenaarde (40)
- Zeerijp (34); captured by Fortuné
- 120 merchant ships
