= Morris Bart =

American attorney

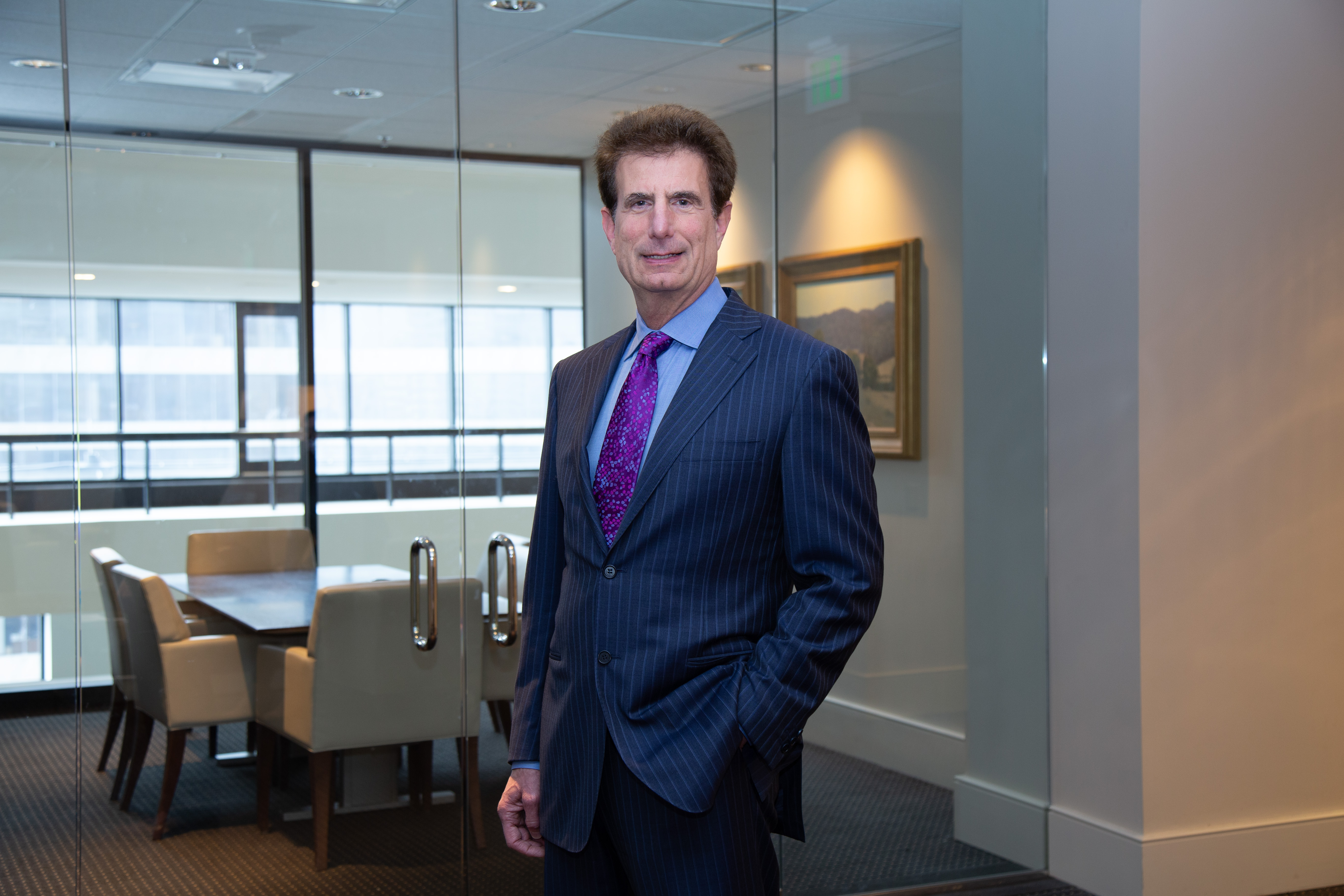
- Born: Morris Bart, III; Knoxville, TN
- Citizenship: American
- Education: University of New Orleans (BA); Loyola University Law School (JD)
- Occupation: Attorney
- Known for: Founder of the Morris Bart Firm
- Spouse: Cathy
- Website: www.morrisbart.com/about/attorneys/morris-bart/

Morris Bart III is an American attorney who founded the Morris Bart Firm, the largest personal injury law firm in New Orleans. He is known for his advertising which has made his name “synonymous with Louisiana legal culture” and a regional fixture

== Education ==
Bart is a native of Knoxville, TN, moving to New Orleans with his family at the age of four in 1962. He attended the University of New Orleans, graduating with a B.A. in 1975. He then earned his J.D. from Loyola University Law School in 1978.

== Morris Bart Firm ==
Morris Bart Personal Injury Lawyers
- Headquarters: 601 Poydras Street; New Orleans, LA 70130
- No. of offices: 15
- No. of attorneys: 100+
- Website: www.morrisbart.com

Bart began practicing law after passing the bar in 1978. In 1980, he became the first attorney in the state to begin advertising his services, with the catchphrase "one call, that's all." Thanks to his advertising, Bart's name has become “synonymous with Louisiana legal culture.”

The firm's advertising went viral in 2015 when a mother threw her two-year-old, who was "fixated" with the attorney a Morris Bart-themed birthday party, leading to international coverage including an appearance for Bart and the family on Jimmy Kimmel Live. His firm is the largest personal injury firm in New Orleans. As of 2023, it employed over 100 attorneys across four states. Its offices are located on three floors of the Pan-American Life Center, with Bart's office located on the 24th floor.

== Hot Sauce ==
In 2025, Bart developed a hot sauce, first as a giveaway to his clients, and later formed a company. Morris Bart's Louisiana Hot Sauce went on sale in 2026 at Rouses Markets locations in Louisiana, Mississippi, and Alabama. Bart has said he modeled the brand on Newman's Own, its profits go to food insecurity charities including Second Harvest Food Bank.

== Personal ==
Bart's uncle was Ben Bart, founder of the Universal Attractions Agency in New York City and featured as James Brown's agent in the film, Get On Up. His mother, Hertha Rosenblum Bart, was originally from Switzerland. She met his father, Morris Bart Jr., while he was on leave from his post as a pilot in the 82nd Reconnaissance Squadron while stationed in Europe.

Bart has been a producer of three films, including Factory Girl, a biographical film of Andy Warhol associate Edie Sedgwick, which was released in 2006.

In 2020, Bart contracted COVID-19. After recovering, he donated antibodies.

Bart is a major political donor to the Democratic Party. People or political action committees affiliated with his firm gave nearly $300,000 to Democratic groups and candidates to support Kamala Harris in 2024.
