= Church of Saint-Éloi, Dunkirk =

Church in Dunkirk, France

Church of Saint-Éloi
- French: Église Saint-Éloi de Dunkerque
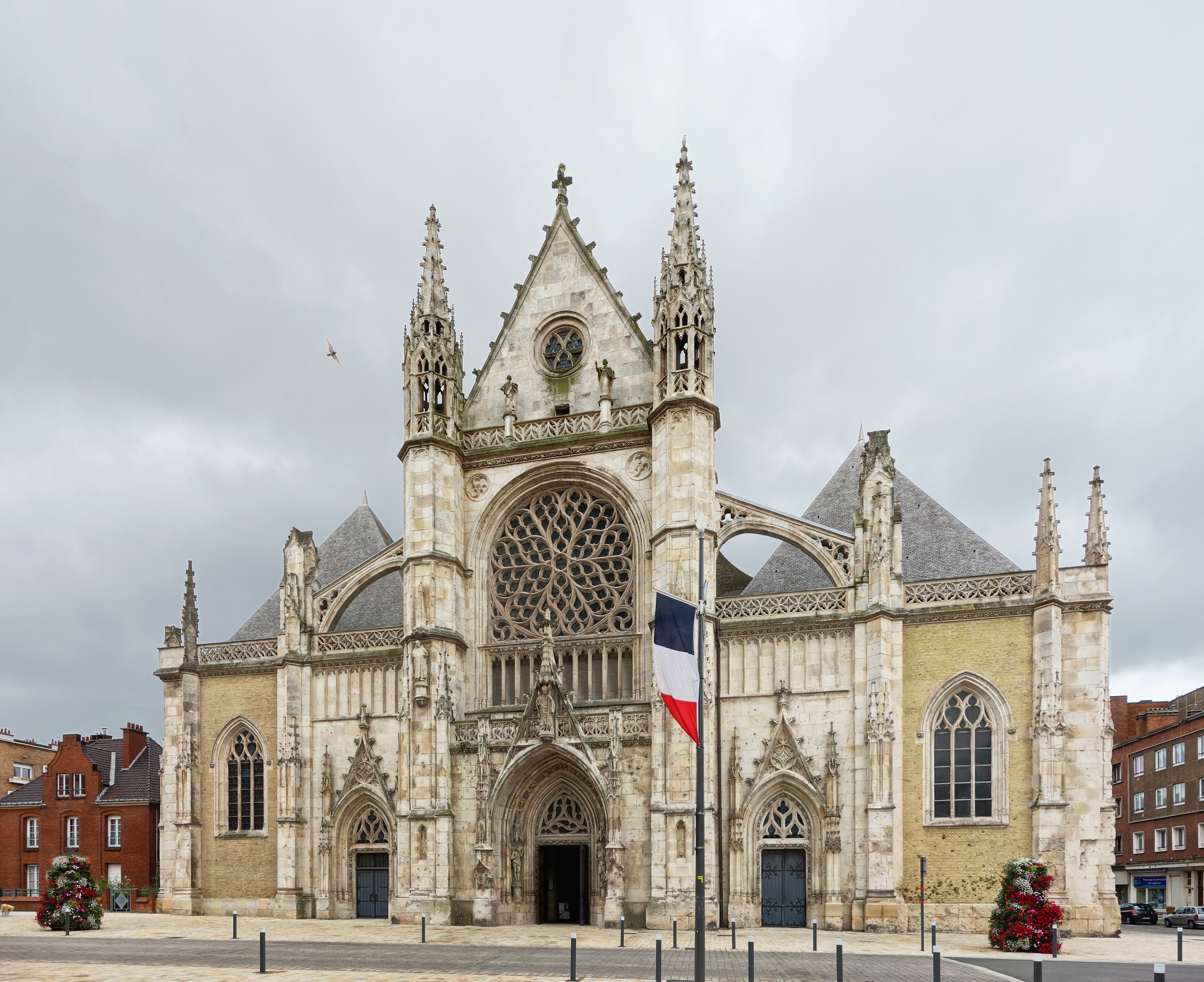

- Location within Hauts-de-France
- 51°02′08″N 2°22′37″E
- Location: Dunkirk, Nord
- Country: France
- Denomination: Roman Catholic

History
- Status: Church
- Dedication: Saint Eligius

Architecture
- Functional status: Active
- Architectural type: Church
- Style: Gothic; Gothic Revival
- Years built: 1567; 1782; 1887

Administration
- Diocese: Lille

Monument historique
- Official name: Eglise Saint-Eloi
- Criteria: Class MH
- Designated: 30 October 1916
- Reference no.: PA00107488

The Church of Saint-Éloi (French: église Saint-Éloi), nicknamed the Cathedral of the Sands, is a Roman Catholic church in Dunkirk, France. It was listed as a Historic Monument in 1916, whereas the belfry of the original church across the street was listed in 1840. The belfry is also part of the World Heritage-listed Belfries of Belgium and France.

== History ==
The original church of the mid-15th century had the shape of a Latin cross. It was consecrated around 1443. It is said to have been erected by prime contractors from Ghent on the site of St. John's Hospice. In 1558, the French troops led by Maréchal de Thermes invaded the city and burnt the church. Only the tower survived. The re-construction of the church started in 1559 under the supervision of prime contractor Jean de Renneville and ended in 1567. The sanctuary was enlarged to the east, the main nave was elevated and the side aisles were re-built with chapels. However, the works were stopped in 1585 because of a lack of funding. The old tower remained isolated from the new church by the ruins of the original church and served as a bell tower, municipal belfry and daymark. The original project was never ended.

The space between the new church and the belfry was transformed into a public pathway in 1591, then into a street in 1731.

In 1782, extension works were made by architect Victor Louis on the behalf of intendant de Calonne to cope with the population growth. Victor Louis offered to move the outer walls beyond the abutments of the side aisles and to merge the two side chapels to build two additional naves. The works lasted until 1787. The campanile added in 1610 was demolished and a new façade (dated 1785) was built. The façade is a Classical portico with pediments and pillars. Between 1793 and 1795, the building was used as a Temple of Reason.

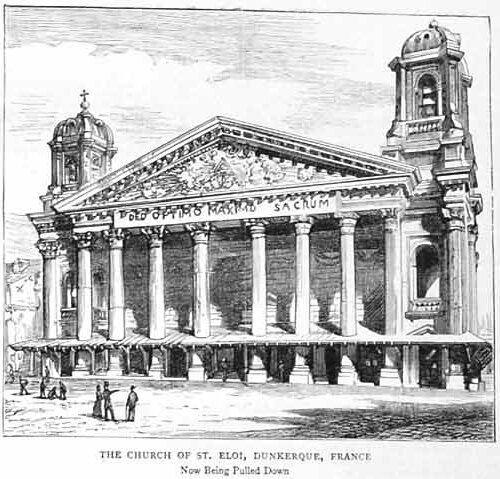
St. Éloi before demolition work. The Graphic 1883

In 1882, the disintegrating façade was demolished and replaced with a new one. The Gothic Revival project of architect Adolphe Van Moë was selected. The first stone was laid on April 11, 1887, and the new façade was ended in 1889 by the city architect Jules Lecoq.

The church was heavily damaged during the First World War, in 1915 and 1917. After long restoration works funded by the war damage compensation (dommages de guerre), the church was re-opened. But in May and June 1940, it was hit by incendiary bombs and only the walls survived. Even though the church was re-opened for worship in 1977, the restoration works lasted until 1985.

== Architecture ==
The long church is made of bricks, except for the window frames, the pillars of the interior and the façade that are made of white stone.

The interior of the church has five aisles, the central aisle being wider than the other ones. The aisles lead to a double ambulatory with five apse chapels. The nave has three bays, while the choir has three bays and five ambulatory bays. Two sacristies are adjacent to two bays of the second side aisle of the choir.

== Furniture ==
The major part of the furniture prior to 1940 was destroyed. Thus, the church benefited of donations of furniture from the Church of Saint-Jean-Baptiste of the 18th and 19th centuries.

The stained glass windows of the choir and the rose window were made by Pierre Gaudin. The other stained glass windows were made by Henry Lhotellier from the drafts of painter Arthur Van Hecke.

The modern main organ was made by Gonzaled in 1970. It has three 56-chord keyboards of each, a 32-chord mechanical pedalboard, and electric stops. It was recently restored and enlarged by Bernard Dargassies.

== Tomb ==
The sacristy of Saint-Éloi hosts the remains of the corsair Jean-Bart (1650–1702) who became famous for the Battle of Texel.

== Gallery ==
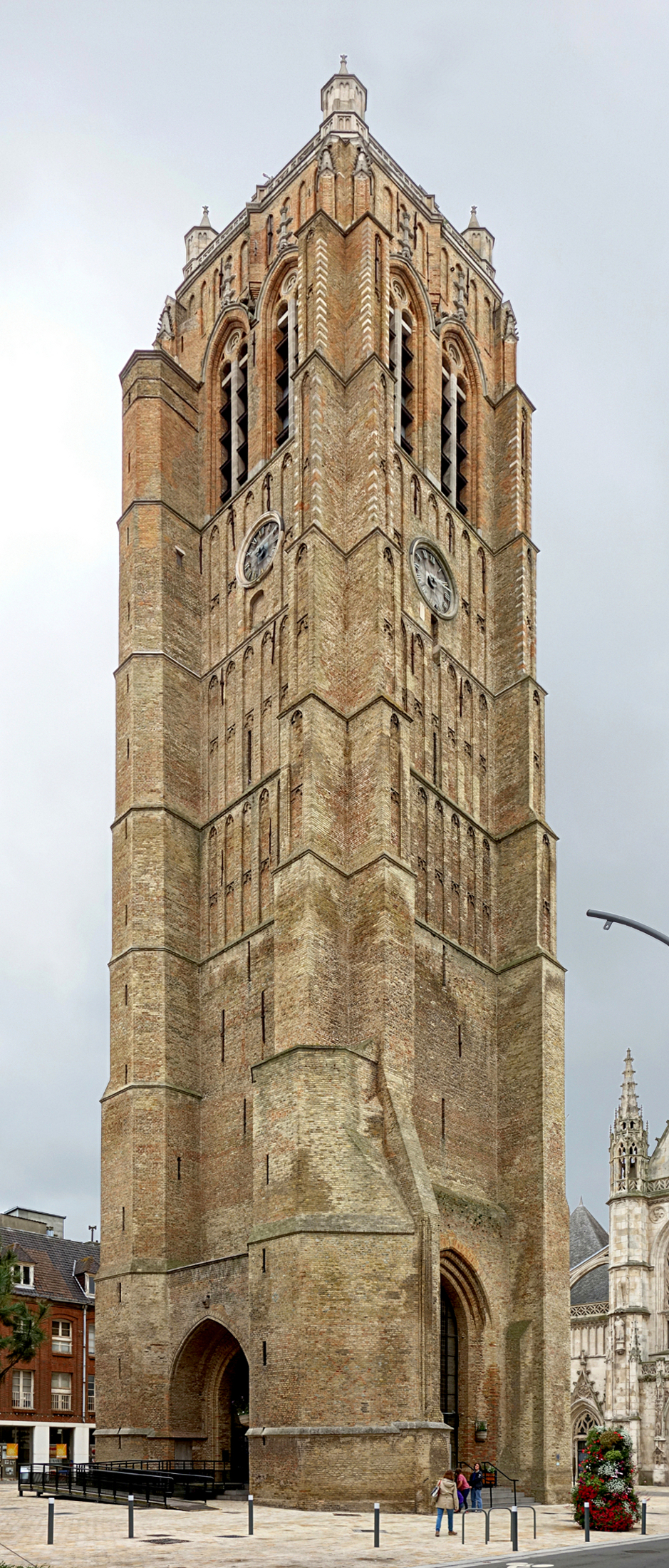
The belfry

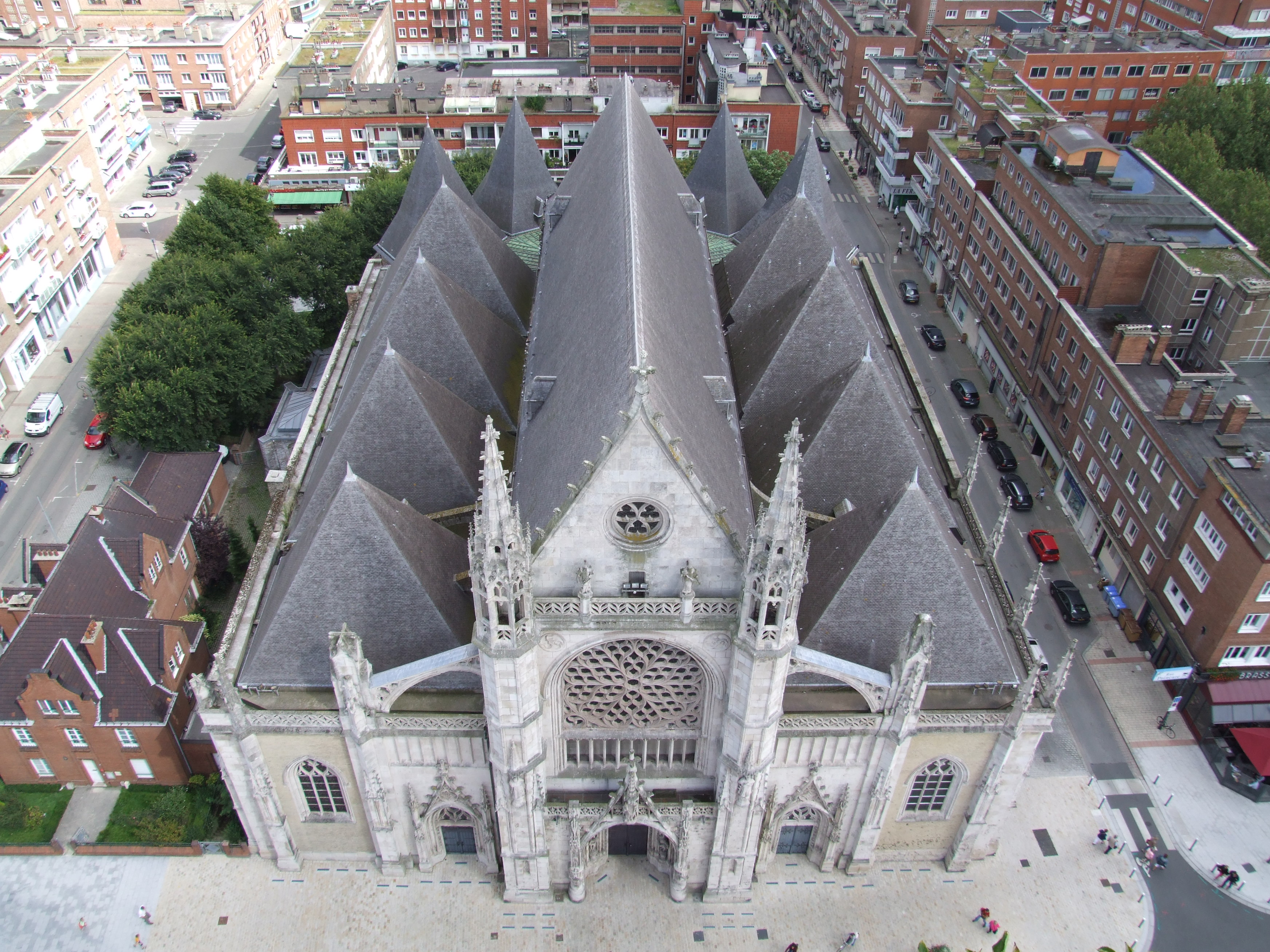
The church seen from the belfry

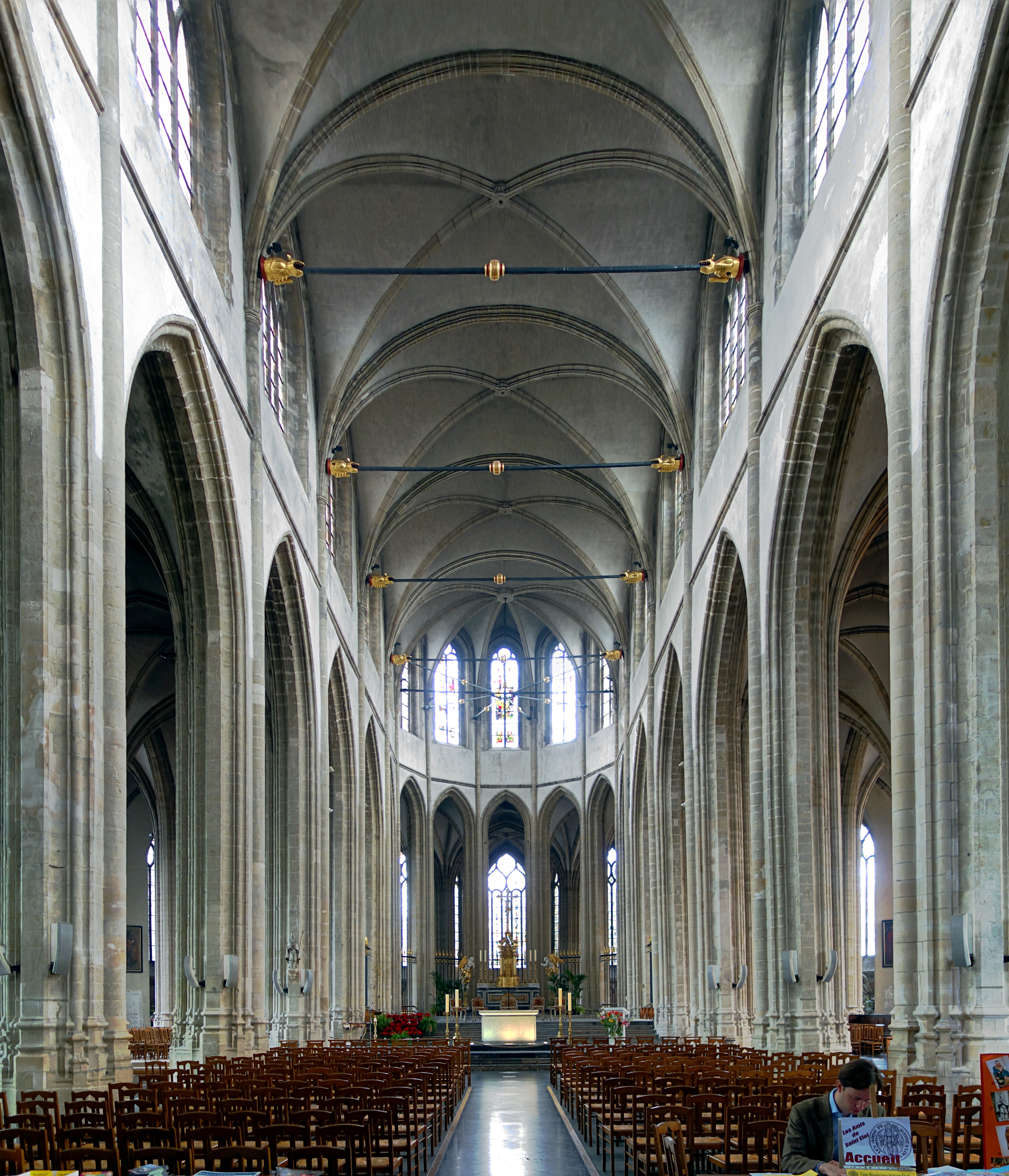
The central nave

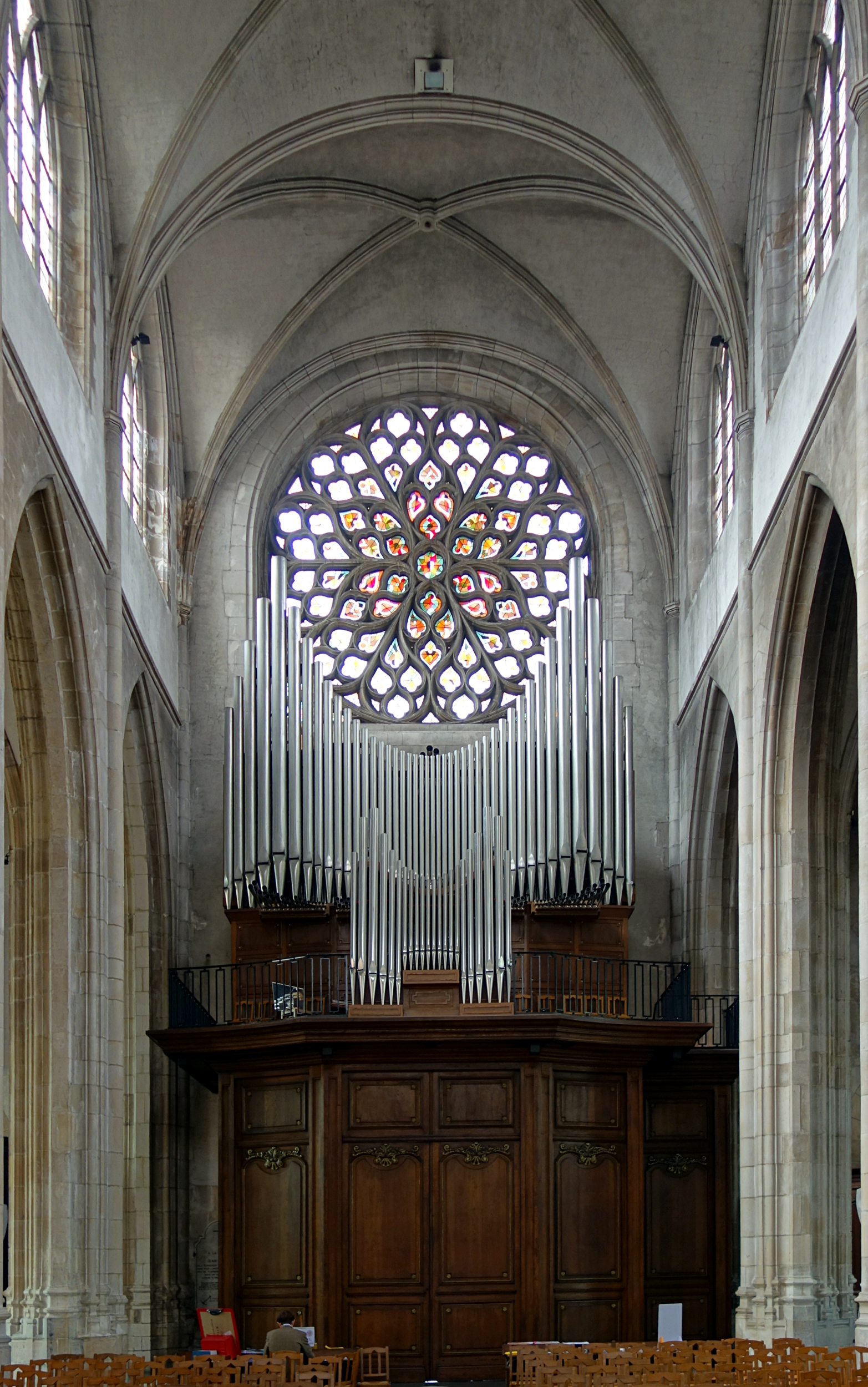
The main organ

== See also ==
- Belfry of Dunkerque

== Bibliography ==
- Tillie, Jacques (1985). Saint-Éloi de Dunkerque : cinq siècles d'histoire (in French). Éd. Kim.
