= Mathieu Elias =

French painter

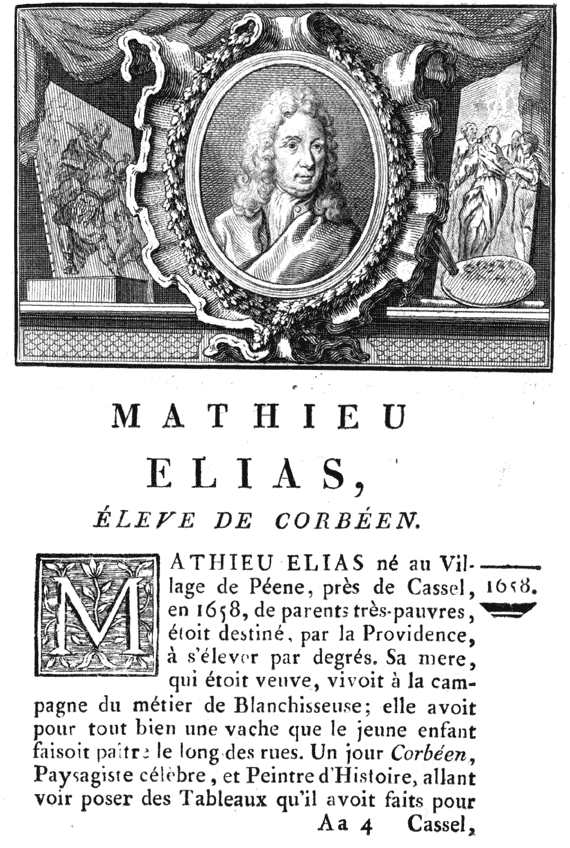
Portrait of and begin of entry on Elias, in Jean-Baptiste Descamps' La vie des peintres flamands, allemands et hollandois, 1760

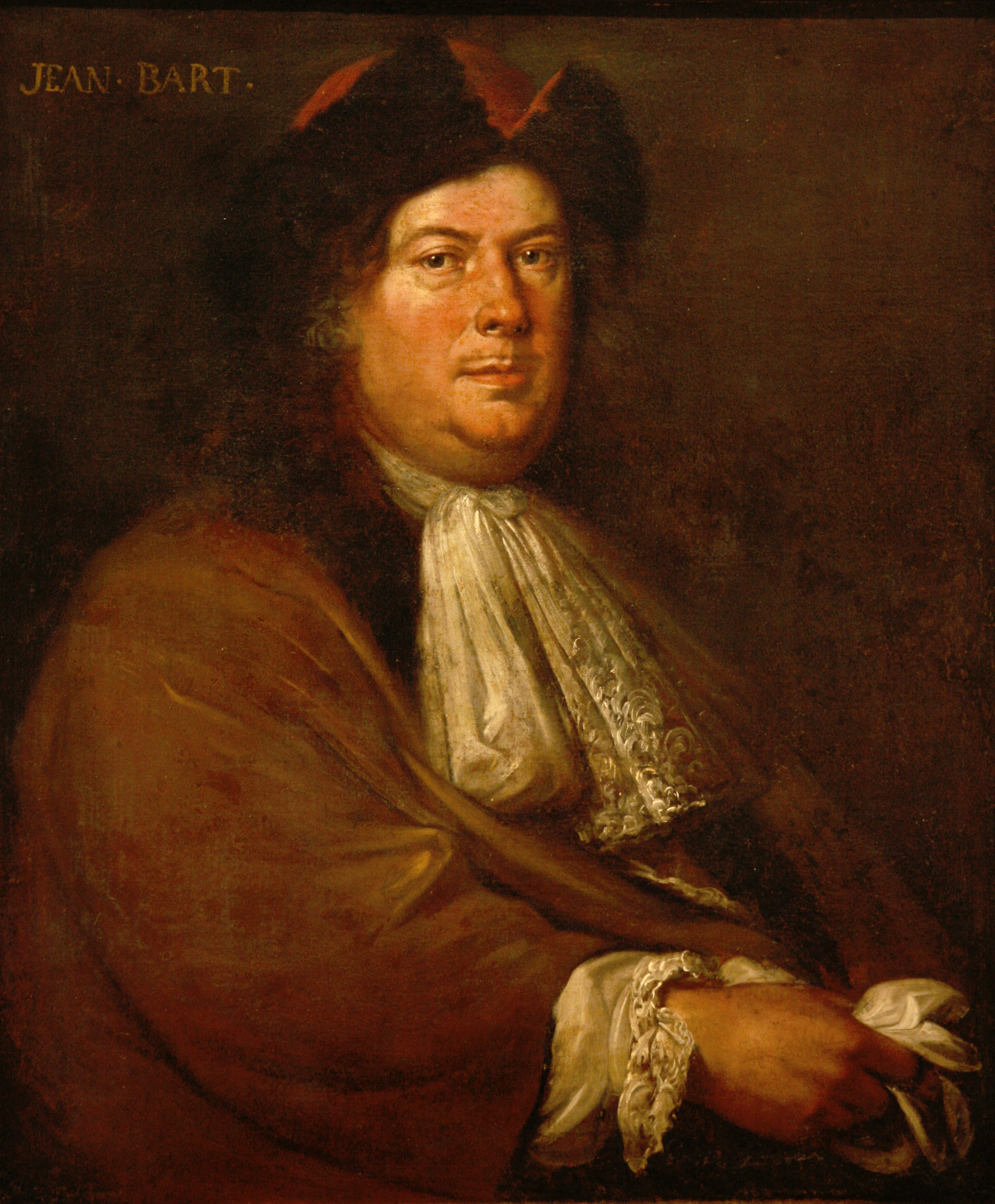
Jean Bart, now in the Musée national de la Marine

Mathieu Elias, Elyas, or Elie (1658–1741), was a baroque painter. He was born at Peena, near Cassel. His parents were extremely poor, and he was employed when a boy in attending cattle, in which humble situation he was noticed by a painter of Dunkirk, named Philippe De Corbehem, tracing objects on the ground. The artist, struck with the singularity of the circumstance and the evident disposition of the boy, prevailed on his mother to entrust him to his care. After instructing him for some time he sent him to Paris for improvement, where he met with employment, and resided several years. On the death of De Corbehem, he settled at Dunkirk, and painted some altar-pieces for the churches in that town and its neighbourhood. He died at Dunkirk in 1741.
