= Hidde Sjoerds de Vries =

Dutch States Navy officer

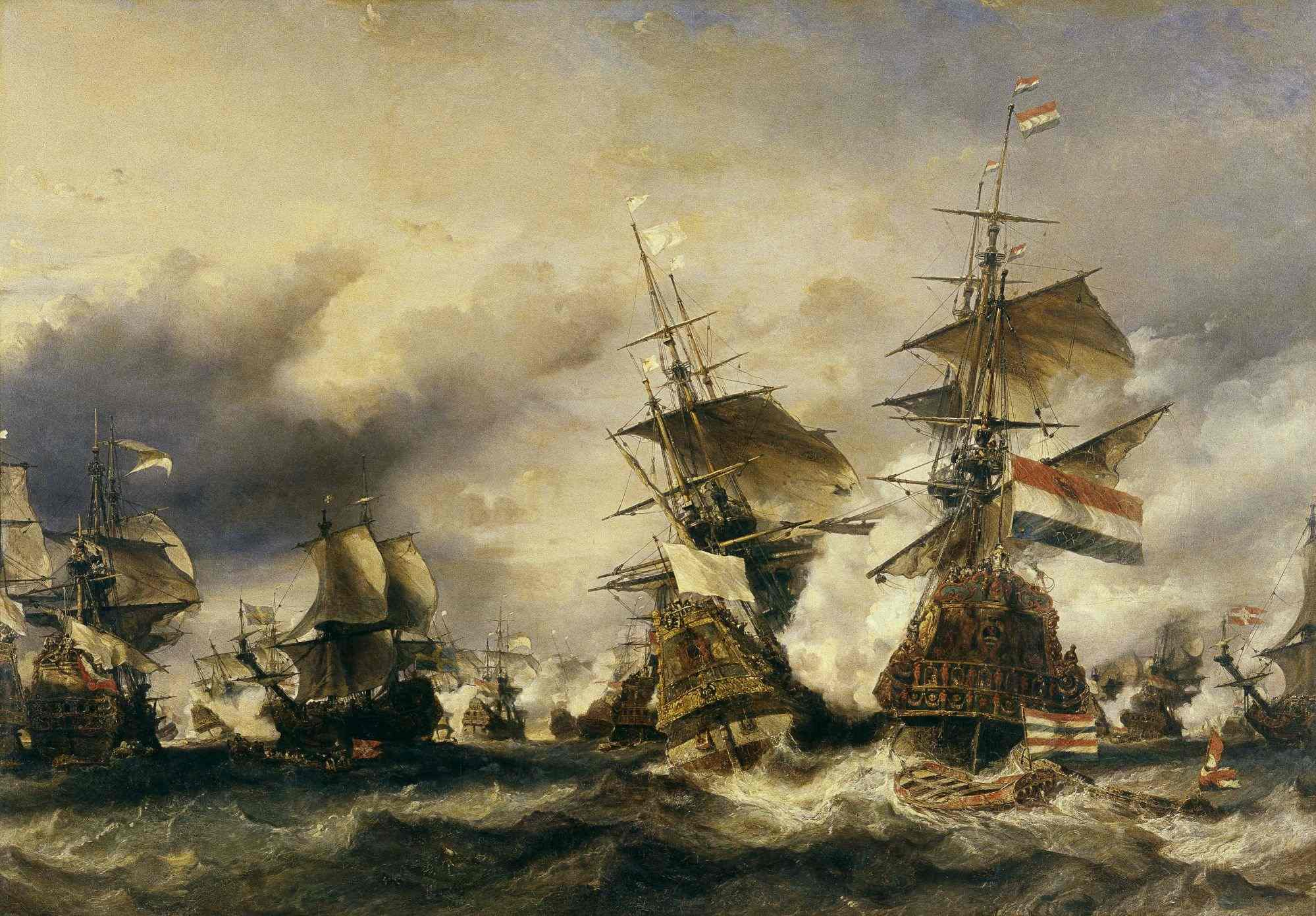
- The Battle of Texel by Eugène Isabey, 1839
- Born: December 22, 1645; Sexbierum
- Died: July 1, 1694 (aged 48); North Sea
- Relatives: Tjerk Hiddes de Vries
- Military career
- Allegiance: Dutch
- Rank: Commander
- Conflicts: Battle of Texel (DOW)

Hidde Sjoerds de Vries (22 December 1645 – 1 July 1694) was a Dutch States Navy officer like his uncle Tjerk Hiddes de Vries. During the Battle of Texel (1694), his ship was captured by the French and he died of his wounds.
