= Michel Jacobsen =

Flemish naval commander

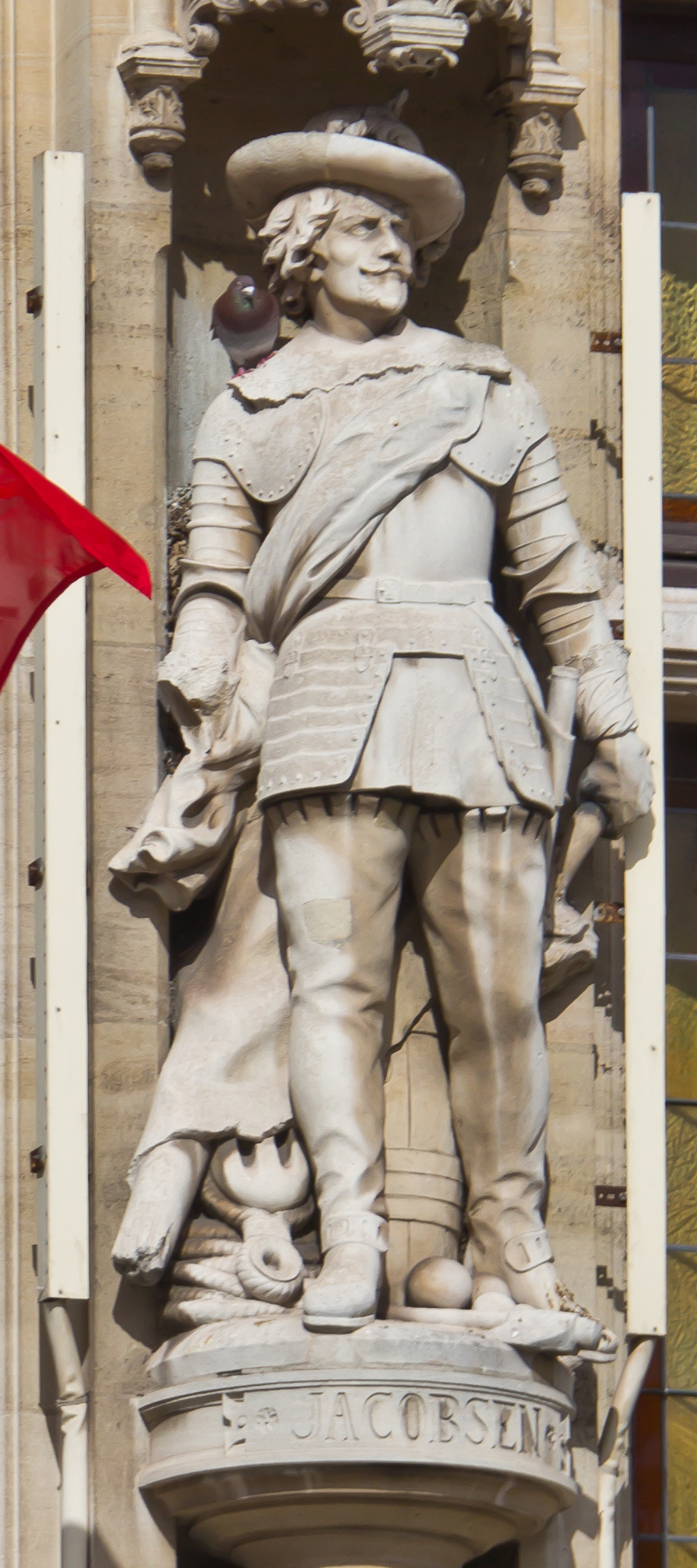
- Jacobsen's statue in the Town hall of Dunkirk.
- Born: 1560; Dunkirk
- Died: 1632 (aged 71–72); Sanlúcar de Barrameda
- Piratical career
- Nickname: The Sea Fox
- Type: Dunkirker
- Allegiance: Habsburg
- Rank: Captain
- Base of operations: Dunkirk
- Battles: Eighty Years' War

Michel Jacobsen (1560–1632) was a Flemish privateer and naval commander in the service of Spain. He was one of the most famous Dunkirkers.

== Biography ==
Son of captain Jan Jacobsen, he was born in a naval family. He started his career for private shipbuilders in 1582, and five years later he captained the ship La Mouette. He later served as a pilot in the failed Spanish Armada, which he helped bring back to Spain. By 1590, he was a privateer against the English and Dutch navies, which he harassed actively. He was nicknamed the "Sea Fox" (El Zorro de los Mares in Spanish, Le Renard des Mers in French and de Vos der zeeën in Dutch) for his ability to appear anywhere, destroy ships and vanish.

In the 1600s he was in the service of the governors of the Spanish Netherlands, Isabella Clara Eugenia and Albert of Austria. He was part of the Armada de Flandes in 1602, serving under Adrien Diericksen and Guillaume Janssen, and in 1609 he was in command of a fleet of newly built ships. The Twelve Years' Truce didn't lessened his services, and in 1624 he received the Order of Santiago from King Philip IV. In one of his best showings, he passed a fleet carrying men and money through the Dutch naval blockade with the help of the Spanish admiral in Flanders, Francisco de Ribera. Jacobsen and Ribera teamed up in a privateer campaign against the Dutch fishing fleet, destroying or capturing hundreds of ships.

In 1633, Jacobsen defeated an Ottoman fleet of ten ships with his only his three galleons, but some days later he died of illness at 78 in Sanlúcar de Barrameda. He was buried in the Seville Cathedral, with a Flemish legend claiming his tomb was close to those of Christopher Columbus and Hernán Cortés. He left ten children with Laurence Weis, daughter to fellow Dunkirker Cornelis Weus. One of them was Jan Jacobsen, who also had a tenure as a privateer, and Agnes Jacobsen, who became the grandmother of Dutch and French admiral Jean Bart.

== Bibliography ==
- Buti, Gilbert; Hrodej, Philippe (2013). Dictionnaire des corsaires et des pirates. CNRS. ISBN 978-2271080608.
- Stradling, Robert (2003). The Armada of Flanders: Spanish Maritime Policy and European War, 1568-1668. Cambridge University Press. ISBN 9780521525121.
- Villiers, Patrick (2000). Les Corsaires du littoral: Dunkerque, Calais, Boulogne: de Philippe II à Louis XIV: 1568-1713 (in French). Septentrion.
