= Baert =

Baert is a Flemish surname particularly common in the Belgian provinces of West and East Flanders. It may be patronymic ("son of Baert") (Bart), though "baert" is also an archaic spelling of Dutch "baard", meaning "beard", and may have referred to a person's appearance or profession as a barber. People with this surname include:

- Arthur Baert (1910–?), Belgian chess player
- Barbara Baert (born 1967), Belgian art historian
- Dirk Baert (born 1949), Belgian track cyclist
- Dominique Baert (born 1959), French Flemish politician
- François Baert (1651–1719), Belgian Jesuit hagiographer
- Frans Baert (1925–2022), Belgian lawyer and philosopher
- Jan Baert (1650–1702), Dunkerque corsair
- Jean-Pierre Baert (born 1951), Belgian racing cyclist
- Louis Baert (1903–1969), Belgian football referee
- Nand Baert (1932–1985), Belgian radio and television presenter
- Nicolas Baert (born 2001), Belgian racing driver
- Patrick Baert (born 1961), Belgian sociologist and social theorist
