= Loyola University Law School =

Loyola University School of Law may refer to:

- Loyola Law School, Los Angeles
- Loyola University Chicago School of Law
- Loyola University New Orleans College of Law
