= François Cornil Bart =

French naval officer (1677–1755)

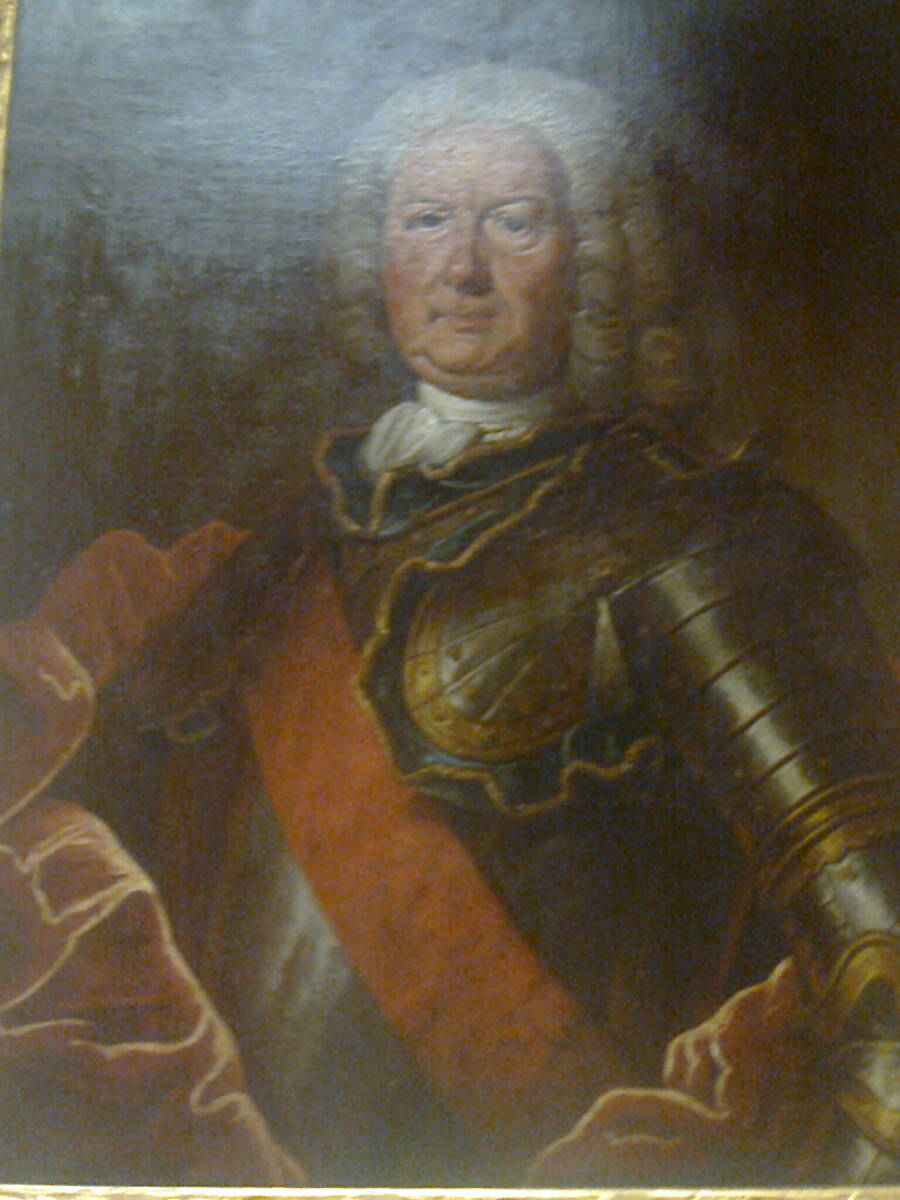
- Born: 16 June 1677; Dunkirk, French Flanders, France
- Died: 22 April 1755 (aged 77); Dunkirk, French Flanders, France
- Children: Philippe-François Bart
- Military career
- Allegiance: France
- Branch: Navy
- Rank: Vice admiral (vice-amiral)

François Cornil Bart (French pronunciation: [fʁɑ̃swa kɔʁnil baʁ]; 16 June 1677 – 22 April 1755) was a French naval officer who reached the rank of vice admiral. He was the son of the famous privateer Jean Bart.

== Family ==
François Cornil Bart was the oldest of four children of Jean Bart and his first wife, Nicole Gontier of Dunkirk. His father was an illiterate fisherman from Dunkirk who had risen through the ranks of the navy to become chef d'escadre. François Cornil was born in Dunkirk on 16 June 1677. He married Marie Vignereux, by whom he had several children, including Philippe-François Bart, who became a chef d'escadre in the navy, and Gaspard-François Bart, who became a colonel chef de brigade in the army.

== Early years ==
François Cornil Bart went to sea in 1688 at the age of 11 on his father's ship. In April 1689 he sailed under his father on La Railleuse, escorting a munitions convoy to Brest, accompanied by Claude de Forbin. They encountered a Dutch privateer on 1 May 1689, which they chased down and boarded. Forbin relates that when the engagement began, Jean Bart thought his son showed a sign of fear, and tied him to the main mast for the duration of the fight to accustom him to defying danger. During his career, he would take part in nineteen boardings, eleven with his father, and eight after his father died.

François Cornil Bart became a garde-marine on 1 January 1692. Jean Bart was ennobled in August 1694 by letters signed by King Louis XIV and countersigned by Louis Phélypeaux. This gave Francois-Cornil the right to call himself the Chevalier Bart. François Cornil dissociated himself from a cousin named Jean Bart, a simple sailor, before his father died on 27 April 1702 . As he rose in the navy he cut his ties with his cousins, who were tailors, coopers, carpenters, sailors and fishmongers, and tried to behave as a true gentleman.

== Naval officer ==
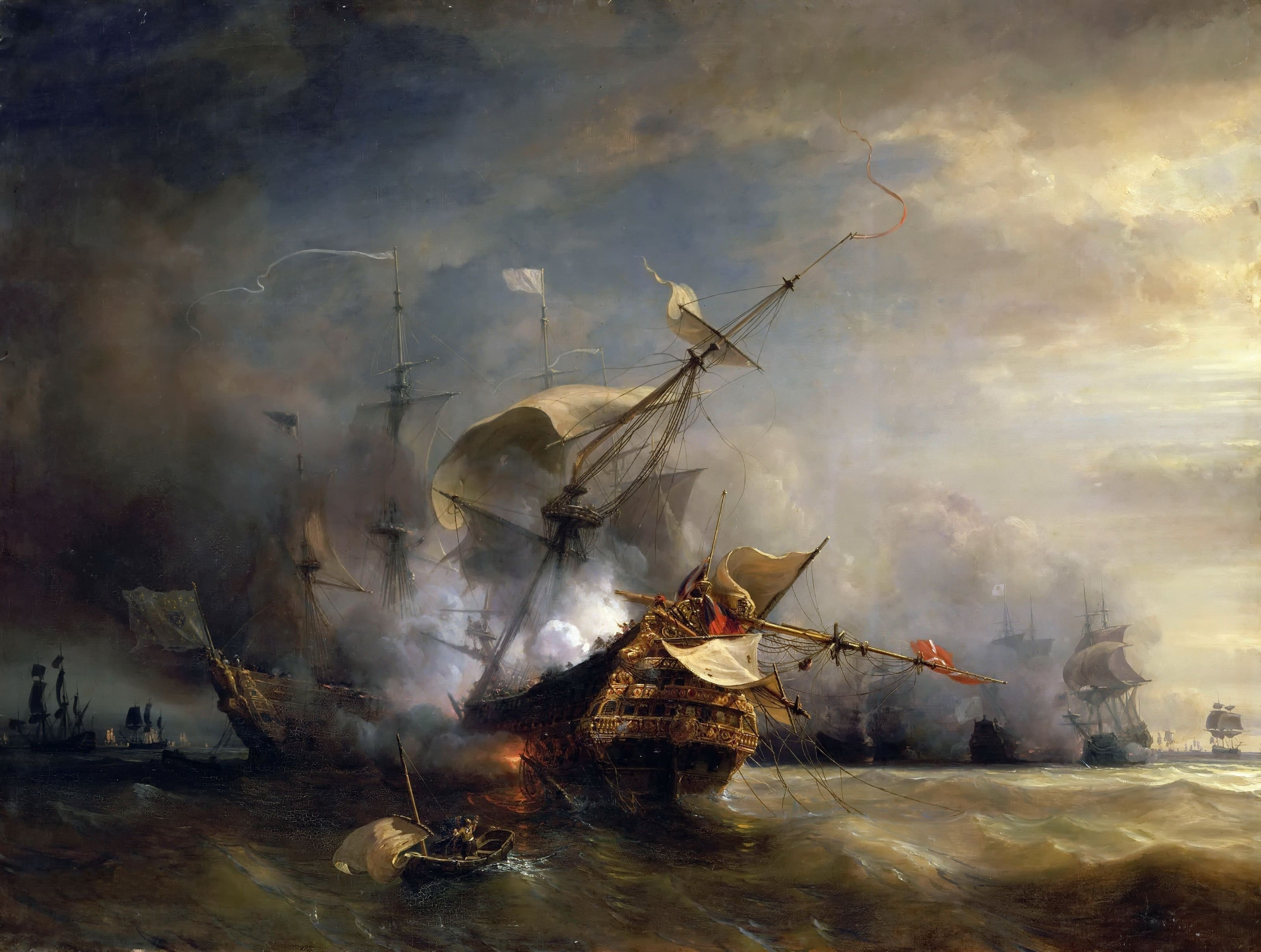
Battle at The Lizard 21 October 1707

François Cornil Bart was in turn ship-of-the-line lieutenant (lieutenant de vaisseau) and frigate captain (capitaine de frégate). He was second in command to Forbin on 2 October 1706 in a fierce battle near Hamburg when the French took many merchantmen escorted by six Dutch vessels. On 23 November 1712 he was promoted to ship-of-the-line captain (capitaine de vaisseau). When Peter the Great visited Paris in May 1717 the court of Versaille ordered Cornil Bart to accompany the Tsar from Calais to Paris, where he stayed as long as the Russian emperor remained. On 20 June 1718 King Louis XV made him a knight of the Order of Saint Louis.

On 1 May 1741 Fr.-Corn. Bart, then one of the oldest captains, was raised to the rank of chef d'escadre on the recommendation of Louis Jean Marie de Bourbon, Duke of Penthièvre, Admiral of France. On 7 February 1750 he was made lieutenant-general of the naval armies under the minister Antoine Louis Rouillé. He was promoted to vice admiral of Ponant on 1 September 1752. At that time there were two vice admirals, Levant in charge of the ports and ships in the Mediterranean, and Ponant in charge of the French ports and fleets of the ocean. On 23 August 1753 he received the grand cross of the Order of Saint Louis.

Bart died on 22 April 1755 at the age of 78. He is buried with his father in the Église Saint-Eloi in Dunkirk. When his widow applied for a pension it was granted immediately, which was unusual at that time.

== Sources ==
- Herter, Solange Batsell (22 February 2011), No More Tiaras: (A Memoir of Eight Decades), Xlibris Corporation, ISBN 978-1-4500-4173-7
- Jal, Augustin (1867), "Bart (François Cornil", Dictionnaire critique de biographie et d'histoire: errata et supplément pour tous les dictionnaires historiques (in French)}
- J.H. (1867), "Dunkirk", The Builder
- Lebleu, Adolphe (1870), Étude sur Jean-Bart: son influence - son époque (in French), Kien
- Marzagalli, Silvia; Bonin, Hubert (2000), Négoce, ports et océans, XVIe-XXe siècles: mélanges offerts à Paul Butel, Presses Univ de Bordeaux, ISBN 978-2-86781-247-7
- Oelke, K. F. (11 June 2019), Louis XIV and the Land of Love and Adventure: 1700 to 1715, K. F. Oelke, GGKEY:7LE19ZC2BSJ
