= Huyghe =

Huyghe or Huyghé may refer to:

- Huyghe Brewery, a Belgian brewery founded in 1906

== People ==
- Armand Huyghé (1871–1944), Belgian career soldier
- Carlo Huyghé (1923–2016), Belgian soldier and politician
- Gérard-Maurice Eugène Huyghe (1909–2001), French Catholic Bishop
- Pierre Huyghe (born 1962), French contemporary artist
- René Huyghe (1906–1997), French writer
- Sébastien Huyghe (born 1969), French politician
