= Jean Bart =

French admiral and privateer (1650–1702)

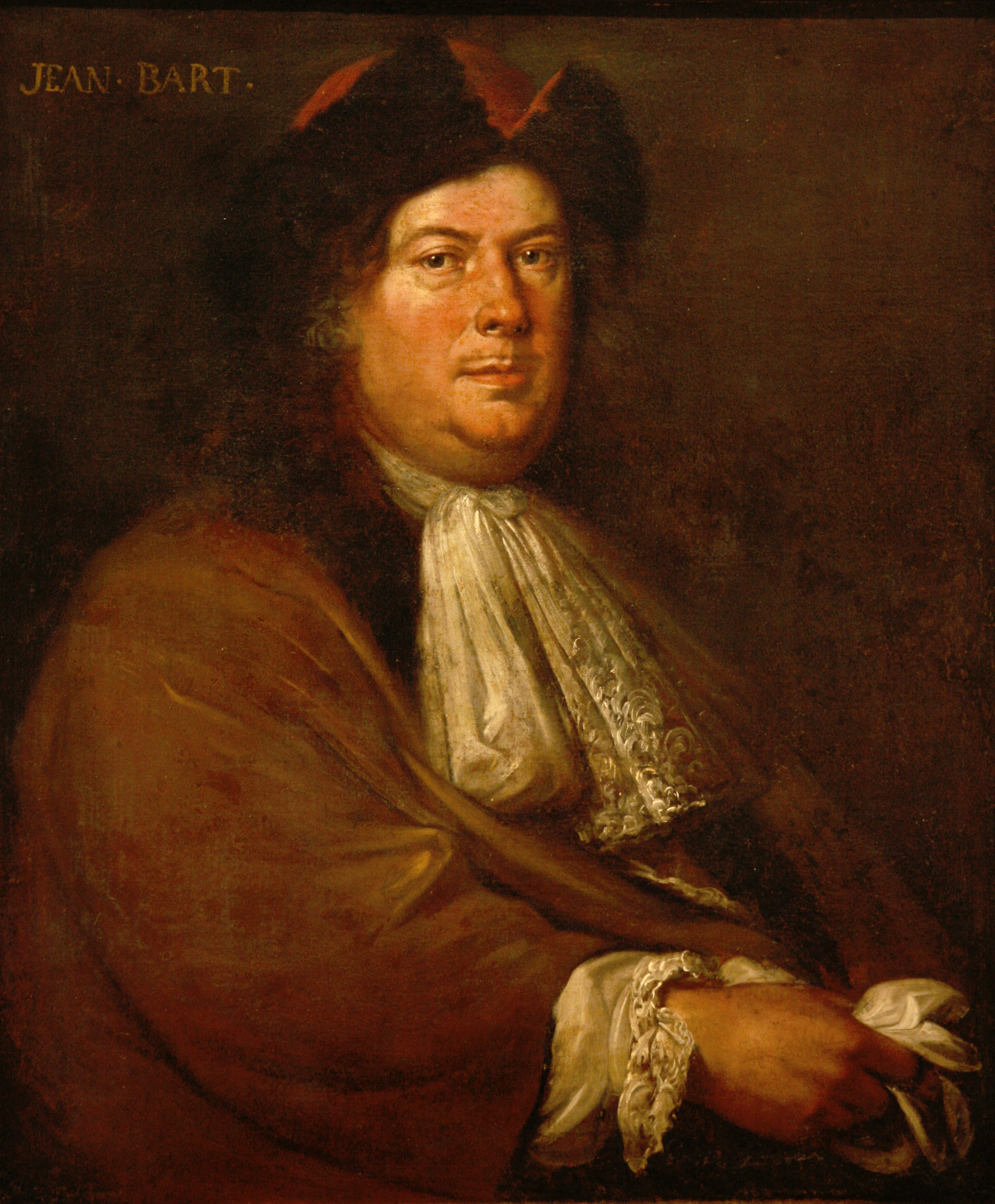
- Portrait by Mathieu Elias
- Born: Jan Baert; 21 October 1650; Dunkirk
- Died: 27 April 1702 (aged 51) Dunkirk
- Allegiance: Dutch Republic (1662–1672); Kingdom of France (1672–1697)
- Service years: 1672–1697
- Rank: Admiral
- Conflicts: Nine Years' War: Battle of Beachy Head; Battle of Texel; Battle of Dogger Bank
- Awards: Chevalier of the Order of Saint Louis

Jean Bart (French pronunciation: [ʒɑ̃ baʁ]; Dutch: Jan Baert; 21 October 1650 – 27 April 1702) was a Franco-Flemish naval commander and privateer.

== Early life ==
Jean Bart was born in Dunkirk in 1650 to a seafaring family, the son of Jean-Cornil Bart (c. 1619–1668) who has been described variously as a fisherman or corsair commander sailing for the Dutch Republic. His grandfather, Cornil Weus(fr), was a vice-admiral and fought the Dutch on behalf of Spain at the beginning of the Eighty Years' War. His great-grandfather, Michel Jacobsen, distinguished himself in the service of the Spanish crown, bringing back the Invincible Armada after its failed attempt to invade England in 1588, and was appointed vice-admiral by Philip IV of Spain. His great-uncle, Jan Jacobsen, also in the service of Spain, blew himself up with his ship in 1622 rather than surrender. He almost certainly spoke Dutch, at that time the native language in the region, and his birth name was Jan Baert.

== Naval career ==
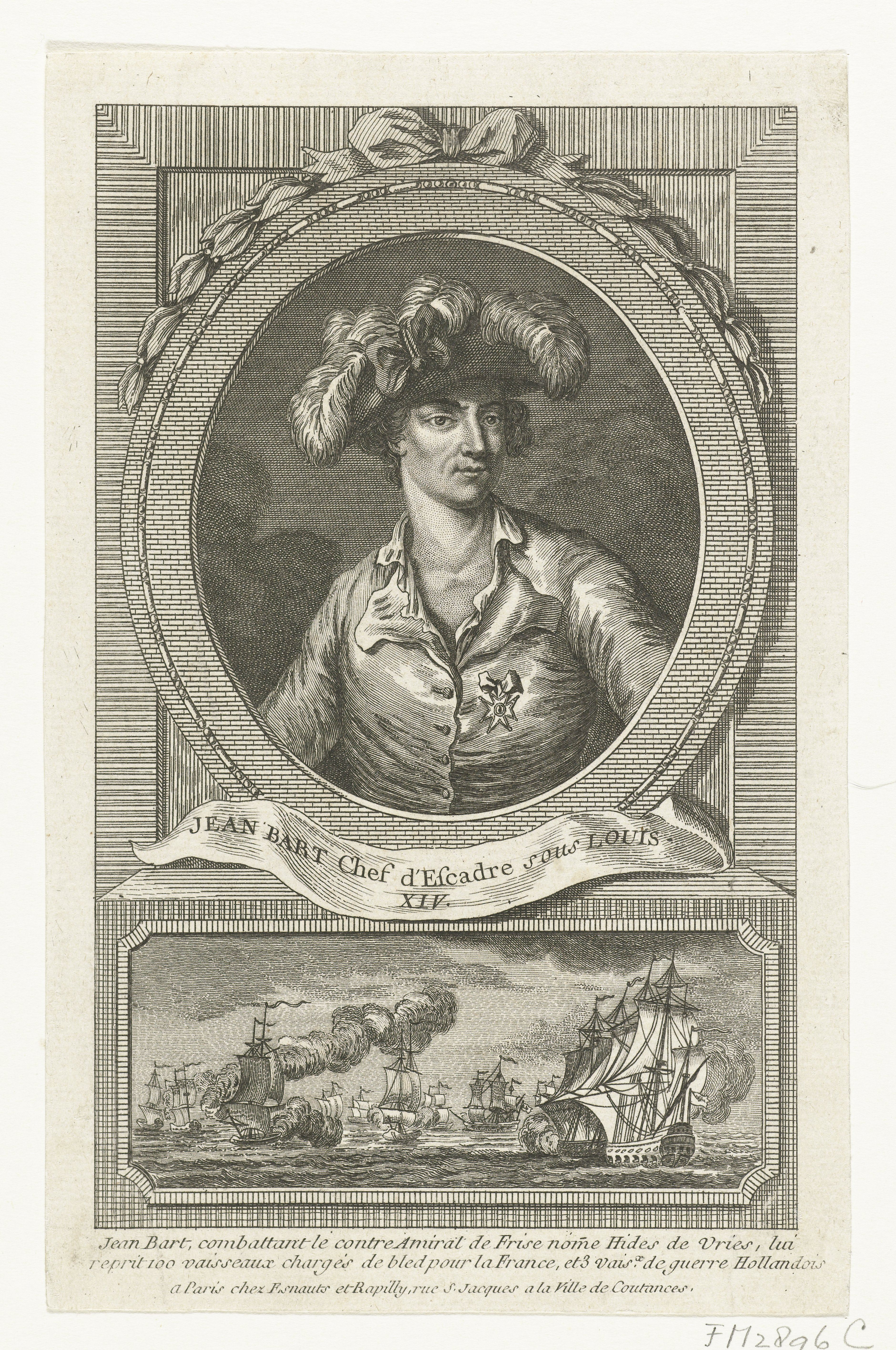
1700s Dutch engraving of Jean Bart and the Battle of Texel (1694)

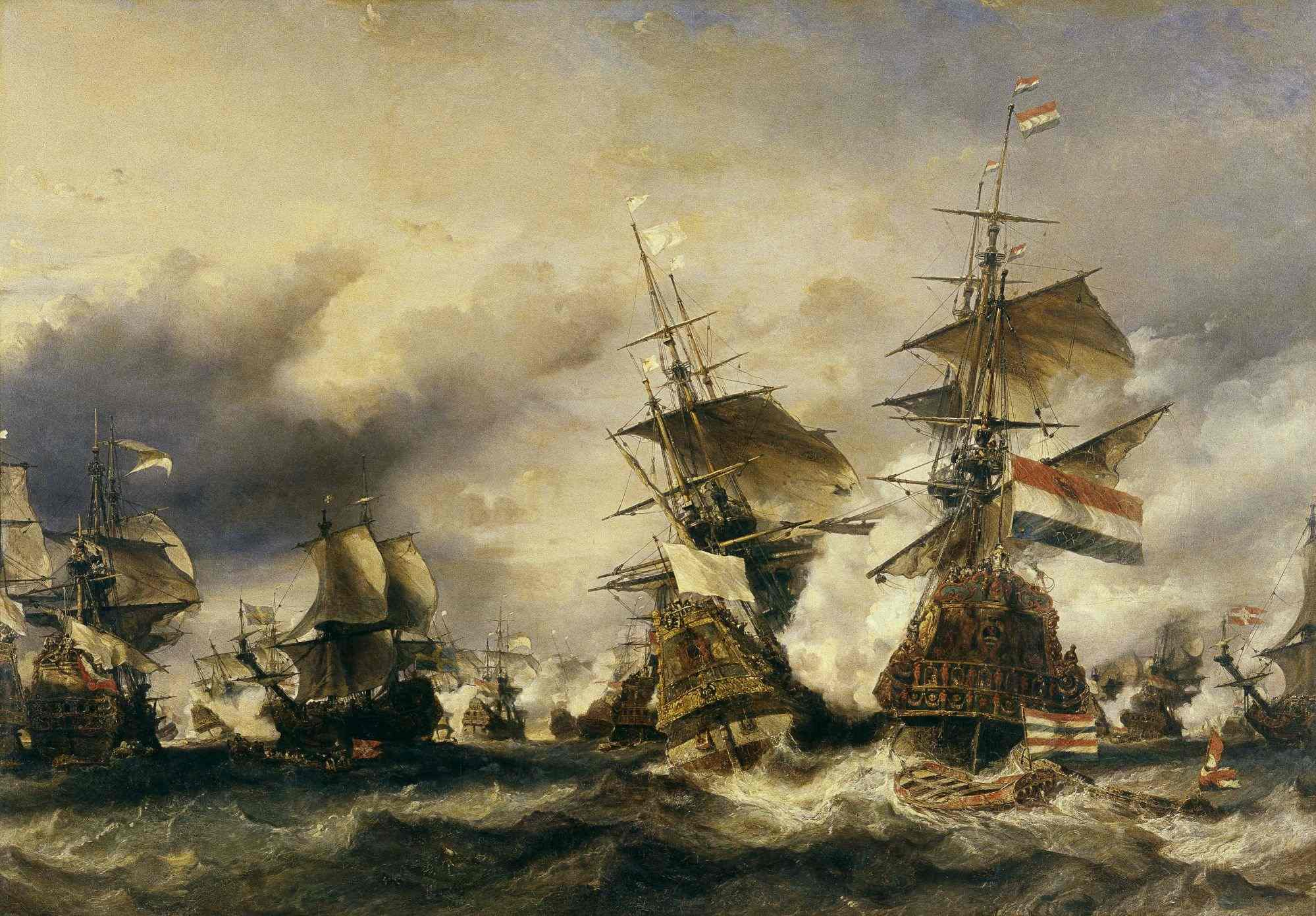
The Battle of Texel by Eugène Isabey, 1839

When he was young, Bart served in the Dutch navy under Admiral Michiel de Ruyter. When war broke out between France and the United Provinces in 1672, he entered the French service. Since only persons of noble birth could then serve as officers in the navy, he instead became captain of one of the Dunkirk privateers. In that capacity, he displayed such astonishing bravery that Louis XIV sent him on a special mission to the Mediterranean, where he gained great distinction.

Unable to receive a command in the navy because of his low birth, he held an irregular sort of commission, but he had such success that he became a lieutenant in 1679. He became a terror to the Dutch navy and a serious menace to the commerce of Holland. On one occasion, with six vessels, he broke through a blockading fleet, shattered a number of the enemy's ships and convoyed a transport of grain safely into Dunkirk harbor. He rose rapidly to the rank of captain and then to that of admiral.

He achieved his greatest successes during the Nine Years' War (1688–1697).

- In 1689, at the beginning of the war, he was captured by an English warship, together with Claude de Forbin, and they were taken as prisoners-of-war to Plymouth. However, three days later, they succeeded in escaping to Brittany in a rowboat, together with 20 other captured sailors.
- In 1691, he slipped through the blockade of Dunkirk, terrorised the allied merchant fleet and burnt a Scottish castle and four villages.
- In 1693, he commanded the 62-gun ship Le Glorieux under marshal de Tourville. After the brilliant battle of Lagos and the capture of the "Smyrna convoy", he left the fleet and near Faro he met six Dutch ships of 24 to 50 guns, all richly loaded, he forced them to run aground, and then burned them.
- In 1694, he achieved his greatest success at the Battle of Texel in which he captured a huge convoy of Dutch grain ships, saving Paris from starvation. He was raised into the nobility on 4 August 1694 with a peerage.
- In 1696, he struck another blow against the Dutch in the Battle of Dogger Bank.

The Peace of Ryswick in 1697 put an end to his active service.

== Marriage and children ==
He married the 16-year-old Nicole Gontier on 3 February 1676. They had four children before Nicole died in 1682. Their oldest son, François Cornil Bart (1676-1755), became vice-admiral.

Then he married Jacoba Tugghe on 13 October 1689. They had ten children. He signed his marriage contract, which is still on file in Dunkirk, with the name "Jan Baert".

Jean Bart died of pleurisy and is buried in the Eglise Saint-Eloi in Dunkirk.

== Legacy ==
Many anecdotes tell of the courage and bluntness of the uncultivated sailor, who became a popular hero of the French Navy. He captured a total of 386 ships and also sank or burned a great number more. The town of Dunkirk has honoured his memory by erecting a statue and by naming a public square after him. During the carnival of Dunkirk, held every year the Sunday before Holy Tuesday, local people kneel all together in front of his statue and sing the Cantate à Jean Bart. Jean Bart is viewed by the inhabitants of Dunkirk as a local hero. During the interwar period, in 1928, following excavations carried out in the church, Dr. Louis Lemaire found the bones of Jean Bart, which makes it possible to estimate his size, 1.90 m.

In World War II, 70% of Dunkirk was destroyed, but the statue survived.

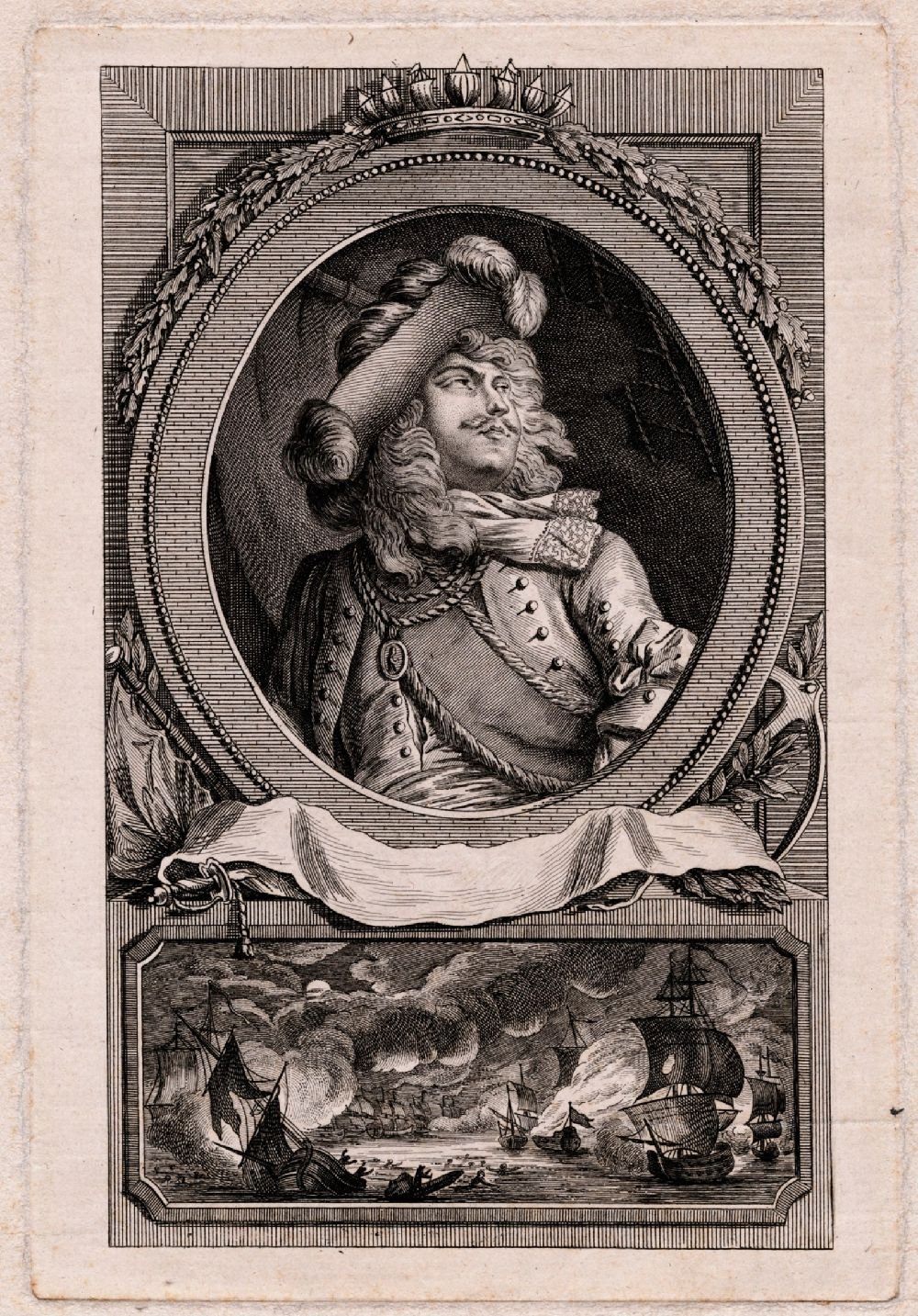
Anonymous Flanders, Jean Bart, late 1700s, engraving

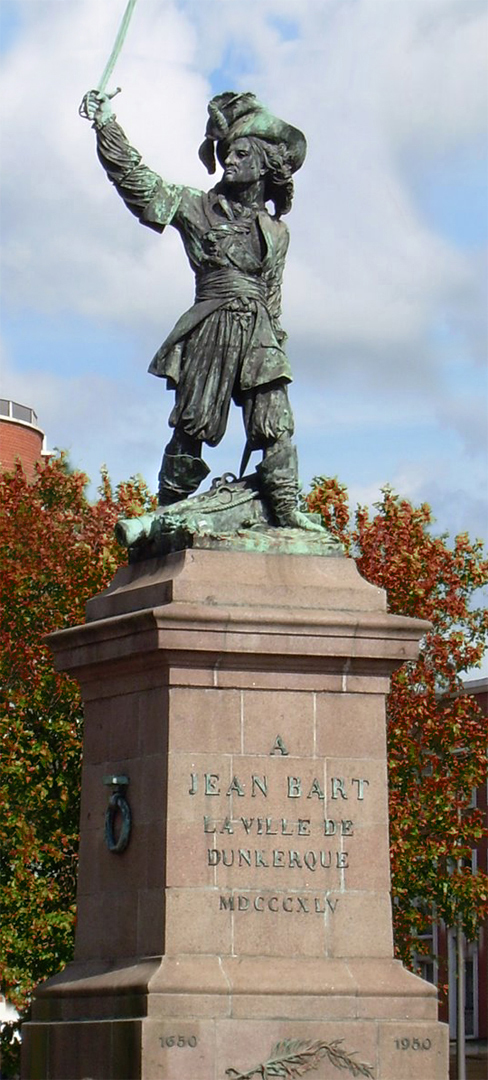
Statue of Jean Bart in Dunkirk

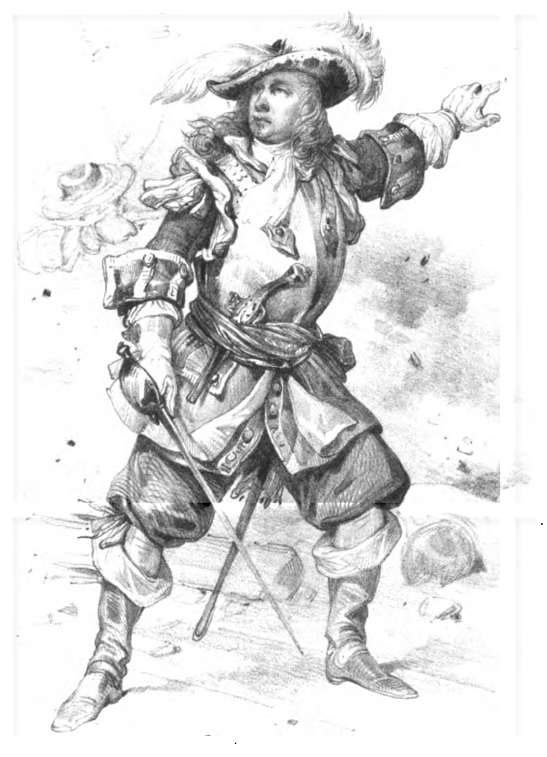
Jean Bart as depicted in 1845

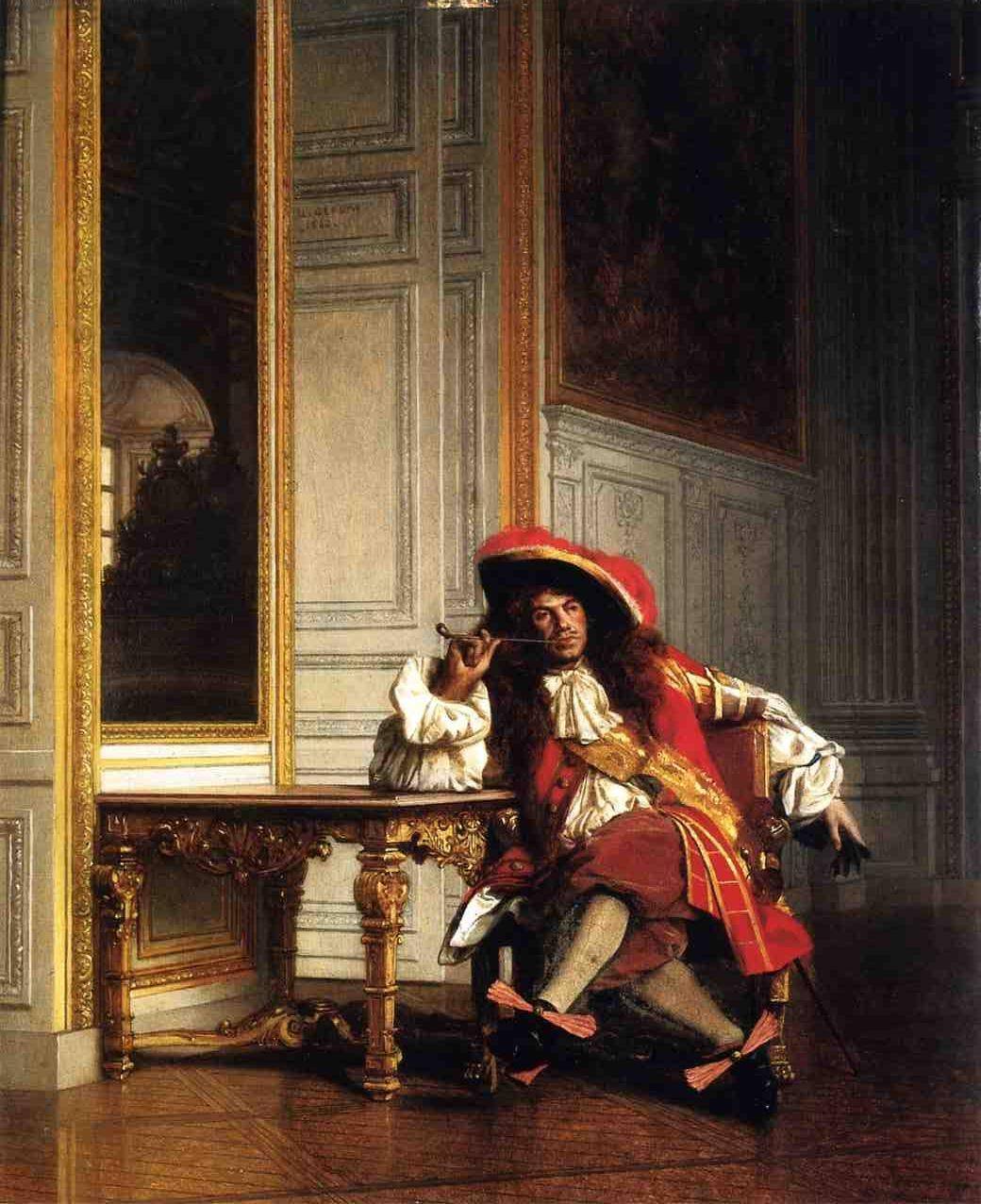
Painting of Jean Bart by Jean-Léon Gérôme (1862)

=== Ships bearing the name Jean Bart ===
More than 27 ships of the French Navy, over a period of 200 years, have borne the name Jean Bart. These include:

- Jean Bart (1788) – 74-gun ship of the line
- Jean Bart (1811) – 74-gun ship of the line
- Jean Bart (1886) – First class cruiser of 4800 tonnes
- Jean Bart (1910) – 23,600 tonne battleship; the first French Dreadnought
- Jean Bart (1940) – 50,000 tonne battleship armed with 380mm guns. Although launched in 1940, the ship was not fitted out and completed until 1955, having spent much of World War II in dock at Casablanca; the last French battleship completed
- Jean Bart (1988) – Anti-aircraft frigate, decommissioned in August 2021.

Many smaller naval ships as well as privateers have also borne the name "Jean Bart".

=== Commercial products branded Jean Bart ===
- Jean Bart shoe polish
- Jean Barth Dutch cigarette tobacco

=== Jean Bart in popular culture ===
- Jean Bart appears as a character in the Baroque Cycle by Neal Stephenson.
- In the manga One Piece a slave turned pirate is named after Jean Bart.
- The Chinese smartphone game Azur Lane features a female character with a name and personality inspired by Jean Bart and the French battleship Jean Bart (1940).
- The name Jean Bart is also a frequently used name for sea scouting groups.
- The book Het Eerste Litteken ("The first scar") by Flemish writer Johan Ballegeer is an adaptation of Jan Baert's life story.
- Jean Bart is the pseudonym (pen name) of Romanian novelist Eugeniu Botez.
