= Aviation =

Activities surrounding aircraft industry

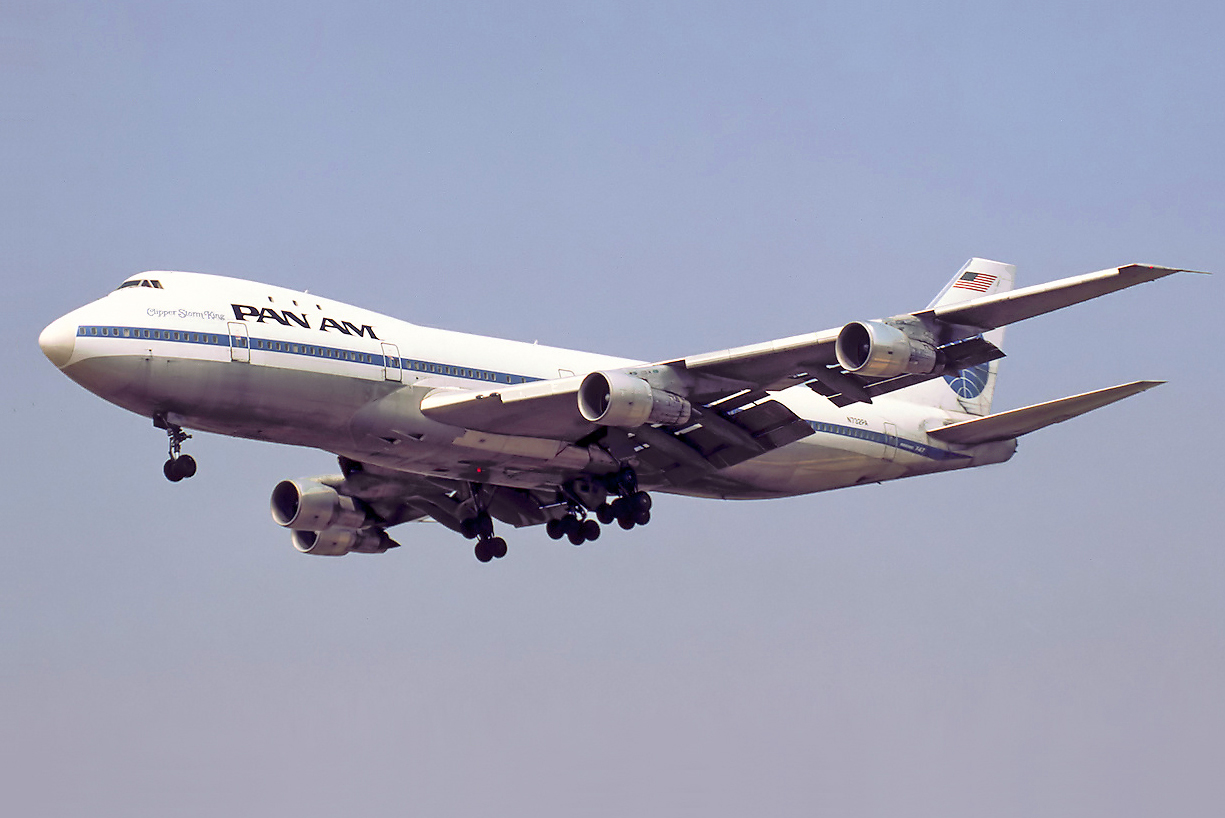
A Boeing 747 in 1978 operated by Pan Am

Aviation includes the activities surrounding mechanical flight and the aircraft industry. Aircraft include fixed-wing and rotary-wing types, morphable wings, wing-less lifting bodies, as well as lighter-than-air aircraft such as hot air balloons and airships.

Aviation began in the 18th century with the development of the hot air balloon, an apparatus capable of atmospheric displacement through buoyancy. Clément Ader built the "Ader Éole" in France and made an uncontrolled, powered hop in 1890. This was the first powered aircraft, although it did not achieve controlled flight. Some of the most significant advancements in aviation technology came with the controlled gliding flying of Otto Lilienthal in 1896. A major leap followed with the construction of the Wright Flyer, the first powered airplane by the Wright brothers in the early 1900s.

Since that time, aviation has been technologically revolutionized by the introduction of the jet engine which enabled aviation to become a major form of transport throughout the world. In 2024, there were 9.5 billion passengers worldwide according to the ICAO. As of 2018, estimates suggest that 11% of the world's population traveled by air, with up to 4% taking international flights.

== Etymology ==
The word aviation was coined by the French writer and former naval officer Gabriel de La Landelle in 1863. He originally derived the term from the verb avier (an unsuccessful neologism for "to fly"), itself derived from the Latin word avis ("bird") and the suffix -ation.

He coined the term in his 1863 book, "Aviation ou Navigation aérienne sans ballons" ("Aviation or Aerial Navigation without Balloons").

== History ==
=== Early beginnings ===
There are early legends of human flight such as the stories of Icarus in Greek myth, Jamshid and Shah Kay Kāvus in Persian myth, and the flying automaton of Archytas of Tarentum (428–347 BC). Later, somewhat more credible claims of short-distance human flights appear, such as the winged flights of Abbas ibn Firnas (810–887, recorded in the 17th century), Eilmer of Malmesbury (11th century, recorded in the 12th century) and the hot-air Passarola of Bartholomeu Lourenço de Gusmão (1685–1724).

=== Lighter than air ===
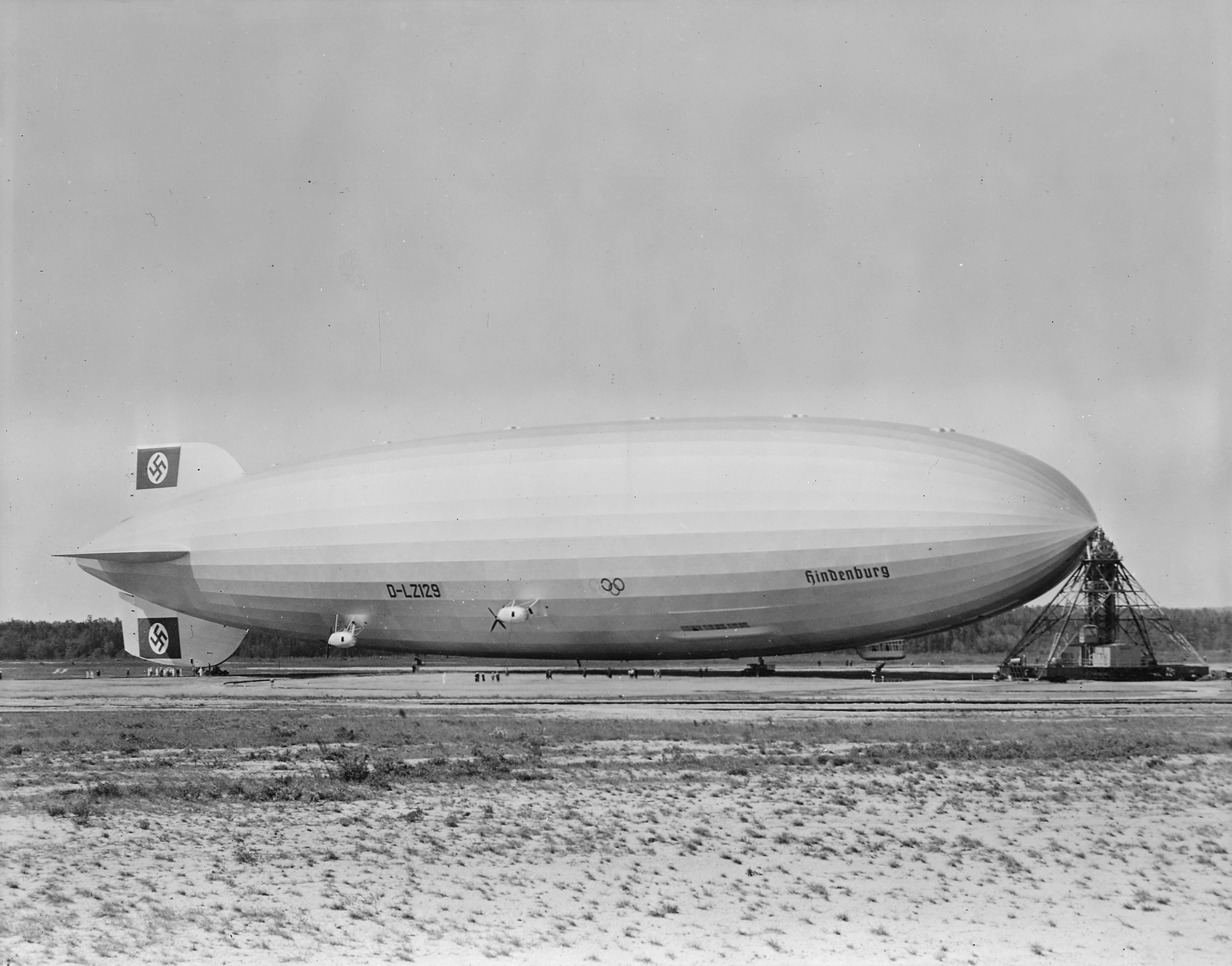
LZ 129 Hindenburg at Lakehurst Naval Air Station, 1936

The modern age of aviation began with the first untethered human lighter-than-air flight on November 21, 1783, of a hot air balloon designed by the Montgolfier brothers. The usefulness of balloons was limited because they could only travel downwind. The first steerable dirigible, balloon was flown by Jean-Pierre Blanchard in 1784. It was human-powered and, Blanchard completed a successful crossing of the English Channel in one in 1785.

Rigid airships became the first aircraft to transport passengers and cargo over great distances. The best-known aircraft of this type were manufactured by the German Zeppelin company.

The most successful Zeppelin was the Graf Zeppelin. It flew over one million miles, including an around-the-world flight in August 1929. However, the dominance of the Zeppelins over the airplanes of that period, which had a range of only a few hundred miles, was diminishing as airplane design advanced. The era of passenger airships ended on May 6, 1937 when the Hindenburg caught fire, killing 36 people. The cause of the accident has been debated ever since. Several investigations concluded a spark ignited leaking flammable hydrogen lifting gas. An internal investigation by the manufacturer found that the coating used in the material covering the frame was highly flammable and allowed static electricity to build up in the airship. Changes to the coating formulation reduced the risk of subsequent accidents. Although there have been periodic initiatives to revive their use, airships have seen only niche application since that time. There had been previous airship accidents that were more fatal, for instance, a British R38 on 23 August 1921, but the Hindenburg was the first to be captured on newsreel.

=== Heavier than air ===
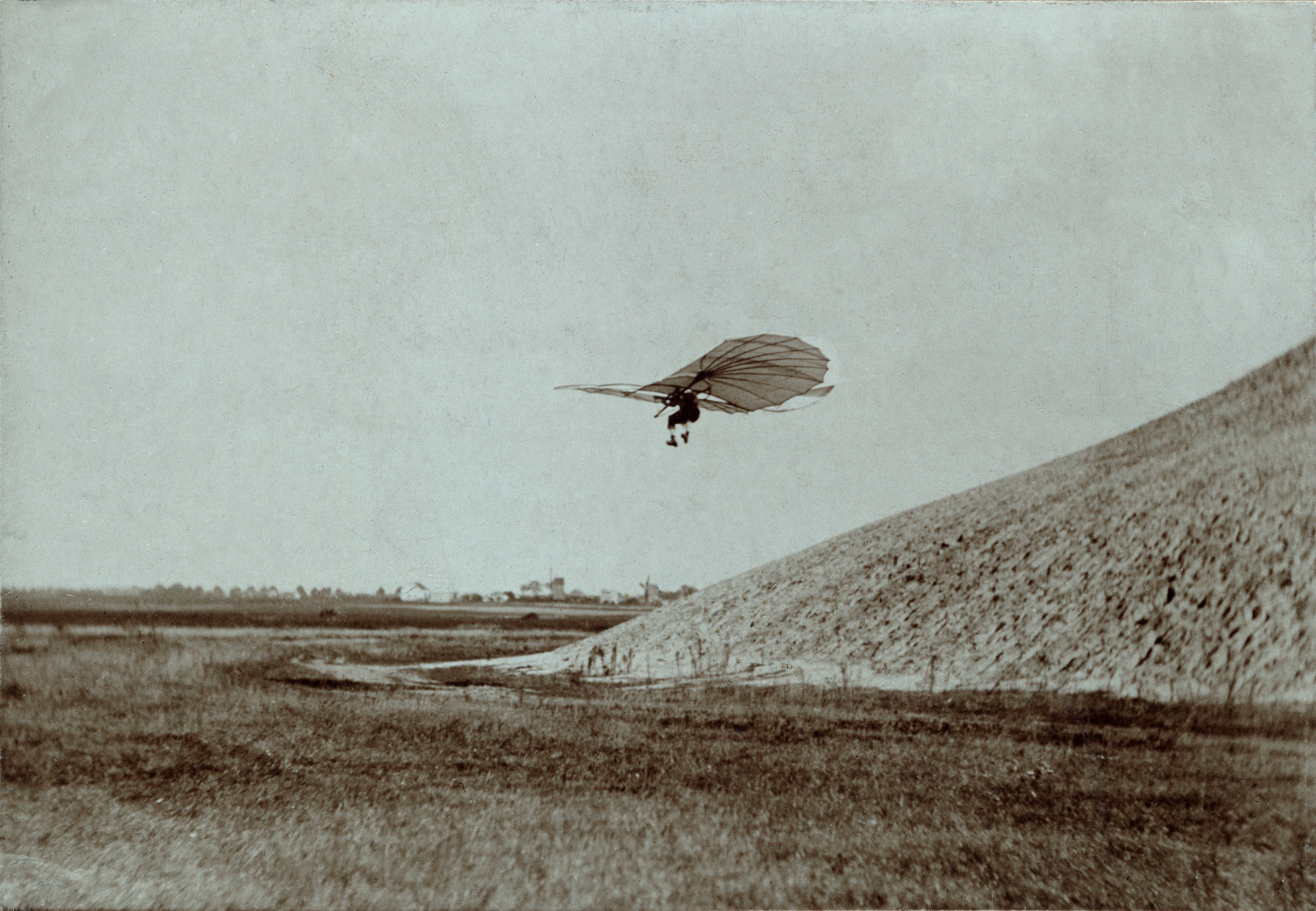
Lilienthal in mid-flight, Berlin c. 1895.

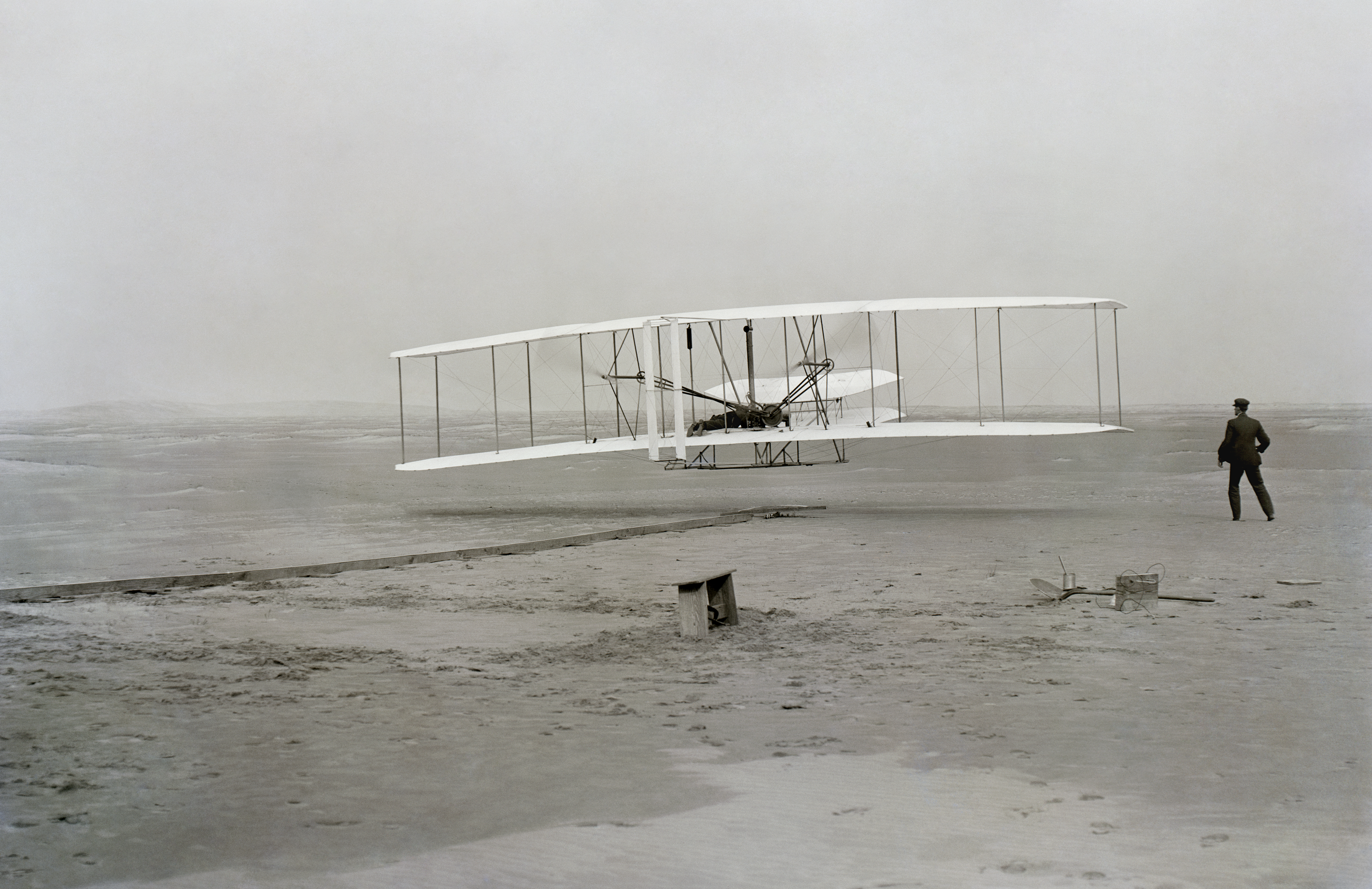
First powered and controlled flight by the Wright brothers, December 17, 1903.

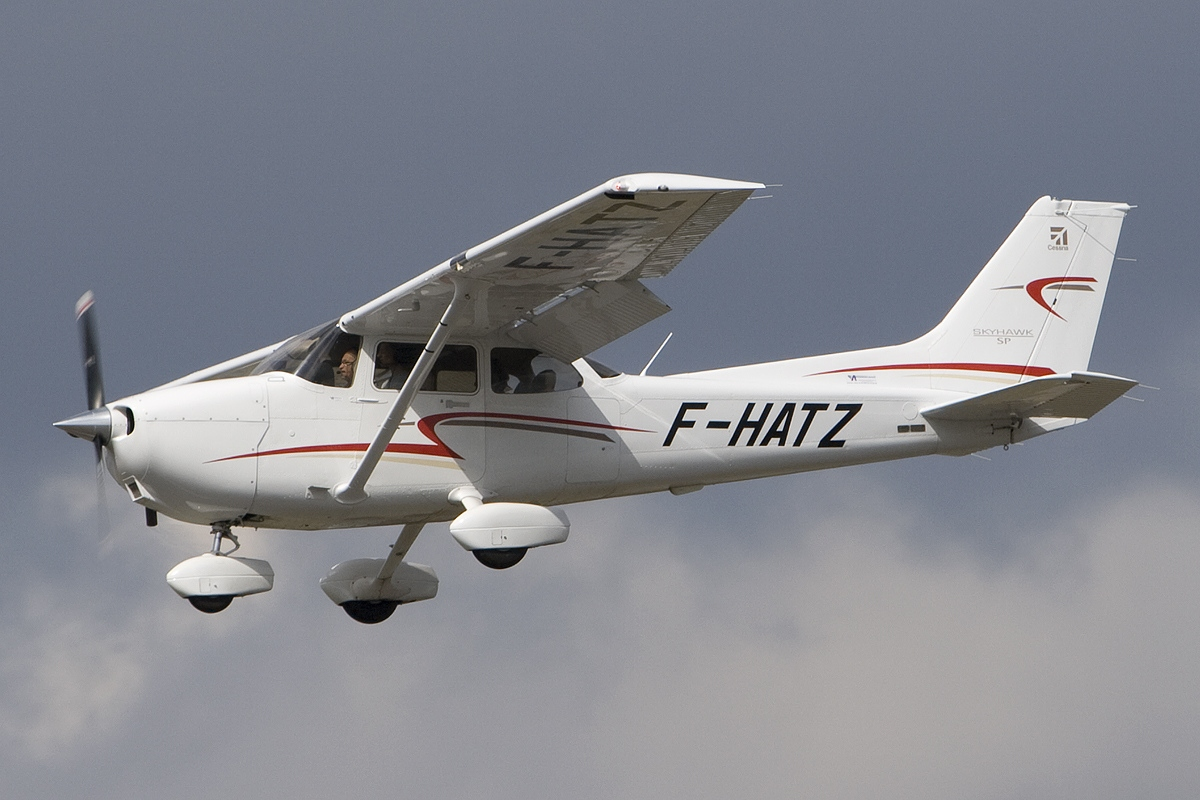
The Cessna 172 is the most produced aircraft in history.

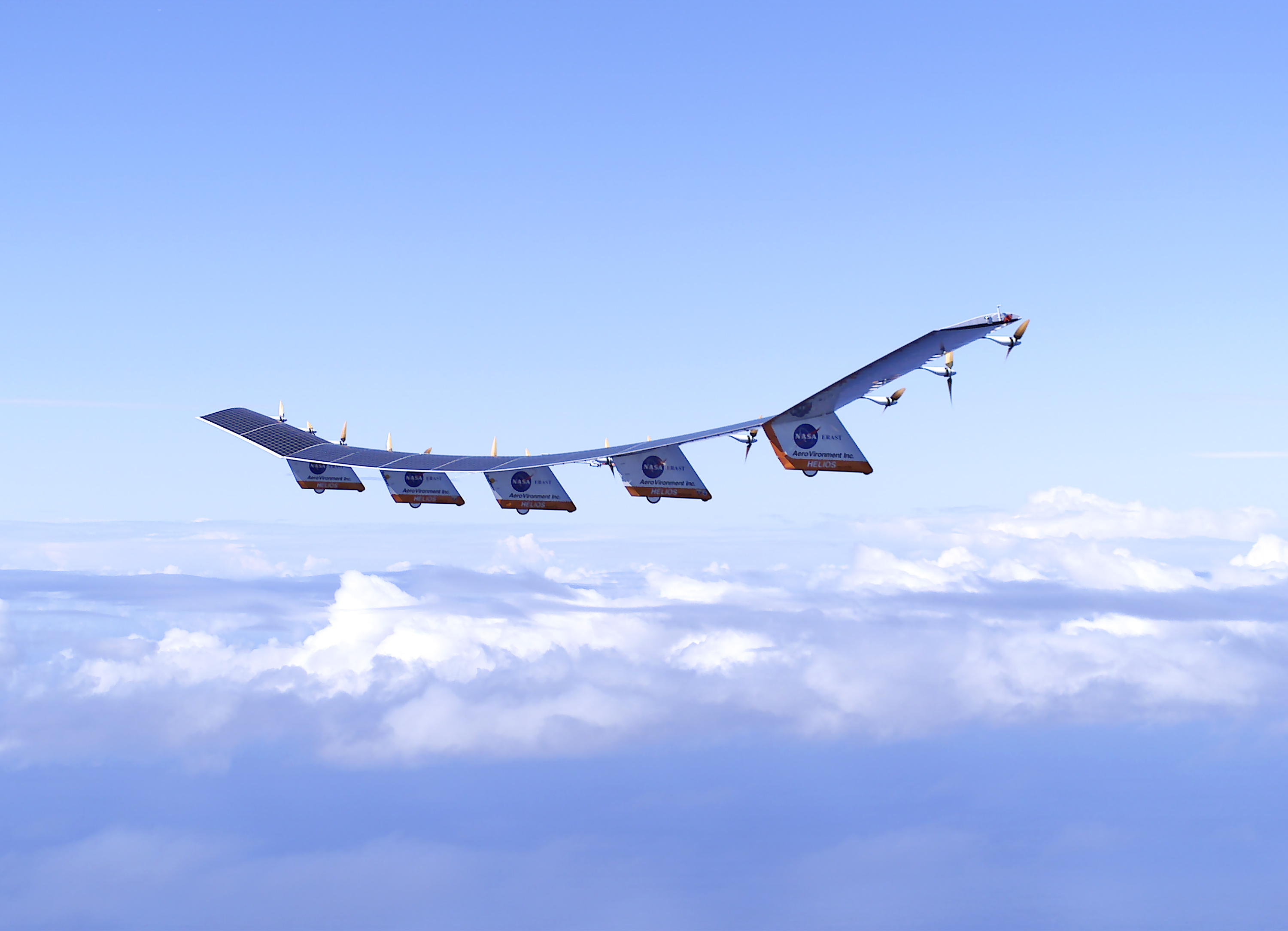
NASA's Helios researches solar powered flight.

In 1799, Sir George Cayley set forth the concept of the modern airplane as a fixed-wing flying machine with separate systems for lift, propulsion and control.

Otto Lilienthal was the first person to make well-documented, repeated, successful flights with gliders, therefore making the idea of "heavier than air" a reality. Newspapers and magazines published photographs of Lilienthal gliding, favorably influencing public and scientific opinion about the possibility of flying machines becoming practical. Lilienthal's work led him to develop the concept of the modern wing. His flight attempts in Berlin in 1891 are seen as the beginning of human flight and the Lilienthal Normalsegelapparat is considered to be the first airplane in series production, making the Maschinenfabrik Otto Lilienthal in Berlin the first air plane production company in the world. Lilienthal is often referred to as either the "father of aviation" or "father of flight".

The late 19th and early 20th centuries saw dirigible developments, such as Henri Giffard's included machine-powered propulsion Giffard dirigible in 1852, David Schwarz' rigid frame dirigible in 1896 and Alberto Santos-Dumont's improvements to speed and maneuverability in 1901.

There are many competing claims for the earliest powered, heavier-than-air flight. The first recorded powered flight was carried out by Clément Ader on October 9, 1890, in his bat-winged, fully self-propelled fixed-wing aircraft, the Ader Éole. It was reportedly the first manned, powered, heavier-than-air flight of a significant distance of 50 meters (160 ft), but insignificant altitude from level ground. Seven years later, on October 14, 1897, Ader's Avion III was tested without success in front of two officials from the French War ministry. The report on the trials was not publicized until 1910, as they had been a military secret. In November 1906, Ader said that he made a successful flight on October 14, 1897 and achieved an uninterrupted flight of around 300 meters (980 feet). Although widely believed at the time, these claims were later discredited.

The Wright brothers made the first successful powered, controlled and sustained airplane flight on December 17, 1903, a feat made possible by their invention of three-axis control and in-house development of an engine with a sufficient power-to-weight ratio. A decade later, at the start of World War I, heavier-than-air powered aircraft had become practical for reconnaissance, artillery spotting and attacks against ground positions.

Aircraft began to transport people and cargo as designs grew larger and more reliable. The Wright brothers took aloft the first passenger, Charles Furnas, one of their mechanics, on May 14, 1908.

During the 1920s and 1930s great progress was made in the field of aviation, including the first transatlantic flight of Alcock and Brown in 1919, Charles Lindbergh's solo transatlantic flight in 1927 and Charles Kingsford Smith's transpacific flight the following year. One of the most successful designs of this period was the Douglas DC-3, which became the first airliner to be profitable carrying passengers exclusively, starting the modern era of passenger airline service. By the beginning of World War II, many towns and cities had built airports, and there were numerous qualified pilots available. During World War II one of the first jet engines was developed by Hans von Ohain and accomplished the world's first jet-powered flight in 1939. The war brought many innovations to aviation, including the first jet aircraft and the first liquid-fueled rockets.

After World War II, especially in North America, there was a boom in general aviation, both private and commercial, as thousands of pilots were released from military service and many inexpensive war-surplus transport and training aircraft became available. Manufacturers such as Cessna, Piper, and Beechcraft expanded production to provide light aircraft for the new middle-class market.

By the 1950s, the development of civil jets grew, beginning with the de Havilland Comet, though the first widely used passenger jet was the Boeing 707, because it was much more economical than other aircraft at that time. At the same time, turboprop propulsion started to appear for smaller commuter planes, making it possible to serve small-volume routes in a much wider range of weather conditions.

Since the 1960s composite material airframes and quieter, more efficient engines have become available, and Concorde provided supersonic passenger service for more than two decades. However, the most important lasting innovations have taken place in instrumentation and control. The arrival of solid-state electronics, the Global Positioning System, satellite communications, and increasingly small and powerful computers and LED displays, have dramatically changed the cockpits of airliners and, increasingly, of smaller aircraft as well. Pilots can navigate much more accurately and view terrain, obstructions, and other nearby aircraft on a map or through synthetic vision, even at night or in low visibility.

On June 21, 2004, SpaceShipOne became the first privately funded aircraft to make a spaceflight, opening the possibility of an aviation market capable of leaving the Earth's atmosphere. Meanwhile, the need to decarbonize the aviation industry to face the climate crisis has increased research into aircraft powered by alternative fuels, such as ethanol, electricity, hydrogen, and solar energy, with flying prototypes becoming more common.

== Operations of aircraft ==
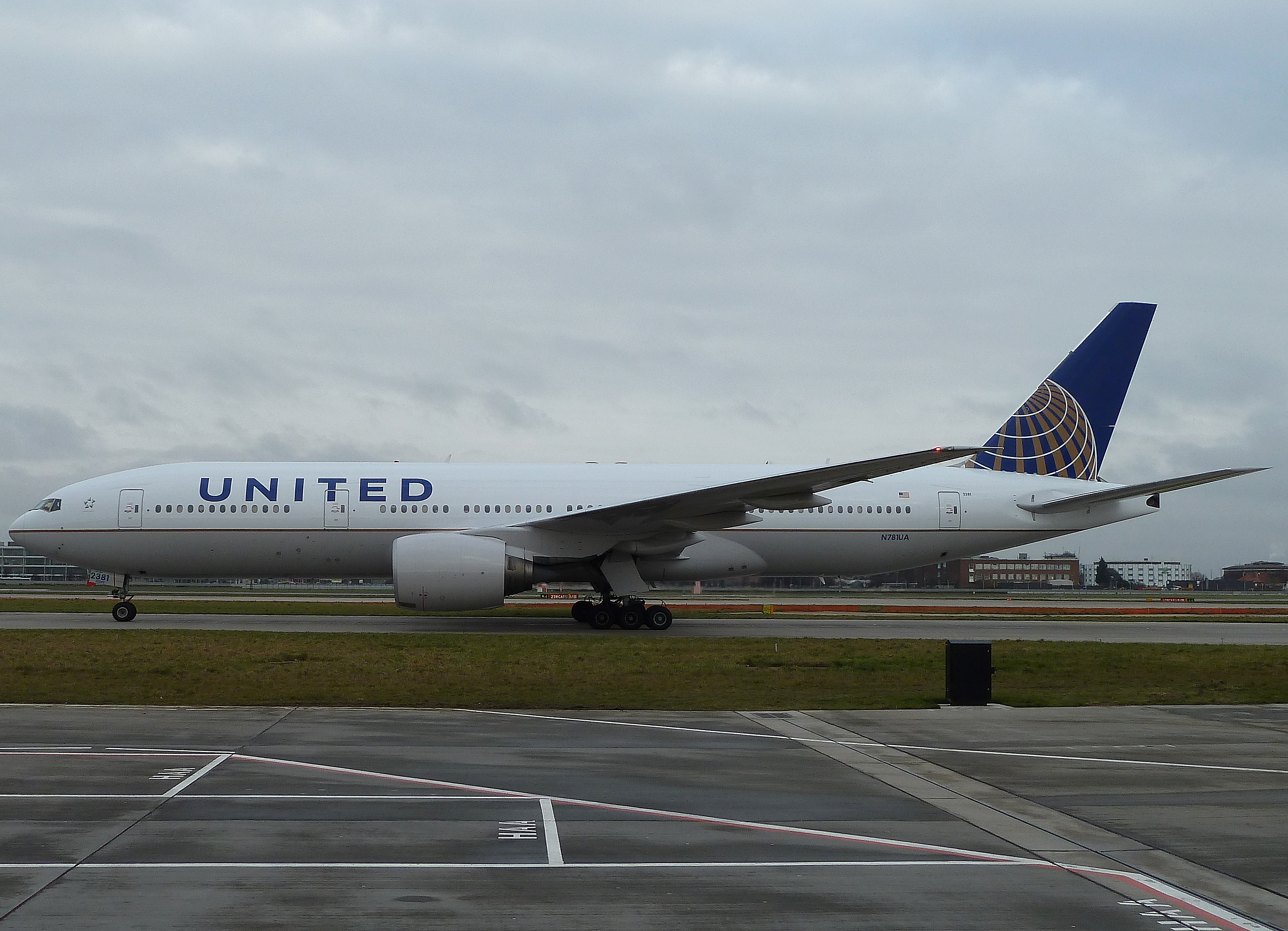
A United Airlines Boeing 777-200 taxiing on the tarmac of Heathrow Airport in January 2011. The Boeing 777 is a popular choice for airlines that operate a wide-body aircraft.

=== Civil aviation ===
Civil aviation includes all non-military flying, both general aviation and scheduled air transport.

==== Air transport ====
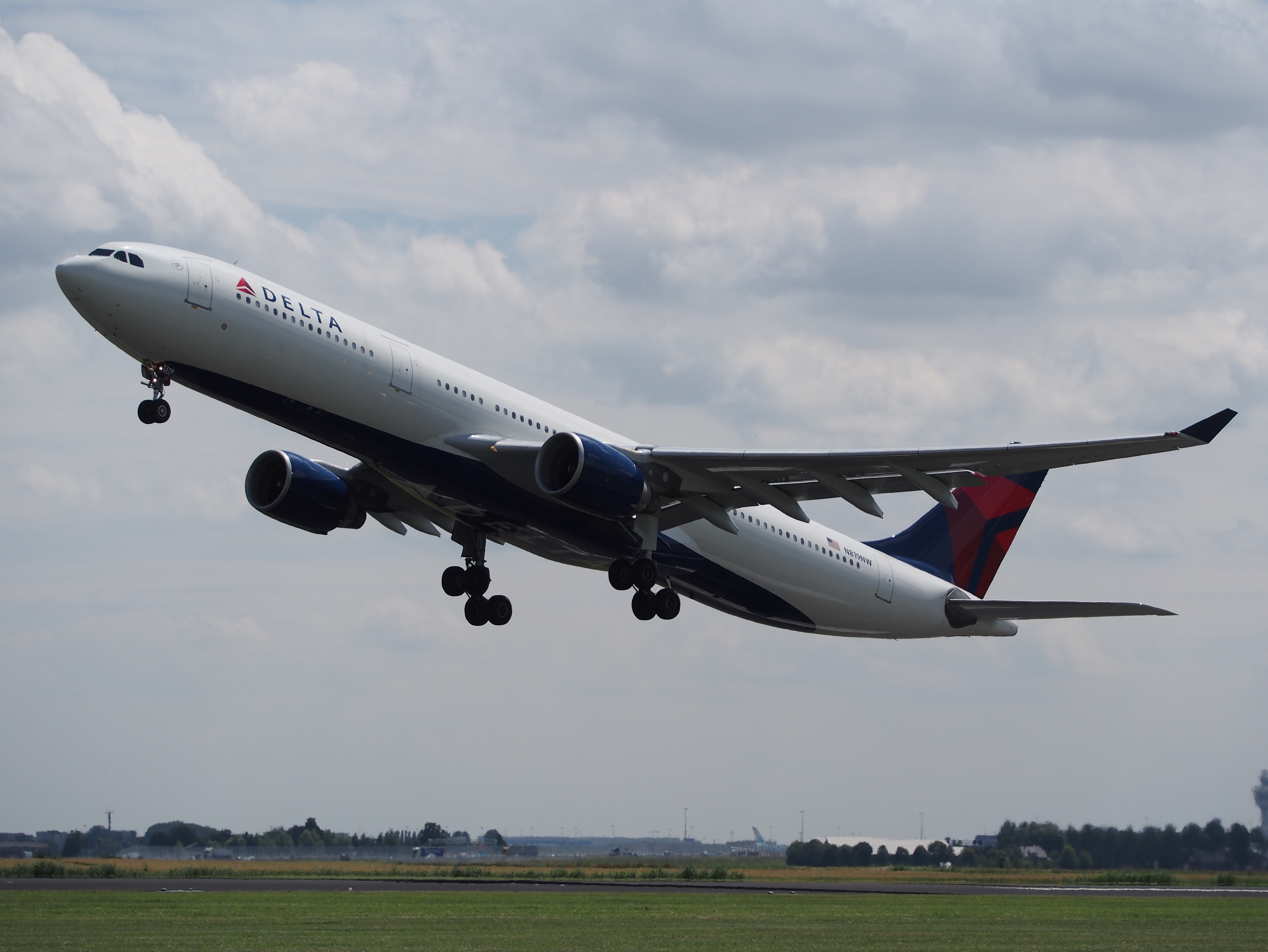
A Delta Air Lines Airbus A330-323 taking off at Amsterdam Schiphol Airport in July 2017

There are seven major manufacturers of civil transport aircraft:

- Airbus, based in Europe
- Antonov, based in Ukraine
- Boeing, based in the United States
- Bombardier, based in Canada
- Comac, based in China
- Embraer, based in Brazil
- United Aircraft Corporation, based in Russia, with its subsidiaries Ilyushin, Tupolev, Yakovlev and Sukhoi

Boeing, Airbus, Ilyushin and Tupolev concentrate on wide-body and narrow-body jet airliners, while Bombardier, Embraer and Sukhoi concentrate on regional airliners. Large networks of specialized parts suppliers from around the world support these manufacturers, who sometimes provide only the initial design and final assembly in their own plants. The Chinese ACAC consortium has also entered the civil transport market with its Comac ARJ21 regional jet in june, 2016.

Until the 1970s, most major airlines were flag carriers, sponsored by their governments and heavily protected from competition. Since then, open skies agreements have resulted in increased competition and choice for consumers, coupled with falling prices for airlines. The combination of high fuel prices, low fares, high salaries, as well as crises such as the September 11 attacks and the SARS pandemic have driven many older airlines to government-bailouts, bankruptcy or mergers. At the same time, low-cost carriers such as Ryanair, Southwest and WestJet have flourished.

==== General aviation ====
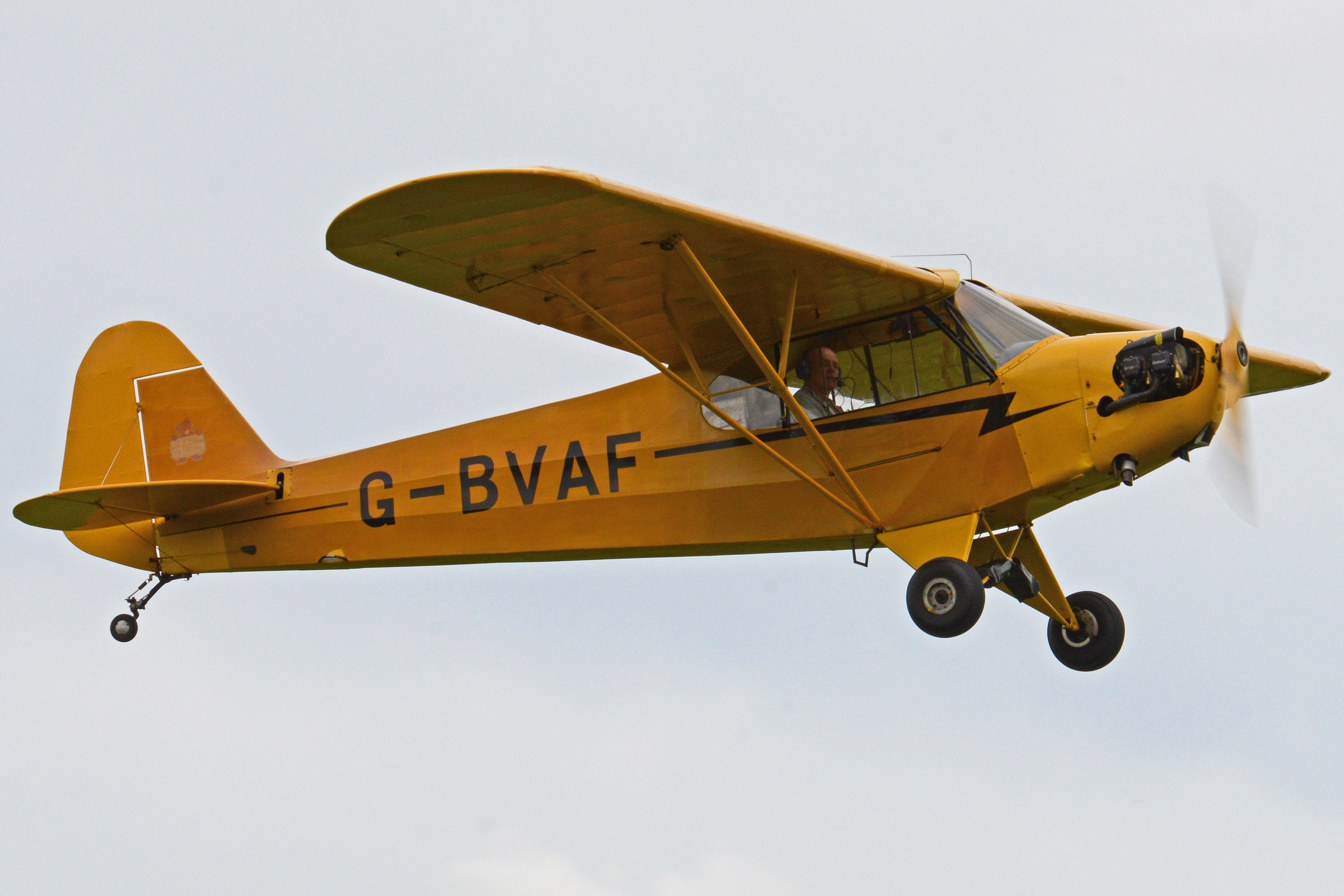
1940 Piper Cub.

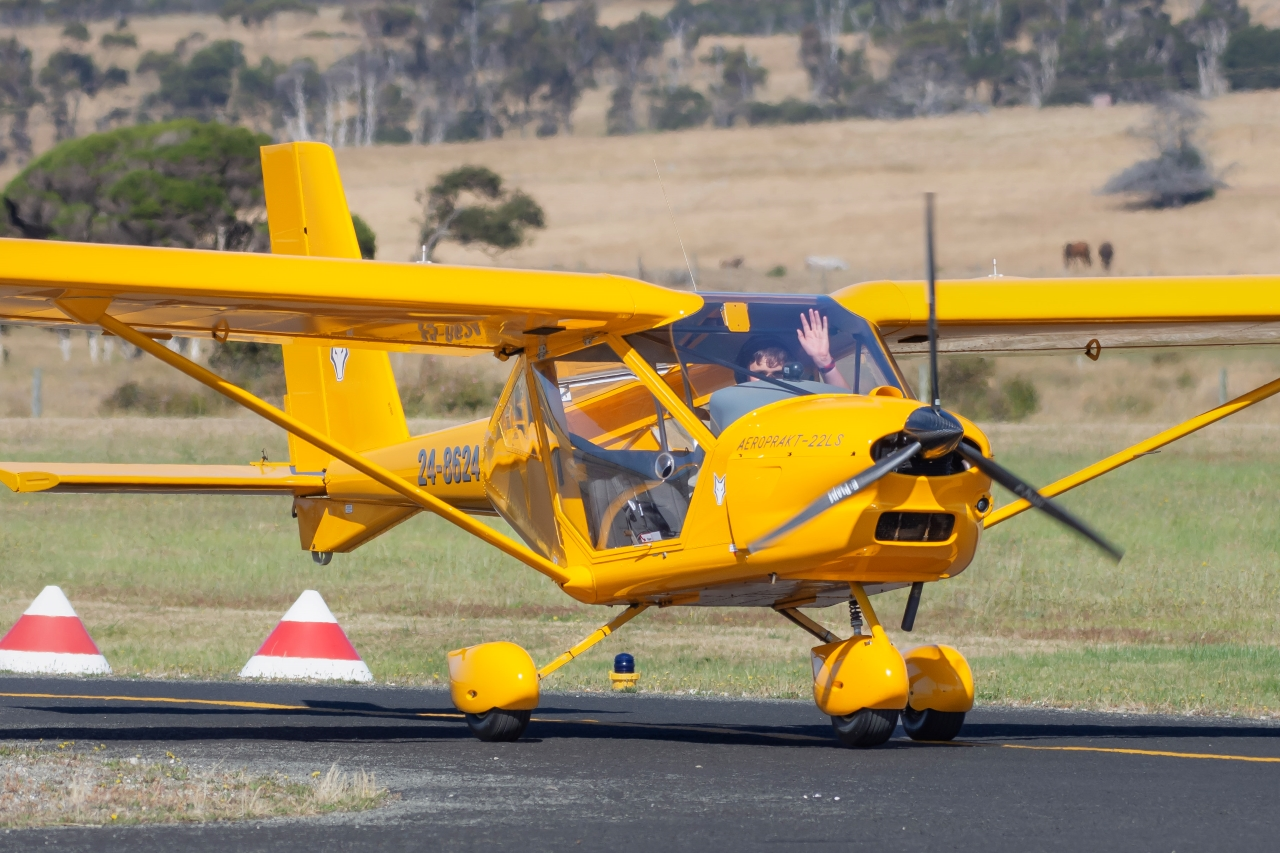
A22LS-Foxbat taxing after a student solo.

General aviation includes all non-scheduled civil flying, both private and commercial. General aviation may include business flights, air charter, private aviation, flight training, ballooning, paragliding, parachuting, gliding, hang gliding, aerial photography, foot-launched powered hang gliders, air ambulance, crop dusting, charter flights, traffic reporting, police air patrols and forest fire fighting.

Each country regulates aviation differently, but general aviation usually falls under different regulations depending on whether it is private or commercial and on the type of equipment involved.

Many small aircraft manufacturers serve the general aviation market, with a focus on private aviation and flight training.

The most important recent developments for small aircraft, which form the bulk of the GA fleet, have been the introduction of advanced avionics (including GPS) that were formerly found only in large airliners, and the introduction of composite materials to make small aircraft lighter and faster. Ultralight and homebuilt aircraft have also become increasingly popular for recreational use, since in most countries that allow private aviation, they are much less expensive and less heavily regulated than certified aircraft.

=== Military aviation ===
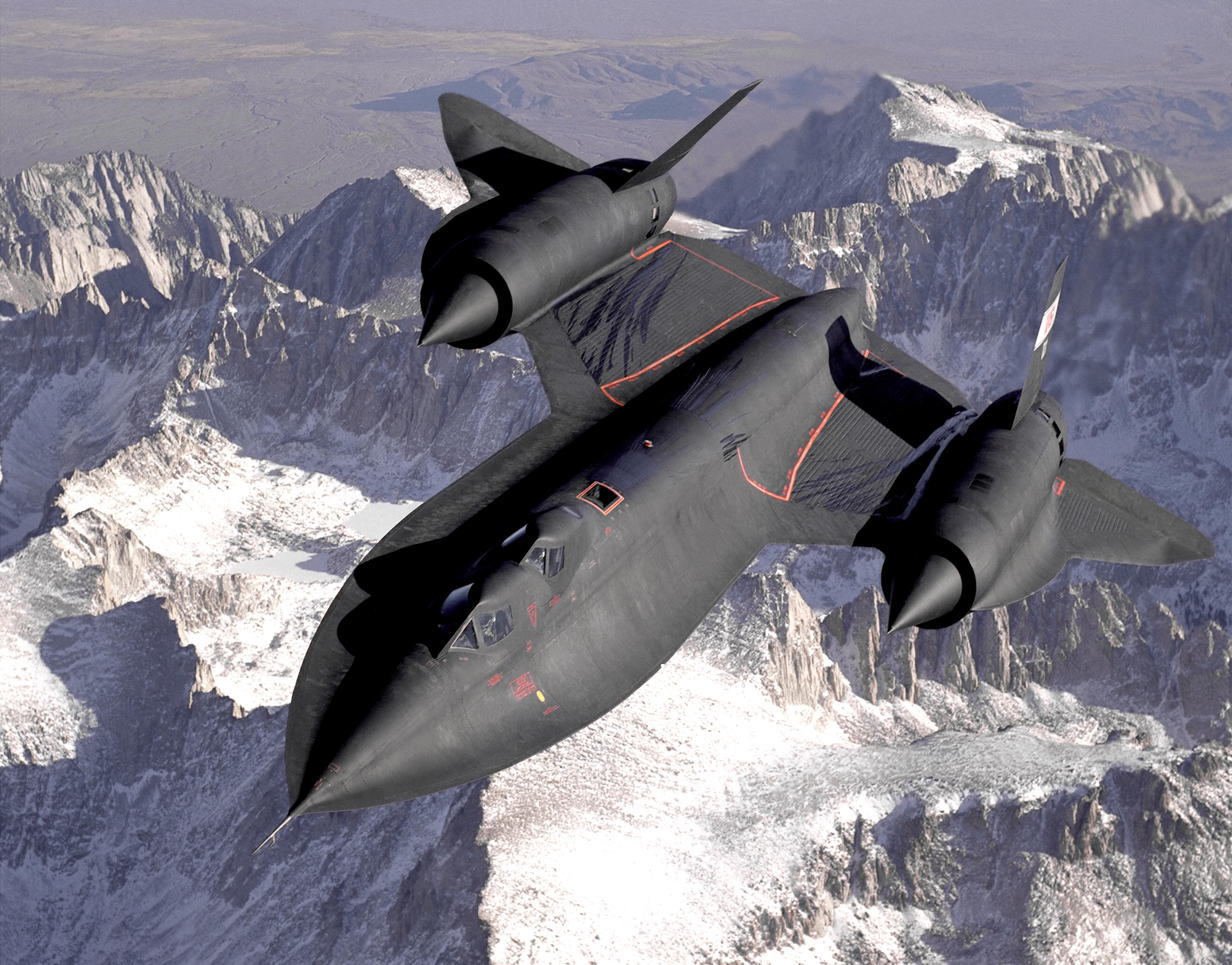
The Lockheed SR-71 remains unsurpassed in many areas of performance.

Simple balloons were used as surveillance aircraft as early as the 18th century. Over the years, military aircraft have been built to meet ever increasing capability requirements. Manufacturers of military aircraft compete for contracts to supply their government's arsenal. Aircraft are selected based on factors like cost, performance and the speed of production.

==== Types of military aviation ====
- Fighter aircraft's primary function is to destroy other aircraft.
  - Examples: the F-35, Eurofighter Typhoon, F-15, MiG-29, Su-27, and the F-22.
- Ground attack aircraft are used against tactical Earth-bound targets.
  - Examples: the Panavia Tornado, A-10, Il-2, J-22 Orao, AH-64 and the Su-25.
- Bombers are generally used against more strategic targets, such as factories and oil fields.
  - Examples: the B-2, Tu-95, Mirage IV, and the B-52.
- Transport aircraft are used to transport hardware and personnel.
  - Examples: the C-17 Globemaster III, C-130 Hercules and the Mil Mi-26.
- Surveillance and reconnaissance aircraft obtain information about enemy forces.
  - Examples: the RC-135, E-8, U-2, OH-58 and the MiG-25R.
- Unmanned aerial vehicles (UAVs) are used primarily as reconnaissance fixed-wing aircraft, though many also carry payloads.
  - Examples: the MQ-9, RQ-4, and MQ-1C Gray Eagle). Cargo aircraft are in development.
- Missiles deliver warheads, normally explosives.

=== Air safety ===
Aviation safety means the state of an aviation system or organization in which risks associated with aviation activities, related to, or in direct support of the operation of aircraft, are reduced and controlled to an acceptable level. It encompasses the theory, practice, investigation, and categorization of flight failures, and the prevention of such failures through regulation, education, and training. It can also be applied in the context of campaigns that inform the public as to the safety of air travel.

=== Aviation MRO ===
A maintenance, repair, and overhaul organization (MRO) is a firm that ensures airworthiness or air transport. According to a 2024 article, "maintenance (M) involves inspecting, cleaning, oiling, and changing aircraft parts after a certain number of flight hours. Repair (R) is restoring the original function of parts and components. Overhaul (O) refers to extensive maintenance, the complete refurbishment of the aircraft, and upgrades in avionics, which can take several weeks to complete." Airlines are legally obligated to certify airworthiness, meaning that a civil aviation authority must approve an aircraft suitable for safe flight operations. MRO firms are responsible for this process, thoroughly checking and documenting all components' repairs while tracking mechanical, propulsion, and electronic parts. Aviation regulators oversee maintenance practices in the country of aircraft registration, manufacture, or current location. All aircraft maintenance activities must adhere to international regulations that mandate standards.

== Aviation accidents and incidents ==
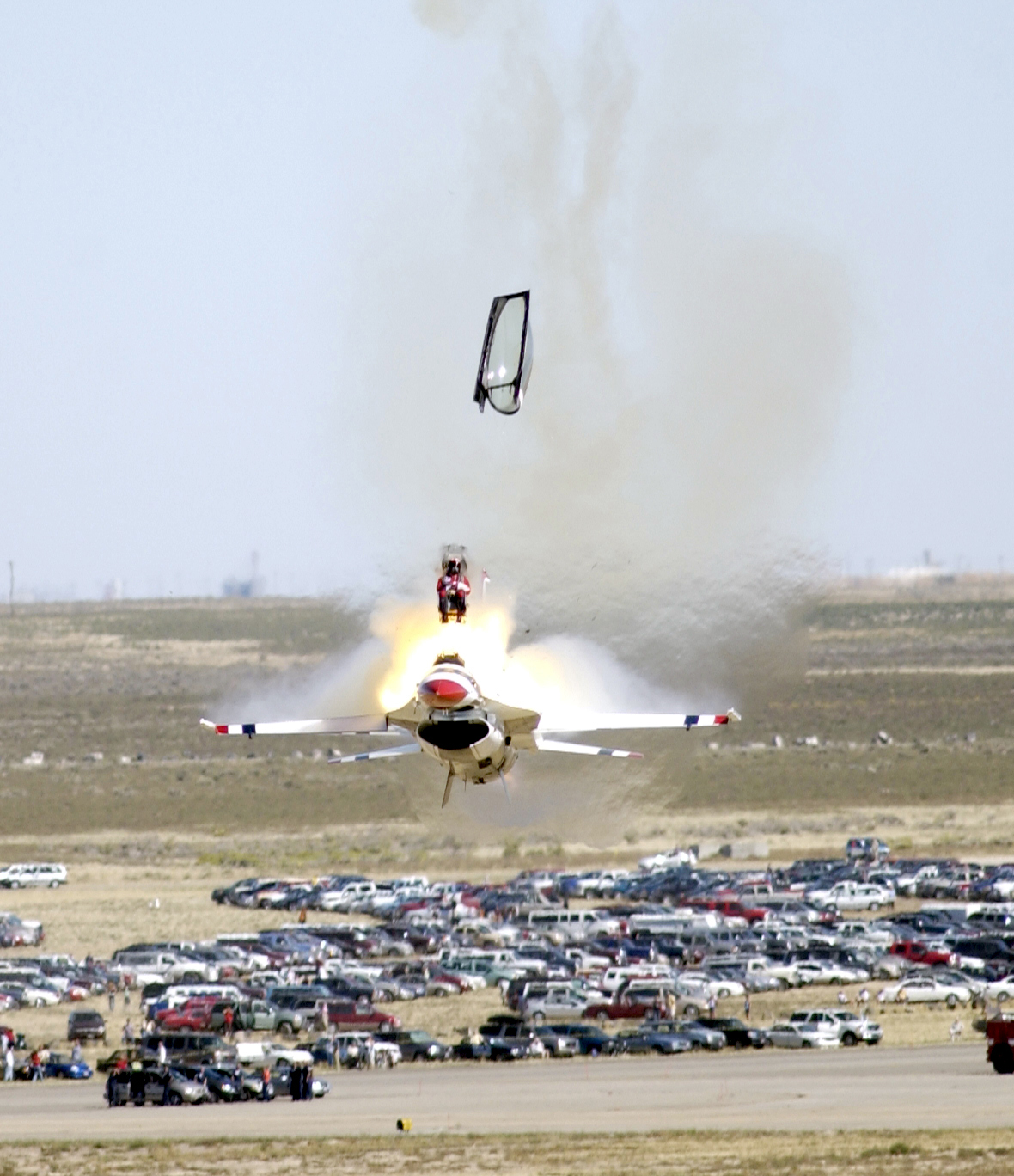
A USAF Thunderbird pilot ejecting from his F-16 aircraft at an air show in 2003.

An aviation accident is defined by the Convention on International Civil Aviation Annex 13 as an occurrence associated with the operation of an aircraft which takes place between the time any person boards the aircraft with the intention of flight until such time as all such persons have disembarked, in which a person is fatally or seriously injured, the aircraft sustains damage or structural failure or the aircraft is missing or is completely inaccessible. An accident in which the damage to the aircraft is such that it must be written off, or in which the plane is destroyed, is called a hull loss accident.

The first fatal aviation accident occurred in a Wright Model A aircraft at Fort Myer (now part of Joint Base Myer–Henderson Hall) in Virginia, on September 17, 1908, resulting in injury to the pilot, Orville Wright, and death of the passenger, Signal Corps Lieutenant Thomas Selfridge. The worst aviation accident in history was the Tenerife airport disaster on March 27, 1977, when 583 people died when two Boeing 747 jumbo jets, operated by Pan Am and KLM collided on a runway in Los Rodeos airport, now known as Tenerife North.

An aviation incident is defined as an occurrence, other than an accident, associated with the operation of an aircraft that affects or could affect the safety of operations.

== Air traffic control ==
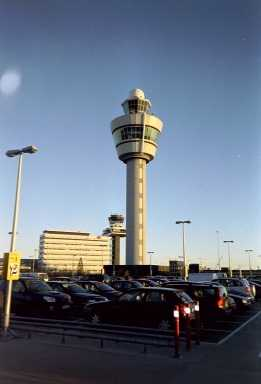
Air traffic control towers at Amsterdam Airport.

Air traffic control (ATC) involves communication with aircraft to help maintain separation – that is, they ensure that aircraft are sufficiently far enough apart horizontally or vertically for no risk of collision. Controllers may co-ordinate position reports provided by pilots, or in high traffic areas they may use radar to see aircraft positions.

Becoming an air traffic controller in the United States typically requires an associate or bachelor's degree from the Air Traffic Collegiate Training Initiative. The FAA also requires extensive training, along with medical examinations and background checks. Some controllers are required to work weekend, night, and holiday shifts.

There are generally four different types of ATC:

- Center controllers, who control aircraft en route between airports.
- Control towers of an airport. (including tower, ground control, clearance delivery, and other services), which control aircraft within a small distance (typically 10–15 km (6.2–9.3 mi) horizontal, and 1,000 m (3,300 ft) vertical).
- Oceanic controllers, who control aircraft over international waters between continents, generally without radar service.
- Terminal controllers, who control aircraft in a wider area (typically 50–80 km (31–50 mi)) around busy airports.

ATC is especially important for aircraft flying under instrument flight rules (IFR) when they may be in weather conditions that do not allow the pilots to see other aircraft. However, in very high-traffic areas, especially near major airports, aircraft flying under visual flight rules (VFR) are also required to follow instructions from ATC.

In addition to separation from other aircraft, ATC may provide weather advisories, terrain separation, navigation assistance, and other services to pilots, depending on their workload.

ATC does not control all flights. The majority of Visual Flight Rules (VFR) flights in the United States and Canada are not required to contact ATC unless they are passing through a busy terminal area or using a major airport, and in many areas, such as northern Canada and low altitude in northern Scotland, air traffic control services are not available, even for IFR flights at lower altitudes.

== Environmental impact ==
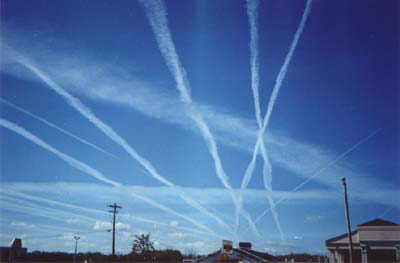
Water vapor contrails left by high-altitude jet airliners. These may contribute to cirrus cloud formation.

Like all activities involving combustion, operating powered aircraft, from airliners to hot air balloons, releases soot and other pollutants into the atmosphere. Greenhouse gases such as carbon dioxide (CO_{2}) are also produced. In addition, there are environmental impacts specific to aviation: for instance:

- Aircraft operating at high altitudes near the tropopause, mainly large jet airliners, emit aerosols and leave contrails, both of which can increase cirrus cloud formation – cloud cover may have increased by up to 0.2% since the birth of aviation. Clouds can have both a cooling and warming effect. They reflect some of the Sun's rays back into space but also block some of the heat radiated by Earth's surface. On average, both thin natural cirrus clouds and contrails have a net warming effect.
- Aircraft operating at high altitudes near the tropopause can also release chemicals that interact with greenhouse gases at those altitudes, particularly nitrogen compounds, which interact with ozone, increasing ozone concentrations.
- Most light piston aircraft burn aviation gasoline (avgas), which contains tetraethyllead (TEL). Some lower-compression piston engines can operate on unleaded motor gasoline (mogas), and turbine engines and diesel engines – neither of which require lead – are appearing on some newer light aircraft.

Another environmental impact of aviation is noise pollution, mainly caused by aircraft taking off and landing. Sonic booms were a problem with supersonic aircraft such as the Concorde.

== Innovation and development ==
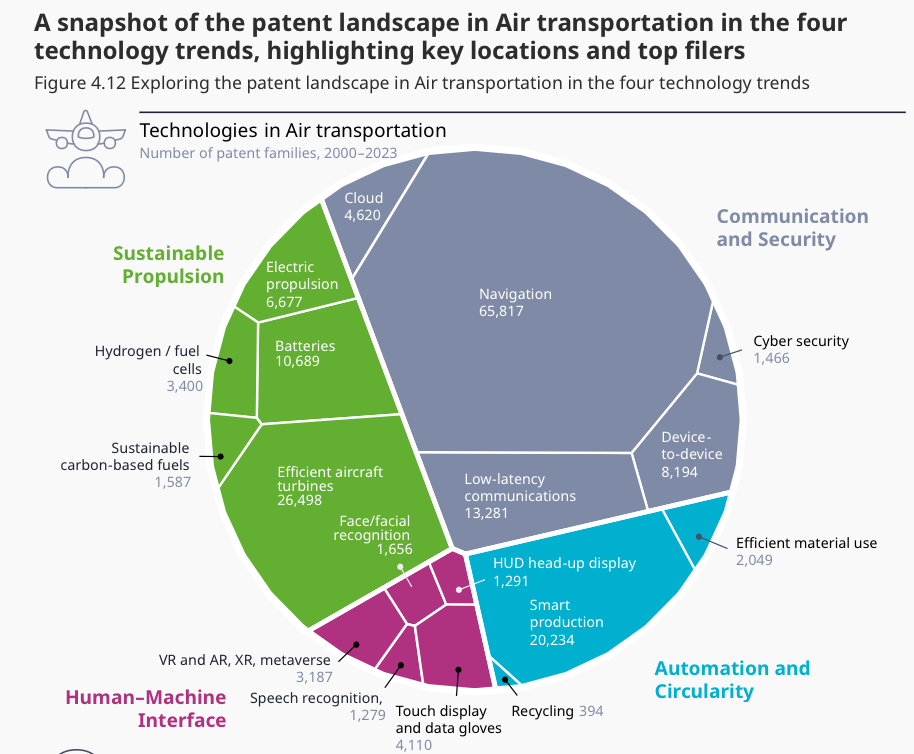
Technology trends in Air transportation: patent landscape in air transport.

Air transportation is a mode of travel and commerce, involving the movement of people, goods, and animals through the atmosphere using aircraft such as airplanes and helicopters. It is a major mode for the overall transportation system, because of its speed and the ability to cover long distances quickly, connecting remote regions and major economic hubs. It plays a significant role in global trade and passenger mobility, influencing economic development and international relations. However, its share of CO_{2} emissions is significant, accounting for 2% of global CO_{2} emissions in 2023, having grown faster between 2000 and 2019 than rail, road or shipping. Even under the High Ambition scenario, where total emissions are reduced significantly, aviation emissions will still be a major concern.

The International Air Transport Association (IATA) has highlighted the need for ambitious policies in order to achieve significant reductions in aviation emissions, projecting that CO_{2} emissions from aviation could be lowered by up to 50% by 2050 with the right measures in place. The International Civil Aviation Organization (ICAO) also emphasizes the potential of accelerating the transition to sustainable aviation fuels (SAFs) and implementing efficiency technologies for both commercial and cargo aircraft to achieve significant emission reductions. These commitments reflect a concerted effort by global organizations to address the climate impact of the aviation sector.

Two significant megatrends are observed in terms of air transport innovation, sustainability and digitalization. A report published by WIPO in 2025 showed a steady increase of patents publication in air transportation, the majority of which being related to communication and security, followed by sustainable propulsion.

Sustainable Propulsion technologies are being developed to reduce emissions and improve environmental sustainability. Efficient aircraft turbines are used to improve fuel efficiency, reduce emissions and lower noise levels. Aviation biofuels aim for a reduction in CO_{2} emissions compared to traditional jet fuel. Battery-based electric and/or hybrid aircraft are being developed for short-haul and regional flights. Hydrogen-powered aircraft are intended for long-haul flights and heavy-duty applications.

Automation and Circularity technologies are promoting efficient material use, smart production and robotics, and enhanced recycling practices.

Communication and Security technologies are impacting air transportation by improving operational efficiency, safety and customer experience. They include navigation technologies such as advanced air traffic management (ATM) systems, device-to-device technology, cloud computing, low-latency internet, and cybersecurity. Analysis by McKinsey & Company has stated that the rise in digital technologies has made aviation systems more vulnerable to cyberattacks, emphasizing the need for robust cybersecurity measures.

Advanced Human– Machine Interfaces, such as extended reality technologies, speech recognition technology, facial recognition technology, touch displays and data gloves, and head-up displays, are making interactions more intuitive, secure, and responsive, thereby improving operational efficiency and user experience.

The air transportation sector is undergoing a surge in patenting activity, with annual Air transport-related patent families increasing from under 1,100 in 2000 to over 12,800 in 2023 – a growth of 11%. China, the South Korea, and Japan stand out for their high patent volumes and significant growth rates, although they exhibit a relatively low Relative Specialization Index, reflecting a broad approach to innovation at the country-level across various sectors. In contrast, France, the United States and Canada demonstrate a high degree of specialization in Air transportation technologies reflecting a concentrated focus on advancing specific innovations in aviation.

== See also ==
- Aeronautics – Science of air flight-capable machines
- Environmental impact of aviation – Effect of emissions from aircraft engines
- Index of aviation articles
- Timeline of aviation
- Transport in the European Union

== Bibliography ==
- Berliner, Don (1996). Aviation: Reaching for the Sky. The Oliver Press, Inc. ISBN 1-881508-33-1.
- Cassard, Jean-Christophe (2008). Dictionnaire d'histoire de Bretagne (in French). Morlaix: Skol Vreizh. ISBN 978-2-915623-45-1.
- De Angelis, Gina (2001). The Hindenburg. Philadelphia: Chelsea House Publishers. ISBN 0-7910-5272-9.
- This article incorporates text by Wirths, Oliver; Tóth, Zsófia; Diaz Ruiz, Carlos available under the CC BY 4.0 license.
- This article incorporates text from a free content work. Licensed under CC-BY-4.0. Text taken from WIPO Technology Trends: Future of Transportation, WIPO.
