= Ader Avion II =

Early experimental aircraft

Avion II
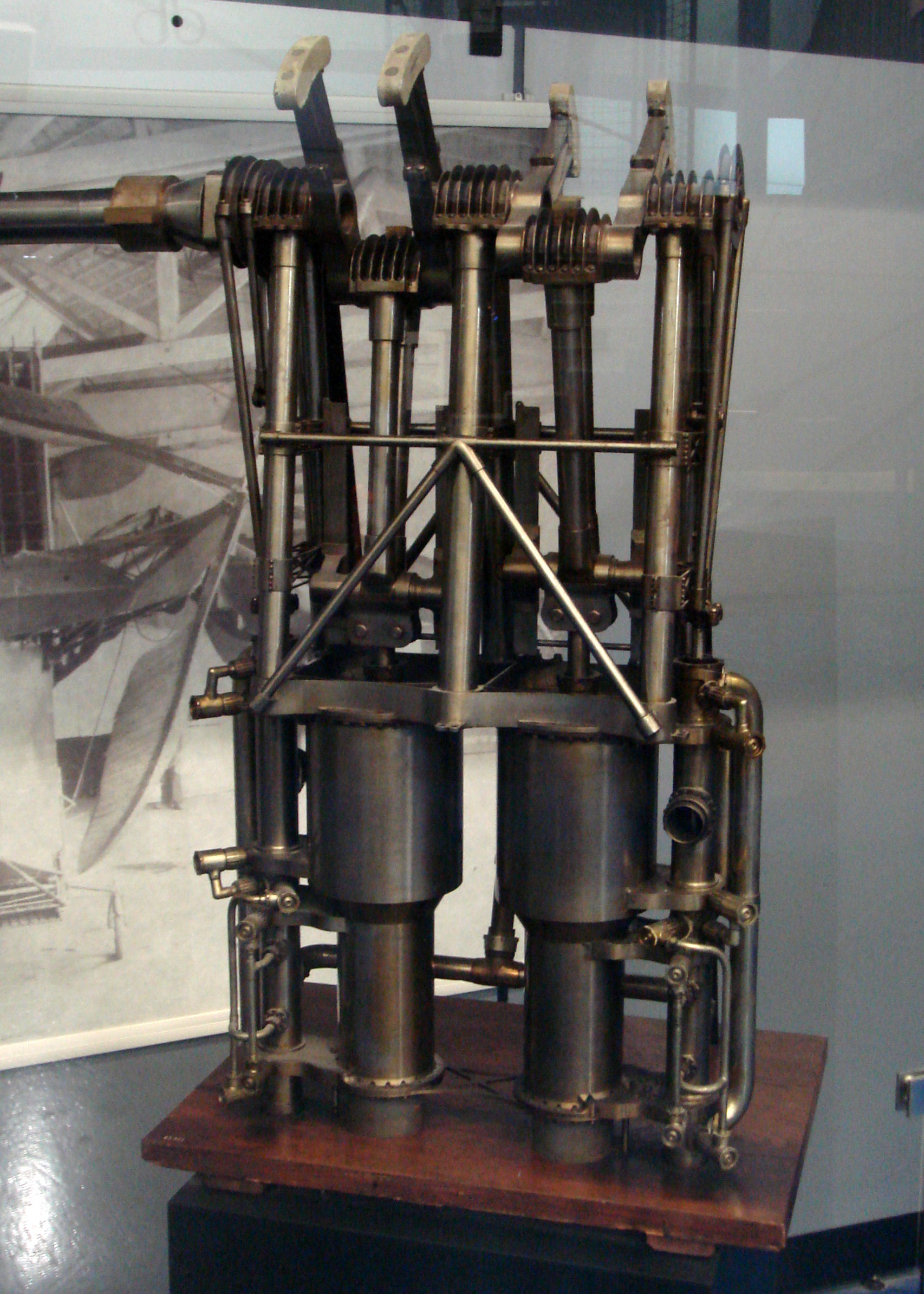
- Ader's 1892 steam engine, called Zéphyr, developed for Avion II, on display at the Musée de l'Air et de l'Espace.

General information
- Type: Pioneer aircraft
- National origin: France
- Designer: Clément Ader
- Number built: 1 partially completed

History
- Developed from: Ader Eole

The Avion II (originally referred to as the Zephyr (west wind) or the Éole II) was the second primitive aircraft designed by Clément Ader in 1893. Most sources agree that work on it was never completed, Ader abandoning it in favour of the Avion III that had a financial backer. Ader's later claim that he flew the Avion II in August 1892 for a distance of 100 m at a field in Satory is not widely accepted.

== Design and development ==
The name "Avion" was devised by Ader from Latin avis ("bird") and became the origin of the word avion, the most common in French to designate an airplane (heavier-than-air aircraft). The first official text noting it is French patent no. 205 555 granted to Ader on April 19, 1890.

The engine developed for Avion II, called Zéphyr was a light steam engine driving a 3 m (10 ft) diameter 4-bladed propeller, in which steam was cooled through a condenser. It yielded 22 kW (30 hp) at 480 rpm at a pressure of 15 Pa (0.00 psi), weighing 33 kg (73 lb) dry, and 134 kg (295 lb) with full boiler and accessories.

== See also ==
Related development Ader Eole Aircraft of comparable role, configuration, and era Ader Avion III
