= Farid Zizi =

French public servant

- Education: Aerospace engineer
- Alma mater: École Polytechnique; École nationale de l'aviation civile
- Occupation: CEO of France Aviation Civile Services
- Known for: CEO of the Direction des Services de la navigation aérienne
- Predecessor: Stephane DURAND

Farid Zizi is a French public servant. On 1 August 2018, he was nominated CEO of France Aviation Civile Services (formerly DSNA Services).

== Biography ==
A graduate from the École Polytechnique and the ENAC, he starts his career as responsible of operational and technical requirements and maintenance operations of ATM systems for French Airports and ACCs at the Operational Direction of DSNA.

Then, at ENAC, he became head of the ATM department, and then head of Education and Research. During seven years, he was President of the Air Navigation Commission at ICAO.

On 1 August 2018, he was nominated CEO of DSNA Services, which became France Aviation Civile Services in 2019.
