= FRACS =

FRACS may refer to:

- Royal Australasian College of Surgeons, the leading advocate for surgical standards
- France Aviation Civile Services, a Groupement d'intérêt économique.
