= Gabriel de La Landelle =

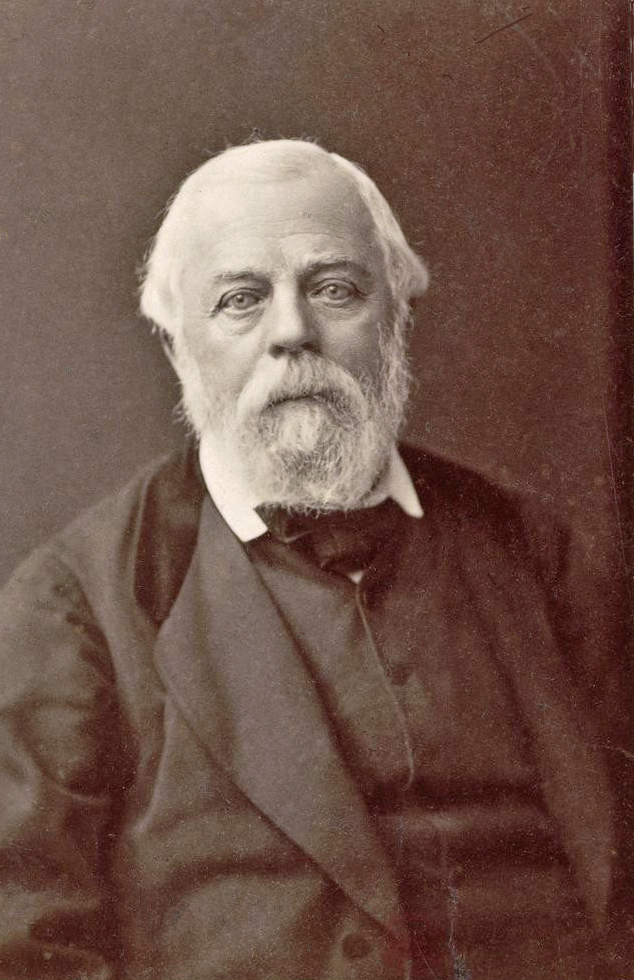
- Born: 5 March 1812
- Died: 19 January 1886 (aged 73)
- Occupation: Writer, sailor
- Awards: Chevalier of the Legion of Honour

Signature
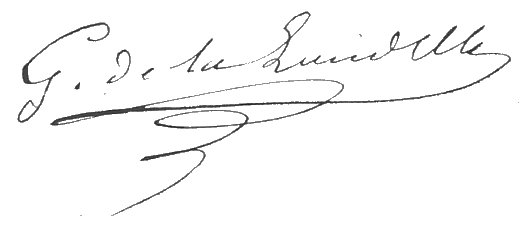

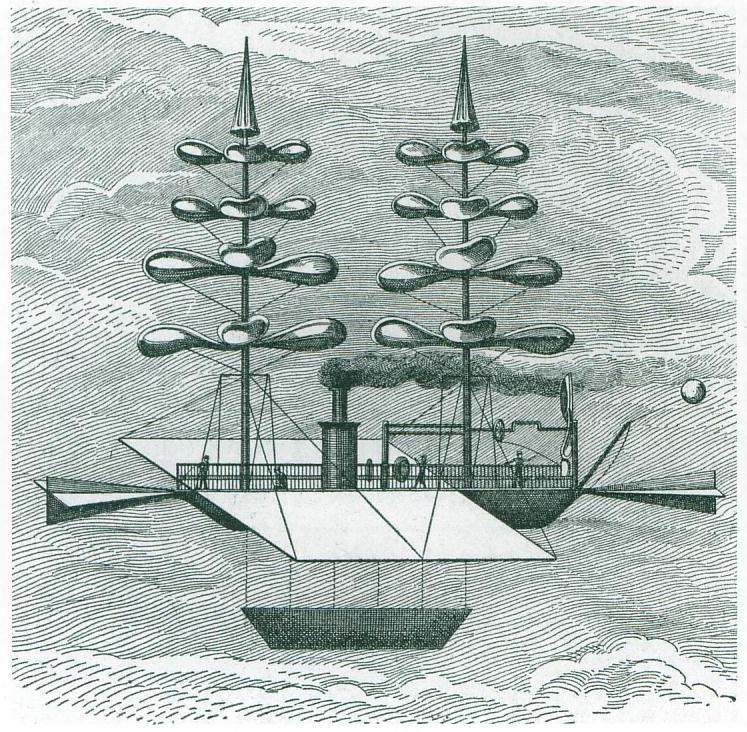
Drawing of an imaginary helicopter, powered by steam, imagined by Gabriel de la Landelle.

Guillaume Joseph Gabriel de La Landelle (born 5 March 1812, in Montpellier; died 19 January 1886, in Paris) was a French naval officer, journalist, and writer, a seafaring novelist, and author of other maritime works. He was also one of the pioneers of aeronautics. He served in the navy and authored several novels that depict maritime customs and naval warfare.

== Career ==
His project for the steam helicopter served as inspiration for Jules Verne's engine in his novel Robur le Conquérant (Robur the Conqueror).

He was also involved with aeronautics. Nadar, who had been enthusiastic about aviation since 1858, founded the Société d'encouragement de la locomotion aérienne au moyen du plus lourd que l'air (roughly translated as: Society for the Promotion of Air Locomotion with the Aid of Machines Heavier Than Air) together with Gabriel de La Landelle in 1863 and began building a giant balloon, aptly named Le Géant (The Giant). Its first flight took place in Paris on 4 October 1863, with 13 people on board, including Jules Verne.

== Selected publications ==
- Aviation ou navigation aérienne. Paris 1863
- (als Rapporteur) La Société d'encouragement de la locomotion aérienne: Au moyen d'appareils plus lourds que l'air. Rapport du Conseil d'administration pour les années 1864, 1865, 1866. Paris: J. Claye. 1865-7
- La Gorgone
- Frise-Poulet
- Couronne navale
- Haine à bord
- Les Marins
- Les Passagères. Roman maritime.
- Les deux routes de la vie
- Falkar le rouge (ou l'Affranchisement des Nègres).
- La Frégate l'Introuvable
- Les cousines de l'Introuvable (Forts. von La Frégate l'Introuvable)
- Les Enfants de Ravinol et le Siège de Lyon
- Réponse à la note (du prince de Joinville) sur l'état des forces navales de la France
- Le Langage des marins

== Bibliography ==
- Exposé de divers systèmes de navigation aérienne et réfutation de l'hélicoptère Nadar, Ponton d'Amécourt et de La Landelle, par Duchesne jeune. Éditions Dentu, Paris 1864
- Gustave de Ponton d'Amécourt: Collection de mémoires sur la locomotion aérienne sans Ballons. Volumes 1–4. Gauthier-Villars, Paris, 1864
