= L'Aviation Militaire =

1909 book by Clément Ader

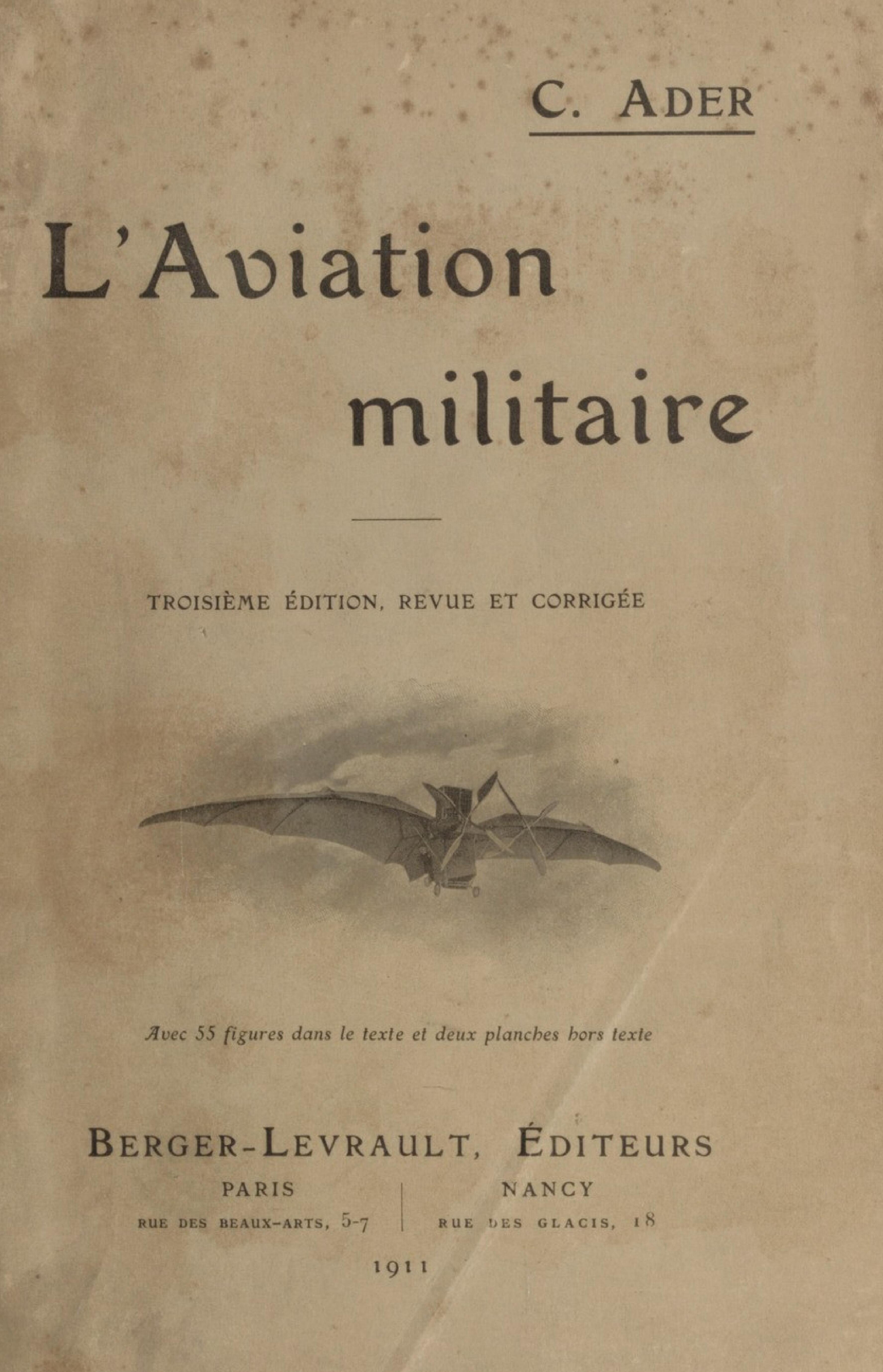
The cover page of L'Aviation Militaire.

L'Aviation Militaire (lit. "Military Aviation") was a book written by the French inventor Clément Ader and published in 1909 by the Paris publisher Berger-Levrault. The book was essentially based on ideas developed by Ader at the end of the 19th century, which were arranged in final form in 1907. It was hugely popular, and went through 10 editions in the five years between its publication and the First World War.

L'Aviation Militaire is especially famous for its precise description of the concept of the modern aircraft carrier with a flat flight deck, an island superstructure, deck elevators and a hangar bay.

On the structure of the aircraft carrier:

"An airplane-carrying vessel is indispensable. These vessels will be constructed on a plan very different from what is currently used. First of all the deck will be cleared of all obstacles. It will be flat, as wide as possible without jeopardizing the nautical lines of the hull, and it will look like a landing field."

— Military Aviation, p35

On stowage:

"Of necessity, the airplanes will be stowed below decks; they would be solidly fixed anchored to their bases, each in its place, so they would not be affected with the pitching and rolling. Access to this lower decks would be by an elevator sufficiently long and wide to hold an airplane with its wings folded. A large, sliding trap would cover the hole in the deck, and it would have waterproof joints, so that neither rain nor seawater, from heavy seas could penetrate below."

— Military Aviation, p36

On the technique of landing:

"The ship will be headed straight into the wind, the stern clear, but a padded bulwark set up forward in case the airplane should run past the stop line"

— Military Aviation, p37

The book received much attention, and the US naval attaché in Paris sent a report on his observations, before actual experiments took place in the United States a year later

L'Aviation Militaire was translated into English in 2003 by Lee Kennett for the Air University Press, under the title Military Aviation.
