= Ader Avion III =

Steam-powered aircraft built by Clément Ader

Avion III
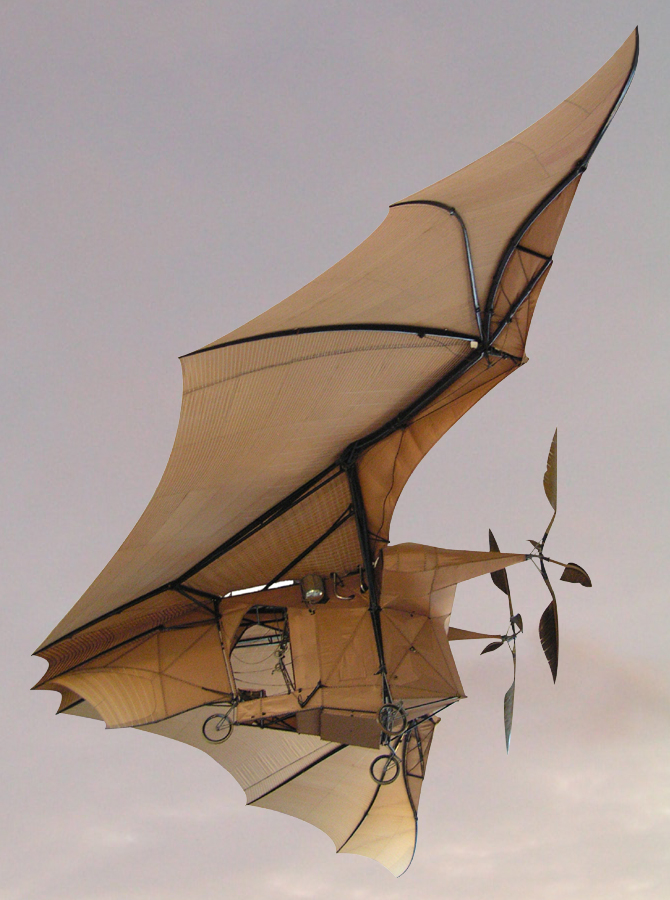
- Avion III (photo edited to show in flight)

General information
- Type: Experimental monoplane
- National origin: France
- Designer: Clément Ader
- Number built: 1

History
- First flight: 14 October 1897 (hops)
- Developed from: Avion II

The Avion III (sometimes referred to as the Aquilon or the Éole III) was a steam-powered aircraft built by Clément Ader between 1892 and 1897, financed by the French War Office.

Retaining the same bat-like configuration of the Éole, the Avion III was equipped with two engines driving two propellers. While the earlier aircraft had no means of directional control at all, this one was equipped with a rudder.

Trials began at the Satory army base near Versailles on 12 October 1897, with the aircraft taxiing along a circular track. On 14 October 1897, it left the track, turned halfway around, and then stopped, but did not take flight. Later in his life, Ader claimed that there had been a flight of 100 m (328 ft) on this day, and said he had two witnesses to confirm it. Regardless, the French military was unimpressed with the demonstration and cancelled any further funding.

The machine is preserved at the Musée des Arts et Métiers in Paris. It underwent extensive restoration in the 1980s.

== Specifications (Avion III) ==
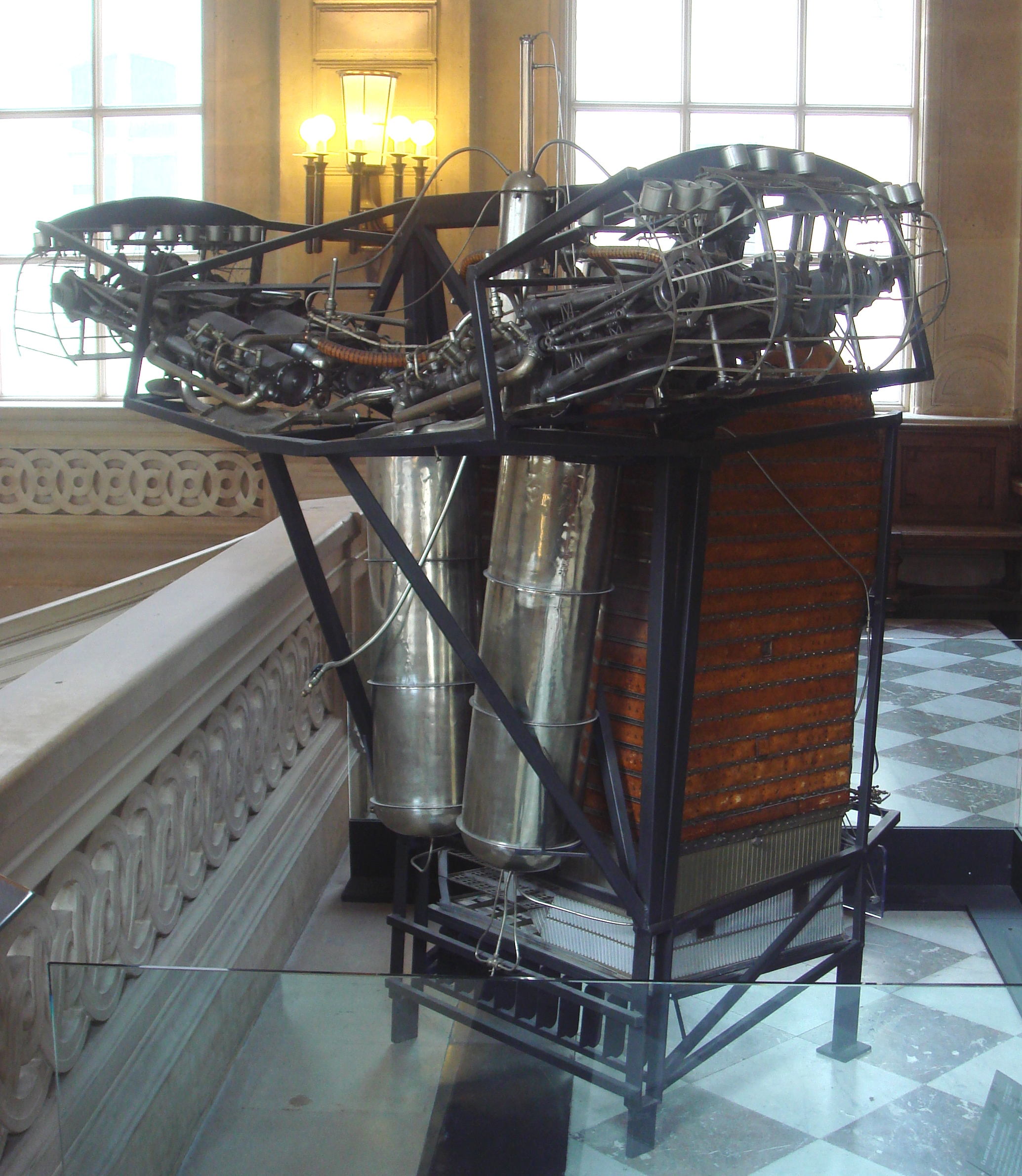
Steam engine of Eole III (seen from the front). Musée des Arts et Métiers.

Data from

General characteristics

- Crew: 1
- Wingspan: 16 m (52 ft 6 in)
- Wing area: 56 m^{2} (600 sq ft)
- Empty weight: 400 kg (882 lb)
- Powerplant: 2 × Ader steam engines , 15 kW (20 hp) each
- Propellers: 4-bladed sail type propellers

Performance

- Wing loading: 7 kg/m^{2} (1.4 lb/sq ft)
- Power/mass: 0.08 kW/kg (0.049 hp/lb)

== Gallery ==
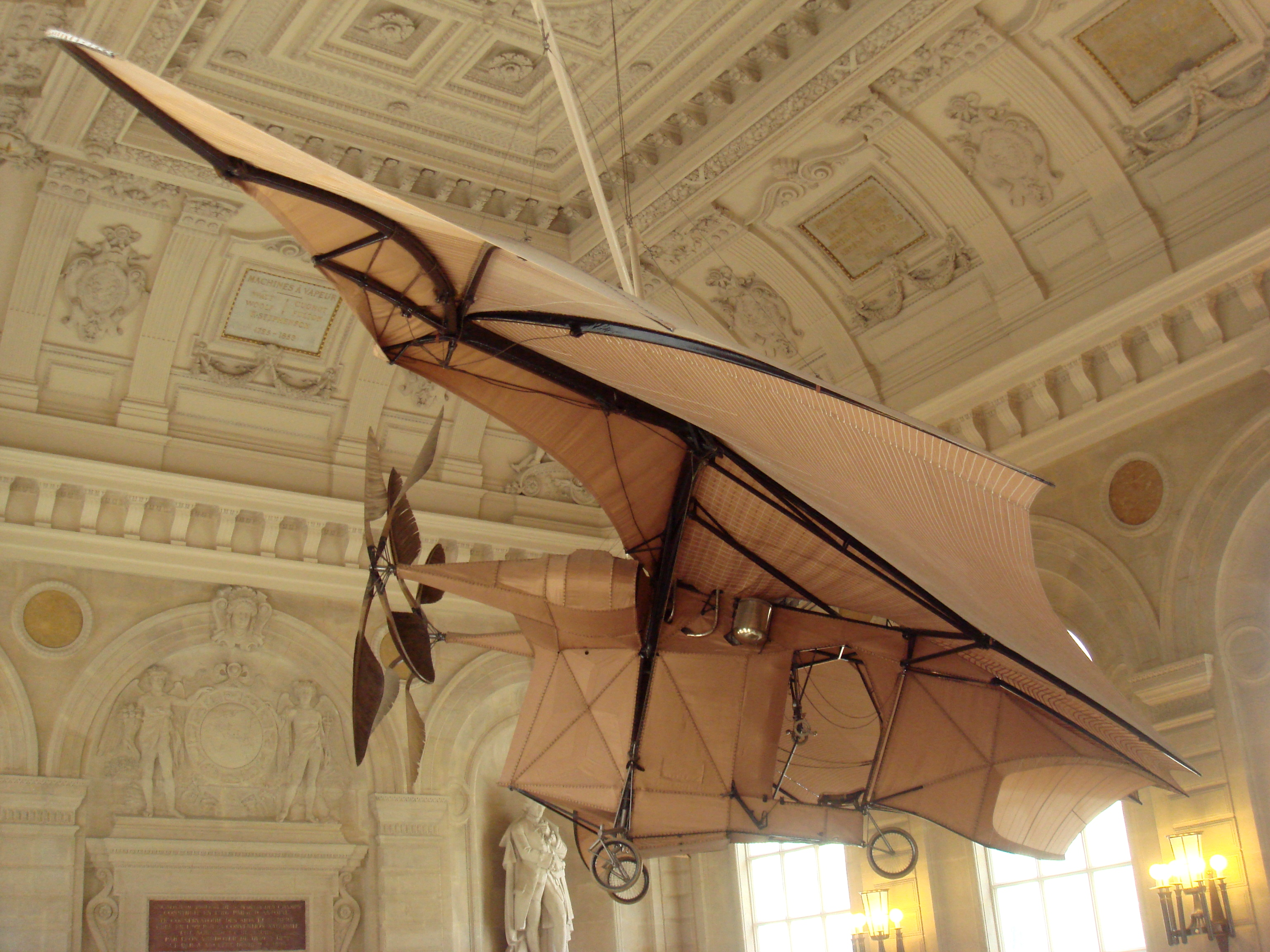
Avion III at Musée des Arts et Métiers.

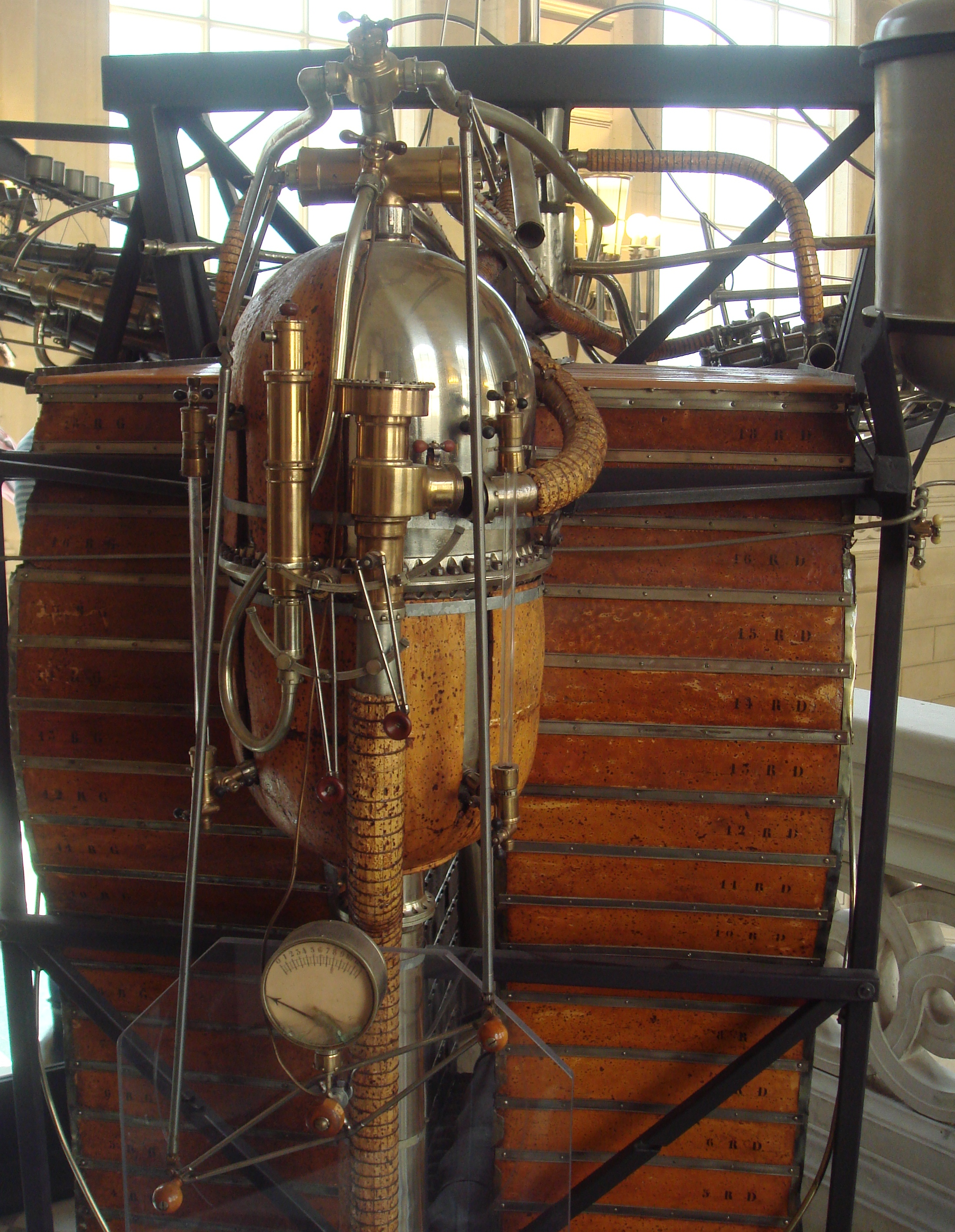
Steam engine of Eole III (seen from the back), with pressure valve. Musée des Arts et Métiers.

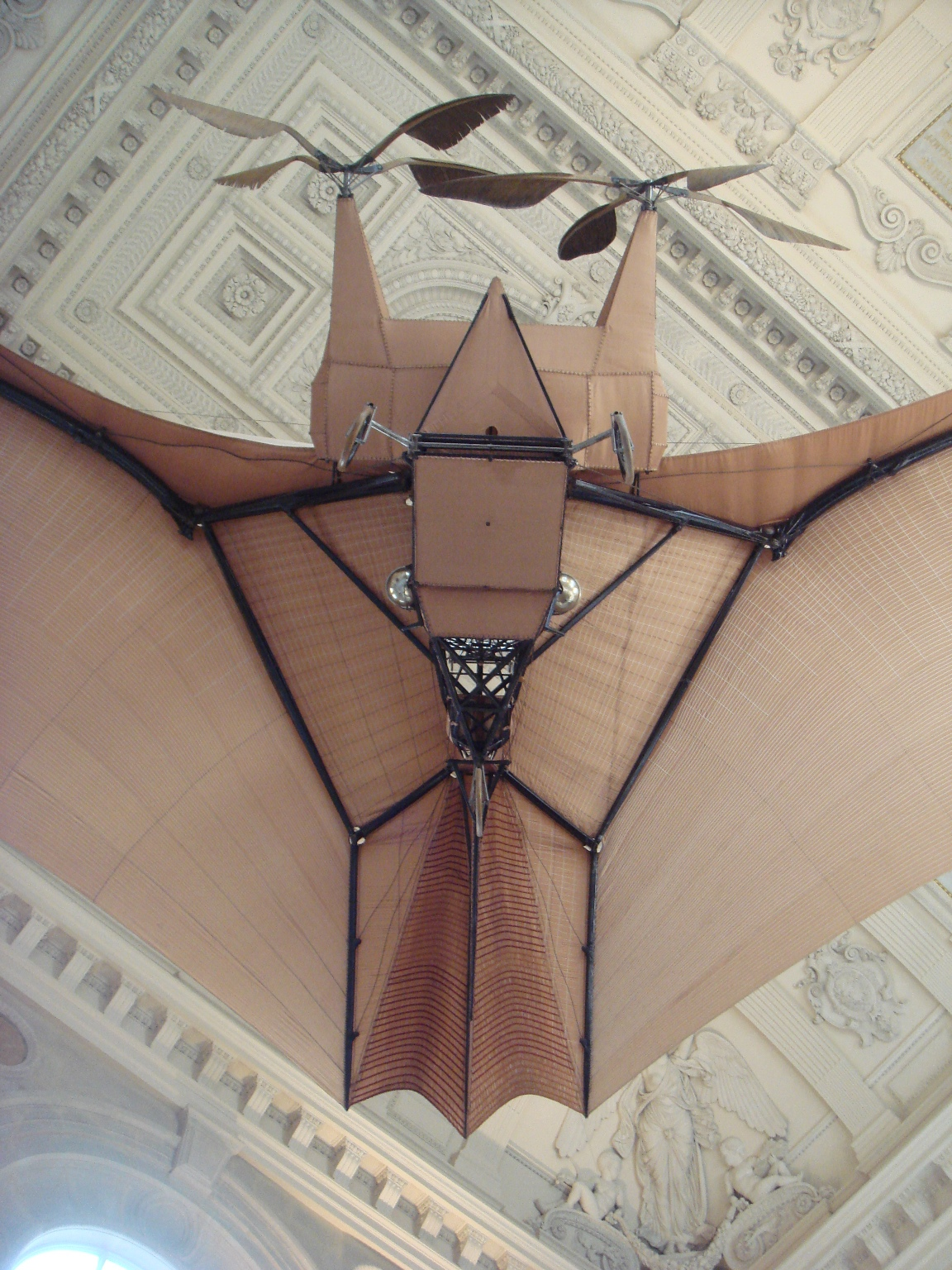
View from below.
