= Clément Ader =

French inventor and engineer (1841–1925)

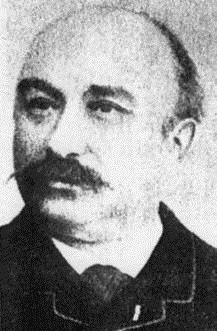
- Clément Ader in 1891
- Born: 2 April 1841; Muret, Haute-Garonne, France
- Died: 3 May 1925 (aged 84); Toulouse, Haute Garonne, Occitanie, France
- Engineering career
- Discipline: Electrical engineering; mechanical engineering; aircraft design
- Projects: Théâtrophone; L'Aviation Militaire
- Significant design: Éole; Avion III
- Significant advance: First self-propelled flight (1890)

Clément Ader (French pronunciation: [klemɑ̃ adɛʁ]; 2 April 1841 – 3 May 1925) was a French inventor and engineer who was born near Toulouse in Muret, Haute-Garonne, and died in Toulouse. He is remembered primarily for his pioneering work in aviation. In 1870 he was also one of the pioneers in the sport of cycling in France.

== Electrical and mechanical inventions ==
Ader was an innovator in electrical and mechanical engineering. He originally studied electrical engineering, and in 1878 improved on the telephone invented by Alexander Graham Bell. After this he established the telephone network in Paris in 1880. In 1881, he invented the théâtrophone, a system of telephonic transmission where listeners received a separate channel for each ear, enabling stereophonic perception of the actors on a set; it was this invention which gave the first stereo transmission of opera performances, over a distance of 2 miles (3 km) in 1881. In 1903, he devised a V8 engine for the Paris–Madrid race, but although three or four were produced, none was sold.

== Aircraft prototypes ==
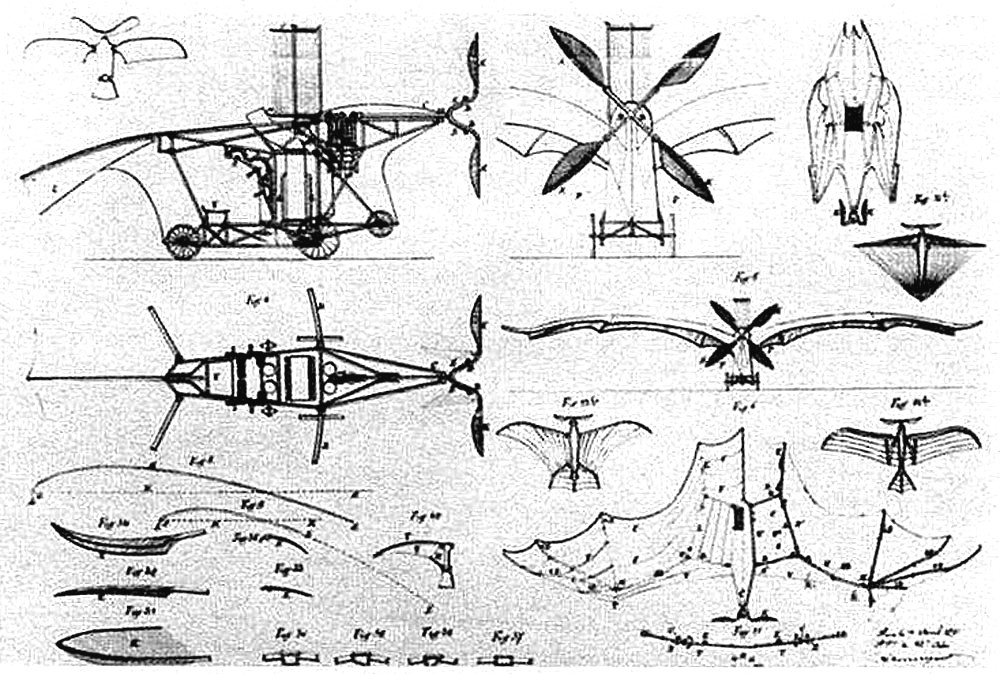
Patent drawings of Clement Ader's Éole.

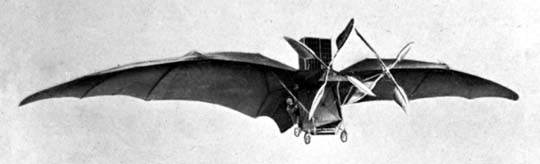
Clement Ader Avion III (1897 photograph).

Following his work with V8 engines, Ader turned to the problem of mechanical flight and until the end of his life gave much time and money to this. Using the studies of Louis Pierre Mouillard (1834–1897) on the flight of birds, he constructed his first flying machine in 1886, the Ader Éole. It was a bat-like design run by a lightweight steam engine of his own invention, with 4 cylinders with a power rating of 20 hp (15 kW), driving a four-blade propeller. The engine weighed 51 kg (112 lb). The wings had a span of 14 m (46 ft). All-up weight was 300 kg (660 lb). On 9 October 1890 Ader attempted to fly the Éole. Aviation historians give credit to this effort as a powered take-off and uncontrolled flight in ground effect of approximately 50 m (160 ft) at a height of approximately 20 centimetres (8 in). Ader also claimed credit for getting off the ground in the Éole.

Ader began construction of a second aircraft he called the Avion II, also referred to as the Zephyr or Éole II. Most sources agree that work on this aircraft was never completed, and it was abandoned in favour of the Avion III. Ader's later claim that he flew the Avion II in August 1892 for a distance of 100 m (330 ft) in Satory near Paris, was never widely accepted.

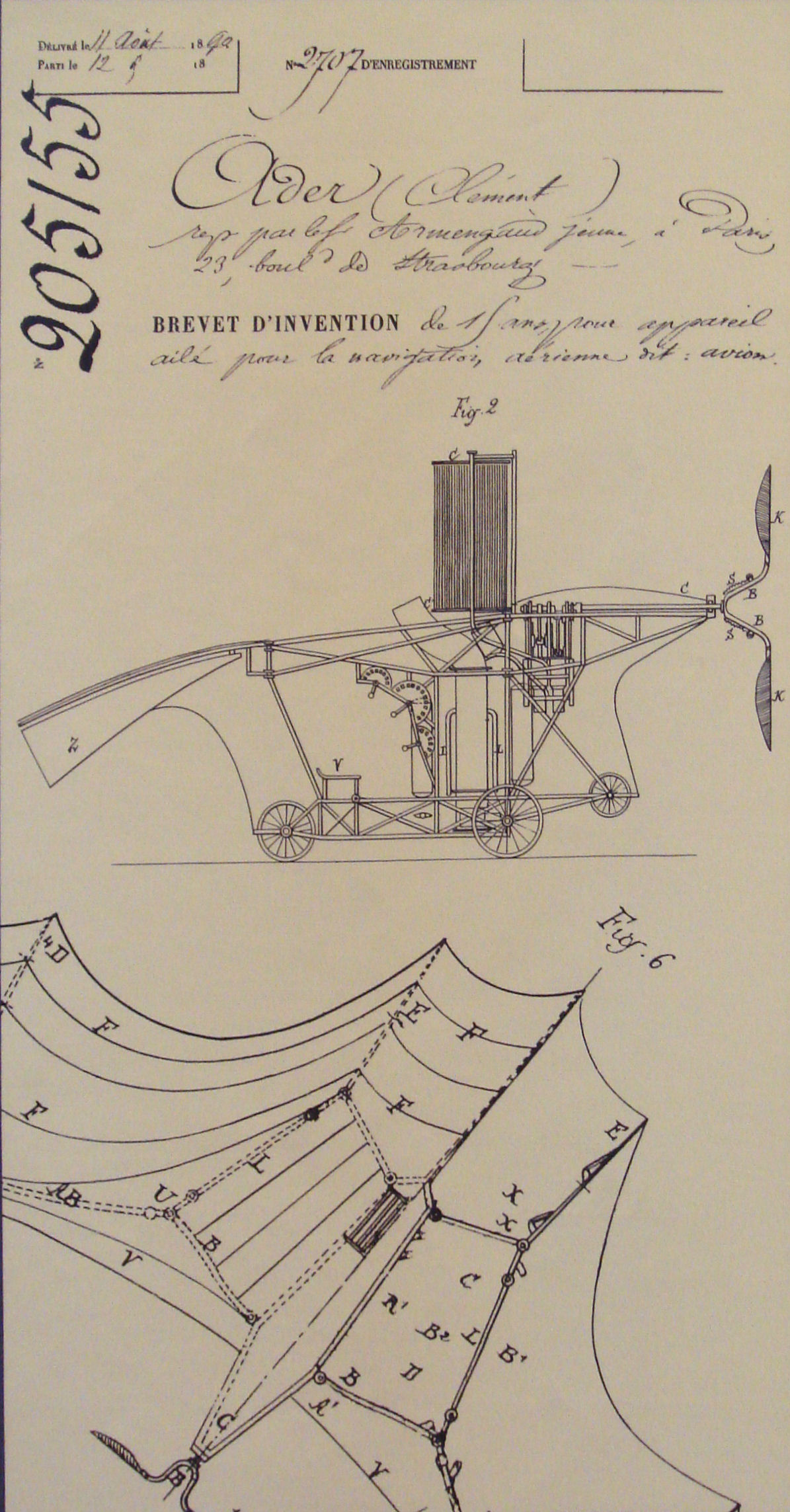
Clement Ader's Eole French patent 205155, 19 April 1890.

Ader's progress attracted the interest of the minister of war, Charles de Freycinet. With the backing of the French War Office, Ader developed and constructed the Avion III. It resembled an enormous bat made of linen and wood, with a 15 m (48 ft) wingspan, equipped with two four-bladed tractor propellers, each powered by a steam engine of 30 hp (22 kW). Using a circular track at Satory, Ader carried out taxiing trials on 12 October 1897 and two days later attempted a flight. After a short run the machine was caught by a gust of wind, slewed off the track, and came to a stop. After this the French army withdrew its funding, but kept the results secret. The commission released in November 1910 the official reports on Ader's attempted flights, stating that they were unsuccessful.

== Book on aviation ==
Clément Ader remained an active proponent of the development of aviation. In 1909 he published L'Aviation Militaire, a very popular book which went through 10 editions in the five years before the First World War. It is notable for its vision of aerial warfare and for its foreseeing the form of the modern aircraft carrier, with a flat flight deck, an island superstructure, deck elevators and a hangar bay. His idea for an aircraft carrier was relayed by the US naval attaché in Paris and was followed by the first trials in the United States in November 1910.

An airplane-carrying vessel is indispensable. These vessels will be constructed on a plan very different from what is currently used. First of all the deck will be cleared of all obstacles. It will be flat, as wide as possible without jeopardizing the nautical lines of the hull, and it will look like a landing field.

— Clément Ader, L'Aviation Militaire, 1909

== Influence ==
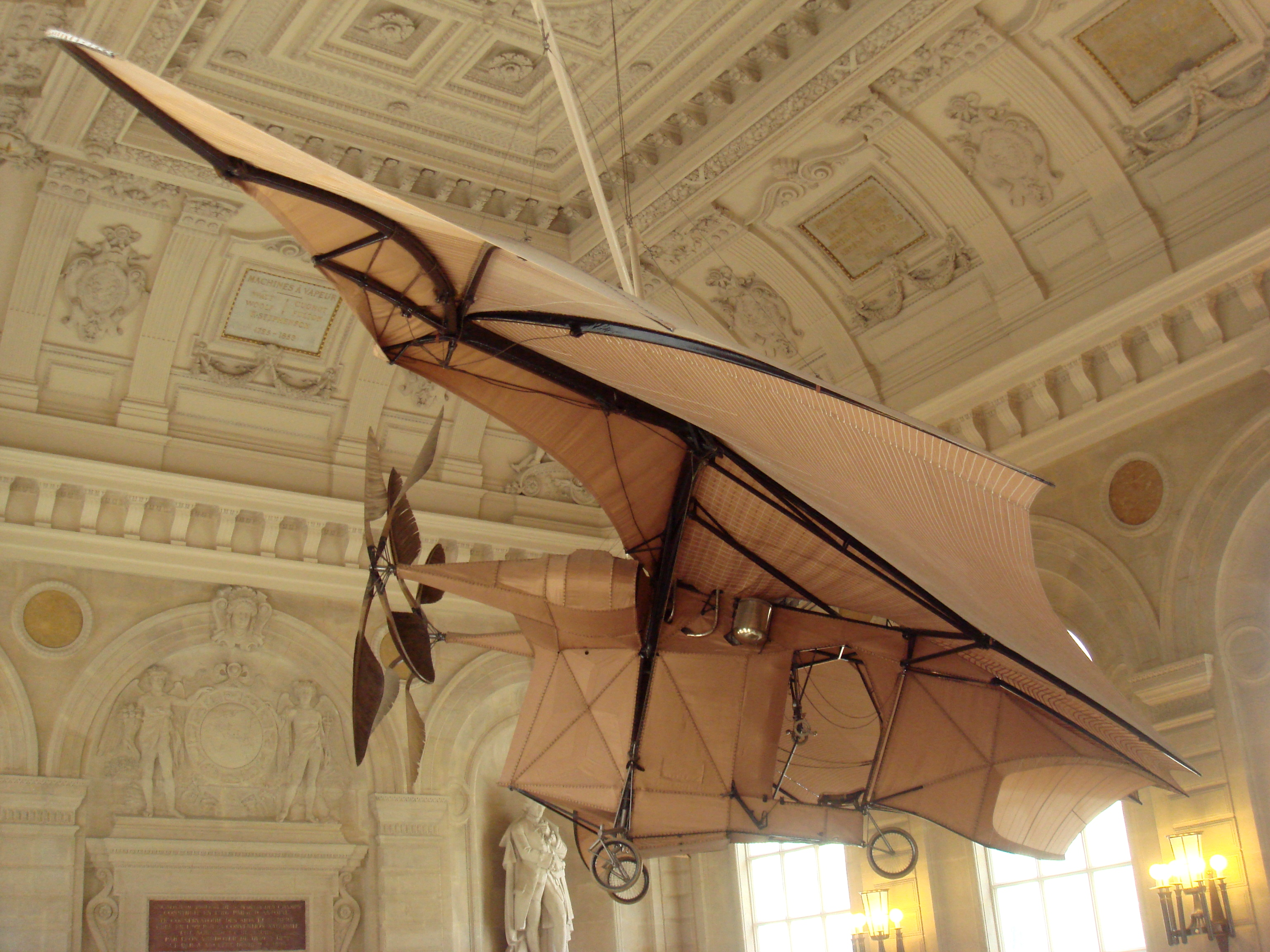
Clément Ader's Avion III is still displayed at the Musée des Arts et Métiers in Paris.

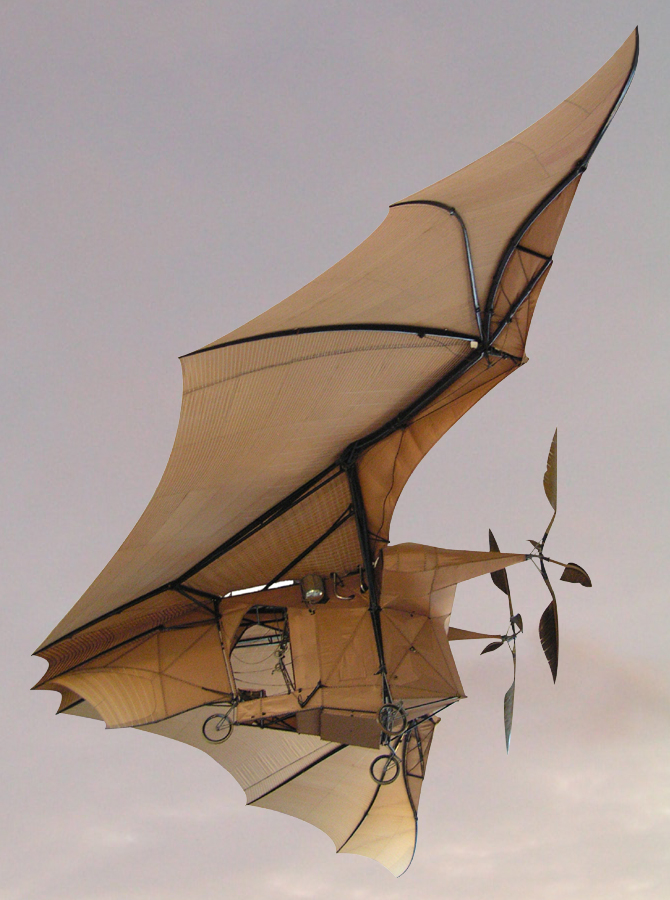
Avion III.

Ader is still admired for his early powered flight efforts, and his aircraft gave the French language the word avion for a heavier-than-air aircraft. In 1938, France issued a postage stamp honoring him. Airbus named one of its aircraft assembly sites in Toulouse after him. Clément Ader has been referred to as "the father of aviation".

== See also ==
- Early flying machines
