= ATM-grade =

In Air Traffic Management, "ATM-grade" or "ATM grade" defines a system or solution that fulfills certain requirements so that it can be used within the Air Traffic Management environment. Those requirements cover for example aspects of

- reliability: certain applications require "six nines" availability. An ATM-grade solution has to offer end-to-end availability of up to at least 99,9999% availability.
- well tested and documented: the European Air Traffic Management industry requires equipment to be developed according to specific standards and guidelines (e.g., ED-153) that allow a safety certification. Therefore, an ATM-grade solution needs to be implemented according to ED-153.

The term has been coined by EUROCONTROL to clearly state the advanced requirements of Air Traffic Management to ensure flight safety.
