= France Aviation Civile Services =

French civil aviation agency

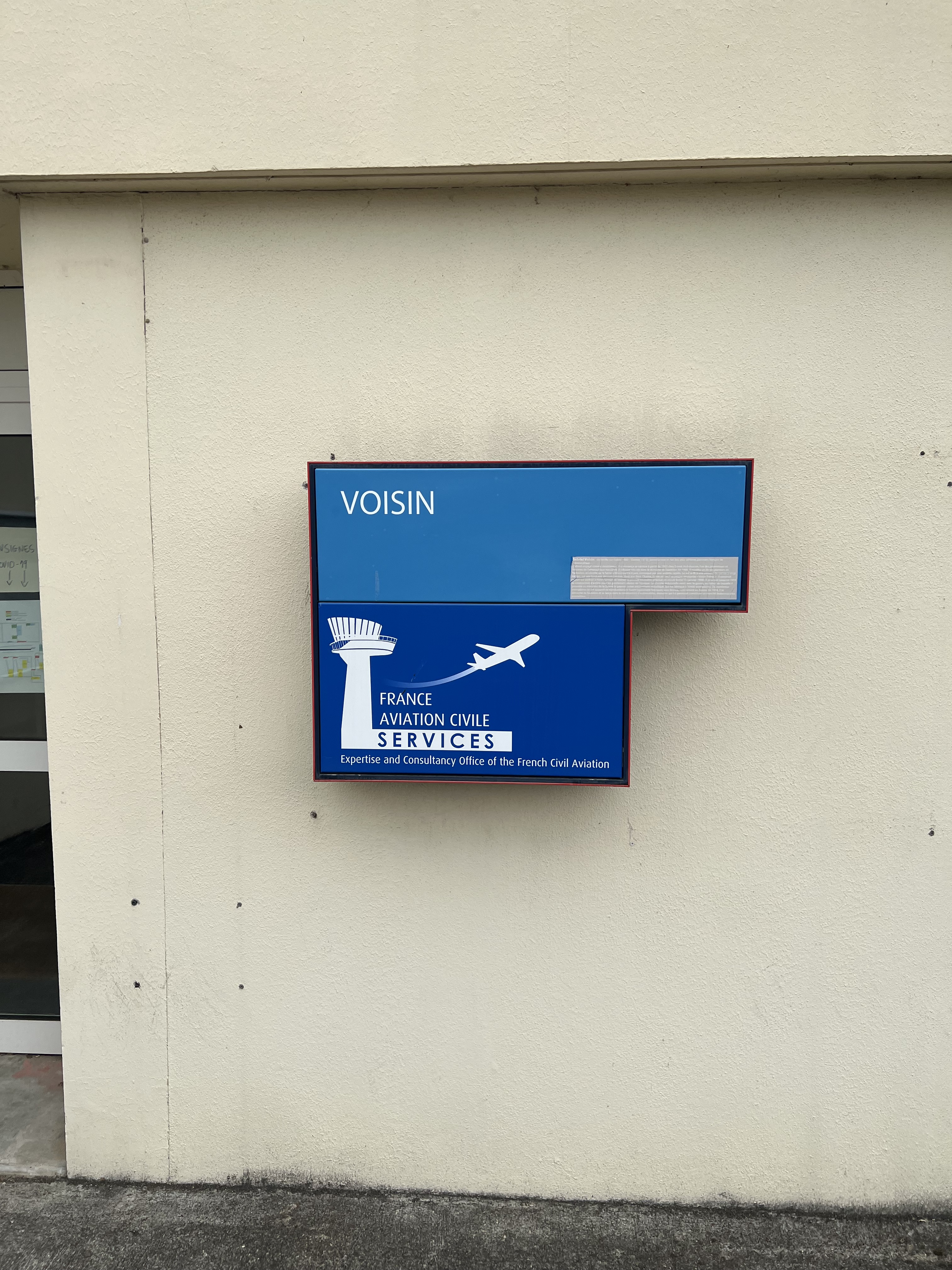
- Type: Groupement d'intérêt économique
- Industry: Air traffic control
- Founded: 2013
- Headquarters: Toulouse, France
- Area served: Worldwide
- Owner: Directorate General for Civil Aviation; École nationale de l'aviation civile
- Website: Official

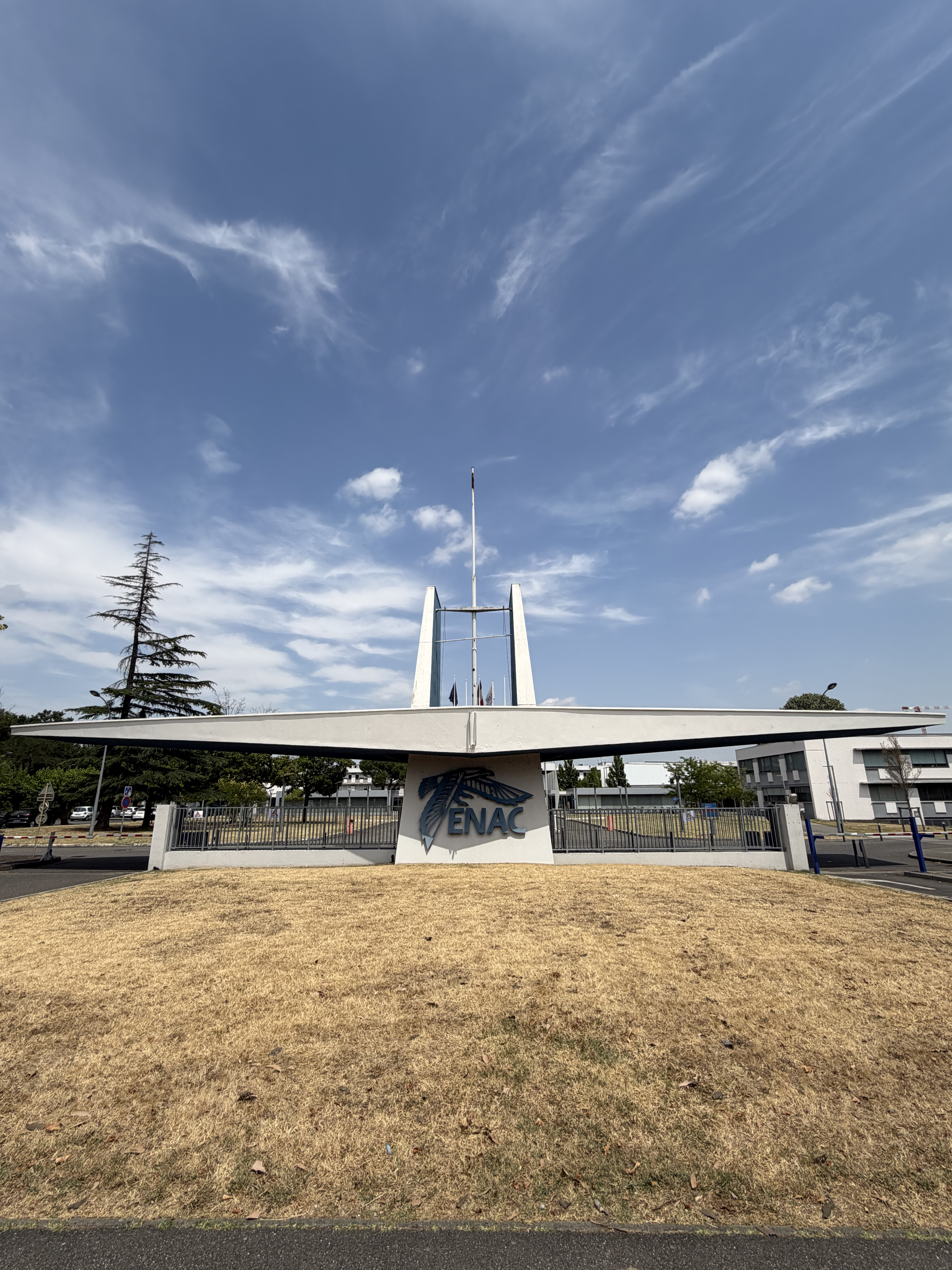
FRACS headquarters are located in those of the ENAC in Toulouse

France Aviation Civile Services, formerly DSNA Services, is a Groupement d'intérêt économique, created by the DGAC and the ENAC in 2013. It offers to international clients the expertise of French civil aviation in areas related to regulation, supervision security, and air navigation.

Its president is Mr. Farid Zizi, former president of the ICAO Air Navigation Commission.

== Activities ==
France Aviation Civile Services is involved in several types of activities: safety regulation and supervision, airspace restructuring, modernization of air navigation services... In collaboration with ENAC, it provides training for air traffic controllers. The company produces databases on airports and airlines. It also offers AFIS services.
