= Ader Éole =

Experimental steam-powered aircraft

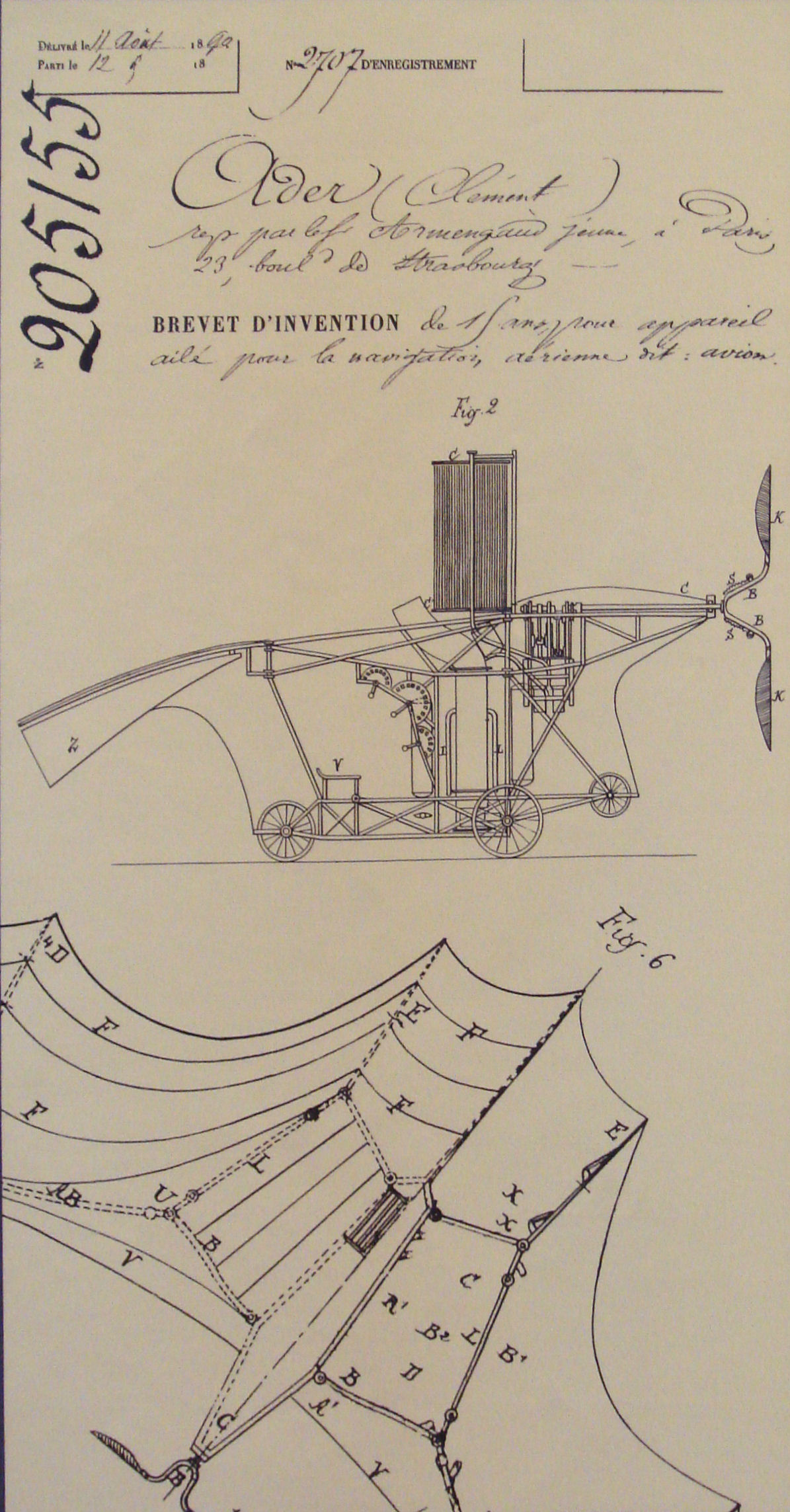
- Clément Ader's Avion French patent 205155, 19 April 1890.

General information
- Type: Pioneer aircraft
- National origin: France
- Designer: Clément Ader
- Number built: 1

The Ader Éole, also called Avion (French for aeroplane), was an early steam-powered aircraft developed by Clément Ader in the 1890s and named after the Greco-Roman wind god Aeolus.

== Design and development ==
Unlike many early flying machines, the Éole did not attempt to fly by flapping its wings, but relied on the lift generated by its wings in forward motion. With wings resembling mechanical copies of bat wings, its steam engine was an unusually light-weight design driving a propeller at the front of the aircraft, but lacking any means for the pilot to control the direction of flight.

According to late 1907 claims made by Clément Ader, on October 9th, 1890, the machine achieved a short flight of around 50 m (164 ft) at the Chateau d'Armainvilliers in Brie. It reached a height of around 20 cm (8 in). The poor power-to-weight ratio of the steam engine and bad weather were felt to limit the flying height achieved. Ader later claimed to have flown the Éole again in September 1891, this time to a distance of 100 m (328 ft), but this claim is less substantiated.

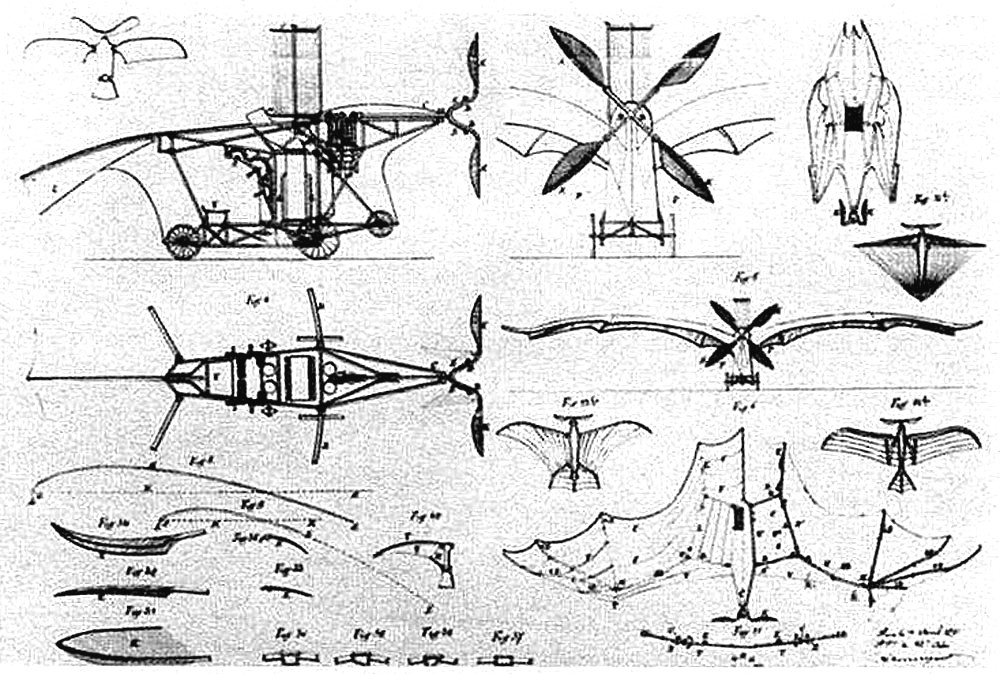
Patent drawings of Clément Ader's Eole

Some consider the Éole to have been the first true aeroplane, given that it left the ground under its own power and carried a person through the air for a short distance, and that the event of 8 October 1890 was the first successful flight. However, the lack of directional control, and the fact that steam-powered aircraft proved to be a dead end, both weigh against these claims. Ader's proponents have claimed that the Wrights' early airplanes required a catapult to take off; however, the Wrights did not use a catapult for their first flights in 1903, though they did for many flights in 1904 and later.

Modern attempts to recreate and evaluate the craft have met with mixed results. A full-size replica built in 1990 at the École Centrale Paris crashed on its first flight, injuring its pilot and leading to the termination of the experiment. Scale models, however, have been successfully flown.

== Specifications (Éole) ==
General characteristics

- Crew: 1
- Length: 6.5 m (21 ft 4 in)
- Wingspan: 14 m (45 ft 11 in)
- Wing area: 28 m^{2} (300 sq ft)
- Empty weight: 226 kg (498 lb)
- Gross weight: 330 kg (728 lb)
- Powerplant: 1 × Ader alcohol-burning steam engine, 15 kW (20 hp)

Performance

- Maximum speed: 58 km/h (36 mph, 31 kn)164 ft
- Wing loading: 8 kg/m^{2} (1.6 lb/sq ft)
- Power/mass: 0.05 kW/kg (0.03 hp/lb)

== See also ==
- Alexander Mozhaysky, a Russian inventor who also designed a steam-powered plane.
