= 1639 =

1639 in various calendars
- Gregorian calendar: 1639; MDCXXXIX
- Ab urbe condita: 2392
- Armenian calendar: 1088; ԹՎ ՌՁԸ
- Assyrian calendar: 6389
- Balinese saka calendar: 1560–1561
- Bengali calendar: 1045–1046
- Berber calendar: 2589
- English Regnal year: 14 Cha. 1 – 15 Cha. 1
- Buddhist calendar: 2183
- Burmese calendar: 1001
- Byzantine calendar: 7147–7148
- Chinese calendar: 戊寅年 (Earth Tiger); 4336 or 4129 — to — 己卯年 (Earth Rabbit); 4337 or 4130
- Coptic calendar: 1355–1356
- Discordian calendar: 2805
- Ethiopian calendar: 1631–1632
- Hebrew calendar: 5399–5400
- Hindu calendars
- Vikram Samvat: 1695–1696
- Shaka Samvat: 1560–1561
- Kali Yuga: 4739–4740
- Holocene calendar: 11639
- Igbo calendar: 639–640
- Iranian calendar: 1017–1018
- Islamic calendar: 1048–1049
- Japanese calendar: Kan'ei 16 (寛永１６年)
- Javanese calendar: 1560–1561
- Julian calendar: Gregorian minus 10 days
- Korean calendar: 3972
- Minguo calendar: 273 before ROC 民前273年
- Nanakshahi calendar: 171
- Thai solar calendar: 2181–2182
- Tibetan calendar: ས་ཕོ་སྟག་ལོ་ (male Earth-Tiger); 1765 or 1384 or 612 — to — ས་མོ་ཡོས་ལོ་ (female Earth-Hare); 1766 or 1385 or 613

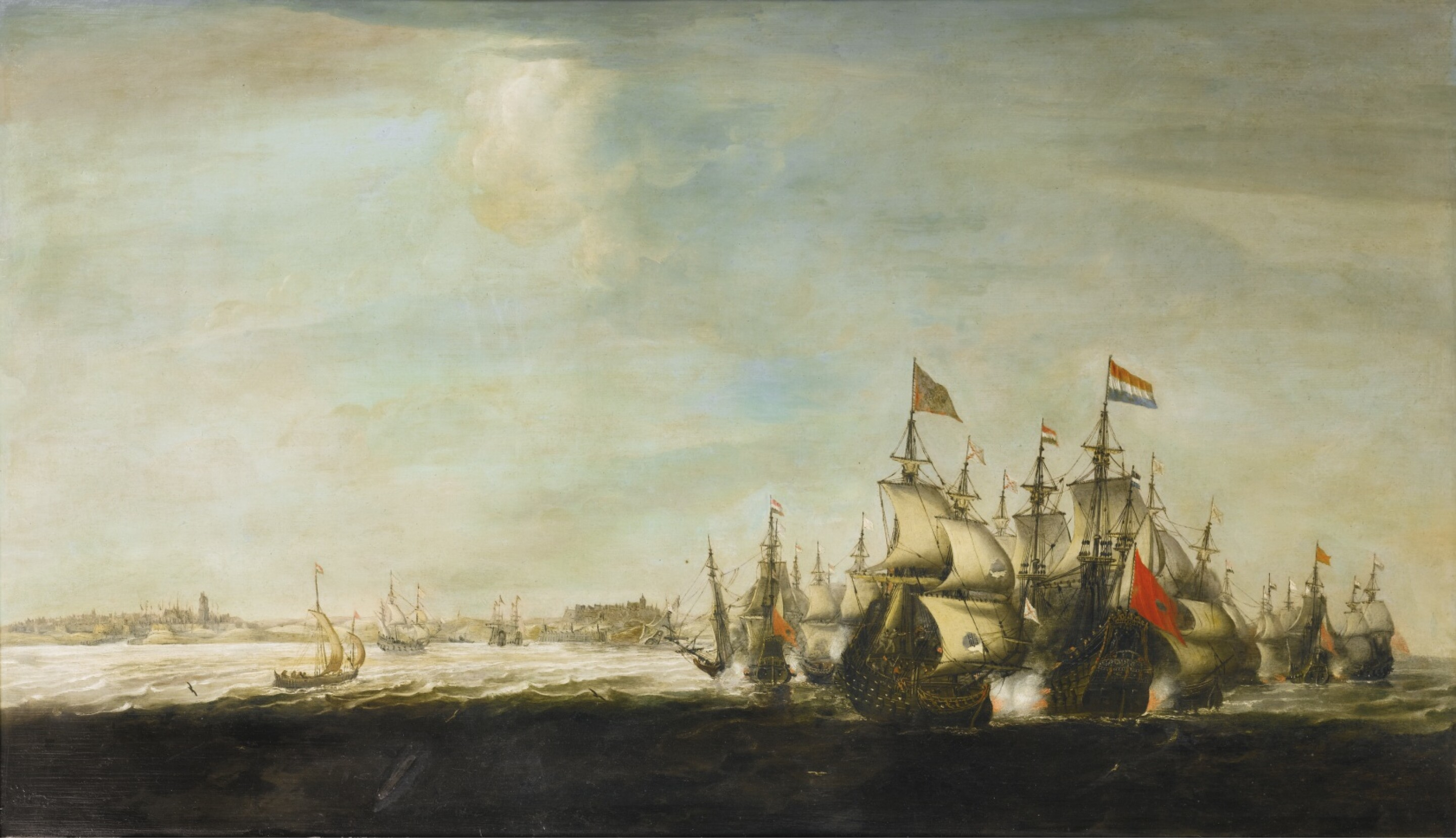
February 18: Thousands of casualties are sustained in a naval battle between Spain and the United Provinces of the Netherlands in the English Channel

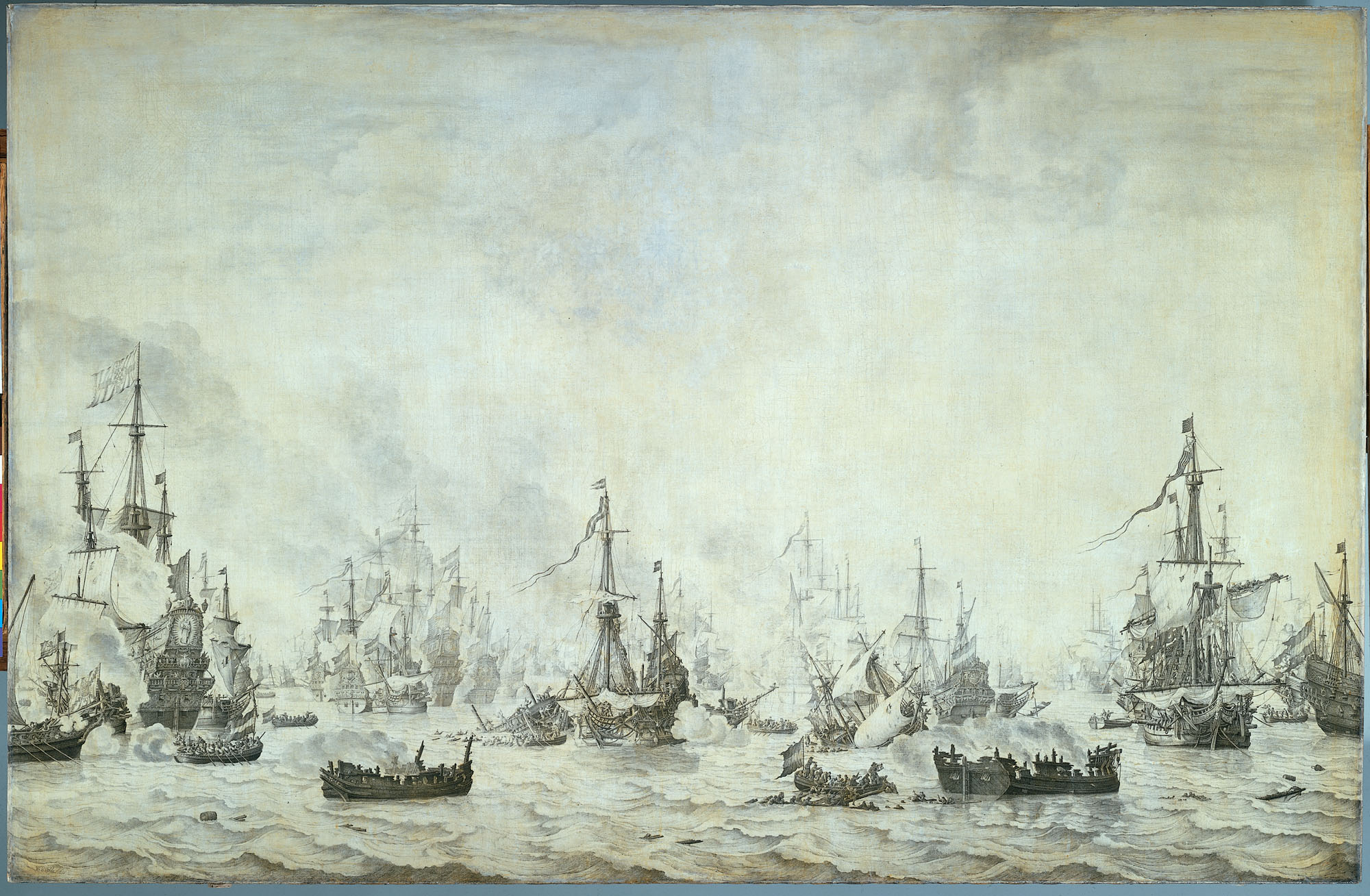
October 21: Battle of the Downs

1639 (MDCXXXIX) was a common year starting on Saturday of the Gregorian calendar and a common year starting on Tuesday of the Julian calendar, the 1639th year of the Common Era (CE) and Anno Domini (AD) designations, the 639th year of the 2nd millennium, the 39th year of the 17th century, and the 10th and last year of the 1630s decade. As of the start of 1639, the Gregorian calendar was 10 days ahead of the Julian calendar, which remained in localized use until 1923.

== Events ==
=== January–March ===
- January 19 – Hämeenlinna (Swedish: Tavastehus) is granted privileges, after it separates from the Vanaja parish, as its own city in Tavastia.
- c. January – The first printing press in British North America is started in Cambridge, Massachusetts, by Stephen Daye.
- February 18 – In the course of the Eighty Years' War, a sea battle is fought in the English Channel off of the coast of Dunkirk between the navies of the United Provinces of the Netherlands, with 12 warships, and Spain, with 12 galleons and eight other ships. The Spanish are forced to flee after three of their ships are lost and 1,600 Spaniards killed or injured, while the Dutch sustain 1,700 casualties without the loss of a ship.
- March 3 – The early settlement of Taunton, Massachusetts, is incorporated as a town.
- March 13 – Harvard University is named for clergyman John Harvard.

=== April–June ===
- April 14 – In the Battle of Chemnitz, Swedish forces under Johan Banér inflict a crushing defeat on the army of the Holy Roman Empire, prolonging the Thirty Years' War and allowing the Swedes to occupy Pirna and advance into Bohemia.
- April 22 – Pope Urban VIII issues a papal bull prohibiting slavery in the New World colonies of Spain and Portugal, encompassing most of Latin America.
- April – Italian-born Cardinal Mazarin, apostolic nuncio to Paris and adviser to Cardinal Richelieu, is naturalized French by letters patent; in December, he leaves the service of Rome to enter that of King Louis XIII of France.
- April – Following the Battle of Chemnitz Swedish forces under command of Johan Banér invades Bohemia with great success
- May 2 – After a 40-day siege, the Dutch East India Company Army captures the Trincomalee Fort on the island of Ceylon (now Sri Lanka) from the Portuguese Empire.
- May 28 – King Charles I of England arrives with his army at Berwick-upon-Tweed as the first of the Bishops' Wars breaks out between the English Army and the Scottish Covenanters.
- June 18
  - The Treaty of Berwick is signed between Charles I and the Scots.
  - On the same day, the first battle of the Bishops' Wars is fought by Earl Marischal and the Marquess of Montrose when they lead a Covenanter army of 9,000 men past Muchalls Castle over the Causey Mounth to fight at the Bridge of Dee in Scotland.

=== July–September ===
- July 1 – Parthenius I becomes the new leader of the Eastern Orthodox Christian church as he is selected as Patriarch of Constantinople, succeeding Cyril II.
- July 16 – A revolt in France begins in Normandy with the assassination of tax collector Charles Le Poupinel while he is working in the town of Avranches. The rebellion is brutally crushed on November 30.
- August 22 – The British East India Company buys a strip of land from King Peda Venkata Raya of the Vijayanagara Empire for the construction of Fort St. George, the first settlement of British India, so founding modern-day Chennai, capital city of the Indian state of Tamil Nadu (celebrated as Madras Day).
- September 3 – The alliance of cantons in Switzerland known as the Three Leagues or Raetia agrees with Spain to bring Italy's Valtellina area back into the alliance, on the condition that the Catholic faith of the natives be respected.
- September 18 – Dutch Navy Admiral Maarten Tromp introduces the line of battle tactic in a battle in the English Channel against a much larger force of Spanish Navy ships, driving off 67 ships with his fleet of 29.

=== October–December ===
- October 31 – Naval Battle of the Downs: A Republic of the United Provinces fleet decisively defeats a Spanish fleet in English waters.
- November 30 – In Normandy, the revolt of the va-nu-pieds is crushed by the troops of French Army Colonel Jean de Gassion under orders of Armand Jean du Plessis, Cardinal Richelieu, with 300 of the rebels killed.
- December 4 – English astronomer Jeremiah Horrocks makes the first successful prediction and observation of a transit of Venus.

=== Date unknown ===
- The Casiquiare canal, a river forming a natural channel between the Amazon River and Orinoco River basins, is first encountered by Europeans, an expedition led by Pedro Teixeira and Cristóbal Diatristán de Acuña.
- French nobleman Jérôme le Royer de la Dauversière obtains the seigneurial title to the island of Montreal in New France (modern-day Quebec) in the name of the Société Notre-Dame de Montréal to establish a Roman Catholic mission to evangelize indigenous peoples.
- Russian Cossacks advance over the Urals to the Pacific, to Okhotsk.
- Sakoku, the isolationist foreign policy of Japan, comes fully into effect.
  - Dejima, an island trading post off Nagasaki, becomes the only official port of trade allowed for Europeans, with the multi-national United East Indies Company (Vereenigde Oostindische Compagnie) as the only European party officially allowed. Trading parties from China, India and other places are still officially allowed, though the VOC will become the usual broker for them.
  - Japanese wives and children of Dutch and British people from Hirado are sent to Batavia (Asian headquarters of the VOC, renamed Jakarta by the Japanese around three centuries later) on Dutch ships.
- The Treaty of Zuhab is signed between the Ottoman (Turkish) Empire and Safavid Persia, delineating the modern Turkey-Iran and Iraq-Iran border lines.

== Births ==
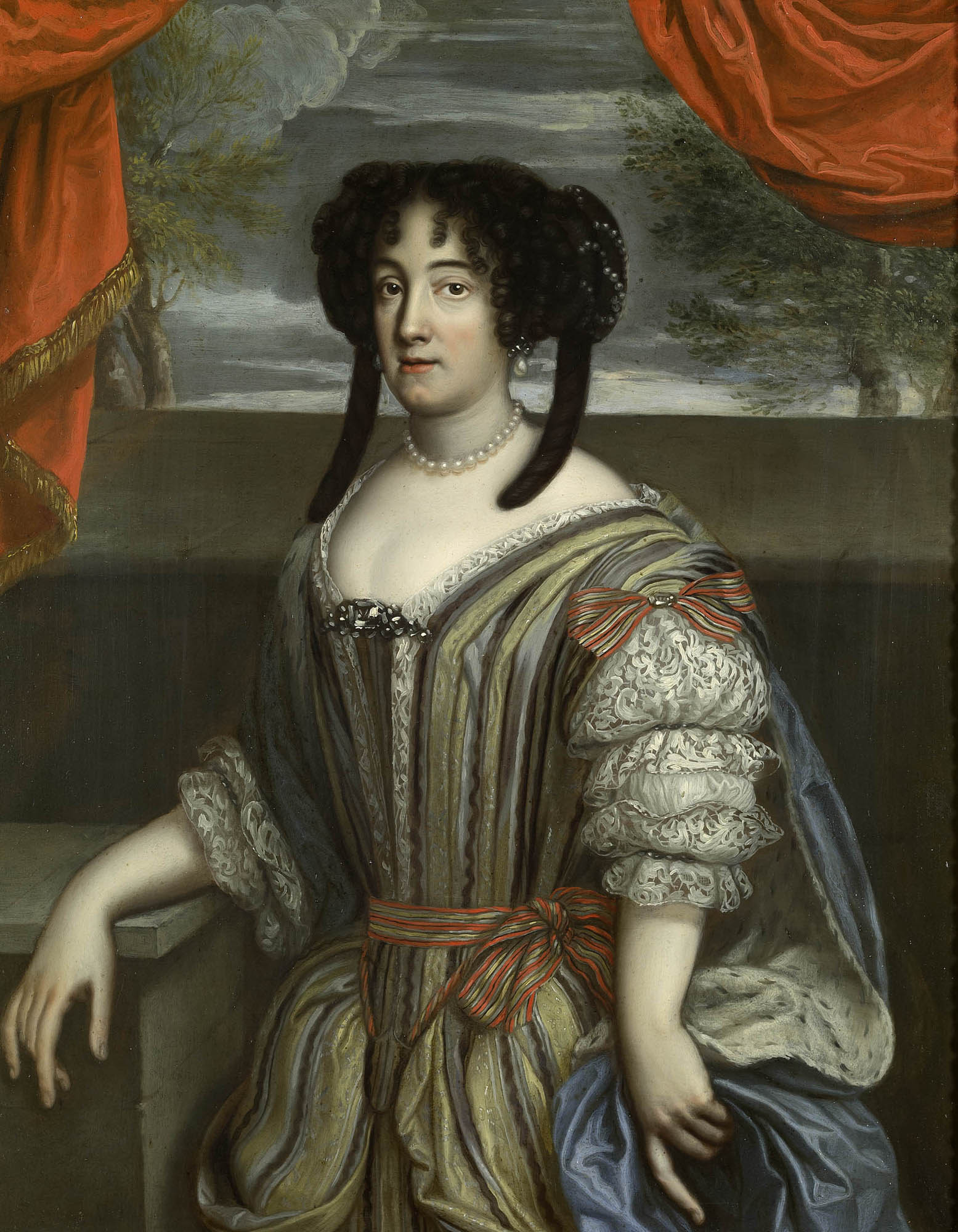
Éléonore Desmier d'Olbreuse

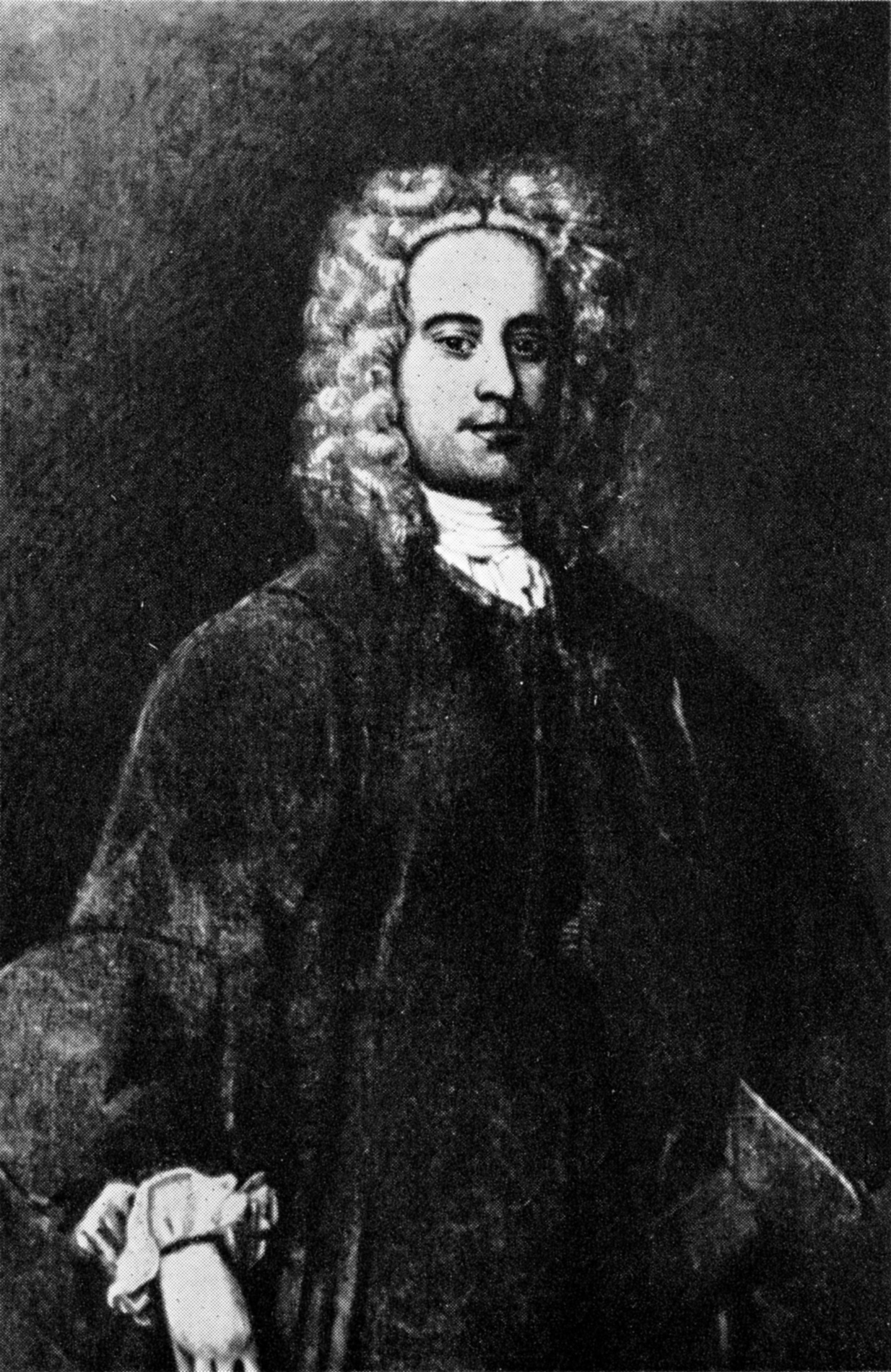
Martin Lister

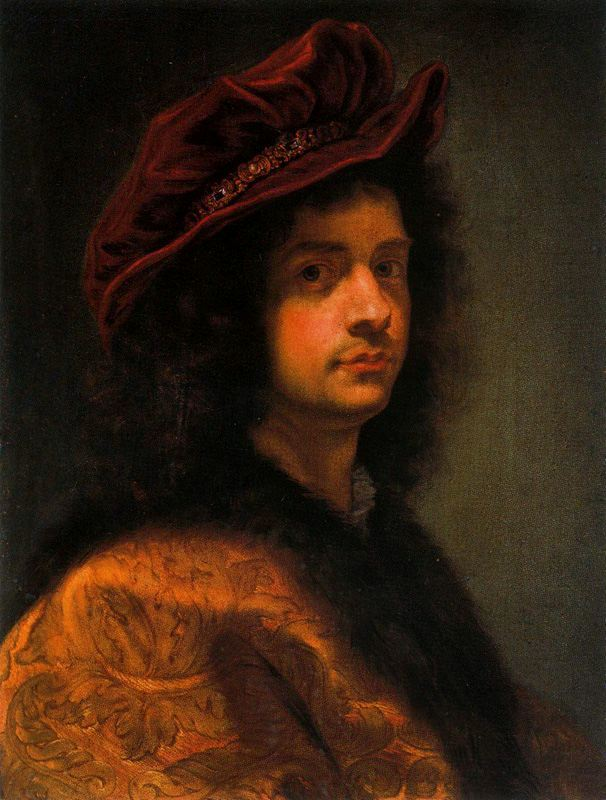
Giovanni Battista Gaulli

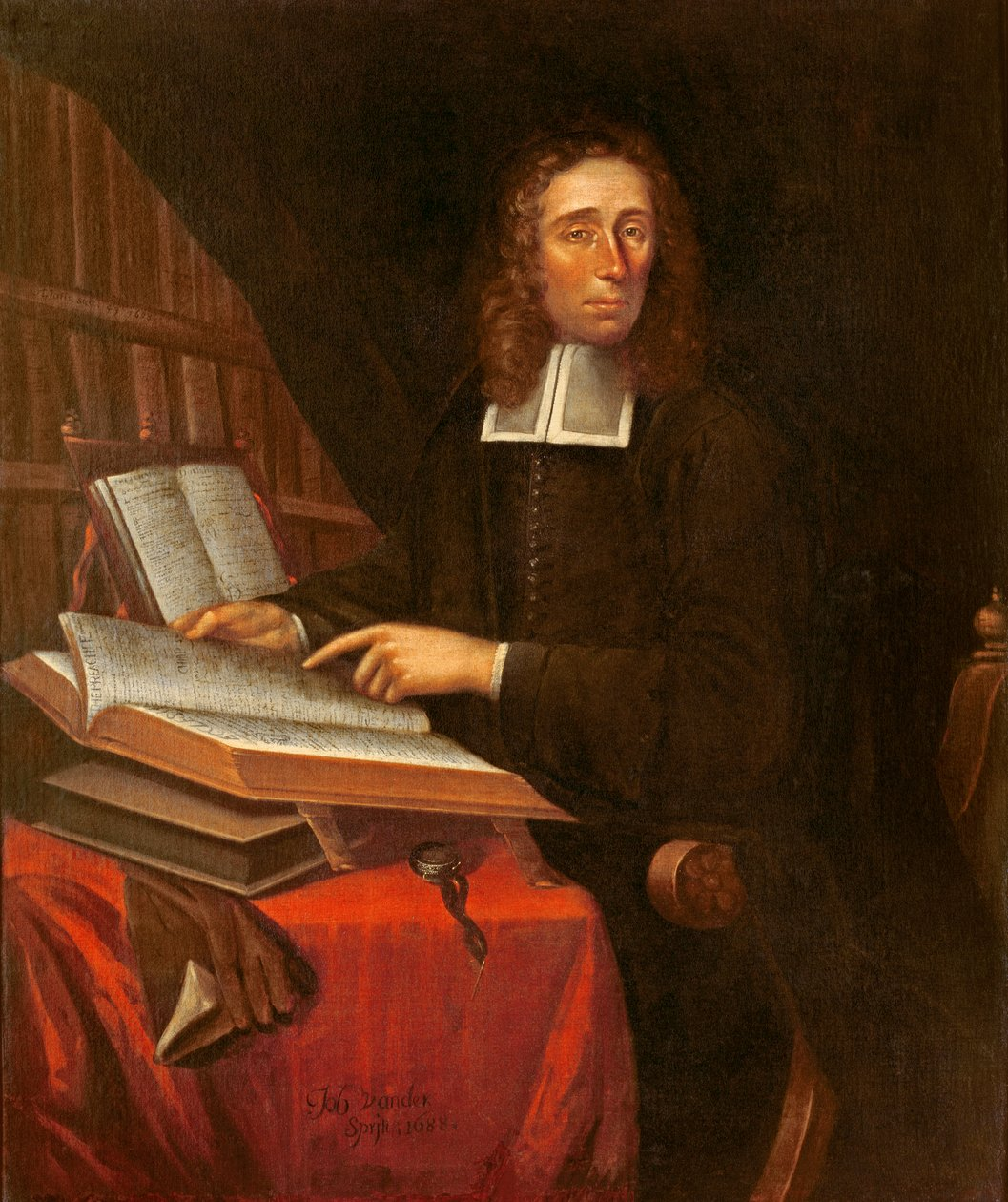
Increase Mather

=== January–March ===
- January 1
  - Jacob Knijff, Dutch painter (d. 1681)
  - Sir Thomas Spencer, 3rd Baronet, English Member of Parliament (d. 1685)
- January 3 – Éléonore Desmier d'Olbreuse, French Huguenot noblewoman, grandmother of George II of Great Britain, great-grandmother of Frederick the Great (d. 1722)
- January 5 – Otto Wilhelm Königsmarck, Swedish military officer (d. 1688)
- January 16 – John Proby, English politician (d. 1710)
- January 17 – Sir Francis Lee, 4th Baronet, English Member of Parliament (d. 1667)
- January 19 – Noël Alexandre, French theologian and ecclesiastical historian (d. 1724)
- January 20 – Hungerford Dunch, English politician (d. 1680)
- January 29 – Gover Le Buen, Dutch revolutionary fighter (d. 1712)
- January 31 – Duke Bernhard of Schleswig-Holstein-Sonderburg-Plön, German-Danish general (d. 1676)
- February 4 – Alessandro Melani, Italian composer (d. 1703)
- February 6 – Daniel Georg Morhof, German writer and scholar (d. 1691)
- February 12 – Juan García de Salazar, Spanish Baroque composer (d. 1710)
- February 17 – Claude Estiennot de la Serre, French historian (d. 1699)
- February 27 – Adriaen van Bloemen, Flemish painter, printmaker, draughtsman and engraver (d. 1697)
- March 7 – Charles Stewart, 3rd Duke of Richmond, English nobleman (d. 1672)
- March 20 – Ivan Mazepa, Hetman of Ukraine (d. 1709)
- March 30 – Elanor Allerton, English-born American colonist (d. 1674)

=== April–June ===
- April 3 – Alessandro Stradella, Italian composer (k. 1682)
- April 12 – Martin Lister, English naturalist and physician (d. 1712)
- April 13 – Joan Leonardsz Blasius, Dutch writer (d. 1672)
- April 16 – Alessandro Baratta, Italian painter, engraver (d. 1714)
- April 24 – Johann Benedict Carpzov II, German theologian (d. 1699)
- April 29 – François Nepveu, French Jesuit writer on ascetical subjects (d. 1708)
- May 8 – Giovanni Battista Gaulli, Italian artist working in the High Baroque and early Rococo periods (d. 1709)
- May 10 – Peleg Sanford, Rhode Island colonial governor (d. 1701)
- May 19 – Charles Weston, 3rd Earl of Portland, English nobleman (d. 1665)
- May 27 – Laura Martinozzi, Duchess consort of Modena (d. 1687)
- June 21 – Increase Mather, American minister (d. 1723)

=== July–September ===
- July 8 – John Vaughan, 3rd Earl of Carbery, English politician and Irish nobleman (d. 1713)
- July 15 – Richard Butler, 1st Earl of Arran, Irish soldier (d. 1686)
- August 18 – William Lowther, English landowner and politician (d. 1705)
- August 28 – Marie Mancini, Italian courtier, third of the five Mancini sisters (d. 1715)
- August 30 – Cornelia van der Veer, Dutch poet (d. 1704)
- September 7 – David Martin, French theologian (d. 1721)
- September 8 – William Trumbull, English diplomat and politician (d. 1716)
- September 17 – Hans Herr, Swiss-born Mennonite bishop (d. 1725)
- September 21 – Robbert Duval, painter from the Northern Netherlands (d. 1732)
- September 29
  - William Russell, Lord Russell, English politician (d. 1683)
  - Sir John Seton, 1st Baronet of Nova Scotia (d. 1686)

=== October–December ===
- October 14 – Simon van der Stel, last Commander and first Governor of the Cape Colony (d. 1712)
- October 17 – Charles-Claude Genest, French dramatist and playwright (d. 1719)
- November 17 – Eleazer Kimberly, Secretary of the State of Connecticut (d. 1709)
- November 21 – Fortunatus Hueber, German Franciscan historian and theologian (d. 1706)
- December 3 – Isidoro de Atondo y Antillon, Spanish admiral (d. 1689)
- December 18 – Gottfried Kirch, German astronomer, first 'Astronomer Royal' in Berlin (d. 1710)
- December 22 – Jean Racine, French dramatist (d. 1699)
- December 28 – Dirk van Bleiswijk, Dutch politician, writer (d. 1681)
- December 29 – Muhammad Sultan, Mughal Empire emperor (d. 1676)

=== Date unknown ===
- Yair Bacharach, German rabbi (d. 1702)
- Consort Donggo, concubine of the Shunzhi Emperor of the Qing Dynasty (d. 1660)
- Dirck Ferreris, Dutch painter (d. 1693)
- Caspar Netscher, Dutch painter (d. 1684)
- Samuel Peterson, early Swedish settler of New Sweden, founder of modern-day Wilmington (d. 1689)

== Deaths ==
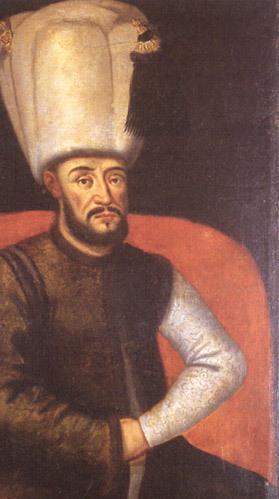
Mustafa I

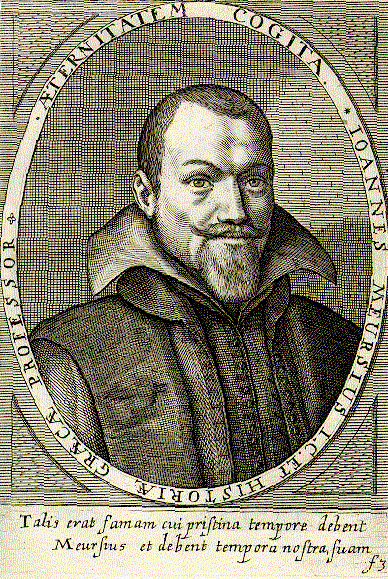
Johannes Meursius

- January – Shackerley Marmion, English dramatist (b. 1603)
- January 14 – Sophie of Brunswick-Lüneburg, Margrave of Brandenburg-Ansbach and Brandenburg-Kulmbach, Duchess of Hunters Village (b. 1563)
- January 20 – Mustafa I, Ottoman Sultan (b. 1592)
- January 23 – Francisco Maldonado da Silva, Peruvian Jewish poet (b. 1592)
- January 24 – Georg Jenatsch, Swiss politician (b. 1596)
- February 5 – Augusta of Denmark, Duchess Consort of Holstein-Gottorp (b. 1580)
- March 16 – Pieter de Neyn, Dutch painter (b. 1597)
- April 1 – Johann Philipp, Duke of Saxe-Altenburg, German Duke (b. 1597)
- April 2 – Nicolaes Olycan, Dutch businessman (b. 1599)
- April 6
  - Berlinghiero Gessi, Italian Catholic cardinal (b. 1563)
  - John Matthew Rispoli, major Maltese philosopher of great erudition (b. 1582)
- April 9 – Albret Skeel, State Admiral of Denmark (b. 1572)
- May 13 – Peter Lauremberg, German writer and professor (b. 1585)
- May 21 – Tommaso Campanella, Italian theologian and poet (b. 1568)
- June 1 – Melchior Franck, German composer (b. c. 1579)
- June 6 – Peter Crüger, German astronomer and mathematician (b. 1580)
- July 18 – Bernard of Saxe-Weimar, German general (b. 1604)
- August 4 – Juan Ruiz de Alarcón, Mexican dramatist (b. c. 1571)
- August 6 – Hans van Steenwinckel the Younger, Danish architect (b. 1587)
- August 20 – Martin Opitz von Boberfeld, German poet (b. 1597)
- August 21 – Henry Wenceslaus, Duke of Oels-Bernstadt, Duke of Bernstadt (1617–1639) (b. 1592)
- September 20 – Johannes Meursius, Dutch classical scholar (b. 1579)
- September 28 – Louis de Nogaret de La Valette, French Catholic Cardinal (b. 1593)
- October 8 – Frances Howard, Duchess of Richmond, British duchess (b. 1578)
- October 28 – Stefano Landi, Italian composer (b. 1587)
- November 3 – Martin de Porres, Peruvian monk, Roman Catholic saint (b. 1579)
- November 4 – Thomas Finch, 2nd Earl of Winchilsea, Member of Parliament (b. 1578)
- November 7 – Thomas Arundell, 1st Baron Arundell of Wardour, English politician (b. c. 1560)
- November 8 – Richard Knightley, English politician (b. 1593)
- November 26 – John Spottiswoode, Scottish archbishop and historian (b. 1565)
- December 15 – Muzio Oddi, Italian mathematician (b. 1569)
- December 17 – Nils Turesson Bielke, Swedish politician (b. 1569)
- December 25 – John Christian of Brieg, Duke of Brzeg (b. 1591)
- Date unknown – Madeleine du Fargis, French courtier
- Approximate date – John Ford, English dramatist (b. 1586)
