= 1639 in France =

- Decades: 1610s; 1620s; 1630s; 1640s; 1650s
- See also: History of France; Timeline of French history; List of years in France

Events from the year 1639 in France.

== Incumbents ==
- Monarch – Louis XIII

== Events ==
=== January–June ===
- January 7 – Croquant rebellions in Gascony: Having freed prisoners in Mirande on January 4, rebels of Pardiac ransack the area when the townspeople refuse them the passage of their bridge to march on Auch.
- February 12 – Polish prince John II Casimir Vasa, future king of Poland, accused of plotting with Spain against France, is imprisoned, by order of Cardinal Richelieu, in the dungeon of the citadel of Sisteron.
- February 14 – Writers Jacques Esprit François de La Mothe Le Vayer are elected to the Académie française.
- February 17 – Ballet de cour staged at the Château de Saint-Germain-en-Laye on the theme of the happy birth last year of the Dauphin.
- February 18 – Naval action of 18 February 1639 off Dunkirk (at this time part of the Spanish Netherlands). Although the Spanish squadron is obliged to put back into port, the Dutch are forced to call off their blockade.
- March 24 – The Dutch Republic renews its alliance with France.
- April – Italian-born Cardinal Mazarin, apostolic nuncio to Paris and adviser to Cardinal Richelieu, is naturalized French by letters patent; in December, he leaves the service of Rome to enter that of Louis XIII.

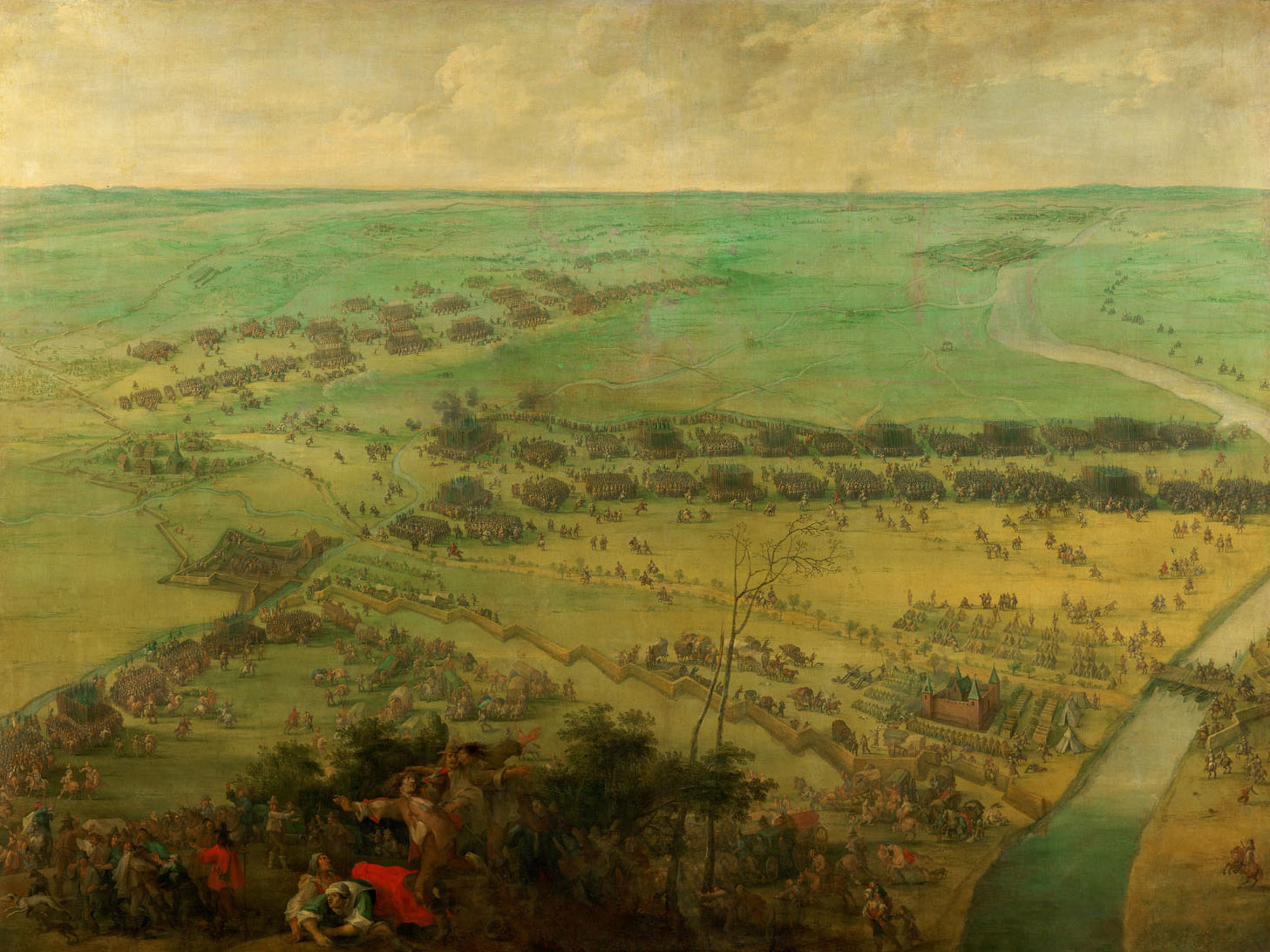
Relief of Thionville depicted by Peter Snayers

- June 6–7 – Relief of Thionville: The Spanish under Ottavio Piccolomini secure a decisive victory over the French led by Isaac Manasses de Pas, Marquis de Feuquieres, who is mortally wounded (dying in 1640), at Thionville.
- June 18 – The Conseil delivers a judgment intended to remedy non-payment of dues for the daily transport of wine in the Paris suburbs. Unrest breaks out in support of the wine-carriers.
- June 29 – Charles de La Porte takes Hesdin in the king’s presence.
- June–October – Dry summer in the Loire Valley and in Brittany.

=== July–December ===
- July 16
  - Charles de Poupinel, lieutenant particulier of the bailiwick of Coutances, is assassinated at Avranches.
  - Revolt of the va-nu-pieds begins in Normandy against the gabelle, suppressed by Michel Le Tellier, Pierre Séguier and Omer Talon (continues into 1640).
- July 19 – First Siege of Salses ends after 40 days when Henri, Prince of Condé, takes Salses from the Spanish, giving access to the province of Roussillon.
- August
  - Antoine Le Maistre, leader of the ascetic Solitaires of Port-Royal, returns to the abbey of Port-Royal-des-Champs.
  - Having set sail on May 4 from Dieppe, establishment of the Ursulines of Quebec and the École des Ursulines, Quebec in New France is begun by the French Ursuline nun Marie of the Incarnation and laywoman Marie-Madeleine de Chauvigny de la Peltrie.
- August 13–26 – Urban anti-tax riots at Rouen (August 20–21), Bayeux (August 25) and Caen (August 13–14 and 26–27).
- September 12 – Jean du Vergier de Hauranne, Jansenist Abbé of Saint-Cyran, publishes Théologie familière, ou Instruction de ce que le Chrétien doit croire et faire en cette vie pour être sauvé in Paris.
- September 15 – Imprisoned Polish prince John Casimir Vasa is transferred from Sisteron to the dungeon of the Château de Vincennes.
- September 19 – Start of the second Siege of Salses, by the Spanish (ends 6 January 1640).
- September 20 – Early harvest in Dijon.
- September 27 – Cardinal Richelieu has an equestrian statue of Louis XIII (sculpted by Pierre Biard le jeune with the horse by Daniele da Volterra) erected in the Place royale in Paris.
- October 18 – Appearance of maize ("Spanish millet") in the market at Toulouse. It is available between 1644 and 1655.
- October – An epidemic of dysentery breaks out, following the drought in Anjou.
- November – Jesuit settlement of Sainte-Marie among the Hurons in New France established by Fathers Jérôme Lalemant and Jean de Brébeuf.
- November 30 – Revolt of the va-nu-pieds is suppressed before Avranches by royal troops directed by Jean de Gassion.
- Before December 22 – Georges de La Tour becomes painter in ordinary to the king.
- December 22 – Birth at La Ferté-Milon of dramatist Jean Racine.

=== Undated ===
- Cardinal Richelieu suspends the États provinciaux of Provence after they refuse to register fiscal edicts. They are replaced by an Assemblée des communautés which brings together only representatives of the Third Estate.
- French nobleman Jérôme le Royer de la Dauversière obtains the seigneurial title to the island of Montreal in New France in the name of the Société Notre-Dame de Montréal to establish a Roman Catholic mission to evangelize indigenous peoples.
- Blaise Pascal's family move to Rouen.
- Establishment of the Hugel & Fils and Maison Trimbach wineries in Riquewihr, Alsace.

== Births ==
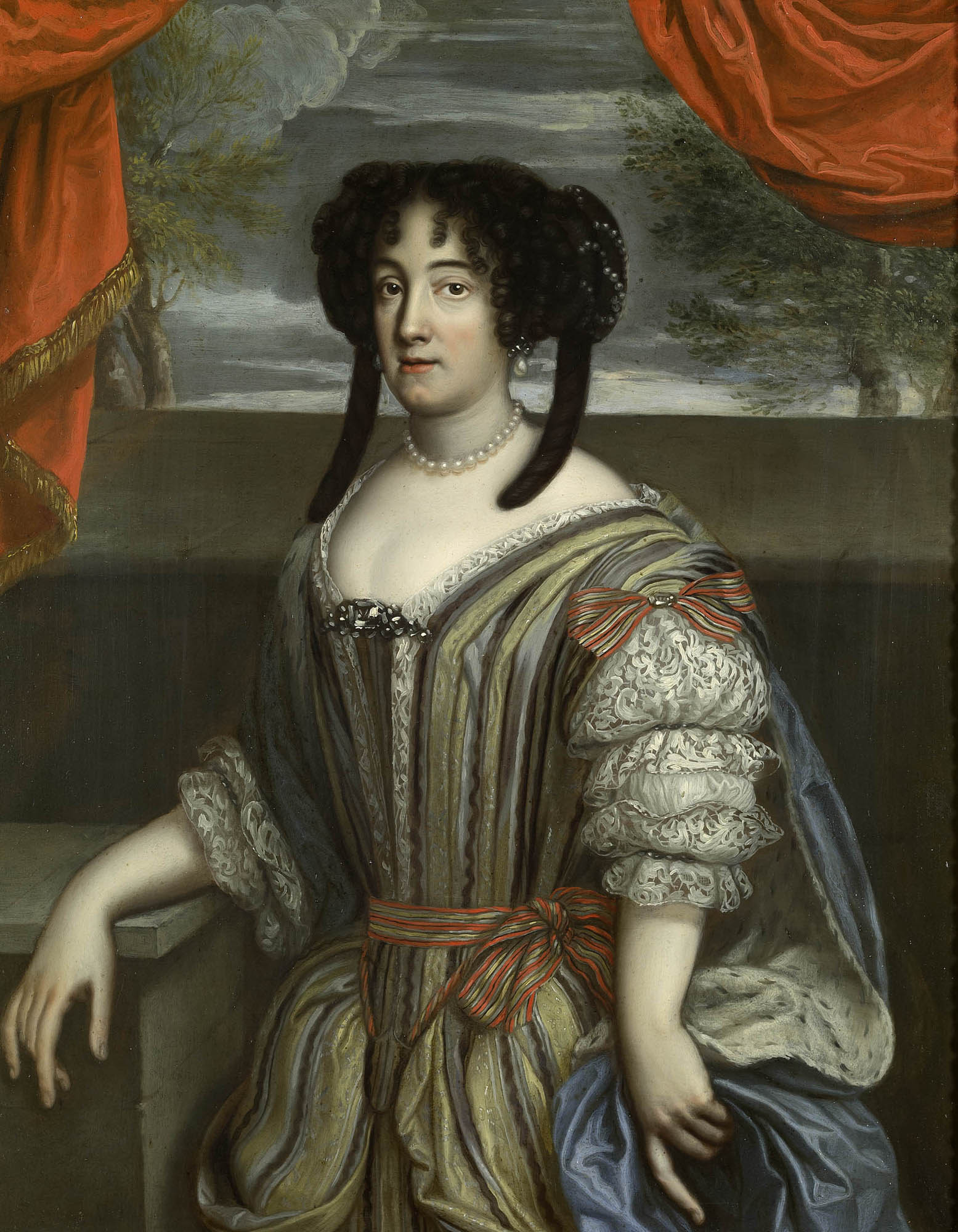
Éléonore Desmier d'Olbreuse

- January 3 – Éléonore Desmier d'Olbreuse, Huguenot noblewoman and royal matriarch (died 1722)
- January 19 – Noël Alexandre, theologian and ecclesiastical historian (died 1724)
- February 17 – Claude Estiennot de la Serre, Benedictine historian (died 1699)
- April 29 – François Nepveu, Jesuit writer on ascetical subjects (died 1708)
- September 7 – David Martin, Protestant theologian (died 1721)
- October 17 – Charles-Claude Genest, poet, dramatist and clergyman (died 1719)
- December 22 – Jean Racine, dramatist (died 1699)
- Undated
  - Claude Audran the Younger, painter (died 1684)
  - Catherine Charlotte de Gramont, niece of Richelieu, princess consort of Monaco and a mistress of Louis XIV (died 1678)
  - César Vichard de Saint-Réal, writer (died 1692)
- Approximate date
  - Guillaume Amfrye de Chaulieu, poet and wit (died 1720)
  - Louis de Chastillon, painter in enamel and miniature and engraver (died 1734)
  - Daniel Greysolon, Sieur du Lhut, soldier and explorer of North America (died 1710)
  - Marie Vigoreaux, fortune-teller and poisoner (killed 1679)

== Deaths ==
- July 4 – Étienne Binet, Jesuit author (born 1569)
- September 28 – Louis de Nogaret de La Valette, Cardinal and lieutenant general in the French Army (born 1593)
- Undated – Madeleine du Fargis, courtier
