= Gover =

Gover is both a surname and a given name. Notable people with the name include:

Surname:

- Alf Gover (1908–2001), English cricketer
- Janet Gover, Australian writer
- Michael Gover (1913–1987), English actor
- Paul Gover (born 1968), English cricketer
- Roy Henry Gover (1929–2003), British painter and composer
- Robert Gover (1929–2015), American journalist and novelist
- Victor M. Gover (1908–1970), British film director

Given name:

- Gover Le Buen (1639–1712), fighter in the Franco-Dutch War

== See also ==
- Grover (given name)
