= Grover (disambiguation) =

Grover is a Muppet character on the children's television show Sesame Street.

Grover may also refer to:

== People ==
- Grover (given name)
- Grover (surname)

== Place names ==
=== United States ===
- Grover, Colorado, town
- Grover, Kansas, unincorporated community
- Grover, Minnesota, abandoned town
- Grover, Nebraska, unincorporated community
- Grover, North Carolina, town
- Grover, South Carolina, unincorporated community
- Grover, South Dakota, unincorporated community
- Grover, Utah, unincorporated community
- Grover, Wisconsin (disambiguation), several places
- Grover, Wyoming, a census designated place
- Grover Beach, California
- Grovertown, Indiana, unincorporated community

== Other uses ==
- GROVER, 2013 rover prototype of NASA used for Earth-bound projects
- Grover's algorithm, quantum search of an unsorted database invented by Lov Grover
- Grover's disease, common skin disease
- Grover Musical Products, Inc., manufacturer of accessories for guitars, banjos and other stringed instruments

== See also ==
- Grover's Mill, New Jersey, part of West Windsor Township, New Jersey, and site of the fictitious Martian landing of Orson Welles's 1938 War of the Worlds radio program
- Grover Shoe Factory disaster, 1905 boiler explosion and fire that killed 58
- Our Town, play by Thornton Wilder set in the fictional town of Grover's Corners
