= Grover (given name) =

Grover is a masculine given name.

== Origin ==
Grover first became popular as a given name in the United States during the 1880s and 1890s, mirroring the popularity of President Grover Cleveland, part of a long-standing American trend of naming babies after presidents. Cleveland's official given name was Stephen; he was named after Stephen Grover, a former minister at the church his parents attended. However, from childhood, Cleveland's friends addressed him by his middle name instead, and so what was originally the surname Grover became a given name. According to Social Security Administration data, the given name Grover increased in frequency by 850 per 100,000 births in the United States between November 1883 and November 1884 (the month when Cleveland won his first presidential election), and spiked again after he won the 1892 election. It later declined in popularity, and had fallen off the top 1,000 given names for boys in the United States by the 1970s. One notable modern usage is for Grover the Muppet on the television show Sesame Street.

== People ==
=== Government and politics ===
- Grover Cleveland (1837–1908), 22nd and 24th president of the United States
- Grover M. Moscowitz (1886–1947), judge on the US District Court for the Eastern District of New York
- Grover Ramstack (1886–1948), member of the Wisconsin State Assembly
- Grover Whalen (1886–1962), commissioner of the New York City Police
- Grover C. Winn (1886–1943), speaker of the Alaska House of Representatives
- Grover C. Dillman (1889–1979), Michigan State Highway Commissioner
- Grover L. Broadfoot (1892–1962), chief justice of the Wisconsin Supreme Court
- Grover A. Giles (1892–1974), attorney-general of Utah
- Grover Sellers (1892–1980), attorney-general of Texas
- Grover C. George (1893–1976), American farmer and politician
- Grover C. Richman Jr. (1911–1983), attorney-general of New Jersey
- Grover Holmes Braddock (1925–2025), American politician
- Grover J. Rees III (born 1951), American judge and diplomat
- Grover Norquist (born 1956), founder of Americans for Tax Reform

=== Sports ===
- Grover Land (1884–1958), American baseball catcher
- Grover Fuller (1885–1928), American jockey
- Grover Lowdermilk (1885–1968), American baseball pitcher
- Grover Cleveland Alexander (1887–1950), American baseball pitcher
- Grover Baichley (1888–1956), American baseball pitcher
- Grover Gilmore (baseball) (1888–1919), American baseball right fielder
- Grover Hartley (1888–1964), American baseball catcher
- Grover Washabaugh (1892–1973), American basketball coach
- Grover Malone (1895–1950), American National Football League player
- Grover Seitz (1907–1957), American Minor League Baseball player
- Grover Resinger (1916–1986), American baseball coach
- Grover Froese (1916–1982), American baseball umpire
- Grover Klemmer (1921–2015), American sprinter and National Football League referee
- Grover Nutt (1921–2012), American college football coach
- Bud Delp (Grover Greer Delp; 1932–2006), American racehorse trainer
- Grover Powell (1940–1985), American baseball pitcher
- Raz Reid (Grover Reid; born 1950), American tennis player
- Grover Covington (born 1956), Canadian Football League defensive end
- Grover Wiley (born 1974), American middleweight boxer
- Grover Gibson (born 1978), American association football midfielder in Germany's 2. Bundesliga
- Grover Harmon (born 1989), Cook Islands association football midfielder
- Grover Stewart (born 1993), American National Football League nose tackle

=== Scholars ===
- Grover Simcox (1867–1966), American naturalist illustrator
- Grover Powers (1887–1968), American physician, director of the Yale University Department of Pediatrics
- Grover E. Murray (1916–2003), American geologist
- Grover C. Stephens (1925–2003), American marine biologist
- Grover Krantz (1931–2002), American anthropologist and cryptozoologist
- Grover Hutchins (1933–2010), American pathologist
- Grover Furr (born 1944), American professor of medieval English literature
- Grover C. Gilmore (born 1950), American psychologist
- Grover Whitehurst, American education researcher

=== Other ===
- Grover S. Wormer (1821–1904), Union Army general during the US Civil War
- G. C. Brewer (Grover Cleveland Brewer; 1884–1956), American Christian leader
- Grover C. Womack (1885–1956), American businessman in Louisiana
- Grover C. Hall (1888–1941), American newspaper editor in Alabama
- Grover Loening (1888–1976), American aviation pioneer and aircraft designer
- Grover Clark (1891–1938), American journalist in China and Japan
- Grover Clinton Tyler (1892–1966), American aeronautical pioneer and US Postal Service airmail pilot
- Grover Cleveland Bergdoll (1893–1966), American heir and World War I draft dodger
- Grover Jones (1893–1940), American actor
- Grover C. Nash (1911–1970), American pilot, first black man to fly for the US Postal Service
- Grover Mitchell (1930–2003), American jazz trombonist
- Grover Lewis (1934–1995), American journalist, pioneer of New Journalism
- Grover Dale (born 1935), American actor
- Grover Washington, Jr. (1943–1999), American jazz saxophonist
- Grover Jackson (born 1949), American luthier
- Grover Gardner (born 1956), American narrator of audio books

== Fictional characters ==
- Grover, Sesame Street character
- Grover Underwood (Percy Jackson), from the 2000s American book series Percy Jackson and the Olympians
