= 1633 in France =

- Decades: 1610s; 1620s; 1630s; 1640s; 1650s
- See also: History of France; Timeline of French history; List of years in France

Events from the year 1633 in France.

== Incumbents ==
- Monarch: Louis XIII

== Events ==
- January 12 – Congregation of the Mission founded by Vincent de Paul is constituted as a congregation by the pope in the bull Salvatoris nostri.
- January 15 – Edict creating the Parliament of Metz, which supersedes the courts of justice of the Three Bishoprics.
- January 17–19 – Quarrel between Diogo de Oliviera, alias Sindicario, a member of the Portuguese marrano community of Rouen, and Diego de Cisneros, a Spanish priest of the Roman Catholic Diocese of León in Spain, over a request for a catholicity certificate. The case is brought before the courts and causes the dispersion of part of the Rouen marrano community, some finding refuge in Lille, Antwerp and London. The Spanish priests Cisneros and Juan Bautista de Villadiego, denounced as spies, as well as Oliviera, are arrested. The 36 marranos accused of crypto-Judaism are finally absolved on June 30 after an investigation by the King's Council and the promise to pay 250000 livres to the crown.
- February 25 – Arrest of Charles de L'Aubespine, Keeper of the Seals of France; he is imprisoned at Angoulême. On the same day his friend François de Rochechouart, chevalier de Jars, is imprisoned in the Bastille.
- February 28 – Pierre Séguier becomes Keeper of the Seals of France (until 1650).
- March 1 – Samuel de Champlain reclaims his role as commander of New France, on behalf of Cardinal Richelieu.
- April 19 – The Treaty of Bärwalde is renewed between France and Sweden at the congress of Heilbronn. On April 23 an alliance is concluded between Sweden and the Upper Rhenish Circle, the Lower Rhenish-Westphalian Circle, the Swabian Circle and the Franconian Circle against Ferdinand II, Holy Roman Emperor.
- June 24 – The Compagnie normande (compagnie Rozée) obtains a 1-year monopoly of trade with Cape Verde, Senegal, The Gambia and (from 14 January 1634) Guinea.
- June 25 – Beginning of Vincent de Paul’s regular Tuesday ecclesiastical conferences.
- August 22 – First of the published weekly conferences on subjects of interest arranged by Théophraste Renaudot in Paris.
- September 6 – Treaty of La Neuveville between Cardinal Nicholas Francis, Duke of Lorraine, and Richelieu, completed on September 20 by the Treaty of Charmes (in the Vosges) signed by Charles IV, Duke of Lorraine and ratified by the king.
- September 25 – Entry of the king into Nancy marking the occupation of the Duchy of Lorraine by France.
- November 18 – A sumptuary law prohibits all subjects from wearing gold or silver embroidery.
- November 23 – Decision of the Conseil du Roi (confirmed by the Parlement of Paris on 5 July 1634), to construct a new section of the city walls of Paris.
- November 29 – Systematic training of the Daughters of Charity of Saint Vincent de Paul in nursing by their co-founder Louise de Marillac begins.

== Births ==
- February 1 – Charles Drelincourt, physician (d. 1697)
- February 23 – Charles Patin, physician (d. 1693)
- c. May 1 – Sébastien Le Prestre de Vauban, noble and military engineer (d. 1707)
- May 21 – Joseph Chabanceau de La Barre, composer (d. 1678)
- June 16 – Jean de Thévenot, traveler and scientist (d. 1667)
- November 20 – Étienne de Carheil, Jesuit priest, missionary to the Iroquois and Huron Indians (d. 1726)
- December 27 – Jean de Lamberville, missionary (d. 1714)
- December 29 – Jean Le Pelletier, polygraph and alchemist (d. 1711)
- Full date missing
  - Marquise-Thérèse de Gorla, actress and ballet dancer (d. 1668)
  - Gabrielle de Rochechouart de Mortemart, Marchioness of Thianges, wit (d. 1693)
  - Jean-Nicolas Geoffroy, harpsichordist and organist (d. 1694)

== Deaths ==
- June – Étienne Brûlé, explorer (b. c. 1592)
- October 24 – Jean Titelouze, organist (b. c. 1562)
- Full date missing – Catherine Henriette de Balzac d'Entragues, Marquise de Verneuil, maîtresse-en-titre to Henry IV of France (b. 1579)
