= 1637 in France =

- Decades: 1610s; 1620s; 1630s; 1640s; 1650s
- See also: History of France; Timeline of French history; List of years in France

Events from the year 1637 in France.

== Incumbents ==
- Monarch – Louis XIII

== Events ==
- 8 February – Louis XIII and his brother Gaston d’Orléans publicly reconcile their relationship, aided by Charles de Condren.
- 8–9 February – Battle of Savigny.
- 15–16 February – Siege of Arbent.
- 9 April – Charles IV and Béatrix de Cusance marry, just nine days after the death of her first husband. On 23 August the couple have their first child, Francis de Lorraine, who dies in infancy.
- 22 April – The Croquants' revolt begins in Périgord, resulting in the deaths of two sergeants.
- 13 May – Cardinal Richelieu invents the table knife by ordering his staff to round the edges off all his knives.
- 1 June – Royal troops, commanded by the Duke of Valette suppresses the Croquant revolt, resulting in over 1,000 deaths.
- Anne of Austria is investigated and found guilty of secretly corresponding with her brother, Philip IV, despite France and Spain being at war.
- Building commences on the Theatres of the Palais-Royal.
- Building commences on the Malouinière de la Verderie.

== Births ==
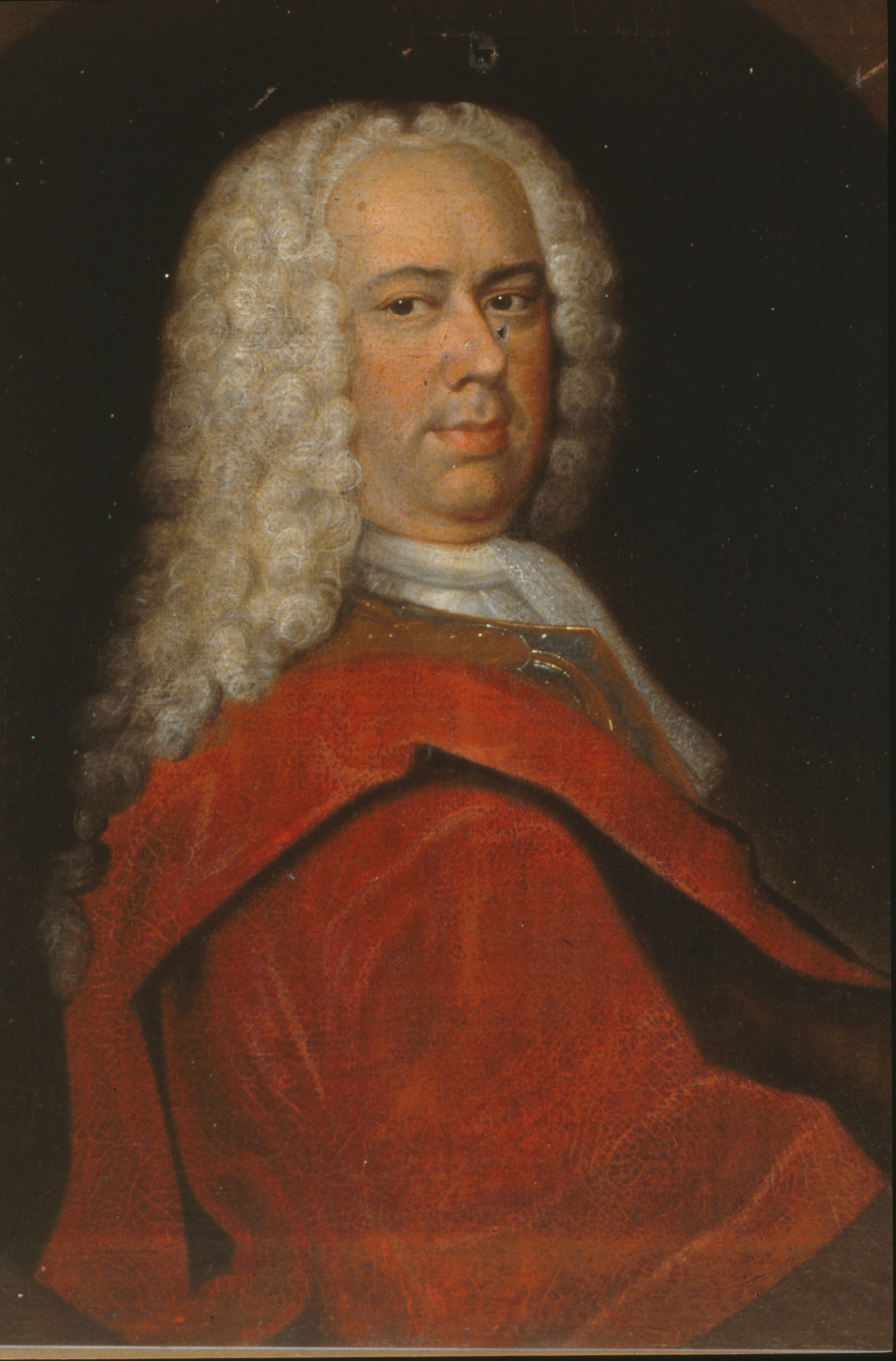
Johan Vibe

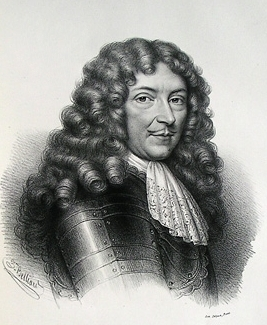
Nicolas Catinat

- 16 April – Johan Vibe, military officer and engineer, Governor-general of Norway (died 1710)
- 25 November – Armand de Gramont, military officer and courtier (died 1673)
- Nicolas Catinat, Marshal of France (died 1712)
- César Auguste de Choiseul, military officer (died 1705)
- François Leguat, explorer and naturalist (died 1735)
- Jacques Marquette, Jesuit missionary (died 1675)

== Deaths ==
- Philippe Habert, poet (born 1604)
- Augustin de Beaulieu, general (born 1589)
- Guillaume Courtet, Dominican priest, martyr (born 1589)
- Charles d'Ambleville, composer
- Henri de Bailly, composer

== New books published ==
- René Descartes (1596–1650), Discourse on the Method.
