= Charles Oliver Fairbank =

Charles Oliver Fairbank may refer to:

- Charles Oliver Fairbank (politician) (1904–1982), Ontario petroleum engineer and political figure
- Charles Oliver Fairbank (doctor) (1858–1925), his father, Canadian oilman, military officer and M.D

== See also ==
- Charles Fairbanks (disambiguation)
