= 1634 in France =

- Decades: 1610s; 1620s; 1630s; 1640s; 1650s
- See also: History of France; Timeline of French history; List of years in France

Events from the year 1634 in France.

== Incumbents ==
- Monarch: Louis XIII

== Events ==
=== January–June ===
- January
  - Franche-Comté reverts to direct rule from Spain following the previous month's death of Isabella Clara Eugenia: a political change that has been argued to mark the beginning the Ten Years' War within the Thirty Years' War.
  - Edict on the nobility.
- January 19 – Charles IV, Duke of Lorraine abdicates in favour of his brother Nicholas Francis at Mirecourt; on February 1 he crosses the Rhine at Breisach and retires to Besançon.
- February 18 – Nicholas Francis of Lorraine marries his cousin Claude Françoise at Lunéville against the advice of the king of France; on returning to Nancy, the ducal family is arrested by French troops and held in custody.

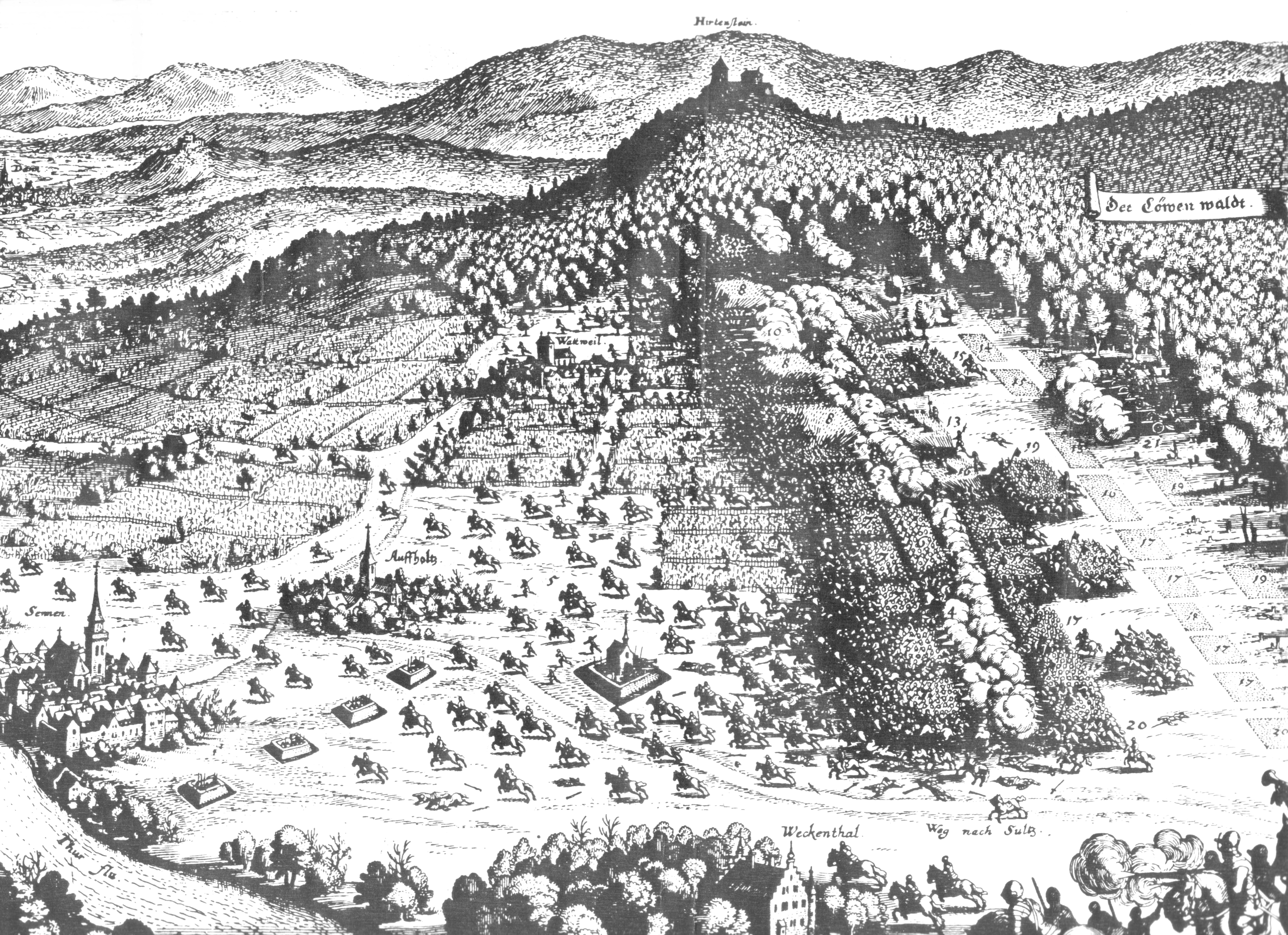
Battle of Wattwiller depicted by Matthäus Merian

- March 2 – Battle of Wattwiller: Forces of the Swedish Empire are victorious over those of the Holy Roman Empire and Duchy of Lorraine on the plain of Cernay in Alsace.
- March 6 – Henriette and Marguerite of Lorraine manage to flee Nancy for Franche-Comté.
- March 26 – Giorgio Bolognetti is appointed Apostolic Nuncio to France.
- April 1 – Nicholas Francis of Lorraine and his wife flee to Franche-Comté; of their family only Nicole, Duchess of Lorraine, who is ill, remains in Nancy. She is transferred to Paris where she arrives on May 7. Richelieu charges the count of Brassac to administer Lorraine.
- April 16 – Sumptuary laws proscribe embroidery of gold or silver.

=== July–December ===
- July 26 – Siege of La Mothe-en-Bassigny in Lorraine by Armand Nompar de Caumont ends after 141 days when it capitulates to him.
- July 4 – The trading post of Trois-Rivières is founded in New France (the modern-day Canadian province of Quebec).
- August (prob.) – Jean Nicolet becomes the first European to set foot in Wisconsin. He is in search of a water-route to the Pacific, when he lands at Green Bay (Lake Michigan).
- August 12 – Ferry de Haraucourt de Chambley is nominated as bailiff of Nancy.
- August 18 – Loudun possessions: Father Urbain Grandier is burned at the stake in Loudun having been accused of demonic possession and of having introduced it to the convent of Ursulines here.
- September 5 – The Parlement of Paris declares the second marriage of Gaston, Duke of Orléans, with Marguerite of Lorraine, to be invalid; it condemns Charles IV, Duke of Lorraine for felony and kidnapping of Gaston and reunites the Duchy of Bar with the kingdom.
- September 11
  - After the Battle of Nördlingen, Richelieu advises the king to continue to support the anti-Habsburg cause.
  - Beginning of the Grands Jours de Poitiers, extraordinary justice sessions instigated by the king.
- September 16–17 – Edict and declaration of the king at Monceaux ordering establishment of a sovereign council at Nancy (continues to 13 July 1637).
- October 8 – Gaston, Duke of Orléans, leaves Brussels and returns to Paris. On October 21 at Saint-Germain-en-Laye, he swears before the king "to love the cardinal as much as he had hated him".
- October 9 – Treaty between the king and the Swedish Empire over Alsace; French garrisons replace the Swedish here.
- October 13 – Foundation of the hospice des Incurables, the future Laennec hospital of Paris.
- November 17 – Cardinal Mazarin, named apostolic nuncio extraordinary on August 19, arrives in Paris to negotiate restitution of the estates of the Duke of Lorraine and to reconcile France and the Habsburgs, taking up his duties on November 26.

=== Undated ===
- François Leclerc du Tremblay (Père Joseph) becomes a member of the Conseil du Roi as Ministre d’État.
- The Académie française is founded by Cardinal Richelieu.
- First Théâtre du Marais opens in Paris.
- Temple du Marais completed in Paris.
- Robert Giffard de Moncel spearheads Perche migration to New France.
- Trading post of La Baye is founded in New France.
- Doubling of the taille (land tax) to finance the Thirty Years' War.

== Births ==
- February 14 – Pierre Martin de La Martinière, physician, surgeon and explorer
- March 18 (bapt.) – Madame de La Fayette, novelist (died 1693)
- April 6 – Pierre Thomas, scholar and memoirist (died 1698)
- July 14 – Pasquier Quesnel, Jansenist theologian (died 1719)

== Deaths ==
- June 26 – Nikolaus Ager, botanist (born 1568)
- August 18 – Urbain Grandier, priest, executed (born 1590)
- October 19 – Agnes of Jesus, nun (born 1602)
- Approximate date – Marin le Bourgeoys, artist, gunsmith, inventor and luthier (born c. 1550)
