= 1638 in France =

- Decades: 1610s; 1620s; 1630s; 1640s; 1650s
- See also: History of France; Timeline of French history; List of years in France

Events from the year 1638 in France.

== Incumbents ==
- Monarch: Louis XIII

== Events ==
- March 3 – Battle of Rheinfelden: A mercenary army under Bernard of Saxe-Weimar, fighting for France, defeats Imperial forces.
- March 5 – Thirty Years' War: The Treaty of Hamburg is signed between France and Sweden by Cardinal Richelieu of France and representatives of Queen Christina of Sweden.
- December 18 – Cardinal Mazarin becomes premier adviser to Cardinal Richelieu on the death of François Leclerc du Tremblay (Père Joseph).

== Births ==
- January 1 – Antoinette du Ligier de la Garde Deshoulières, poet (d. 1694)
- May 11 – Guy-Crescent Fagon, physician and botanist (d. 1718)
- June 8 – Pierre Magnol, botanist (d. 1715)
- July 11 – Olympia Mancini, courtier (d. 1708)
- August 6 – Nicolas Malebranche, philosopher (d. 1715)
- September 5 – Louis XIV, son of the incumbent king (d. 1715)

== Deaths ==
- February 26 – Claude Gaspard Bachet de Méziriac, mathematician (b. 1581)
- April 13 – Henri, Duke of Rohan, Huguenot leader (b. 1579)
- December 17 – François Leclerc du Tremblay, friar and political adviser (b. 1577)
