= Grover Washabaugh =

American football and basketball coach

- Washabaugh, South Hills H.S. coach, 1937

Biographical details
- Born: September 21, 1892; Mount Pleasant, Pennsylvania, U.S.
- Died: March 16, 1973 (aged 80); New Wilmington, Pennsylvania, U.S.

Coaching career (HC unless noted)

Football
- 1924–1927: South Hills HS (PA)
- 1928–1936: South Side HS (PA)
- 1937–1942: Westminster (PA)

Basketball
- c. 1920: Woodlawn HS (PA)
- 1928–1937: South Side HS (PA)
- 1937–1956: Westminster (PA)

Head coaching record
- Overall: 16–26–6 (college football); 296–129 (college basketball)

Accomplishments and honors

Championships
- Basketball; Pennsylvania State High School (1933)

Grover Cleveland "Pappy" Washabaugh (September 21, 1892 – March 16, 1973) was an American football and basketball coach. He served as the head football coach at Westminster College from 1937 to 1942, during which time he compiled a 16–26–6 record, and the head basketball coach from 1937 to 1956, during which time he compiled a 296–129 record.

== Biography ==
Washabaugh's first coaching experience came at Woodlawn High School in Aliquippa, Pennsylvania, where he mentored the basketball team and taught physical education. He then coached at South Hills High School for four years before moving on to South Side High School in Pittsburgh. From 1927 to 1936, he served as South High's head football and basketball coach. In 1937, he took over as the head basketball and football coach at Westminster College. Washabaugh also served as the school's athletic director. In August 1943, Westminster College discontinued its football team. It was later revived after World War II for the 1946 season. Washabaugh continued to serve as the basketball coach until 1956 and posted a 296–129 record.

In January 1959, he returned home to Pittsburgh after suffering a mild stroke. Washabaugh retired in 1961. He was inducted into the Helms Foundation Hall of Fame and the National Association of Intercollegiate Athletics Hall of Fame. Washabaugh died on March 16, 1973, at Jameson Memorial Hospital in New Castle, Pennsylvania, at the age of 80. He was survived by his wife Grace, with whom he had a son and two daughters.
