= Manifest, Louisiana =

Unincorporated community in Louisiana, U.S.

Coordinates: 31°42′37″N 91°57′43″W

Manifest is an unincorporated area in Catahoula Parish, Louisiana. It is home to Alexander Cemetery where local judge, newspaper publisher, and political leader James G. Taliaferro is buried along with his wife. Manifest is home to a fire station. State Representative Representative Grover C. Womack (born August 27, 1909) was from Manifest.

Heard Cemetery and Alexander Cemetery are among the four small cemeteries in the area. Alexander Cemetery includes many members of the Taliaferro family as well as an addition for African Americans.
