= 1635 in France =

- Decades: 1610s; 1620s; 1630s; 1640s; 1650s
- See also: History of France; Timeline of French history; List of years in France

Events from the year 1635 in France.

== Incumbents ==
- Monarch: Louis XIII

== Events ==
- February 22 – The Académie française in Paris is formally constituted as the national academy for the preservation of the French language.
- May – France declares war on Spain.
- May 28; combined French and Swedish forces under Marshal de la Force defeat the Duke of Lorraine (battle of Belfort)
- May 30 – Thirty Years' War – The Peace of Prague is signed, which ends the German civil war aspect of the conflict.
- Guadeloupe and Martinique are colonized by France.
- Dominica is claimed by France.

== Births ==
- June 3 – Philippe Quinault, French writer (d. 1688)
- July 19 – Francine Descartes (d. 1640)
- July 23 – Adam Dollard des Ormeaux (d. 1660)
- October 7 – Roger de Piles, French painter (d. 1709)
- November 27 – Françoise d'Aubigné, Marquise de Maintenon, second wife of Louis XIV (d. 1719)

== Deaths ==
- December 25 – Samuel de Champlain, French explorer and founder of Quebec (b. c.1567)
