= Charles Fairbanks (disambiguation) =

Charles W. Fairbanks (1852–1918) was an American politician and vice-president.

Charles Fairbanks may also refer to:

- Charles H. Fairbanks (1913–1984), American archaeologist/anthropologist
- Charles B. Fairbanks (1827–1859), American writer
- Charles Rufus Fairbanks (1790–1841), Canadian lawyer, judge, entrepreneur and political figure
- Chuck Fairbanks (1933–2013), American football coach

== See also ==
- Charles Fairbank (disambiguation)
