= 1632 in France =

- Decades: 1610s; 1620s; 1630s; 1640s; 1650s
- See also: History of France; Timeline of French history; List of years in France

Events from the year 1632 in France.

== Incumbents ==
- Monarch: Louis XIII

== Events ==
- 29 March – The Treaty of Saint-Germain is signed, returning Quebec to French control after the English had seized it in 1629.
- 23 July – Three hundred colonists for New France depart Dieppe.
- 1 September – A rebellion against French king Louis XIII is crushed at the Battle of Castelnaudary. The leader of the rebellion, Gaston, Duke of Orléans, the brother of Louis XIII, surrenders.
- 9 September – Thirty Years' War – Besieged by Wallenstein at Nuremberg, Swedish king Gustavus Adolphus attempts to break the siege, but is defeated in the Battle of the Alte Veste.

== Births ==
- 1 January – Claude de Choiseul-Francières, a Marshal of France (d. 1711)
- 12 February – Charles Aubert de La Chesnaye, businessman active in Canada (d. 1702)
- 3 May – Catherine of St. Augustine, nun and nurse of New France (d. 1668)
- 10 June – Esprit Fléchier, writer and Bishop of Nîmes (d. 1710)
- 14 June – Jean Gallois, scholar and abbé (d. 1707)
- 13 August – François-Séraphin Régnier-Desmarais, ecclesiastic (d. 1713)
- 20 August – Louis Bourdaloue, Jesuit preacher (d. 1704)
- 12 September (bapt.) – Claude Lefèbvre, painter and engraver (d. 1675)
- 15 September – Comte de Grignan, aristocrat (d. 1714)

== Deaths ==
- 30 October – Henri II de Montmorency, French naval officer and Governor of Languedoc (b. 1595)
