= Charles B. Fairbanks =

American writer (1827–1859)

- Born: Charles Bullard Fairbanks; March 19, 1827; Boston, Massachusetts
- Died: December 3, 1859 (aged 32); Paris, France
- Resting place: Montmartre Cemetery

Charles Bullard Fairbanks (March 19, 1827 – December 3, 1859) was an American writer, who became well known for the book: My Unknown Chum "Aguecheek".

== Biography ==
Fairbanks was born on March 19, 1827, in Boston, Massachusetts. His parents were Otis and Nancy Fairbanks. He was the eldest of four siblings. After finishing school, he became a clerk at a booksellers and afterwards assistant librarian at the Boston Athenaeum. However, due to his health, he quit his job and did a tour of Europe for the benefit of his health.

Being raised in a Protestant household, Fairbanks became interested in the Oxford Movement and converted to Catholicism. Then, he joined the Seminary of St. Sulpice in 1856 as a candidate for the priesthood. However, due to his continuing failing health he had to abandon his studies. He became an author instead, writing under the penname Aguecheek for several religious newspapers’ essays and sketches, as well as his travels around the United States and Europe. Later, he gathered his work and published them in book form.

Due to his ailing health, Fairbanks traveled for the third time to Europe. There, he contracted "hemorrhage of the lungs," which affected him greatly and lead to his death on December 3, 1859, on Paris, France. He was buried at the Montmartre Cemetery.

== Bibliography ==
- Aguecheek (1859), also published under the title My Unknown Chum
- Memorials of the Blessed: a series of short Lives of the Saints (1860)
- The Spirit of Christianity, translation of François Nepveu's work, "L'esprit du Christianisme ou la Conformité du Chrétien avec Jésus-Christ"

== Legacy ==
In 1878, Henry Garrity borrowed an out-of-print copy of the book Aguecheek from a friend, which led to him acquiring a copy of his own. He also conducted an investigation to discover the author of the book, leading to him finding out about Fairbanks. However, he expressed his doubts about the authorship of the book being by Fairbanks himself. He published the book in 1912 under the title My Unknown Chum.
