= 1636 in France =

- Decades: 1610s; 1620s; 1630s; 1640s; 1650s
- See also: History of France; Timeline of French history; List of years in France

Events from the year 1636 in France.

== Incumbents ==
- Monarch – Louis XIII

== Events ==
- 20 March – Treaty of Wismar
- 5 August – Crossing of the Somme

== Births ==
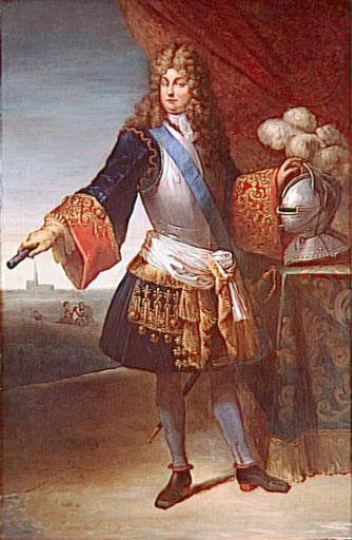
Noël Bouton de Chamilly

=== Full date missing ===
- Noël Bouton de Chamilly, Marshal of France (died 1715)
- Charles de La Fosse, painter (died 1716)

== Deaths ==
=== Full date missing ===
- Pierre Belain d'Esnambuc, trader and adventurer (born 1585)
- Paul Hay du Chastelet, magistrate, orator and writer (born 1592)
- Crespin Carlier, organ builder (born c.1560)
- Louise Bourgeois Boursier, midwife (born 1563)
- Jean Hotman, Marquis de Villers-St-Paul, diplomat (born 1552)
