= Samuel Peterson =

Swedish settler

- Born: c. 1639; Bogen, Värmland, Sweden
- Died: November 20, 1689 (aged 50); New Castle, Delaware
- Known for: Founder of Wilmington, Delaware

Samuel Peterson (c. 1639 – 20 November 1689) was an early settler of New Sweden and one of the founders of present-day Wilmington, Delaware.

== Life ==
Peterson was born in the province of Värmland, Sweden. He departed Sweden on the ship rn ("The Eagle") on February 2, 1654, and arrived in New Sweden on May 22, 1654. As he may have been only 15 years old, he was possibly part of the contingent of twelve boys on the ship from the Building College of Stockholm.

On April 16, 1675, Johan Anderson Stalcop conveyed half his land in Wilmington to Peterson and Lars Cornelison. Peterson erected a "humble cabin" on a hill overlooking Wilmington and cleared away the forest covering the southern declivity of the hill.

It was near Peterson's cabin where, as Peterson tilled the land with oxen, Quaker leader Elizabeth Shipley took in a view that she had earlier reported seeing in a dream, and determined that the Quakers were destined to settle the Delmarva Peninsula.

Peterson gave "30 feet" toward the construction of the Swedish Lutheran Church in Wilmington (now Holy Trinity Church (Old Swedes)).

In order to provide for his wife Brita, who outlived him, Peterson left his land "to that son who should live longest with his widow." Therefore, his son Peter took over the plantation and his son Matthias released all claim to the land by a deed dated December 4, 1702. Peter left the land to his son Peter Peterson (by will dated January 29, 1714), who on May 8, 1727, sold the part of the land lying along the Christina River to ..., who formally laid out the city of Wilmington in 1730.

== Notable descendants ==
- Charles Shreeve Peterson
