= Grover Hutchins =

American professor of pathology

Grover M. Hutchins (1933-2010) was an American professor of pathology at Johns Hopkins University School of Medicine in Baltimore, Maryland, for more than 30 years, including 22 years as director of autopsy services. He was a world-renowned expert in the fields of cardiac and pediatric pathology.

Hutchins was born and raised in Baltimore and graduated from Sparks High School. In 1949 he enrolled at Johns Hopkins University as an undergraduate in engineering, but interrupted his college education to serve in the Army Medical Corps. He then returned to Hopkins where he obtained a bachelor's degree in 1957 and an M.D. degree in 1961. He completed an internship and residency at Hopkins and was certified by the American Board of Pathology in Anatomic Pathology and Pediatric Pathology. He remained at Hopkins for his entire career, serving as a professor in the departments of both Pathology and Art as Applied to Medicine (Medical Illustration). He was still an active faculty member at the time of his death on April 27, 2010, at the age of 77, from an accidental fall while on a round-the-world cruise.

During his career he published more than 500 papers in peer-reviewed journals and served on the editorial boards of more than two dozen pathology journals. He helped to identify the cause of heart defects such as coarctation of the aorta. He created a computerized search and retrieval system for Hopkins' archive of 150 years' worth of autopsy materials, making it possible to utilize those materials for modern research.

== Recognition ==
In 2009 he was given a Lifetime Achievement Award by the College of American Pathologists.

Johns Hopkins University established the Grover M. Hutchins Memorial Fund to support research by residents and junior faculty members in the Department of Pathology.
