= Grover, Wisconsin =

Grover is the name of some places in the U.S. state of Wisconsin:

- Grover, Marinette County, Wisconsin, a town
- Grover, Taylor County, Wisconsin, a town
