= Daniel Georg Morhof =

German writer and scholar

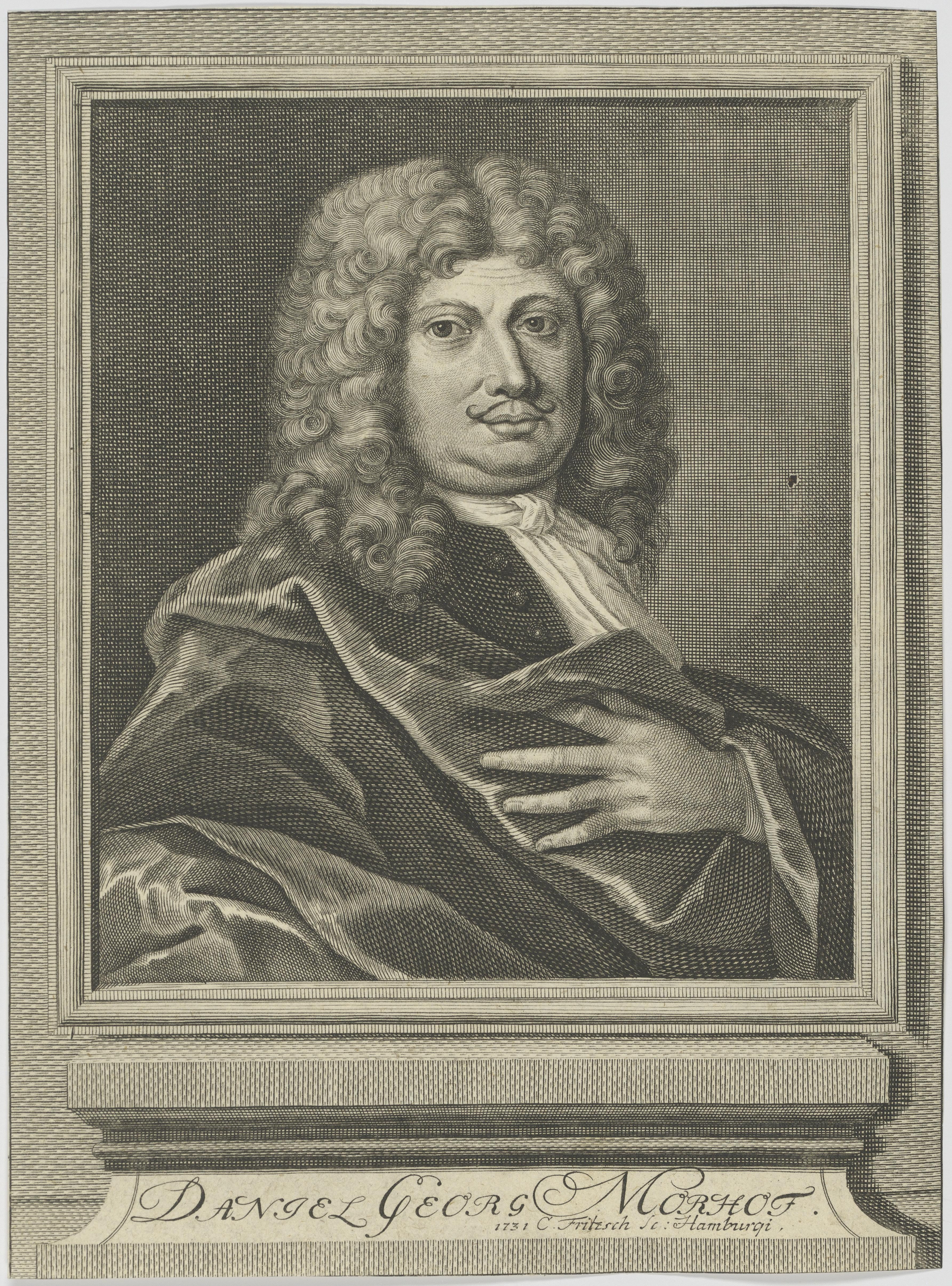
Daniel Georg Morhof.

Daniel Georg Morhof (6 February 1639 – 30 July 1691) was a German writer and scholar.

== Bibliography ==
Morhof was born at Wismar. He first studied jurisprudence and then literae humaniores at the University of Rostock, where his elegant Latin versification procured for him in 1660 the chair of poetry. In 1665 he moved to the University of Kiel as professor of eloquence and poetry; this chair he exchanged for that of history in 1673. He died at Lübeck.

Of his numerous writings, the most important are Unterricht von der deutschen Sprache und Poesie (1682), the first attempt in Germany at a systematic survey of European literature, and Polyhistor, sive de auctorum notitia et rerum commentarii (Lübeck, 1688, not completed till 1707; 4th ed., 1747), a kind of encyclopaedia of the knowledge and learning of his time.
