= Henri de Bailly =

French composer

Henri de Bailly (died October 1637) was a French composer. Originally a singer in the chapelle royale of Henri IV, he was elevated to Surintendant de la musique in 1622 by Louis XIII, and at the same time raised to the nobility.

Bailly was known for diminutions on airs by Guédron, Boësset and Moulinié. His own surviving works consist of only three airs preserved in tablatures by Gabriel Bataille (printed by Ballard, 1614):

- Reyne je ne puis endurer, que mes feux soyent au mespris d'une folle.
- Quelque chose que l'Amour puisse, il me tient pour mere nourrice.
- Spanish air - Yo soy la locura, la que sola infundo
