= Grover C. Womack =

American politician (1885–1956)

Member of the Louisiana House of Representatives

Personal details
- Born: January 29, 1885 Manifest, Louisiana
- Died: May 25, 1956 (aged 71)

Grover Cleveland Womack (January 29, 1885 – May 25, 1956) was a bank president, state representative, plantation owner, and merchant in Louisiana. He was born in Manifest, Louisiana. He became president of the Catahoula bank at Jonesville and Harrisonburg.

Womack married Eunice Womack and had three sons: J. G. Womack, Milford Womack and George Womack. His four brothers were J. E. Womack, B. A. Womack, W. W. Womack and H. W. Womack all of Orange, Texas. He also had two sisters: Miss Lottie Womack of Manifest and Mrs. Cora Posey of Jena, Louisiana.

Womack is buried at the Heard Cemetery at Manifest.
