= Louis de Chastillon =

French painter

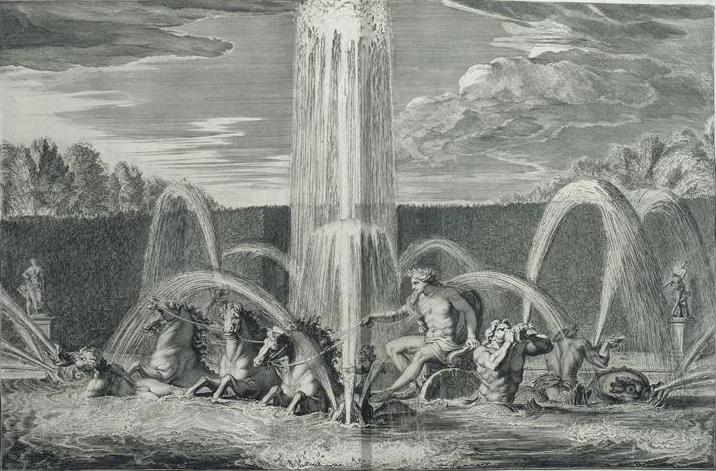
View of the Apollo Basin in the Gardens of Versailles, 1683.

Louis de Chastillon (c.1639–1734) was a French painter in enamel and miniature, and an engraver.

Chastillon was born at Ste. Ménehould in Champagne about 1639. He excelled in enamel painting, and executed all the portraits which the king gave, set in jewels, to the foreign ambassadors. He engraved several large plates after the designs of Jean Tortebat, and appears to have been an imitator of the fine style of Gérard Audran. His prints are not without merit, though greatly inferior to those of his model. He died at the Louvre in 1734. We have by him the following plates:

- The Adulteress before Christ; after S. Bourdon.
- The Conversion of St. Paul; after the same.
- The Seven Sacraments; after Poussin.
- St. John in the Isle of Patmos; after the same.
- Jupiter and Leda; after the same.
- The Fates spinning the Destiny of Marie de' Medici; after Rubens.
- Two sets of prints of the Fountains at Versailles.
- A set of plates of the Pavilions at Marly.
