= Pierre Martin de La Martinière =

17th-century French physician, surgeon and explorer

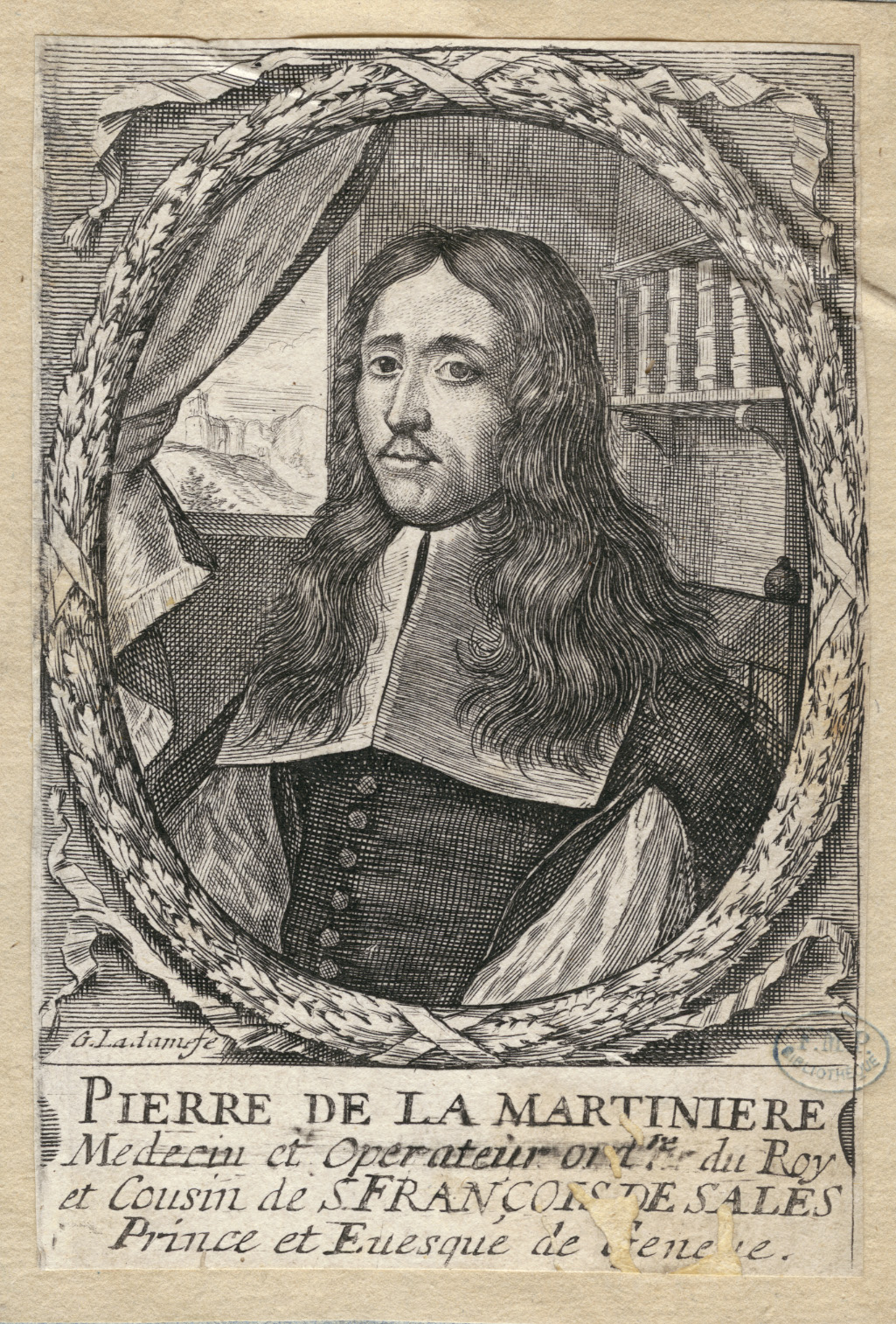

Pierre Martin de La Martinière (French pronunciation: [pjɛʁ maʁtɛ̃ də la maʁtinjɛʁ]; February 14, 1634 – c.1676 or c.1690) was a French physician, surgeon and explorer.

== Early life ==
La Martinière was born in Rouen. He was left fatherless at the age of nine. Not being on good terms with his mother, he left Lyon where he was residing at the time, then the Savoy and Geneva in order to find his maternal grandmother.

At the age of ten, he met Henri De Harcourt, an old friend of his father, who was commander of a regiment. The Count took pity on him (as he was an orphan) and so hired him as a surgeon's assistant in the battlefields. La Martinière thus participated in various campaigns of the Thirty Years' War. During that time he received both theoretical and practical medical instruction from his master.

== Captivity and further studies ==
Orphanhood was not the only vicissitude that visited La Martinière's childhood. At the age of twelve, he was taken captive by Barbary corsairs. He was eventually liberated by the Knights of Malta at the age of sixteen. Of the particulars of this experience he wrote a book which he published in 1674 under the title of L'Heureux esclave, ou Relation des aventures du sieur de La Martinière. Unlike his other travelogues, this book contains a number of elements of fantasy, in particular his reported encounter with a huge snake which he claims could have eaten a donkey and two lions, as well as a dubious description of African snakes, which among other monstrosities includes a three-headed snake.

La Martinière subsequently continued and perfected his medical education in Italy by working in the Ospedale degli Incurabili (Hospital for the Incurables) in Naples and the Hospital of St James for the Incurable in Rome.

== Later life and travel to the north ==
In 1664, La Martinière settled in Paris and became "chymical physician of the Royal Court", a title which gave him the right to practice in the capital city.

In 1670 (though, according to some accounts, as early as 1653; see below), La Martinière happened to be in Copenhagen when the Danish Northern Trading Company, having been granted franchise by Frederick III of Denmark, was to undertake an expedition to the northern realms with the objective of ascertaining the type of trade that could be maintained with the indigenous populations of the north. The king had for this reason equipped a fleet of three trading vessels belonging to the company. La Martinière, with the assistance of one of his friends, was enlisted as surgeon on board one of those ships and thus had the opportunity to wander through the coasts of Norway, Lapland, northern Russia, Novaya Zemlya, Greenland and Iceland for a period of five months. An account of the expedition was later published by him in 1671 in Paris. It is the first published travel report written by a Frenchman describing the Arctic coasts of Europe.

Although La Martinière's career is to some extent known, the same is not true as regards his private life. Concerning the latter, very little information is available. It seems that he married two times.

La Martinière died in or about 1676 according to some sources, at the age of 42. According to other sources, however, he died much later in 1690.

== Controversy over the date of La Martinière's journey to the north ==
No consensus exists concerning the date of La Martinière's journey to the north. While some sources place the expedition in the year of 1670, the date is also commonly given as 1653 instead of 1670. Väinö Tanner even writes that the travel took place in 1647. The date 1647 is undoubtedly fallacious, however, since it is clearly implied in the account of La Martinière's voyage that the travel did not occur prior to 1653 (see pp. 1–2 of the third edition of La Martinière's travel account). The following arguments have been set forth to prove the dates 1647 and 1653 erroneous and the date 1670 veracious:

- "In the introduction to the account, the years 1647 and 1653 are mentioned when referring to the years that the trading company received its royal franchises. This does not tell when the journey occurred. Commentators have, in other words, confused the date of La Martinière’s voyage with other dates mentioned in his book."
- "It is explicitly stated in the English edition that the journey lasted from April to September 1670. However, the date obviously has been added on by the English publisher."
- "We are reminded several times in the English edition that La Martinière undertook his journey in 1670."
- "In the French edition (1682:256), the author points to the winter of early 1670 when French doctors thought that the plague infected people because of extreme cold weather. So the book must have been written after 1670."
- "Also in the French edition (1682:134), La Martinière tells how he gave a book which he had written on medical science to a person whom he had met in Norway. This book, Le Prince des Operateurs, was published in France in 1668."
- "La Martinière was an experienced discoverer long before setting off on his northern trek. He had also written books about various diseases as a result of his long medical practice. It is improbable that a young man of 19 years, as he would have been in 1653, could have found enough time for this."

== List of works ==
- L'opérateur ingénu, enseignant les véritez et abus des opérateurs (c. 1665)
- Traitté des compositions du mitridat, du thériaque, de l'orviétan et des confections d'alkermès et d'hyacinthe et autres compositions antidotoires, partie de l'Empiric charitable (1665)
- Lettre envoyée à Mme Louyse de Vieupont,... par le sieur de La Martinière,... sur l'ombre de Phaéton, contre la lettre du Sr de Montpolly qu'il a escrite sur le sujet de la transfusion du sang et contre celle du Sr Lamy, réfutant l'erreur qu'il a de croire que toutes les maladies proviennent d'intempérie chaude (1667)
- L'Ombre d'Apollon, découvrant les abus de cette prétendue manière de guérir les maladies par la transfusion du sang. Ensemble une lettre servant de responce à la première et seconde lettre de M. Denis et Gadroys (1667)
- Médée résuscitée, affirmant l'utilité de la transfusion du sang. Ensemble la réponse à la lettre du sieur Denis sur la folie guérie et les bigarrures sur l'ombre de Jupiter (1668)
- Remonstrances charitables du sieur de La Martinière à M. Denis. Ensemble le récit de la mort d'un appellé Monroy et la sentence contradictoire donnée par M. le lieutenant criminel du 17 avril 1668, contre les transfuseurs (1668)
- Rencontres de Minerve, la Vertu, Honneur et Amour, faisans voir l'abus des circulateurs de sang sur le sujet de leur chymère (1668)
- Le nouveau voyage du nort, dans lequel on voit les moeurs, la manière de vivre, et les superstitions des Norweghiens, des Lapons, des Kiloppes, des Borandiens, des Syberiens, des Moscovites, des Samojèdes, des Zembliens et des Islandois (readable in Google Books)
- Voyage des pays septentrionaux: dans lequel se void les mœurs, maniere de vivre, & superstitions des Norweguiens, Lappons, Kiloppes, Borandiens, Syberiens, Samojedes, Zembliens, Islandois
  - First Edition (1671)
  - Third Edition (1682)
- L'Heureux esclave, ou Relation des aventures du sieur de La Martinière (1674)
