= Roy Henry Gover =

British painter and composer

Roy Henry Gover (1929–2003) was a British painter and composer that was born in London in 1929. He emigrated to the United States (San Francisco Bay Area) in 1959. His work was the subject of a major one-man retrospective at the San Francisco Museum of Modern Art (1971).

== Early career ==
Gover's original training was in commercial art. He graduated from the prestigious Willesden School of Art in North London, no longer extant. He worked in the advertising art trade in London and married (Jean), before the couple emigrated. In America they had two children (Kate and Jane). Gover continued to work in advertising art in the Bay Area but gradually found himself growing more compelled to pursue fine painting. The marriage ended and Gover struck out on his own as a painter, still doing random commercial work while trying to build a fine art career.

== Influences ==
Gover's painting, influenced by such European modernists as Klee, Kandinsky and Dalí, comprised a kind of intimate visual diary, incorporating symbolic representations of memories and current events in his life. By the 1960s and early 1970s his Bay Area reputation was at its height. He had exhibited in local museums and galleries and had multiple successful shows at the legendary Vorpal Gallery, enabling him to live on the earnings from his painting. By the mid-1970s he had grown disillusioned with the art market. Resisting promotion of his art, his reputation went into decline. He was ultimately forced to work in advertising art for the remainder of his life. Bay Area galleries still occasionally exhibit his painting.

== Later years ==
Since his death in 2003, age 74, his reputation has taken on a new life among young music fans for the extemporaneous songs he performed and recorded at his home over the years. Some of these songs reflect bitterly upon his life in the advertising world. They were made as cassette tapes, which Gover sent to friends and acquaintances. He also made a CD of the songs in 1999 (produced by Tractor Beam). Original copies of the cassettes and CD are now rare, but their circulation has led to the development of a number of Gover fan sites on the internet.
