= Janet Gover =

Australian novelist

- Born: 19?? Melbourne, Australia
- Citizenship: British
- Occupation: novelist
- Writing career
- Pen name: Janet Gover
- Language: English
- Period: 2002–present
- Genres: short stories, Rural Romance
- Notable awards: RNA Epic Romantic Novel of the Year, Elizabeth Goudge Trophy, Aspen Gold readers Choice Award
- Website: www.janetgover.com

Janet Gover (b. Melbourne, Australia) is an Australian writer of over a dozen romance novels and more than 20 short stories since 2002. Her work has won numerous awards in the UK and the US, including the Romantic Novelists' Association's Epic Romantic Novel of the Year (2017) and Elizabeth Goudge Trophy (2007).

She also writes as Juliet Bell, in collaboration with English author Alison May.

She worked as a television journalist in Australia and Hong Kong and the UK before moving to the UK. She was Publicity Officer for the Romantic Novelists' Association in 2010.

== Biography ==
Janet Gover was born in Melbourne, Australia, and grew up in a small country town in Queensland.

After studying journalism and politics at the University of Queensland, she became a television journalist, first in Brisbane and then Sydney before moving to Hong Kong and London. She was an on-the-road reporter, covering everything from natural disasters to visiting movie stars. She became a specialist crime and court reporter before changing her focus to politics. After several years as a reporter, she moved behind the camera to become a programme producer, and assignments editor.

Her first fiction was a short story, published in 2002. She is a well regarded creative writing tutor and frequently speaks to writing groups and conferences.

Married to an Englishman, she lives in London.

== Bibliography ==
=== Short stories ===
- The Last Dragon (2002)
- The Reunion Concert (2002)
- Where The Heart Is (2002) a.k.a. The Brown Pony
- Home of the Dragon (2002) a.k.a. The Last Dragon
- A Bush Christmas (2003)
- A Song in His Heart (2003)
- Pot Luck (2003) a.k.a. House Rules
- ´Tis The Season (2003)
- New Beginnings (2004)
- To Love and To Cherish (2004) a.k.a. Snapshot in Time
- My Hero (2007) a.k.a. The Romance Writer
- Do You believe in Fairy Tales (2007) a.k.a. Fairy Godmothers Need Not Apply
- Do You Believe In Fairies? (2008) a.k.a. Fairy Kiss
- Homeward Bound (2008)
- A Heavenly Child (2009)
- The Homecoming (2009)
- Waiting For a Wish (2009)
- Genesis II (2010)
- Sweet Memory (2013)
- A Piece of Cake (2014)
- The Cat Who Talked to Ghosts (2016)
- The Road West (2016)
- Second Chances (2016)

=== Novels ===
- The Farmer Needs a Wife (2009)
- The Bachelor and Spinster Ball (2009)
- Girl Racers (2010)
- Bring Me Sunshine (2013)

The Coorah Creek series:

- Flight To Coorah Creek (2014)
- The Wild One (2015)
- Christmas at Coorah Creek (2015)
- Little Girl Lost (2016)
- Wedding Bells by The Creek (2017)

The books were re-released starting in 2022, in a different sequence; Christmas at Coorah Creek preceding The Wild One.

- Marrying The Rebel Prince (2018)
- The Lawson Sisters (2020)
- Close To Home (2021)
- The Library at Wagtail Ridge (2022)
- The Lawson Legacy (2024)
- The Kitting Club at Wagtail Ridge (2025)

Writing as Juliet Bell:

- The Heights (2018)
- The Other Wife (2018)
