= South Side High School (Pittsburgh, Pennsylvania) =

- U.S. National Register of Historic Places
- Pittsburgh Landmark – PHLF
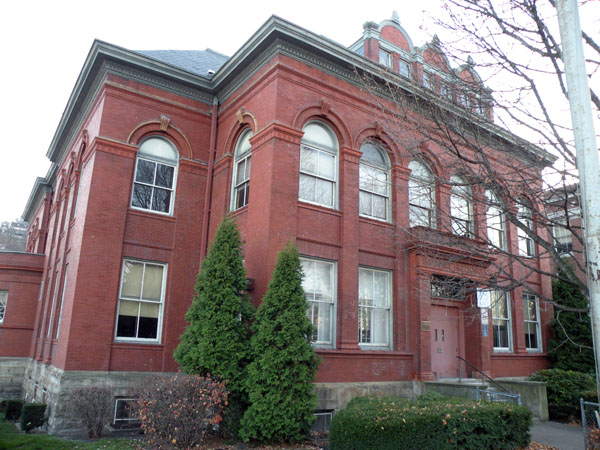

- Location within Pittsburgh Location within Pennsylvania Location within the United States
- Location: 900 E. Carson St., Pittsburgh, Pennsylvania
- Coordinates: 40°25′41″N 79°59′22″W
- Area: 4 acres (1.6 ha)
- Built: 1897
- Architect: Stotz, Edward; Siebert, John
- Architectural style: Classical Revival
- MPS: Pittsburgh Public Schools TR
- NRHP reference No.: 86002709

Significant dates
- Added to NRHP: September 30, 1986
- Designated PHLF: 1992

The South Side High School is a former high school located in the South Side Flats neighborhood of Pittsburgh, Pennsylvania. It was built in 1897. It was listed on the National Register of Historic Places in 1986.

In 1977, South High School won its only City Championship in Football, the first and only in any sport. The school was shut down on 14 August 2004; the building was sold as housing to Gregory Development in 2008 for $1.1 million.
