= Elanor Allerton =

English-born resident of the Colony of Virginia (1639–1674)

- Born: March 30, 1639; Whitby, England
- Died: May 11, 1674 (aged 35); Jamestown, Colony of Virginia, English America
- Occupations: Diarist; tavern assistant
- Known for: Documenting early Jamestown history and colonial politics
- Spouse: Adam Sutton (m. 1654)

Elanor Allerton (March 30, 1639 – May 11, 1674) was a resident of Jamestown, in what was then the Colony of Virginia. She became a victim of the Native American attacks around the original Jamestown settlement in the time leading up to Bacon's Rebellion. She became an important figure in history when her diary was discovered during the excavation of Jamestown.

== Early life ==
Elanor was born in Whitby, England out of wedlock to John Allerton and Margaret Smith in 1639. John Allerton fled Holland in 1635 due to an outbreak of the Bubonic Plague. When he reached England, he entered into a brief affair with Margaret Smith and began to restart his shipbuilding business. With the news of Margaret's pregnancy, her mother, who came from a well-to-do family of nobles, paid her father off to keep Elanor away from the public eye until her 10th birthday. Her father contracted Syphilis from a local prostitute and began working on his final ship, which was a vessel meant for colonization of the New World.

== Journey to Jamestown (1649-1652) ==
As John Allerton's mental conditions deteriorated, he became increasingly paranoid, which was reflected in the design and construction of his final ship. While negotiating payment with the ship's buyers, Allerton asked only that his daughter be a passenger on the ship and that the half the money he would have received be given to his daughter upon her arrival in the new world. With the influence of the Smiths' old money and their desire to keep Elanor a secret from the town, the ship buyers agreed to terms. As news of Algerian pirates incepting British vessels began to circulate, John Allerton built a Scooby-Doo-like passageway into the front hull of the ship, telling only his daughter of the alteration. When it was time for Elanor to set sail, her father was in the last few days of his life. The ship left port in London on April 3, 1650; John Allerton died within the week.

=== Altercation with Algerian Pirates ===
Not a full day before embarking out of the English harbor, the ship was overtaken by Barbary pirates and Elanor found herself in the nook her father created just for her. The pirates killed 5 colonists in the struggle and were on their way back to North America when a British Naval ship intercepted the pirates. Elanor was found and brought back to England, where she embarked once again on the journey to the New World.

== Arrival in the New World ==
On the second ship, Elanor was under the charge of Katherine St. Leger Culpeper, a friend of Margaret Smith's family. The Culpepers had a young daughter the same age as Elanor named Francis and they became fast friends. When the ship arrived in Jamestown Virginia, the two girls had great difficulty parting ways and wrote many letters to one another over the years.

== Life in Jamestown ==
Immediately after arriving in the New World, the Culpepers had Francis married to Captain Samuel Stephens, a prominent landowner and governor in the Albemarle Settlements. The Culpepers took care of Elanor, receiving a good amount of her grant, until she was 15 and old enough to be married off. Elanor married the tavern keeper, Adam Sutton, a twenty-eight-year-old who earned his post at the tavern by working for six years as an indentured servant. It was in her early years of Jamestown that Elanor began her work of journaling her life. She was particularly interested in the small village's history, with an interesting recounting of Jamestown's starving time that occurred during the winter of 1609-1610. When Elanor was 30, Francis Culpeper, now Mrs. William Berkley moved to Jamestown to take her position as the governor's wife. The two women became interested in the process of the 22 seat House of Burgesses. Elanor's accounts of the process are of the most accurate still existing today.

== Death ==
Francis and Elanor liked to collect Indian arrowheads in the surrounding forests some afternoons, but on May 11, 1674 as the women wandered a village over to Middle Plantation, they were ambushed by the local Indians enraged at a misunderstanding that occurred earlier in the day. Elanor was killed but Francis was rescued by a few men of Middle Plantation, the ground of what is now Williamsburg. Elanor's death was significant because it helped spark Bacon's Rebellion that occurred in 1676 because of colonist that felt unsafe from Indian attacks.

== See also ==
- Jamestown, Virginia
- Bacon's Rebellion
