= GROVER =

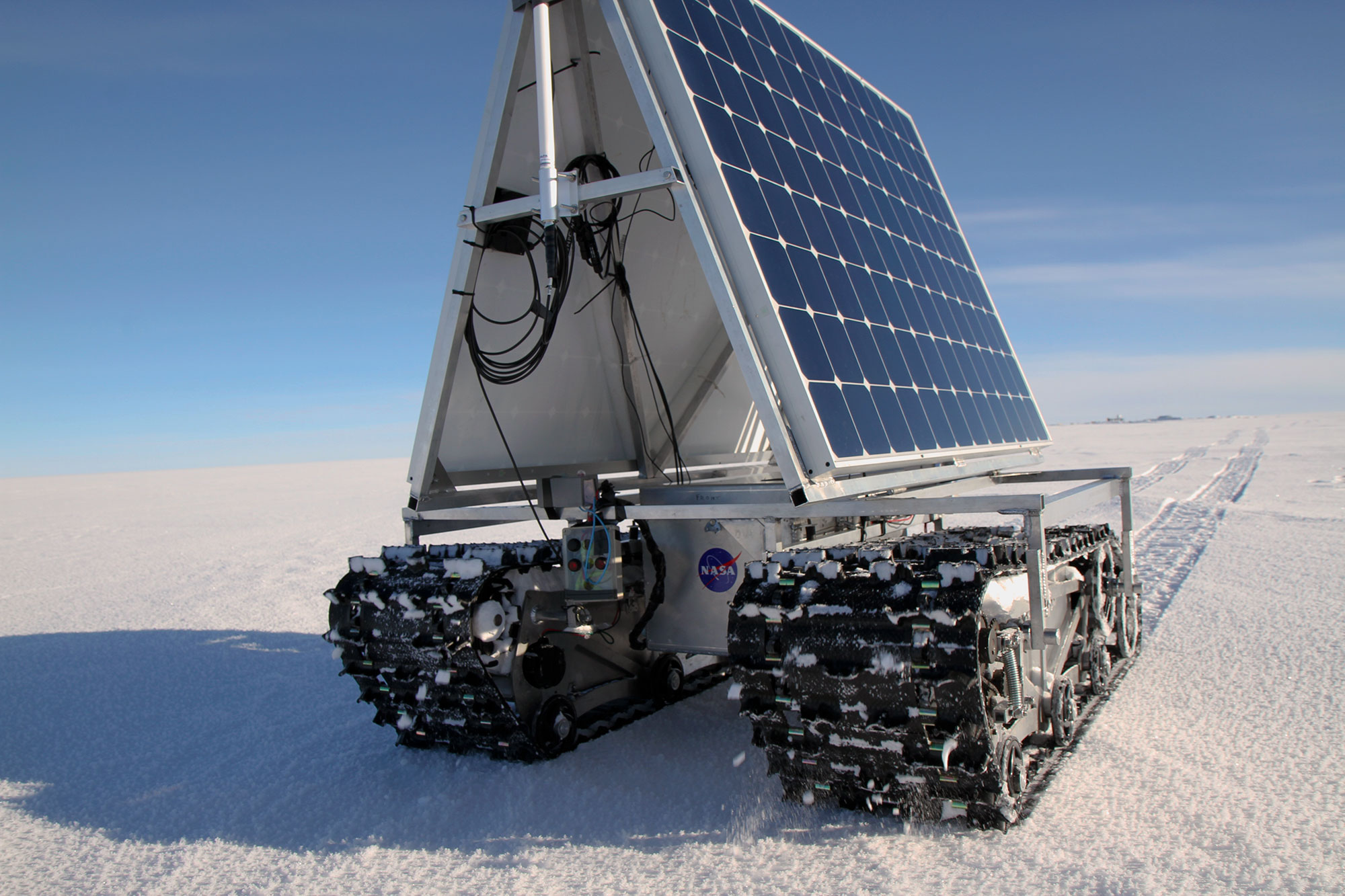
GROVER during a sustained test of the power consumption on June 2, 2013.

GROVER or Goddard Remotely Operated Vehicle for Exploration and Research is an Earth-bound autonomous student-designed rover developed by the Goddard Space Flight Center. With this solar-powered rover, scientists hoped to get cheaper data about the Greenland ice sheet that lies in a rapidly warming region. The test drive started in Summit Camp in Greenland on a three kilometer thick ice sheet, which is the highest spot on the largest island of the World. The science team was led by the glaciologist Lora Koenig from NASA's Goddard Space Flight Center in Greenbelt, Md. The test began on 3 May 2013 at temperatures as low as −30 °C (−22 °F) and continued until 8 June 2013.

== Scientific expectations and cost reduction ==
Glaciologists expected to get information about how snow accumulates layer by layer over time by using the rover's ground-penetrating radar. Using humans, airplanes or satellites costs more than using rovers. The rover was expected to at least match the performance achieved by humans. The rover was also intended to measure newly created layers that occurred in summer 2012, when higher-than-normal temperatures caused surface melting across 97 percent of the ice sheet.

An accompanying rover named Cool Robot, intended to tow a variety of instruments for glaciological measurements, was also planned for deployment in June 2013. The solar panels of GROVER are arranged in an A-frame configuration so that it can get energy both directly from the Sun, which does not set during the Arctic summer, and from reflected sunlight. The rover operated at a location where the ice sheet is 2 miles (3.2 km) thick. It used a preprogrammed route and required only minimal interactions from the operator. Radar penetration reached up to 20 metres (66 ft), providing information about snow accumulation over the previous 20 years.

== Technical data ==
Height (m)	6 feet (1.8 m)
Mass (kg)	360 kilograms (790 lb)
Average speed	2 kilometres per hour (1.2 mph)
Test distance	700 kilometres (430 miles)
Radar penetration	20 metres (66 ft)
