= Fortunatus Hueber =

West German Franciscan historian and theologian

Fortunatus Hueber (21 November 1639 in Neustadt an der Donau – 12 February 1706 in Munich) was a West German Franciscan historian and theologian.

== Life ==
He entered the Bavarian province of the Franciscan Reformati on 5 November 1654. He was general lector in theology; cathedral preacher in Freising from 1670 to 1676; then in 1677 Provincial of Bavaria.

In 1679, he was definitor-general and chronologist of the order in Germany, and in 1698 was proclaimed scriptor ordinis. He was also confessor to the convent of the Poor Clares at Munich, called St. Jacob on the Anger.

As commissary of the general of the order in 1675 and 1701, he visited the Bohemian province, and in 1695 the province of St. Salvator in Hungary. The Elector of Cologne appointed Hueber as his theologian.

== Works ==
He left over twenty works. The "Menologium Franciscanum" (Munich, 1698), lives of the beatified and saints of the Franciscan order, is arranged according to months and days. He also published a smaller work in German on the same subject, under the title "Stammenbuch ... und jährliches Gedächtniss aller Heiligen ... aus denen dreyen Ordens-Ständen ... S. Francisci" (Munich, 1693).

His "Dreyfache Chronickh von dem dreyfachen Orden ... S. Francisci, so weith er sich in Ober- und Nider-Deutschland erstrecket" (Munich, 1686) is a source for the history of the Franciscans in Germany.

Amongst his other works are:

- "Libellus Thesium de mirabilibus operibus Domini" (Munich, 1665);
- "Homo primus et secundus in mundum prolatus" (Munich, 1670);
- "Leben des hl. Petrus von Alcantara" (Munich, 1670);
- "Seraphische Schule des hl. P. von Alc." (Munich, 1670);
- "Ornithologia per discursus praedicabiles exhibita" (Munich, 1678), in fol.

Written in the same style, but not printed, were:

- his spiritual discourses, "Zoologia moralis", and "Ichthyologia moralis", each in two vols.;
- "Candor lucis aeternæ seu Vita S. Antonii de Padua" (Munich, 1670);
- "Sanctuarium Prælatorum ... pro visitationibus" (Munich, 1684).

"Quodlibetum Angelico-Historicum" (Augsburg, 1697), published in Latin and German, is a contribution dealing with the history of the cult of the angels.
