= Gover Le Buen =

Gover Jaspes Le Buen (29 January 1639 - 16 June 1712) was born in Maastricht, Netherlands he is known as a revolutionary fighter during the Franco-Dutch War of 1672-1678. He is rarely known because of his hidden identity during his undercover missions of 1673.

== Early history ==
Gover Jaspes Le Buen was born in Maastricht, Netherlands to Pierre-Janko Le Buen and Marie Croche. Pierre-Janko was born in Rotterdam and Marie was born somewhere between the Holy Roman Empire and Venice. Gover was taught at home by his mother but a spell of tuberculosis took her life somewhere in 1650c. Gover's father, Pierre-Janko then taught Gover French and German to further expand his knowledge abroad. At age 31, Gover was working for a bakery in Maastricht.

== The Franco-Dutch War ==
In 1672, war broke out between The Netherlands, Spain, The Holy Roman Empire and Brandenburg against France, England, The Archbishopric of Cologne and the Bishopric of Munster. Gover joined the Dutch Army and was assigned to defend Maastricht. In 1673, the French army laid siege to Maastricht. Gover was assigned to remain in the city when the French took over. Knowing their defeat, the Dutch Army retreated to north of Maastricht. The French took over and Gover stayed with others to spy on the French. Whilst hiding out, Gover's commanding officer was shot dead by a French soldier. Gover took lead of his group and managed to soften the French forces by taking over the castle the French had commanded. The Dutch came back and pushed the French out.

== Post war ==
After the war, Gover stayed at his home of Maastricht. He was still a part of the Dutch garrison and was relieved of his command but still remained within the ranks of the army. At a later time, Gover left the army and stayed home with his wife and children. His wife was then killed during a horse riding accident. Tragedy struck Gover again, when his father was killed in Amsterdam, by a boating accident. Staying at home, Gover began painting for his own needs to beat his darkening depression brought on by the war he fought. Gover began a brief period of baking, but became ill and became bed-ridden.

== Death ==
On 16 June 1712, Gover died of influenza at his home of Maastricht. His children either married out or never did wed. Gover is buried in his home city of Maastricht.
