= Revolt of the va-nu-pieds =

Unsuccessful popular uprising in Normandy, France

Date	August – December 1639
Location	Avranches, Normandy, France
Result	Uprising suppressed

Belligerents
France	Anti-Gabelle Rebels

Commanders and leaders
(Kingdom of France) Cardinal Richelieu (Kingdom of France) Colonel Jean de Gassion (Kingdom of France) Barnabé du Laurens de la Barre	Jean Quetil (Note: a.k.a. Jean Nu-Pied)

Units involved
8 regiments	"Army of Suffering"

Strength
4,000	3,000 – 4,000

Casualties and losses
28 killed, unknown number of wounded	~300 killed, unknown number of wounded and captured, 12 executed

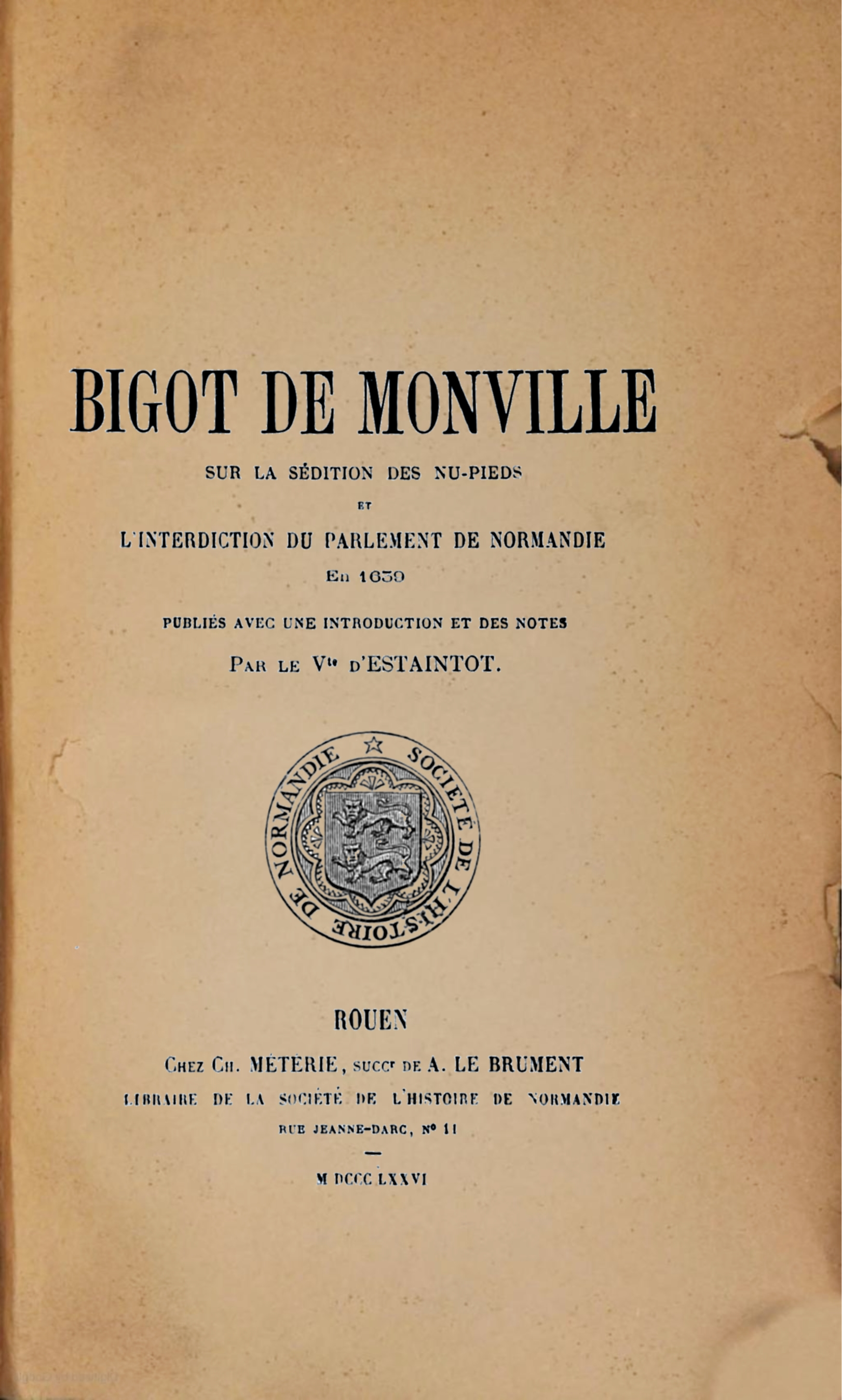
Mémoires sur la sédition des va-nu-pieds et l’interdiction du Parlement de Normandie by Bigot de Monville

The revolt of the va-nu-pieds (French pronunciation: [vanypje], barefooted ones) was an unsuccessful popular uprising in Normandy in 1639 following King Louis XIII's decision to set up the gabelle salt tax in Cotentin in place of the privilege of the quart-bouillon.

== Context ==
The Nu-Pieds revolt was the culmination of a series of troubles or “agitations” that shook Normandy for more than a decade. For some time, the royal budget had been in deficit (58 million livres in 1639 at a total expenditure of 172 million). To finance itself, the kingdom issued fiscal expedients. Normandy, one of the richest provinces of the kingdom, was obliged to make strong contributions. Each time, the fiscal pressure provoked problems, like in Rouen in 1623, when people protested against the obligation to pay charges for brouettiers, for chiffonniers etc. to the tax office; or in 1628 and 1634 in protest against a tax on leather markings.

== Course ==
On 16 July 1639, Charles Le Poupinel, in charge of collecting taxes, is assassinated by the people of Avranches. The troubles quickly spread throughout the region, as far as Caen, Rouen and Bayeux. The general of the insurgents, Jean Quetil, takes the name of Jean Nu-Pied.

The jacquerie brought together almost all social categories: peasants (labourers, salt workers, etc.), ploughmen, clerks, gentlemen, often impoverished, who were responsible for military exercise, but also the little robins who were jealous of the officers of gabelle who have succeeded.

Following their predecessors in the region, the Gautiers who supported the Catholic League, their revolt was very religious. They place themselves under the patronage of Saint John the Baptist. Very influential in the Norman revolt, the priests framed the rebels.

The idea is spreading that under the old law of the Charter to the Normans of 1315, it is the Normans who must set the tax. There is strong regional cohesion. The most cultured of the insurgents wrote manifestos praising the time of the dukes when Normandy was independent, but also the time of the good kings (Louis XII and Henry IV of France) when centralism, as well as taxes, were weak.

On the orders of Cardinal Richelieu who wanted to set an example, this sedition was fiercely repressed by Colonel Jean de Gassion who was placed under the orders of Chancellor Pierre Séguier. Barnabé du Laurens de la Barre, president in the Election of Mortain, took an active part in the repression of this uprising. The revolt was finally crushed on 30 November 1639 under the ramparts of Avranches where 300 dead were counted; those responsible were judged and the Norman towns lost their privileges. Punishment fell on Rouen where Chancellor Séguier established himself at the royal abbey of Saint-Ouen, in 1640, lodged his soldiers with locals, replaced the municipality with a commission and banned Parliament. When he marches on Caen, all of Normandy is terrified. Barnabé du Laurens de la Barre was ennobled in September 1654 by letters patent signed by King Louis XIV.

== Etymology ==
The term “va-nu-pied” appeared in 1639 in the work Histoire des Secretaires d’État (History of State Secretaries) by Antoine Fauvelet du Toc under the spelling “Va nuds pieds” and, from 1646, in the columns of the journal Mercure François under the name “Jean va Nuds-pieds” (“John walks Barefooted”). The expression is the origin of the noun “va-nu-pieds” which has an invariable form.

== Bibliography ==
- Pierre Carel, Une émeute à Caen sous Louis XIII et Richelieu (1639) : la révolte des Nu-Pieds en Basse-Normandie, Caen, E. Valin, 1886;
- Madeleine Foisil, La Révolte des nu-pieds et les révoltes normandes de 1639, Paris, PUF, 1970;
- Jean-Louis Ménard, La Révolte des nu-pieds en Normandie au XVIIe siècle, Paris, Dittmar, 2005;
- Boris Porchnev, Les Soulèvements populaires en France de 1623 à 1648, S.E.V.P.E.N., Paris, 1963; reprinted as Les soulèvements populaires en France au XVIIe siècle, Flammarion, Paris, 1972.
- (in French) Mémoires du président Bigot de Monville sur la sédition des nu-pieds et l’interdiction du parlement de Normandie en 1639, Rouen, Métérie, 1876
