= Pierre Séguier =

French statesman (1588–1672)

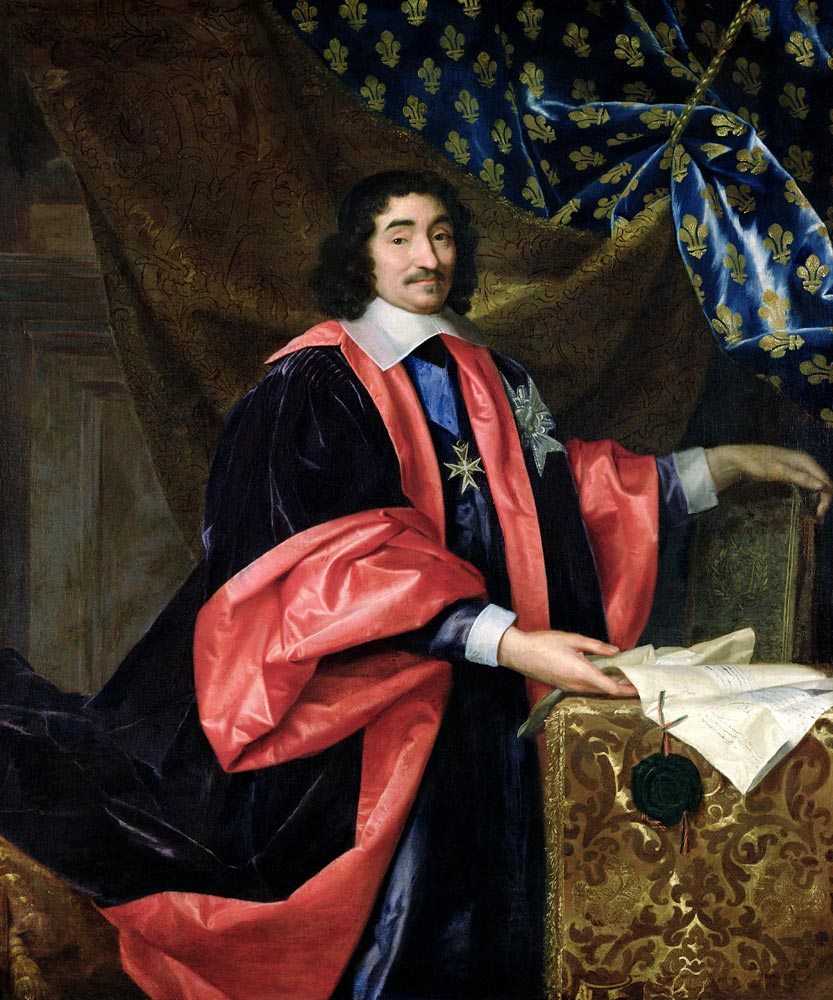
- Portrait by Henri Testelin, c. 1668

Chancellor of France
- In office 19 December 1635 – 28 January 1672
- Monarchs: Louis XIII; Louis XIV
- Preceded by: Étienne I d'Aligre
- Succeeded by: Étienne II d'Aligre

Personal details
- Born: 28 May 1588 Paris, France
- Died: 28 January 1672 (aged 83) Saint-Germain-en-Laye, France

Pierre Séguier (French: [pjɛʁ seɡje]; 28 May 1588 – 28 January 1672) was a French statesman who was the chancellor of France from 1635.

== Biography ==
=== Early years ===
Séguier was born in Paris to a prominent legal family originating in Quercy. His grandfather, Pierre Séguier (1504–1580), was président à mortier in the parliament of Paris from 1554 to 1576, and the chancellor's father, Jean Séguier, a seigneur d'Autry, was civil lieutenant of Paris at the time of his death in 1596.

Pierre was brought up by his uncle, Antoine Séguier, president and mortier in the parlement, and became master of requests in 1620. From 1621 to 1624 he was intendant of Guyenne, where he became closely allied with the duc d'Épernon. In 1624 he succeeded to his uncle's charge in the parlement, which he filled for nine years.

=== Career ===
In this capacity he showed great independence with regard to the royal authority; but when in 1633 he became keeper of the seals under Richelieu, he proceeded to bully and humiliate the parlement in his turn. He became allied with the cardinal's family by the marriage of his daughter Marie with Richelieu's nephew, Pierre César du Cambout, marquis de Coislin, and in December 1635 he became chancellor of France. In 1637 Séguier was sent to examine the papers of the queen, Anne of Austria, at Val-de-Grâce. According to Anquetil, the chancellor saved her by warning her of the projected inquisition.

In 1639 Seguier was sent to punish the Normans for the insurrection of the Nu-Pieds, the military chief of the expedition, Gassion, being placed under his orders. He put down pillage with a strong hand, and was sufficiently disinterested to refuse a gift of confiscated Norman lands. He was the submissive tool of Richelieu in the prosecutions of Cinq-Mars and François Auguste de Thou in 1642. His authority survived the changes following on the successive deaths of Richelieu and Louis XIII, and he was the faithful servant of Anne of Austria and of Mazarin. His resolute attitude towards the parlement of Paris made the chancellor one of the chief objects of the hatred of the Frondeurs.

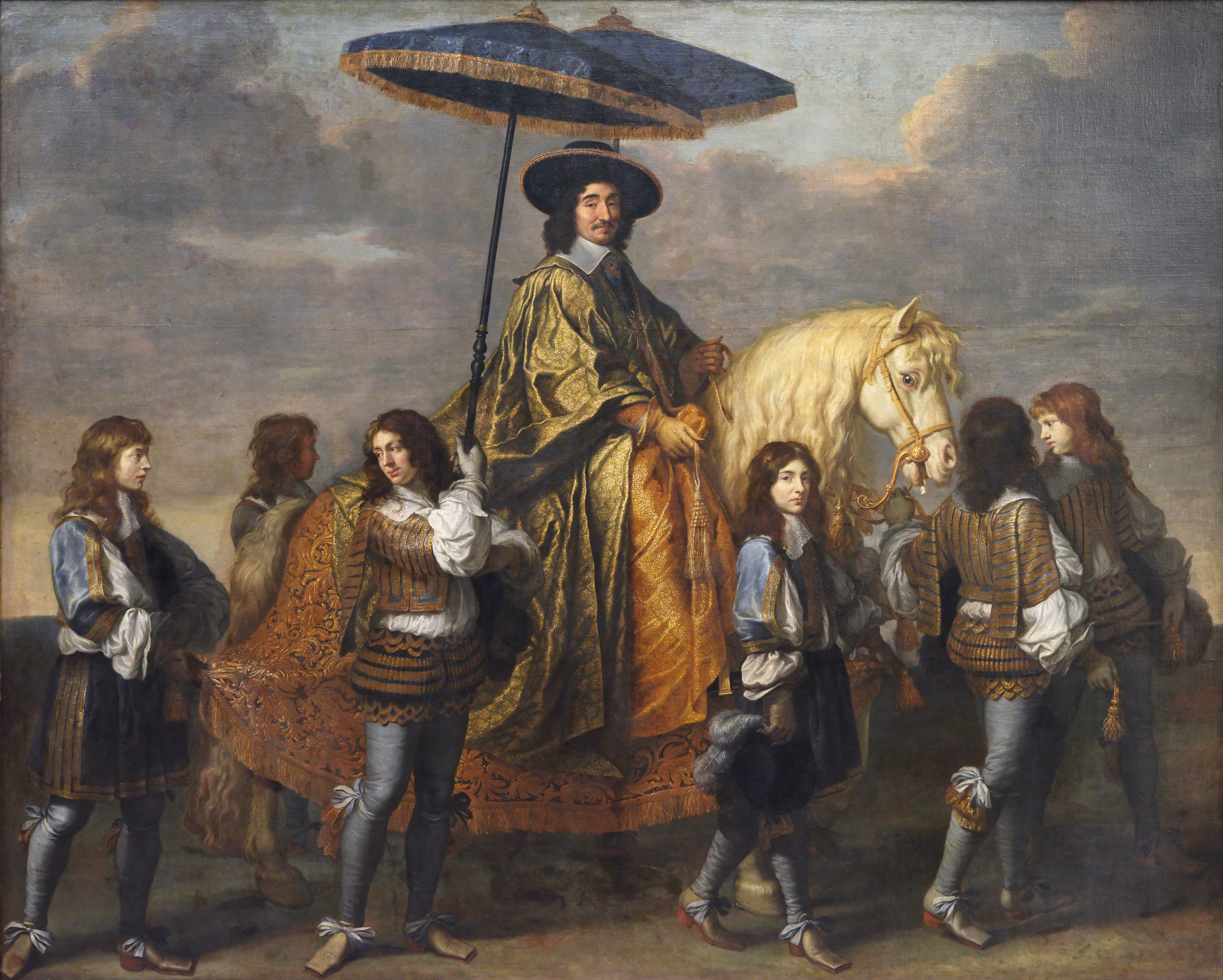
Pierre Séguier entering Paris with Louis XIV in 1660, painted by Charles Le Brun, c. 1670.

On 25 August 1648, Séguier was sent to the parlement to regulate its proceedings. On the way he was assailed by rioters on the Pont-Neuf, and sought refuge in the house of Louis Charles d'Albert, duc de Luynes. In the course of the concessions made to the Fronde in 1650, Séguier was dismissed from his office of keeper of the seals.

He spent part of his retirement at Rosny, with his second daughter Charlotte and her husband, the duke of Sully. He was recalled in April 1651, but six months later, on the king's attaining his majority, Séguier was again disgraced, and the seals were given to President Mathieu Molé, who held them with a short interval till his death in 1656, when they were returned to Séguier. Séguier lived for some time in extreme retirement in Paris, devoting himself to the affairs of the academy.

When Paris was occupied by the princes in 1652, he was for a short time a member of their council, but he joined the king at Pontoise in August, and became president of the royal council. After Mazarin's death in 1661 Séguier retained but a shadow of his former authority. He showed a great violence in his conduct of the case against Fouquet, voting for the death of the prisoner.

In 1666 Séguier was placed at the head of a commission called to simplify the police organization, especially that of Paris; and the consequent ordinances of 1667 and 1670 for the better administration of justice were drawn up by him.

Séguier died at Saint-Germain-en-Laye in 1672.

== Culture ==
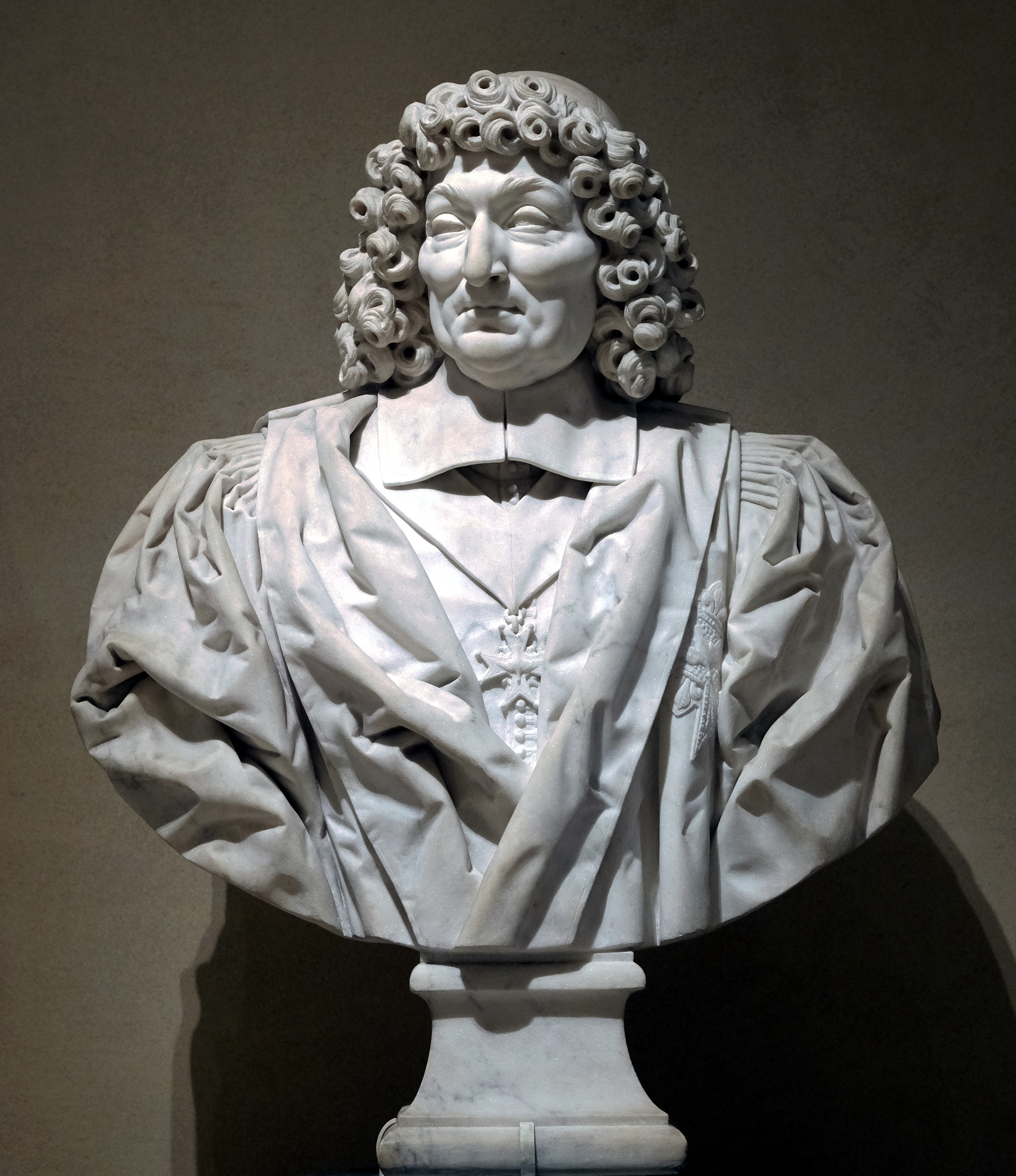
Pierre Séguier’s bust by Gérard-Léonard Hérard about 1671-1673 (musée du Louvre, MR2163).

Séguier was a man of great learning, and throughout his life a patron of literature. In December 1642 he succeeded Richelieu as official "protector" of the Académie française, which from that time until his death held its sessions in his house.

His library was one of the most valuable of his time, only second, perhaps, to the royal collection. It contained no less than 4000 manuscripts in various languages, the most important section of them being the Greek manuscripts. A catalogue was drawn up in Latin and in French (1685–1686) by the duc de Coislin. The chancellor's great-grandson, Henri Charles du Cambout de Coislin, bishop of Metz, commissioned Bernard de Montfaucon, a Benedictine of the Congregation of St Maur, to prepare a catalogue of the Greek manuscripts. with commentaries. This work was published in folio 1715, as Bibliotheca Coisliniana, olim Segueriana.... The greater part of the printed books were destroyed by fire, in the abbey of St Germain-des-Prés, in 1794.

Séguier is a minor character in The Three Musketeers.
