= François Nepveu =

François (Francis) Nepveu (29 April 1639—17 February 1708) was a writer on ascetical subjects.

== Biography ==
Nepveu entered the novitiate of the Society of Jesus on 12 October 1654, when but fifteen years old. Successively professor of Grammar, of Humanities and Rhetoric for six years, and of Philosophy for eight years, he was afterwards employed in the government. In 1689 he was made superior at Nantes; in 1684 rector at Vannes; in 1694 and 1700 rector at Orléans; in 1697 at Rouen; in 1704 Rennes where he was director of retreats until his death on 17 February 1708.

The Catholic Encyclopedia describes Nepveu as "a man of great zeal and intelligence."

== Works ==
Nepvue wrote voluminously on ascetical subjects, and some of his works have gone through many editions, having been translated into various languages.

- De l'amour de Notre Seigneur Jésus-Christ, et des Moyens de l'acquérir (Nantes, 1684), has gone through no less than fourteen editions in France. Selections from it were printed in the Petite Bibliothèque Chrétienne, issued by A. Vromont, Brussels, 1893. It has been translated into German, Italian (six editions), Spanish, Flemish, Polish, and English, edited by Henry J. Coleridge, and issued by Burns and Oates, 1869.
- Retraite selon l'esprit et la métho de de Saint Ignace (Paris, 1677; 514 pp.), also numbers fourteen editions of the original. Translations have been made into German, Spanish Flemish, Italian, and six editions in Latin.
- Méthode facile d'oraison, réduite pratique (Nantes) went through more than twelve editions in French and was several times issued in Spanish.
- Pensées et Réflections Chrétiennes pour tous le jours de l'année (4 vols., Paris, 1695), had eighteen French editions, the latest by Guyot, Paris, 1850, 640 pp., and went through some eleven editions in foreign languages.
- L'esprit du Christianisme ou la Conformité du Chrétien avec Jésus-Christ (Paris, 1700, 380 pp.), went through twenty-four editions, and three editions of extracts therefrom appeared in Belgium, also translated into foreign languages, ten editions coming out in Italian.
