= 1713 in France =

- Decades: 1690s; 1700s; 1710s; 1720s; 1730s
- See also: History of France; Timeline of French history; List of years in France

Events from the year 1713 in France.

== Incumbents ==
- Monarch – Louis XIV

== Events ==
- 11 April – The Second Treaty of Utrecht between Great Britain and France ends the War of the Spanish Succession; France cedes Newfoundland, Acadia, Hudson Bay and St Kitts to Great Britain.

== Arts and culture ==
- La Foire de Guibray, farce by Alain-René Lesage
- Arlequin Mahomet, farce by Alain-René Lesage
- Le Tombeau de Nostradamus, farce by Alain-René Lesage, first performed at the Foire de Saint Laurent in 1714.

== Births ==
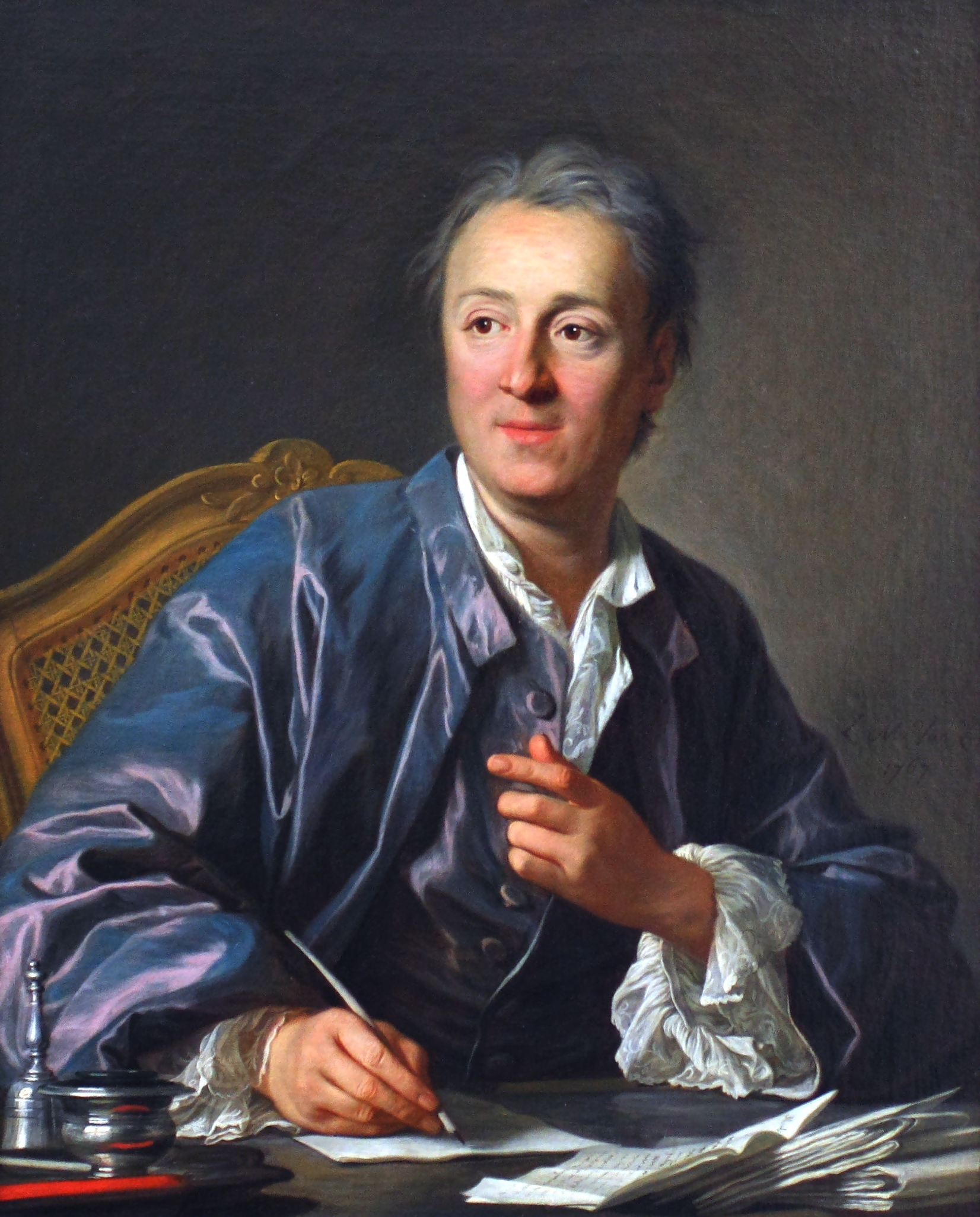
Denis Diderot.

- 2 January – Marie Dumesnil, actress (died 1803).
- 6 August – Marie Sophie de Courcillon, noblewoman (died 1756).
- 3 October – Antoine Dauvergne, composer and violinist (died 1797).
- 5 October – Denis Diderot, philosopher (died 1784)
- 28 December – Nicolas Louis de Lacaille, astronomer (died 1762).

== Deaths ==
- 11 January – Pierre Jurieu, Protestant leader (born 1637)
- 24 March – Toussaint de Forbin-Janson, Catholic Cardinal and Bishop of Beauvais (born 1631)
- 6 September – François-Séraphin Régnier-Desmarais, ecclesiastic, diplomat and poet (born 1632)
- 9 November – Armand Charles de La Porte de La Meilleraye, general (born 1632)
