= 1772 in France =

- Decades: 1750s; 1760s; 1770s; 1780s; 1790s
- See also: History of France; Timeline of French history; List of years in France

Events from the year 1772 in France.

== Incumbents ==
- Monarch: Louis XV

== Events ==
- 12 February – Breton-French explorer Yves-Joseph de Kerguelen-Trémarec discovers the uninhabited Kerguelen Islands in the Southern Ocean.
- The Clicquot Champagne house is founded by Philippe Clicquot in Reims.
- Houbigant Parfum is founded by Jean-François Houbigant of Grasse in Paris.

== Births ==
- 20 January – Angélique Brûlon, soldier, first female Knight of the Legion of Honour (d. 1859)
- 7 April – Charles Fourier, philosopher (d. 1837)
- 25 October – Géraud Duroc, general (d. 1813)

== Deaths ==
- 21 March – Jacques-Nicolas Bellin, cartographer (b. 1703)
- 26 March – Charles Pinot Duclos, writer (b. 1704)
- 15 June – Louis-Claude Daquin, composer (b. 1694)
- 22 June – François-Vincent Toussaint, writer most famous for Les Mœurs (b. 1715)
- 8 October – Jean-Joseph de Mondonville, violinist and composer (b. 1711)
