= 1707 in France =

- Decades: 1680s; 1690s; 1700s; 1710s; 1720s
- See also: History of France; Timeline of French history; List of years in France

Events from the year 1707 in France.

== Incumbents ==
- Monarch: Louis XIV

== Events ==
- 25 April: Battle of Almansa, described as "probably the only Battle in history in which the English forces were commanded by a Frenchman, the French by an Englishman".
- 2–3 May: Action of 2 May 1707
- 29 July - 21 August: Battle of Toulon: Prince Eugene is forced to abandon his attempt to take the naval port of Toulon
- 21 October: Battle at The Lizard

== Births ==
- 8 January - Louis, Dauphin of France, son of Louis, Duke of Burgundy (died 1712)
- 10 April - Michel Corrette, organist and composer (died 1795)
- Nicolas La Grange, playwright and translator (died 1775)

== Deaths ==
- 26 February - Louis Cousin, translator, historian, lawyer, royal censor and president of the cour des monnaies (born 1627)
- 24 April - Bernard Desjean, Baron de Pointis, admiral and privateer (born 1645)
- 5 November - Denis Dodart, physician, naturalist and botanist (born 1634)
- Julie d'Aubigny, swordswoman and opera singer (born c.1670)

== See also ==
- War of the Spanish Succession
