= 1700 in France =

- Decades: 1680s; 1690s; 1700s; 1710s; 1720s
- See also: History of France; Timeline of French history; List of years in France

Events from the year 1700 in France.

== Incumbents ==
- Monarch – Louis XIV

== Events ==
- 24 March – The Treaty of London is signed between France, England and the Dutch Republic.
- 15 November – Louis XIV of France accepts the Spanish crown on behalf of his grandson Philip of Anjou of the House of Bourbon, who becomes Philip V of Spain (in accordance with the will of Charles II of Spain), thus triggering the War of the Spanish Succession (1701–1714).

== Births ==
- 6 September – Claude-Nicolas Le Cat, surgeon (died 1768)
- 21 October – Princess Élisabeth Charlotte of Lorraine (died 1711)
- 19 November – Jean-Antoine Nollet, clergyman and physicist (died 1770)

=== Full date unknown ===
- Francesco Bartolomeo Rastrelli, architect (died 1771)

== Deaths ==
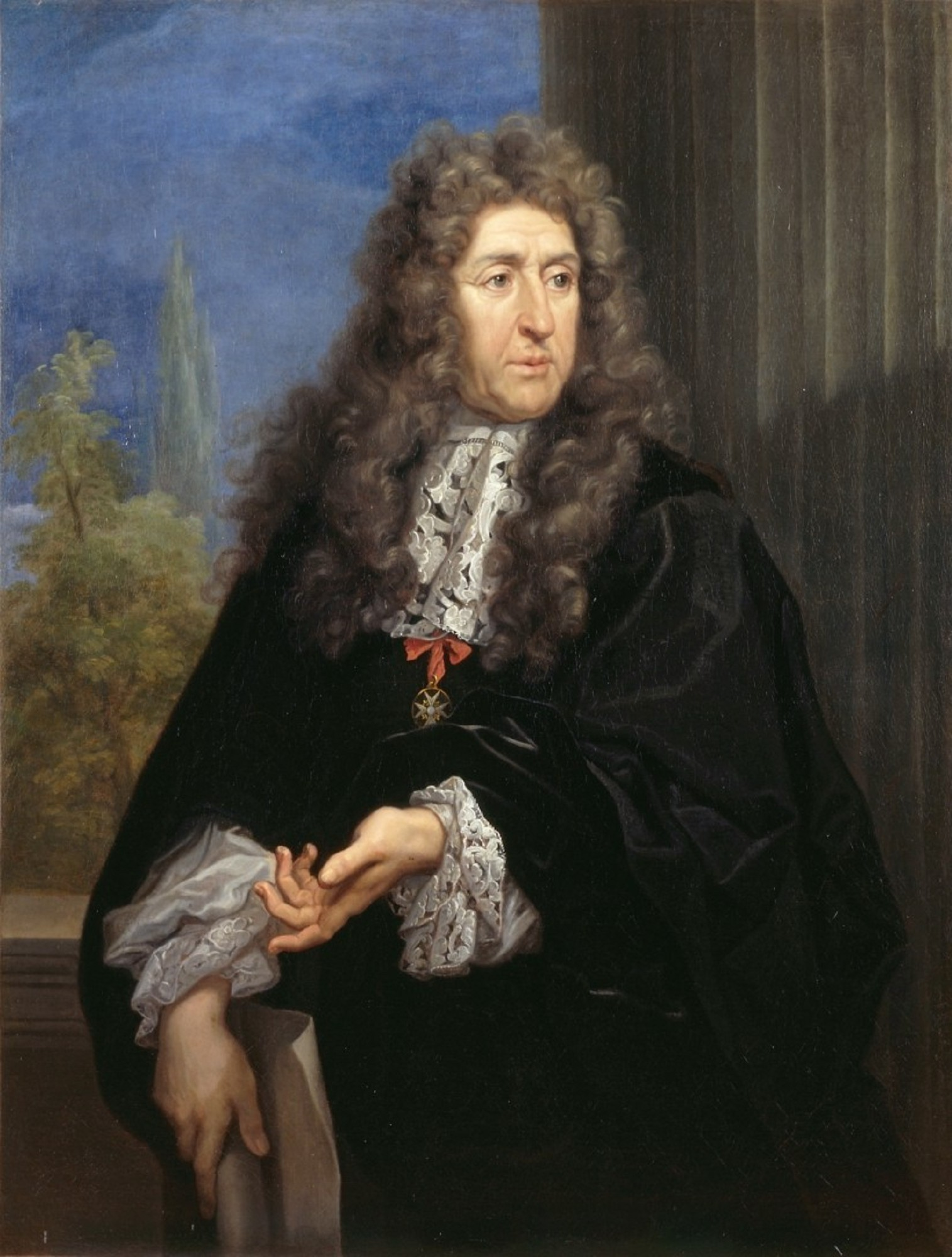
André Le Nôtre

- 6 January – Charles-Félix de Galéan, aristocrat and Lieutenant-General (born 1620)
- 9 August – Jean-Baptiste Tuby, Italian-born sculptor (born 1635)
- 15 September – André Le Nôtre landscape architect (born 1613)
- 23 October – Anne Marie de Bourbon, princess (born 1675)
- 13 November – Louis Guittar, pirate, hanged in London
- 30 November – Armande Béjart, actress (born 1640)

=== Full date unknown ===
- Monsieur de Sainte-Colombe, composer and violinist (born c.1640)
- Jean Castaing, engineer, inventor of the castaing machine
