= 1710 in France =

- Decades: 1690s; 1700s; 1710s; 1720s; 1730s
- See also: History of France; Timeline of French history; List of years in France

Events from the year 1710 in France.

== Incumbents ==
- Monarch: Louis XIV

== Events ==
- August 20 – War of the Spanish Succession: Battle of Saragossa: The Spanish-Bourbon army commanded by the Marquis de Bay is soundly defeated by the forces of the Habsburg monarchy under Guido Starhemberg and their allies.

== Births ==
- February 15 – Louis Duke of Anjou, great-grandson of reigning King Louis XIV and his eventual successor (as Louis XV) (d. 1774)
- November 13 – Charles Simon Favart, French dramatist (d. 1792)

=== Full date unknown ===
- Antoine Yart, poet and translator (d. 1791)

== Deaths ==
- February 16 – Esprit Fléchier, French writer and Bishop of Nîmes (b. 1632)
- February 25 – Daniel Greysolon, Sieur du Lhut, French explorer (b. c. 1639)
- March 4 – Louis III, Prince of Condé (b. 1668)
- June 7 – Louise de La Vallière, mistress of King Louis XIV of France (b. 1644)
