= 1709 in France =

- Decades: 1680s; 1690s; 1700s; 1710s; 1720s
- See also: History of France; Timeline of French history; List of years in France

Events from the year 1709 in France.

== Incumbents ==
- Monarch – Louis XIV

== Events ==
- 1 January – Battle of St. John's: French capture St. John's, capital of the British colony of Newfoundland.
- 6 January – Western Europe's Great Frost of 1709, the coldest period in 500 years, begins during the night, lasting three months, with its effects felt for the entire year. In France, the Atlantic coast and Seine River freeze, crops fail, and 24,000 Parisians die. Floating ice enters the North Sea.
- 13 April – The Raudot Ordinance of 1709 becomes law in the French colony of New France, legalizing slavery.
- 11 September – Battle of Malplaquet (War of the Spanish Succession) fought near the French border: French strategic victory but tactical victory for the opposing alliance.

== Births ==
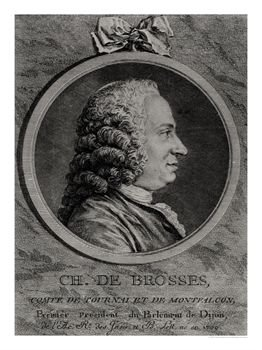
Charles de Brosses

- 7 February – Charles de Brosses, writer (died 1777)
- 24 February – Jacques de Vaucanson, engineer and inventor (died 1782)
- 14 April – Charles Collé, dramatist (died 1783)
- 7 August – Jean-Jacques Lefranc, Marquis de Pompignan, polymath (died 1784)
- 29 August – Jean-Baptiste-Louis Gresset, poet and dramatist (died 1777)
- 3 September – Joan Claudi Peiròt, Occitan writer (died 1795)
- 23 November – Julien Offray de La Mettrie, physician and philosopher (died 1751)

=== Full date unknown ===
- Jean Girardet, painter of portrait miniatures (died 1778)

== Deaths ==
- 20 January – François de la Chaise, confessor of Louis XIV (born 1624)
- 9 February – François Louis, Prince of Conti, general (born 1664)
- 5 April – Roger de Piles, painter, engraver, art critic and diplomat (born 1635)
- 17 July – Pascal Collasse, composer (baptized 1649)
- 4 September – Jean-François Regnard, comic poet (born 1655)
- 17 October – François Mauriceau, obstetrician (born 1637)
- 8 December – Thomas Corneille, dramatist (born 1625)
- 13 December – Louis de Verjus, politician and diplomat (born 1629)
- 31 December – Pierre Cally, philosopher (born 1630)

=== Full date unknown ===
- Jean-Baptiste Boyer d’Éguilles, engraver, painter and collector (born 1650)
- Louise de Prie, royal governess (born 1624)
- Thierry Ruinart, monk (born 1657)
