= Joseph Labrosse =

Joseph Labrosse may refer to:

- Louis-Joseph Labrosse, Ontario notary and political figure
- Joseph Labrosse (Carmelite), French Carmelite missionary and writer
