= 1704 in France =

- Decades: 1680s; 1690s; 1700s; 1710s; 1720s
- See also: History of France; Timeline of French history; List of years in France

Events from the year 1704 in France.

== Incumbents ==
- Monarch: Louis XIV

== Events ==
- 13 August – War of the Spanish Succession – Battle of Blenheim: Allied troops under John Churchill, the Earl of Marlborough and Prince Eugene of Savoy defeat the Franco-Bavarian army.

== Births ==
- 12 February – Charles Pinot Duclos, writer (died 1772)
- 28 February – Louis Godin, astronomer (died 1760)
- 3 August – Catherine-Nicole Lemaure, operatic soprano (died 1786)
- 24 June – Jean-Baptiste de Boyer, Marquis d'Argens, writer (died 1771)

== Deaths ==
- 2 February – Guillaume François Antoine, Marquis de l'Hôpital, mathematician (born 1661)
- 24 February – Marc-Antoine Charpentier, composer (born 1643)
- 12 April – Jacques-Bénigne Bossuet, bishop and writer (born 1627)
- 13 May – Louis Bourdaloue, Jesuit preacher (born 1632)
- 7 July – Pierre-Charles Le Sueur, fur trader and explorer (born c. 1657)
- 14 August – Roland Laporte, Protestant leader (born 1675)
