= 1697 in France =

- Decades: 1670s; 1680s; 1690s; 1700s; 1710s
- See also: History of France; Timeline of French history; List of years in France

Events from the year 1697 in France.

== Incumbents ==
- Monarch – Louis XIV

== Events ==
- January – Charles Perrault publishes Histoires ou contes du temps passé ("Mother Goose tales") in Paris, a collection of popular fairy tales, including Cinderella, Puss in Boots, Red Riding Hood, The Sleeping Beauty and Bluebeard
- 5 September – Nine Years' War: Battle of Hudson's Bay – French warship Pélican captures York Factory, a trading post of the English Hudson's Bay Company in modern-day Manitoba (Canada)
- 20 September – The Treaty of Ryswick is signed by France and the Grand Alliance to end both the Nine Years' War and King William's War. The conflict having been inconclusive, the treaty is proposed because the combatants have exhausted their national treasuries. Louis XIV recognises William III as King of England and Scotland, and both sides return territories they have taken in battle. In North America, the treaty returns Port Royal (Nova Scotia) to France. In practice, the treaty is little more than a truce; it does not resolve any of the fundamental colonial problems, and the peace lasts only five years
- The Roman Catholic Diocese of Blois established

== Births ==
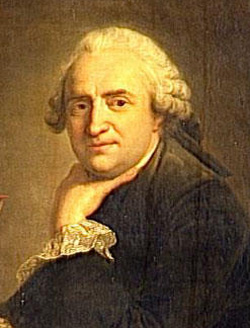
Jean Baptiste Bourguignon d'Anville

- 16 January – Jules, Prince of Soubise, nobleman (died 1724)
- 23 January – Joseph François Dupleix, governor general of the French establishment in India (died 1763)
- 10 May – Jean-Marie Leclair, violinist and composer (killed 1764)
- 11 July – Jean Baptiste Bourguignon d'Anville, geographer and cartographer (died 1782)

== Deaths ==
- 4 February – Adrien de Wignacourt, 63rd Grandmaster of the Knights Hospitaller (born 1618)
- 21 June – Joseph Anthelmi, ecclesiastical historian (born 1648)
- 5 August – Jean-Baptiste de Santeul, writer (born 1630)
- 1 October – Claudine Bouzonnet-Stella, engraver (born 1636)
- 22 November – Libéral Bruant, architect (born c.1635)
- 9 December – Scipion Abeille, surgeon and poet

=== Full date unknown ===
- François d'Orbay, draughtsman and architect (born 1634)
- Ange de Saint Joseph, missionary and linguist (born 1636)
