= 1770 in France =

- Decades: 1750s; 1760s; 1770s; 1780s; 1790s
- See also: History of France; Timeline of French history; List of years in France

Events from the year 1770 in France.

== Incumbents ==
- Monarch – Louis XV

== Events ==
- 16 May – 14-year-old Marie Antoinette of Austria marries Louis-Auguste (who in 1774 becomes King Louis XVI) at the Palace of Versailles
- 20 May – A stampede at a celebration of the newly wedded Marie Antoinette and Louis-Auguste in Paris kills more than a hundred people
- 3 June – The 7.5 M_{w} Port-au-Prince earthquake affects the French colony of Saint-Domingue with a maximum Mercalli intensity of X (Extreme), killing 250 or more
- 14 June–3 October – Charles Messier observes Lexell's Comet as it passes closer to Earth than any other in recorded history
- 7 December – Louis XV issues the Edict of December, dismissing rebellious magistrates of the Parlements of Paris and the other 13 provinces
- 24 December – César Gabriel de Choiseul is dismissed from his position as Secretary of the Navy by the king
- Cemetery of Saint-Louis, Versailles established
- Joseph-Louis Lagrange proves Bachet's conjecture
- The Baron d'Holbach's (anonymous) materialist work Le Système de la Nature ou Des Loix du Monde Physique et du Monde Moral is published

== Culture ==
- 20 January – The new Théâtre du Palais-Royal (rue Saint-Honoré), the first purpose-built opera house in Paris, designed by Pierre-Louis Moreau-Desproux, is inaugurated with a performance of Rameau's Zoroastre
- 16 May – The new Opéra royal de Versailles, designed by Ange-Jacques Gabriel, is inaugurated.
- 27 October – First performance of the opera Les deux avares, written by André Grétry, at Fontainebleau
- December – The Library of the Sorbonne in Paris is opened to the public
- The Théâtre Déjazet is established in Paris by the Comte d'Artois
- Anne Vallayer-Coster is admitted to the Académie royale de peinture et de sculpture at the age of 26

== Births ==
- 5 February – Alexandre Brongniart, chemist, mineralogist and zoologist (died 1847)
- 21 February – Georges Mouton, Marshal of France (died 1838)
- 2 March – Louis-Gabriel Suchet, Marshal of France (died 1826)
- 25 March – Antoine Richepanse, revolutionary general (died 1802)
- 10 May – Louis-Nicolas Davout, Marshal of France (died 1823)
- 18 December – Nicolas Joseph Maison, Marshal of France, Minister of War (died 1840)

== Deaths ==
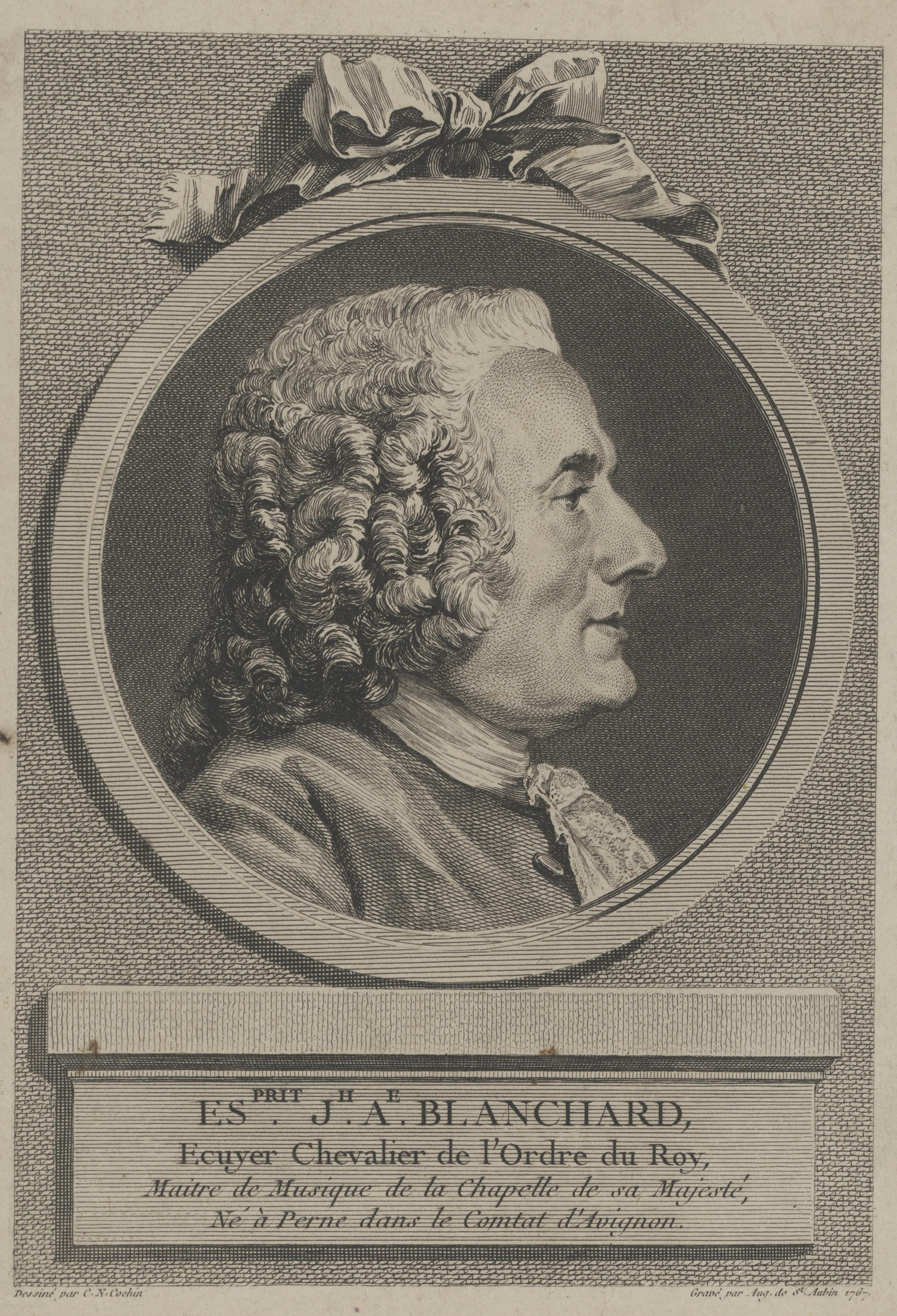
Esprit Antoine Blanchard

- 14 March – Nicolas-Charles-Joseph Trublet, clergyman and moralist (born 1697)
- 19 April – Esprit Antoine Blanchard, musician (born 1696)
- 25 April – Jean-Antoine Nollet, clergyman and physicist (born 1700)
- 30 May – François Boucher, painter (born 1703)
- 3 August – Guillaume-François Rouelle, chemist and apothecary (born 1703)
- 28 November – Charles-Jean-François Hénault, historian (born 1685)
- 15 December – Pierre-Joseph Alary, ecclesiastic and writer (born 1689)
