= 1706 in France =

- Decades: 1680s; 1690s; 1700s; 1710s; 1720s
- See also: History of France; Timeline of French history; List of years in France

Events from the year 1706 in France.

== Incumbents ==
- Monarch – Louis XIV

== Events ==
- 23 May – Battle of Ramillies
- 8 September – Battle of Castiglione

== Births ==
- 1 March – Sébastien Bigot de Morogues, soldier (died 1781)

== Deaths ==
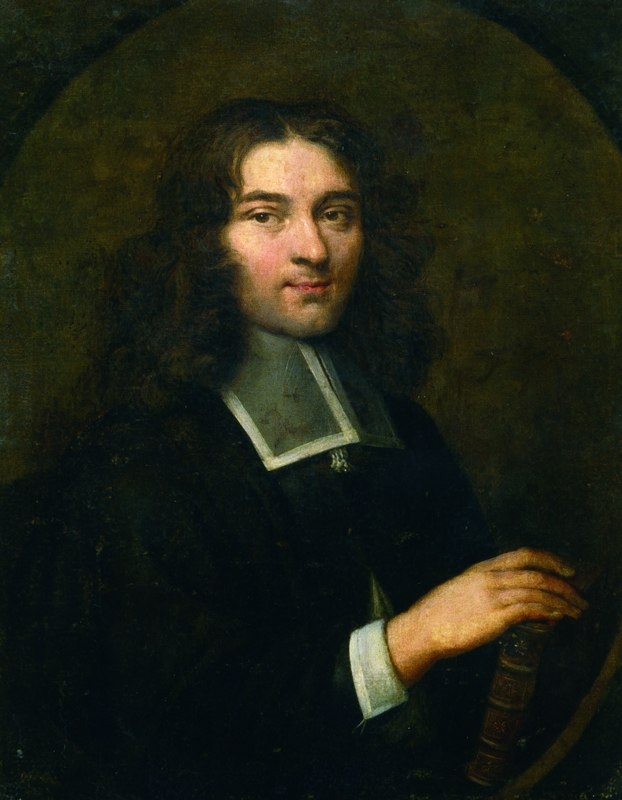
Pierre Bayle

- 21 January – Adrien Baillet, scholar and critic (born 1649)
- 30 June – Jacques Boyvin, composer (born c.1649)
- 3 July – Thomas Regnaudin, sculptor (baptized 1622)
- 9 September – Ferdinand de Marsin, general (born 1656)
- 28 December – Pierre Bayle, philosopher (born 1647)

=== Full date unknown ===
- Jacques Testu de Belval, poet and preacher (born c.1626)
- Jean Testu de Mauroy, clergyman and academic (born 1626)
