= 1699 in France =

- Decades: 1670s; 1680s; 1690s; 1700s; 1710s
- See also: History of France; Timeline of French history; List of years in France

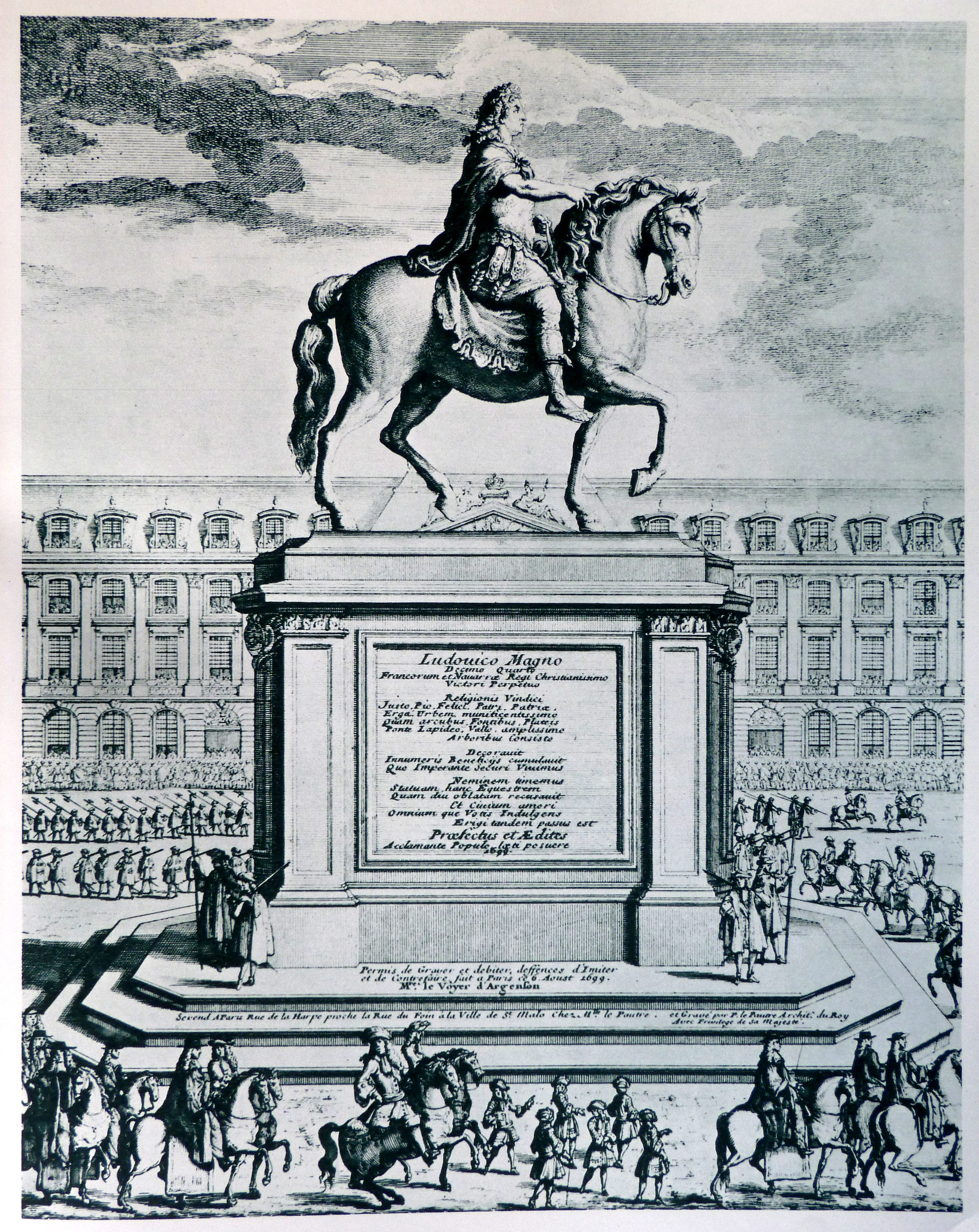
Inauguration of the equestrian statue of Louis XIV, August 13, 1699, in the Place Louis Le Grand (now Place Vendôme, statue destroyed in 1792)

Events from the year 1699 in France.

== Incumbents ==
- Monarch: Louis XIV

== Events ==
- 20 January: Louis XIV gave the French Academy of Sciences its first rules.
- 11 June: France, England and the Dutch Republic agree on the terms of the Treaty of London (1700) (Second Partition Treaty) for Spain.
- The Académie Royale de Peinture et de Sculpture holds the first of a series of salons at the Louvre Palace.

== Births ==
- 26 March: Hubert-François Gravelot, illustrator (d. 1773)
- 26 June: Marie Thérèse Rodet Geoffrin, salonnière (d. 1777)
- 17 August: Bernard de Jussieu, naturalist (d. 1777)
- 25 August: Charles Étienne Louis Camus, mathematician and mechanician (d. 1768)
- 13 October: Jeanne Quinault, actress and playwright (d. 1783)
- 2 November: Jean-Baptiste-Siméon Chardin, painter (d. 1779)
- 25 November: Pierre Subleyras, painter (d. 1749)

=== Full date unknown ===
- Joseph Galien, professor of philosophy and theology at the University of Avignon, meteorologist, physicist and writer on aeronautics (d. 1762 or 1782)

== Deaths ==
- 20 February: Jean-Baptiste Monnoyer, painter (b. 1636)
- 21 April: Jean Racine, classic dramatist (b. 1639)
- 26 September: Simon Arnauld, Marquis de Pomponne, diplomat and minister (b. 1618)
- 18 November: Pierre Pomet, pharmacist (b. 1658)
- 30 December: Pierre Robert, composer (b. c. 1618)

=== Full date unknown ===
- Antoine Le Grand, Cartesian philosopher, in England (b. 1629)
