= 1693 in France =

- Decades: 1670s; 1680s; 1690s; 1700s; 1710s
- See also: History of France; Timeline of French history; List of years in France

Events from the year 1693 in France.

== Incumbents ==
- Monarch – Louis XIV

== Events ==
- 27 June – Battle of Lagos
- 29 July – Battle of Landen
- 4 October – Battle of Marsaglia

== Births ==
- 10 November – Roland-Michel Barrin de La Galissonière, governor (died 1756)

== Deaths ==
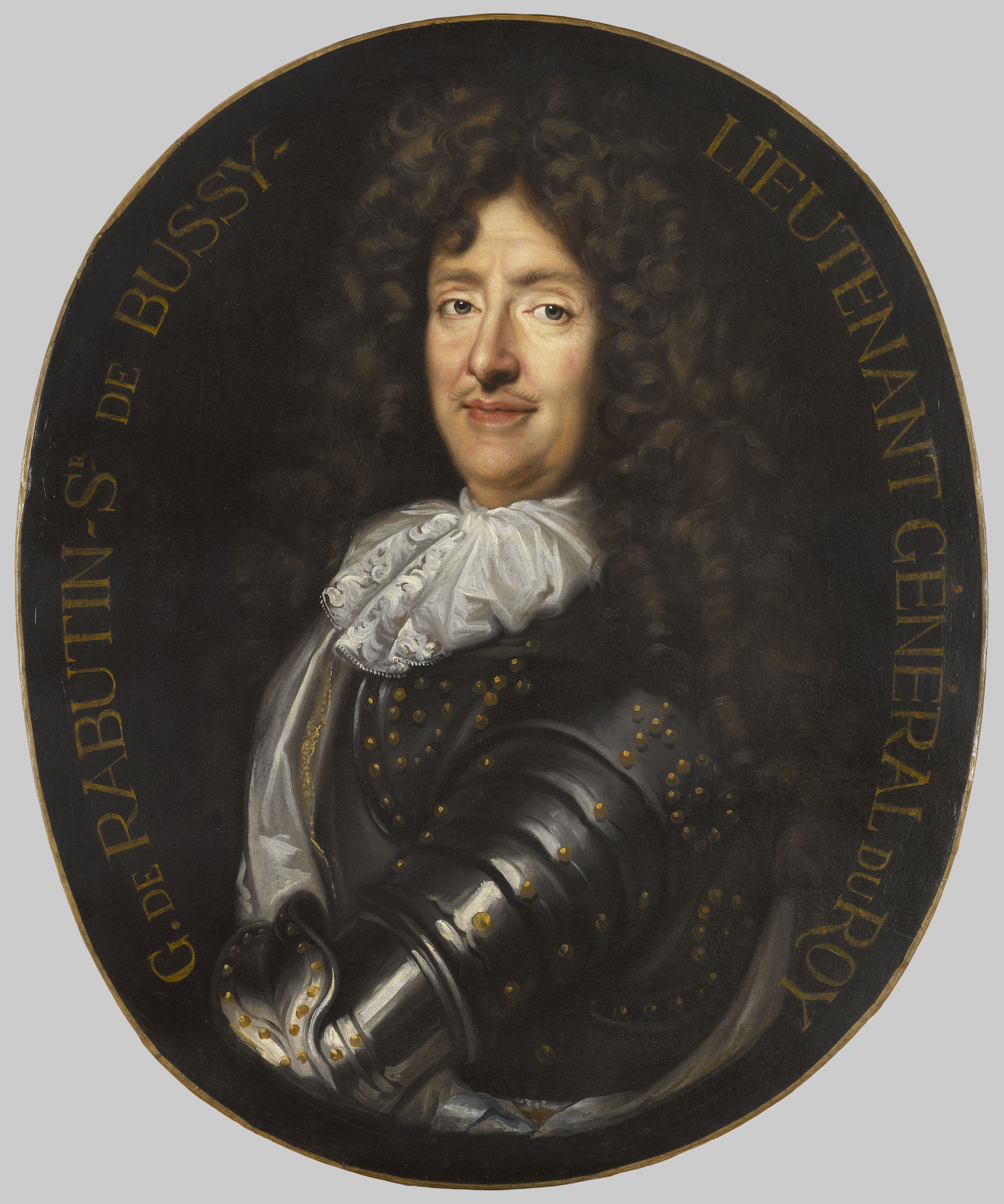
Roger de Rabutin, Comte de Bussy

- 8 January – Marguerite de la Sablière, salonist and polymath (born c.1640)
- 7 February – Paul Pellisson, writer (born 1624)
- 9 April – Roger de Rabutin, Comte de Bussy, memoirist (born 1618)
- 3 May – Claude de Rouvroy, duc de Saint-Simon, courtier (born 1607)
- 12 September – Gabrielle de Rochechouart de Mortemart, noblewoman (born 1633)
- 16 December – Jacques Rousseau, painter (born 1630)

=== Full date unknown ===
- Henri Justel, scholar and administrator (born 1620)
- François Duchesne, historian (born 1616)
- François de Poilly, engraver (born 1623)
