= 1692 in France =

- Decades: 1670s; 1680s; 1690s; 1700s; 1710s
- See also: History of France; Timeline of French history; List of years in France

Events from the year 1692 in France.

== Incumbents ==
- Monarch: Louis XIV

== Events ==
- Battle of Barfleur (29 May) was a decisive battle in the British Nine Years' War

== Births ==
- 5 April – Adrienne Lecouvreur, French actress (d. 1730)
- 6 November – Louis Racine, French poet (d. 1763)

== Deaths ==
- 23 July – Gilles Ménage, French scholar (b. 1613)
- 6 November – Gédéon Tallemant des Réaux, French writer (b. 1619)
