= 1708 in France =

- Decades: 1680s; 1690s; 1700s; 1710s; 1720s
- See also: History of France; Timeline of French history; List of years in France

Events from the year 1708 in France.

== Incumbents ==
- Monarch: Louis XIV

== Events ==
- 23 March - James Stuart, the "Old Pretender", having sailed from Dunkirk with 5000 French troops, with the intention of invading Britain, attempts to land in the Firth of Forth; the attempt is thwarted by the Royal Navy, under Admiral Byng.

== Births ==
- 10 January - Donat Nonnotte, painter (died 1785)
- 26 March - Louis Guillouet, comte d'Orvilliers, admiral (died 1792)
- 2 September - André le Breton, publisher (died 1779)

== Deaths ==
- 5 March - Charles Le Gobien, Jesuit writer (born 1653)
- 23 April - Jacques Gravier, Jesuit missionary (born 1651)
- 11 May - Jules Hardouin Mansart, architect (born 1646)
- 28 December - Joseph Pitton de Tournefort, botanist (born 1656)
