= 1705 in France =

- Decades: 1680s; 1690s; 1700s; 1710s; 1720s
- See also: History of France; Timeline of French history; List of years in France

Events from the year 1705 in France.

== Incumbents ==
- Monarch – Louis XIV

== Events ==
- 7 February – The Twelfth Siege of Gibraltar begins as Marshal René de Froulay de Tessé of the French Army supplements the Spanish forces of the Marquis of Villadarias and seizes control of a strategic fortress, the Round Tower, but the forces retreat after a counterattack kills 200 of their number in the retaking of the Tower
- 26 February – A French Navy fleet of 18 warships, commanded by Admiral Desjean, the Baron de Pointis arrives in the Bay of Gibraltar to aid the French and Spanish attempt to retake Gibraltar from Britain
- 31 March (20 March O.S.) – The Twelfth Siege of Gibraltar ends as a fleet of warships from the navies of England, Portugal and the Netherlands, commanded by English Admiral John Leake, arrives at the Bay of Gibraltar with 35 warships and English and Portuguese troops. In the battle that follows, five of the French Navy's ships are sunk and Admiral Desjean is fatally wounded, forcing a French and Spanish retreat
- 18 July – War of the Spanish Succession: At the Battle of Elixheim, fought near the city of Namur (in modern-day Belgium) is fought, as an exhausted group of soldiers under the command of England's Duke of Marlborough kills 3,000 French troops under the command of the Duc de Valleroy, and forces the retreat of the others, breaking the "Lines of Brabant"
- 16 August – The Battle of Cassano results in a tactical French victory
- 31 August–5 September – War of the Spanish Succession: The Siege of Zoutleeuw is carried out by the alliance of Dutch, English, Scottish and Holy Roman Empire troops against the French-held fortress of Zoutleeuw (in modern-day Belgium)
- The community Company of Mary is established

== Births ==
- 8 January – Jacques-François Blondel, architect (died 1774)
- 12 March – Noël Jourda de Vaux, French noble and general (died 1788)
- 22 March – Nicolas-Sébastien Adam, sculptor (died 1778)
- 18 August – Louis Phélypeaux, comte de Saint-Florentin (died 1777)
- 5 September – Élisabeth Alexandrine de Bourbon, princess of the blood (died 1765)
- 19 September – Marguerite-Antoinette Couperin, harpsichordist (died 1778)
- Full date missing – Justine Paris, courtesan and madam (died 1774)

== Deaths ==
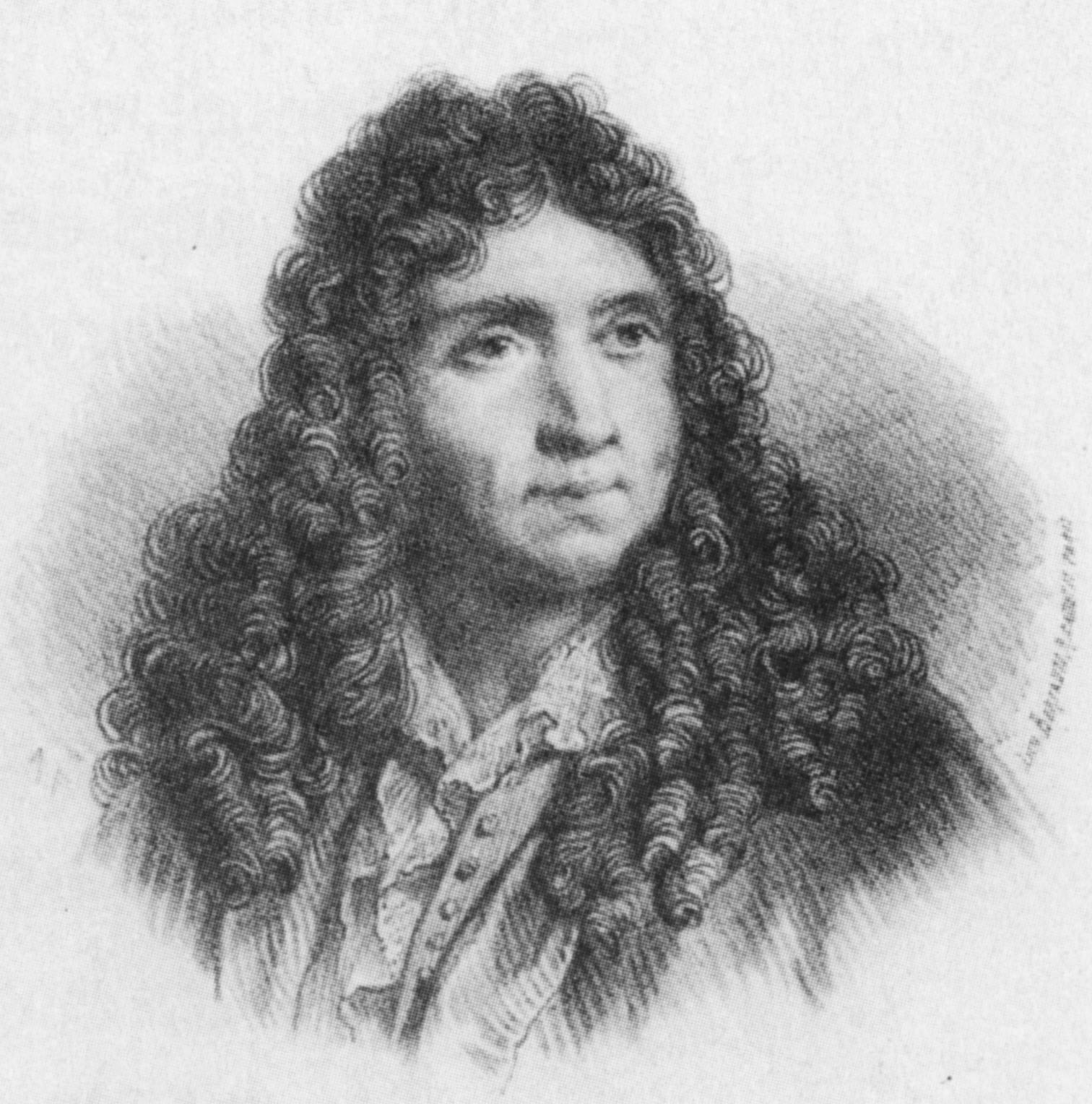
Pierre Beauchamp

- 10 January – Étienne Pavillon, lawyer and poet (born 1632)
- February – Pierre Beauchamp, choreographer, dancer and composer (born 1631)
- 5 February – Jean Gilles, composer (born 1668)
- 13 August – Françoise-Marguerite de Sévigné, comtesse de Grignan, aristocrat, beauty, wit and correspondent (born 1646)
- 11 October – Guillaume Amontons, scientific instrument inventor (born 1663)
- 17 October – Ninon de l'Enclos, writer, courtesan, and patron of the arts (born 1620)
