= Arlequin roi de Serendib =

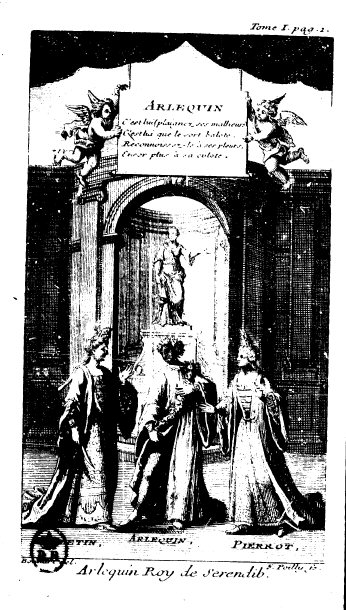
- Title plate from 1720 edition of Arlequin roi de Serendib
- Original language: French
- Written by: Alain-René Lesage
- Characters: Arlequin; Pierrot; Mezzetin the Grand Visir the Grand Sacrificer harem girls thieves
- Genre: farce
- Setting: Serendib

Premiere
- Date: 1713
- Place: Foire Saint-Germain

Arlequin roi de Serendib is a three-act farce by Alain-René Lesage. It was first performed at the Foire Saint-Germain in 1713. The setting is the island of Serendib (Sri Lanka), where Pierrot, Mezzetin, and Arlequin are marooned. Pierrot and Mezzetin cross-dress to pose as women and they become priestesses. Arlequin becomes kings, but learns that the reigns of local kings end when they are offered as human sacrifices to the gods by their subjects.

== Plot summary ==
After being marooned on the island of Serendib, Pierrot and Mezzetin are separated from Arlequin. Pierrot and Mezzetin, being familiar with the customs of the island, cross-dress as women to avoid being killed and are appointed priestesses by the natives. Arlequin, on the other hand, allows himself to be captured, and the natives crown him king. Arlequin enjoys some of the perks of kingship, including fancy meals, a formal portrait sitting, concubines, and a personal physician, before he discovers that the natives sacrifice their kings to their gods.

Before the sacrifice, however, Mezzetin creates a diversion, as he too would like to escape from Serendib where he is being courted by the Grand Visir. Mezzetin, Pierrot, and Arlequin escape to Paris.

== Characters ==
- Arlequin, king of Serendib
- Mezzetin, disguised as the grand priestess
- Pierrot, disguised as her confidente
- The Grand Visir
- The Grand Sacrificer
- A Painter
- A Doctor
- Harem girls
- A Greek girl
