= 1696 in France =

- Decades: 1670s; 1680s; 1690s; 1700s; 1710s
- See also: History of France; Timeline of French history; List of years in France

Events from the year 1696 in France.

== Incumbents ==
- Monarch – Louis XIV

== Events ==
- The Edict of 1696

This Edict stated that for a coat of arms to be valid, it had to be registered with the King of Arms for a fee. Due to this, 110 000 coats of arms were registered by d'Hozier, the King of Arms.

- Treaty of Turin

Signed on 29 August 1696 by the French King and the Duchy of Savoy, ended the latter's involvement in the Nine Years' War.

== Births ==
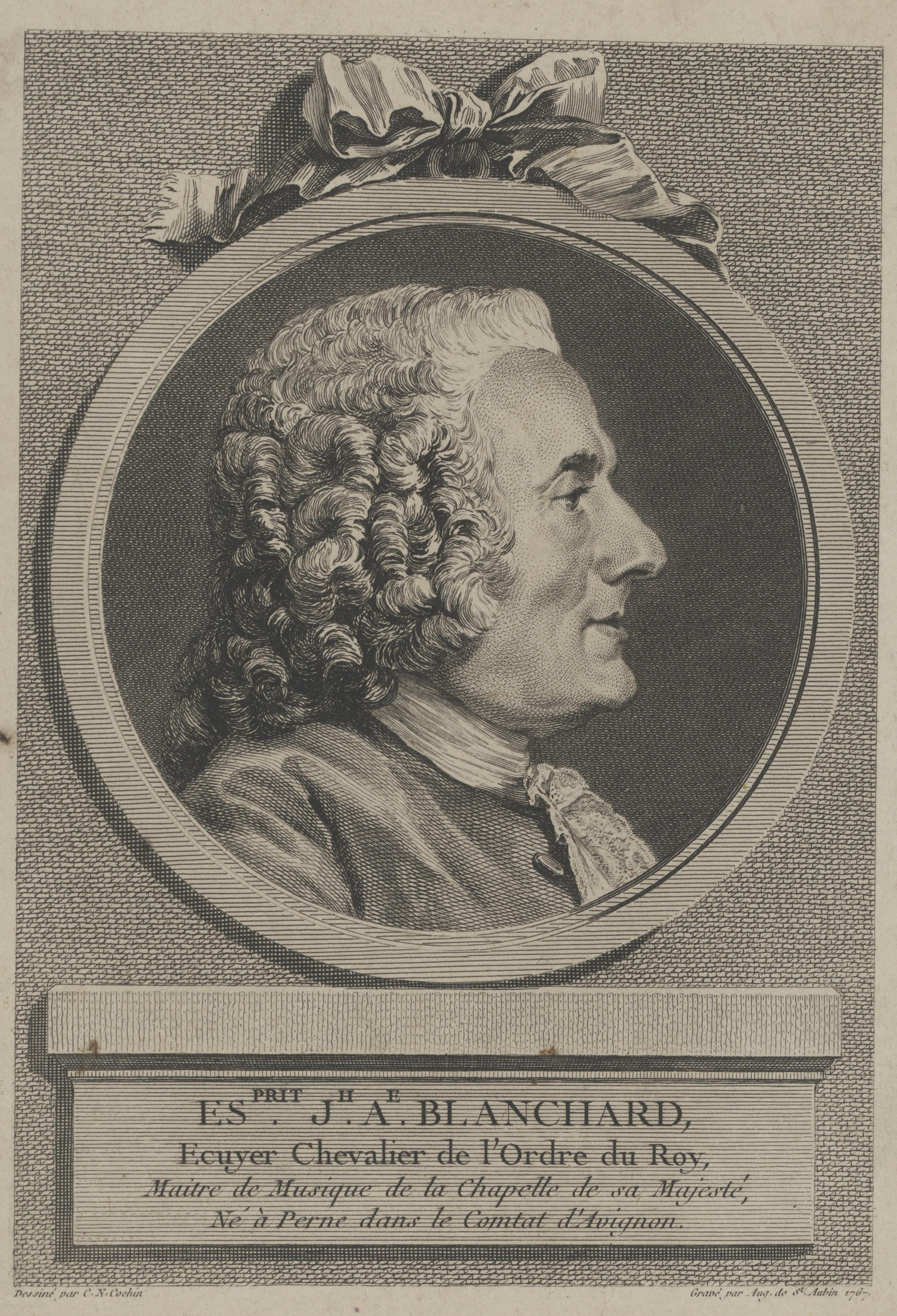
Esprit Antoine Blanchard

- 29 February – Esprit Antoine Blanchard, musician (died 1770)
- 31 July – Dumont de Montigny, colonial officer (died 1760)

== Deaths ==
- 14 March – Jean Domat, jurisconsult (born 1625)
- 14 April – Isaac de l'Ostal de Saint-Martin, chevalier (born c.1629)
- 17 April – Marie de Rabutin-Chantal, marquise de Sévigné, aristocrat (born 1626)
- 27 April – Simon Foucher, polemic philosopher (born 1644)
- 11 May – Jean de La Bruyère, philosopher and moralist (born 1645)
- 9 June – Antoine Varillas, historian (born 1624)
- 29 June – Michel Lambert, composer (born 1610)
- 28 July – Charles Colbert, marquis de Croissy, statesman and diplomat (born 1625)
- 21 December – Louise Moillon, painter (born 1610)

=== Full date unknown ===
- Jean Richer, astronomer (born 1630)
- Jean Baptiste Mathey, architect and painter (born 1630)
