= Turcaret =

Comedy by Alain-René Lesage

Turcaret (or Le Financier) is a comedy by Alain-René Lesage, first produced on 14 February 1709 at the Comédie-Française in Paris. It is considered one of Lesage's most important works.

The play shows clear signs of having been written by an admirer of Molière, and has much in common with his 1664 comedy Tartuffe.

== Plot ==
Turcaret is a ruthless, dishonest and dissolute financier. His vulgar wife is as dissolute as himself. A harebrained marquis, a knavish chevalier and a coquettish baroness, to whom Turcaret is attracted, are among the other highly comic characters.

== Bibliography ==
- Richard Parish, "Marine Chassée": A Reconsideration of the Dramatic Structure of Lesage's Turcaret. En marge du classicisme: Essays on the French Theatre from the Renaissance to the Enlightenment, ed. Alan Howe & Richard Waller, Liverpool, Liverpool UP; 1987, p. 173-199
