= 1774 in France =

- Decades: 1750s; 1760s; 1770s; 1780s; 1790s
- See also: History of France; Timeline of French history; List of years in France

Events from the year 1774 in France.

== Incumbents ==
- Monarch – Louis XV (until 10 May), then Louis XVI

== Events ==
- 10 May – Louis XV dies, and Louis XVI becomes the new king
- Louis XVI faces empty treasury
- Division of three estates

== Births ==
- 9 March – Louis Auguste Say, economist and businessman, founder of sugar refineries in Nantes and Paris (died 1840)

== Deaths ==
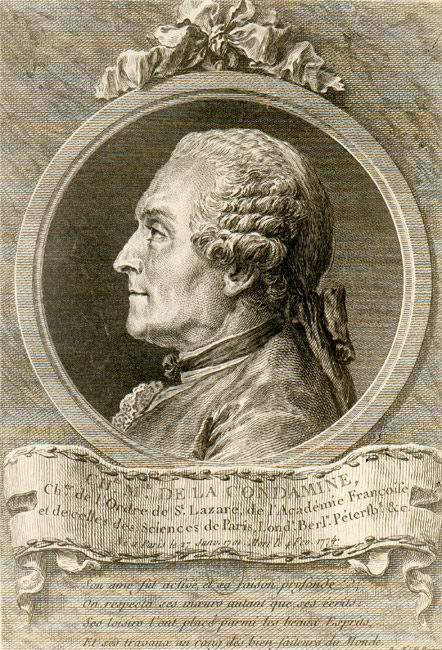
Charles Marie de La Condamine, explorer of the Amazon River

- 4 February – Charles Marie de La Condamine, explorer, geographer, and mathematician (born 1701)
- 24 April – Sara Banzet, educator and diarist (b. 1745)
- 10 May – Louis XV, King of France from 1715 (born 1710)
- 30 November – Nicolas-François Dupré de Saint-Maur, economist and statistician (born 1695)
- 16 December – François Quesnay, economist (born 1694)
- 29 December – Charles O'Brien, 7th Viscount Clare (born 1757)

=== Full date unknown ===
- Justine Paris, courtesan and madam (born 1705)
- Catherine Michelle de Maisonneuve, editor and writer
