= Crispin rival de son maître =

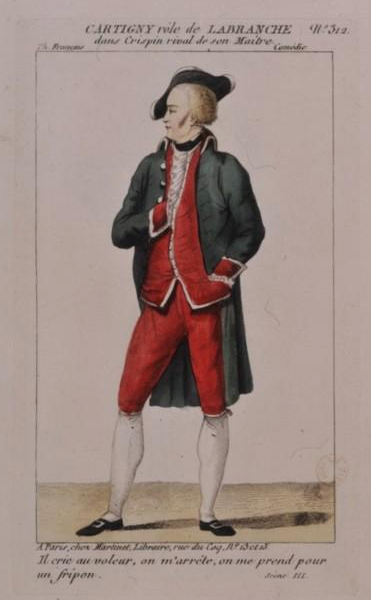
Actor Charles-Claude Cartigny in Crispin rival de son maître

Crispin rival de son maître (English: Crispin, his master's rival) is a farce in one act by Alain-René Lesage first produced in 1707. Its plot concerns the effort of a valet who, rather than try to further his master’s interests as is typical of the period, tries to supplant him in love and gain.
