= 1701 in France =

- Decades: 1680s; 1690s; 1700s; 1710s; 1720s
- See also: History of France; Timeline of French history; List of years in France

Events from the year 1701 in France.

== Incumbents ==
- Monarch – Louis XIV

== Events ==
- March – The War of the Spanish Succession begins. It is an international retaliation to Louis XIV’s acceptance in 1700 of the Spanish crown on behalf of his grandson Philip of Anjou, who became Philip V, first Bourbon king of Spain. Leopold I, Holy Roman Emperor forms the Grand Alliance with Great Britain, the Netherlands, Denmark, Portugal, Savoy and Prussia. Louis XIV allies France with Spain and Bavaria.
- 24 July – Foundation of a French emporium named Fort Ponchartrain (later to become Detroit).
- 4 August – The Great Peace of Montreal is signed, ending 100 years of war between the Iroquois Confederacy and New France and its Huron and Algonquian allies. Formerly allied with the English, the treaty assured the Iroquois would be neutral if France and England were to ever resume hostilities.

== Births ==
- 28 January – Charles Marie de La Condamine, French mathematician and geographer (d. 1774)
- 18 October – Charles le Beau, French historian (d. 1778)

== Deaths ==
- 15 March – Jean Renaud de Segrais, French writer (b. 1624)
- 2 June – Madeleine de Scudéry, French writer (b. 1607)
- 15 September – Edmé Boursault, French writer (b. 1638)
- 5 November – Charles Gerard, 2nd Earl of Macclesfield, French-born English politician (b. c.1659)
