= 1691 in France =

- Decades: 1670s; 1680s; 1690s; 1700s; 1710s
- See also: History of France; Timeline of French history; List of years in France

Events from the year 1691 in France.

== Incumbents ==
- Monarch – Louis XIV

== Events ==
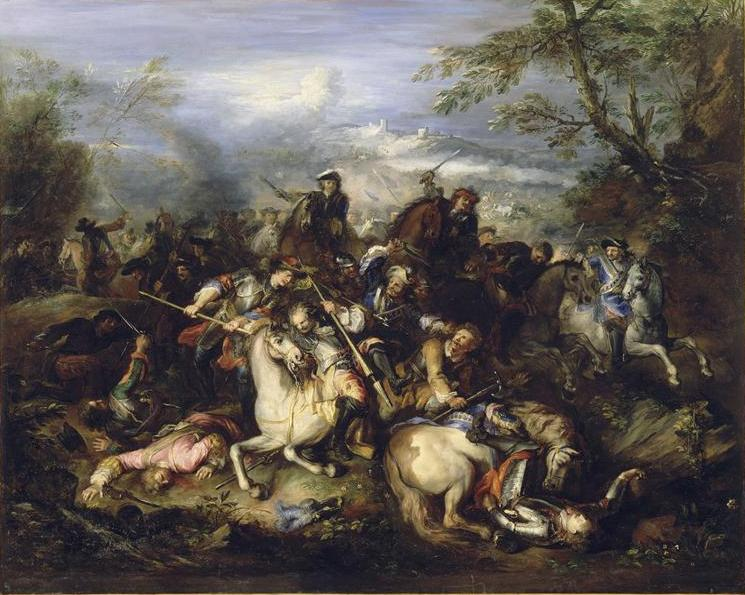
Battle of Leuze

- 18 September – Battle of Leuze

== Births ==
- 13 April - Joseph-Charles Roettiers, engraver and medalist (died 1779)
- 5 August - Charles d'Orléans de Rothelin, clergyman (died 1744)
- 18 December - Gaston-Laurent Coeurdoux, Jesuit missionary (died 1779)

=== Full date unknown ===
- François Alexandre Pierre de Garsault, botanist, zoologist and painter (died 1778)

== Deaths ==
- 5 March - Jean-Jacques Renouard de Villayer, member of the Conseil d'État (born 1607)
- 3 April - Jean Petitot, painter (born 1607)
