= 1698 in France =

- Decades: 1670s; 1680s; 1690s; 1700s; 1710s
- See also: History of France; Timeline of French history; List of years in France

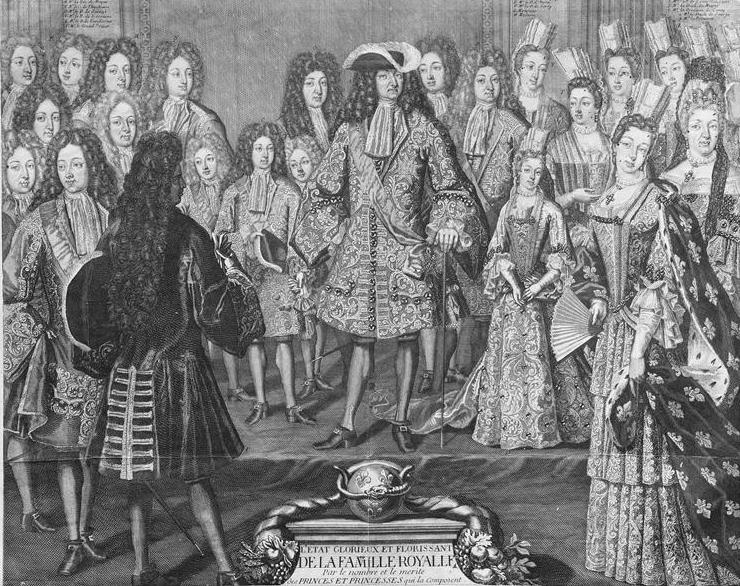

Events from the year 1698 in France.

== Incumbents ==
- Monarch: Louis XIV

== Events ==
- Today's Place Vendôme is created as the Place des Conquêtes in Paris.
- 24 October – Iberville and Bienville sail from Brest to the Gulf of Mexico to defend the southern borders of New France; they will eventually found three capitals of Louisiana (New France), as the future American cities: Mobile, Biloxi & New Orleans.

== Births ==
- 17 July – Pierre Louis Moreau de Maupertuis, French mathematician (d. 1759)
- 6 September – Jean Thurel, French soldier (d. 1807)

=== Full date unknown ===
- Bernard Forest de Bélidor, French engineer (d. 1761)

== Deaths ==
- 10 January – Louis-Sébastien Le Nain de Tillemont, French historian (b. 1637)
- 15 May – Marie Champmeslé, French actress (b. 1642)
- 28 November – Louis de Buade de Frontenac, Governor of New France (b. 1622)
