= 1702 in France =

- Decades: 1680s; 1690s; 1700s; 1710s; 1720s
- See also: History of France; Timeline of French history; List of years in France

Events from the year 1702 in France.

== Incumbents ==
- Monarch – Louis XIV

== Events ==
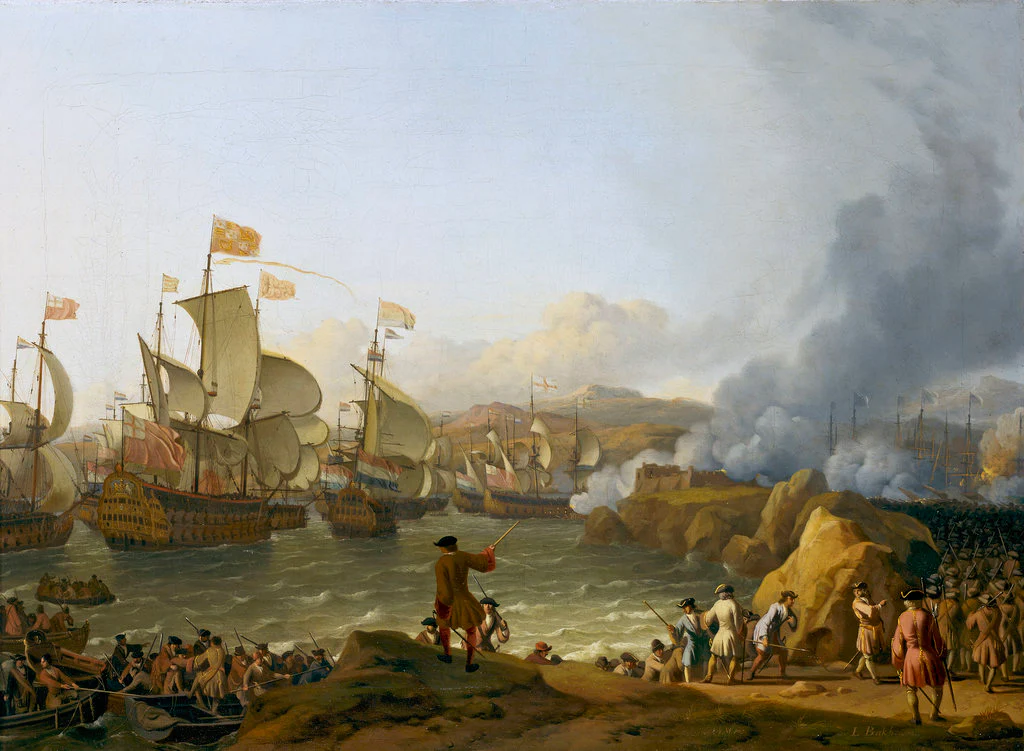
The Battle of Vigo Bay, painted by Ludolf Backhuysen

- 1 February – Battle of Cremona
- 16 June to 12 September – Siege of Landau
- 15 August – Battle of Luzzara
- 14 October – Battle of Friedlingen
- 23 October – Battle of Vigo Bay.

== Births ==
- 4 October – Honoré Armand de Villars, nobleman, soldier and politician (died 1770)

== Deaths ==
- 22 April – François Charpentier, archaeologist (born 1620)
- 27 May – Dominique Bouhours, Jesuit priest, essayist and grammarian (born 1628)
- 16 July – Nicolas Lebègue, composer (born c.1631)
- 15 August – Charles, Prince of Commercy, field marshal (born 1661)
- 16 September – Armand de Camboust, duc de Coislin, military officer (born 1635)
- 8 December – Chevalier de Lorraine, nobleman (born 1643)
