= 1689 in France =

- Decades: 1660s; 1670s; 1680s; 1690s; 1700s
- See also: History of France; Timeline of French history; List of years in France

Events from the year 1689 in France.

== Incumbents ==
- Monarch: Louis XIV

== Events ==
- 2 March – Nine Years' War: As French forces leave, they set fire to Heidelberg Castle and the nearby town of Heidelberg.
- 12 May – Nine Years' War: With England and the Netherlands both now ruled by William III, they join the Grand Alliance (League of Augsburg), thus escalating the conflict, which continues until 1697. This is also the effective beginning of King William's War, the first of four North American Wars until 1763 between English and French colonists, both sides allied to Native American tribes. The nature of the fighting is a series of raids on each other's settlements across the Canadian and New England borders.

== Births ==
- 18 January – Montesquieu, French writer (d. 1755)
- 9 July – Alexis Piron, French writer (d. 1773)
- 23 December – Joseph Bodin de Boismortier, French composer (d. 1755)
