= Djidjelli expedition =

1664 military expedition by Louis XIV

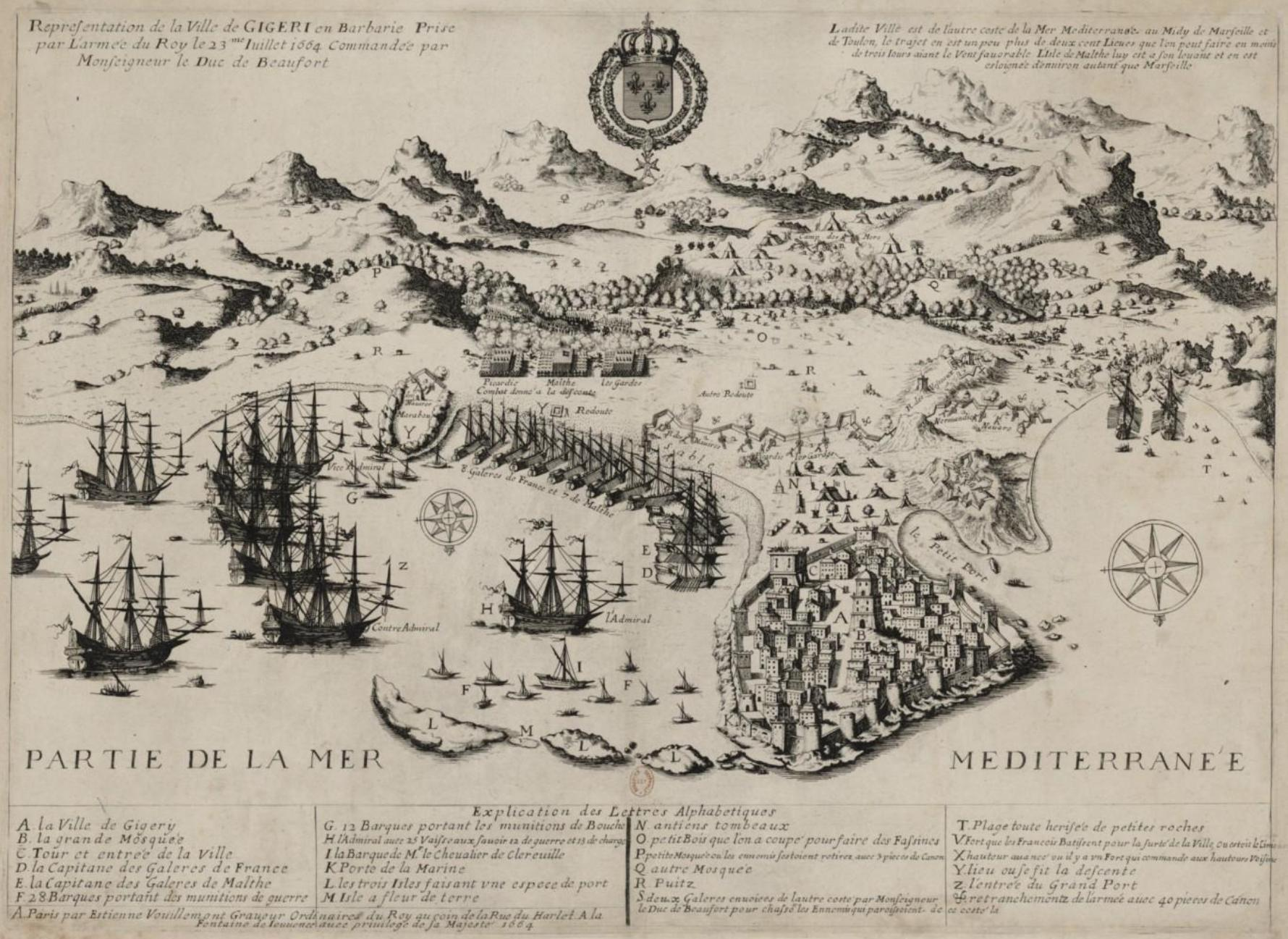
- French expedition to Djidjelli, 1664
Date	22 July - 30 October 1664
Location	Djidjelli, Algeria
Result	Algerian Victory

Belligerents
Regency of Algiers	Kingdom of France; Knights Hospitaller

Commanders and leaders
Mohammed Bey	Louis XIV; François de Vendôme, Duc de Beaufort; Charles-Félix de Galéan, Count of Gadagne

Strength
Unknown	Kingdom of France : 5,650 men 14 vessels 8 galleys Knights Hospitaller : 1 battalion 7 galleys

Casualties and losses
500 dead 200 wounded	2,000 killed 30 cast-iron cannon 15 iron cannon 50 mortars

The Djidjelli expedition was a 1664 military expedition by Louis XIV to seize the port of Djidjelli and establish a naval base against the Barbary corsairs. There was a disagreement among the leaders of the expedition as to what its objectives should be. Ultimately the town of Djidjelli was taken easily, but after three months, heavily besieged and deprived of reinforcements by an outbreak of plague, the French abandoned the city and returned home.

== Background ==
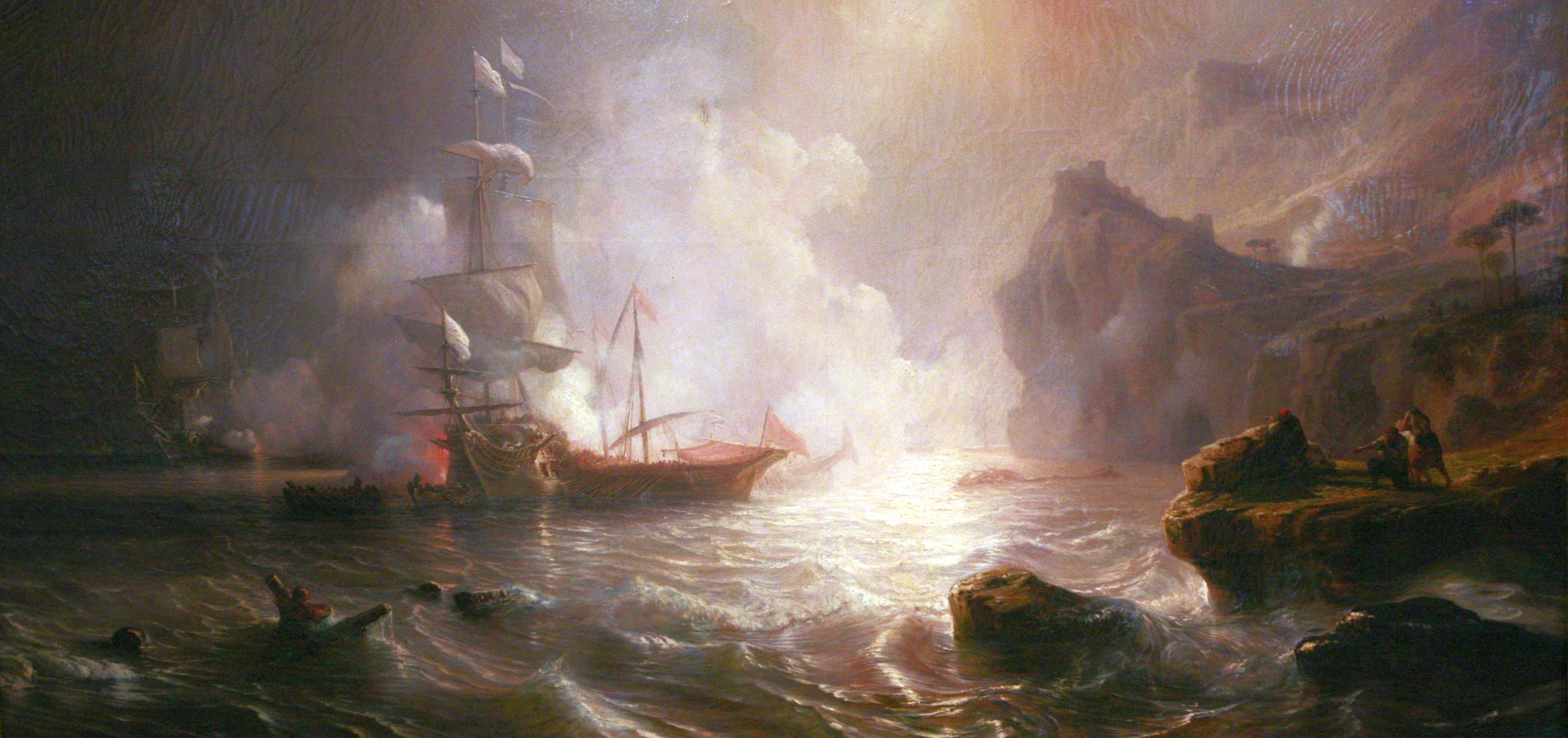
Battle between a French ship and two galleys from the Barbary Coast

The young king Louis XIV wanted to safeguard trade by the French merchant navy, which was continually being attacked by Barbary Coast pirates coming from the regencies of Algiers, Tunis and Tripoli, under Ottoman administration and protection.

The expedition chose to attack a city halfway between Algiers and Tunis. The plan was to seize and fortify it, using it as an advance post for attacks against the corsairs, as the English were then doing from Tangier. They considered Bougie, Bône and Skikda, near a French commercial outpost known as the Bastion de France, but eventually chose Djidjelli. This choice led to conflict between the commander of the expedition, his second in command, and the engineer in charge of fortifications. Even before the expedition embarked there was a disagreement between the Duke of Beaufort and the Count of Gadagne who wished to disembark at Bougie "then abandoned, better situated and more within reach of help than Djidjelli".

== Expedition ==
=== Taking of Djidjelli ===
The fleet mustered in Toulon on 2 July 1664 and made anchor at Bougie on 21 July after stopping in Menorca, where it was joined by Maltese galleys.

On the morning of 23 July 1664, the galleys advanced to shore and threatened the forces defending Djidjelli with their artillery, providing cover for the longboats (chaloupes) to ferry troops to shore near a landmark called le Marabout. The choice of this landing place, which contained a shrine and a cemetery, prompted increased resistance from the inhabitants.

The disembarking army consisted of about 4000 men, and the Maltese battalion 1200 men. The order was as follows: first the Picardy regiment commanded by M. de Vivonne disembarked, and then the Count of Gadagne at the head of the Maltese battalion, then the Duke of Beaufort and Maréchal de camp La Guillotiere. The royal troops took Djidjelli the same day without much difficulty. The Count of Vivonne met with stiffer resistance at Le Marabout, but the Kabyles soon abandoned their positions to retreat into the mountains and the expeditionary force set up camp for the night.

Heavy fighting took place the next day. The Moors were seen waving a white flag, so the order was given to cease fire. The French seized this opportunity to parley and establish friendly relations, but the Kabyles ambushed the expedition and caused serious casualties. The intervention of the Maltese battalion under Charles-Félix de Galéan counterattacked and drove off the raiders. The expedition lost 400 men and the Moors lost as many on their own side.

The forces opposing the expedition were the Kabyles of the kingdom of Koukou and of Béni Abbès. Because they were opposed to the Regency of Algiers, they at first refused its offer of military assistance against the Europeans. However, after failing to retake Djidjelli themselves they eventually allowed the troops of the bey of Constantine and of the Regency of Algiers to pass through their territories to reinforce them. However an attack on the city by Kabyles was repulsed by the French on 6 October 1664.

=== Reinforcement and retreat ===
On 20 September, to reinforce the initial expedition, a convoy of six vessels and six barques laden with foodstuffs left France for Africa. Military reinforcements followed shortly afterwards: Damien de Martel left Toulon on 18 October with a squadron consisting of the Dauphin (flagship), the Soleil, La Lune, the Notre-Dame, the Espérance (flûte) and the Triton (fireboat). He arrived in Djidjelli on 22 October carrying two cavalry companies from the regiment of Conti. The convoy also brought a message from the king, who had been informed of the discord between the heads of the expedition. It commanded the Duke of Beaufort to leave command of operations to de Gadagne. Beaufort and his fleet therefore left Djidjelli for good on 22 October.

With the outbreak of plague in Toulon, the departure of any further reinforcements or supplies was cancelled. Still besieged and judging Djidjelli too difficult to hold, the French demolished it's fortifications and abandoned it, taking ship during the night of 30–31 October 1664. First to be taken aboard were the unreliable elements among the troops, who were "saying out loud that they were going to become Turks". The retreat was carried out using Martel's vessels, which arrived in France on 22 October.

=== Wreck of La Lune ===
On its return to France, the fleet was sent into quarantine at île de Porquerolles by the Parlement de Provence because of the plague. La Lune, an old three-master, was already in pitiful condition and poorly-repaired. It broke in two and sank near Toulon, before the Îles d'Hyères, with ten companies of the Picardy regiment aboard. More than 700 men drowned, among them General de la Guillotière, one of the two maréchaux de camp of the Count de Gadagne. A hundred or so survivors managed to reach Port-Cros, but, abandoned on this desert island 7 km^{2}, they all starved. The captain of the ship, fr:François de Livenne de Verdille, and Antoine Boësset de La Villedieu (aide de camp of General de la Guillotière and son of Antoine Boësset) both managed to escape by swimming. There were only 24 survivors.

== Aftermath ==
On 25 August 1665, the Duke of Beaufort destroyed two Algerian corsair ships and captured three others. On one of the latter he found the artillery that had been abandoned at Djidjelli in October 1664.

A peace treaty was signed between the Duke of Beaufort and the Regency of Tunis on 25 November 1665. A second treaty was concluded with the Regency of Algiers on 17 May 1666. However, it was not until after the bombardment of Algiers by Admiral Duquesne in 1682 that the comptoir français of the Bastion de France re-opened.

== Documentaries ==
- Marie-Chantal Aiello, La Lune et le Roi Soleil: Retour sur une tragédie navale, (La Lune and the Sun King: Return to a Naval Tragedy), 13 Production, France 3 Méditerranée / C.M.C.A / IFREMER, 1994
- L'épave de la Lune, (The Wreck of La Lune), La Marche des sciences, France Culture, broadcast 12/07/2012 1

== See also ==
- Djidjelli
- Regency of Algiers
- Kingdom of Ait Abbas
- Kingdom of Kuku

== Bibliography ==
- Antoine Augustin Bruzen de La Martinière and Yves Joseph La Motte, Histoire de la vie et du règne de Louis XIV, (History of the Life and Reign of Louis XIV), vol. 3, J. Van Duren, 1741
- Louis XIV (1806). Œuvres de Louis XIV: Lettres particulières [Works of Louis XIV: Personal Letters]. Vol. V. Paris: Treuttel et Würtz.
- Ernest Mercier, Histoire de l'Afrique septentrionale (Berbérie) depuis les temps les plus reculés jusqu'à la conquête française (1830s) (History of North Africa (Barbary Coast) from Earliest Times to the French Conquest (1830s)), vol. 3, Ernest Leroux, Paris, 1891
- Guy Turbet-Delof, L'Affaire de Djidjelli (1664) dans la presse française du temps, (The Djidjelli Affair (1664) in the French Press of the Time), Taffard, 1968
- Bernard Bachelot, Louis XIV en Algérie: Gigeri 1664, (Louis XIV in Algeria: Higher 1664), Monaco, Éditions du Rocher, Art de la guerre collection, 2003 (reprint October 2011), 460 p. (ISBN 978-2-268-04832-1, OCLC 53374515)
- Bernard Bachelot and Michel Albert, Raison d'état (Reasons of State), Paris, L'Harmattan, 2009, 171 p. (ISBN 978-2-296-08423-0, OCLC 318870802)
- Bernard Bachelot, L'Expédition de Gigéri, 1664: Louis XIV en Algérie, (The Gigéri Expedition 1664: Louis XIV in Algeria) Les éditions Maison, Illustoria collection, 2014, 104 p. (ISBN 2-917575-48-4)
- Michel Vergé-Franceschi (dir.), Jean Kessler (scientific advisor) et al., Dictionnaire d'Histoire maritime, (Dictionary of Naval History), éditions Robert Laffont, Bouquins collection, 2002 (ISBN 9782221087510 and 9782221097441)
- Guy Le Moing, Les 600 plus grandes batailles navales de l'Histoire, (The 600 Greatest Naval Battles of History), Rennes, Marines Éditions, May 2011, 620 p. (ISBN 235743077X and 9782357430778, OCLC 743277419)
- Bachelot, Bernard (2003). Louis XIV en Algérie : Gigeri 1664 [Louis XIV in Algeria: Giger 1664]. Monaco: Rocher. ISBN 2268048322. Document used to draft article
