= 1695 in France =

- Decades: 1670s; 1680s; 1690s; 1700s; 1710s
- See also: History of France; Timeline of French history; List of years in France

Events from the year 1695 in France.

== Incumbents ==
- Monarch: Louis XIV

== Events ==
- 13–15 August – Nine Years' War: Bombardment of Brussels by French troops.
- 1 September – Nine Years' War: France surrenders Namur in the Spanish Netherlands to forces of the Grand Alliance led by King William III of England following the 2-month Siege of Namur.

== Births ==
- 2 May – Giovanni Niccolò Servandoni, French architect and painter (d. 1766)
- 3 May – Henri Pitot, French engineer (d. 1771)
- 26 August – Marie-Anne-Catherine Quinault, singer and composer (d. 1793)

== Deaths ==
- 4 January – François-Henri de Montmorency, duc de Luxembourg, Marshal of France (b. 1628)
- 13 April – Jean de la Fontaine, French writer noted for his fables (b. 1621)
- 11 June – André Félibien, French architect (b. 1619)
- 16 November – Pierre Nicole, French Jansensist (b. 1625)
- 8 December – Barthélemy d'Herbelot de Molainville, French orientalist (b. 1625)
