= 1690 in France =

- Decades: 1670s; 1680s; 1690s; 1700s; 1710s
- See also: History of France; Timeline of French history; List of years in France

Events from the year 1690 in France.

== Incumbents ==
- Monarch – Louis XIV

== Events ==
- 1 July – Battle of Fleurus
- 10 July – Battle of Beachy Head
- 18 August – Battle of Staffarda

== Births ==
- 22 November – François Colin de Blamont, violinist and composer (died 1760)

== Deaths ==
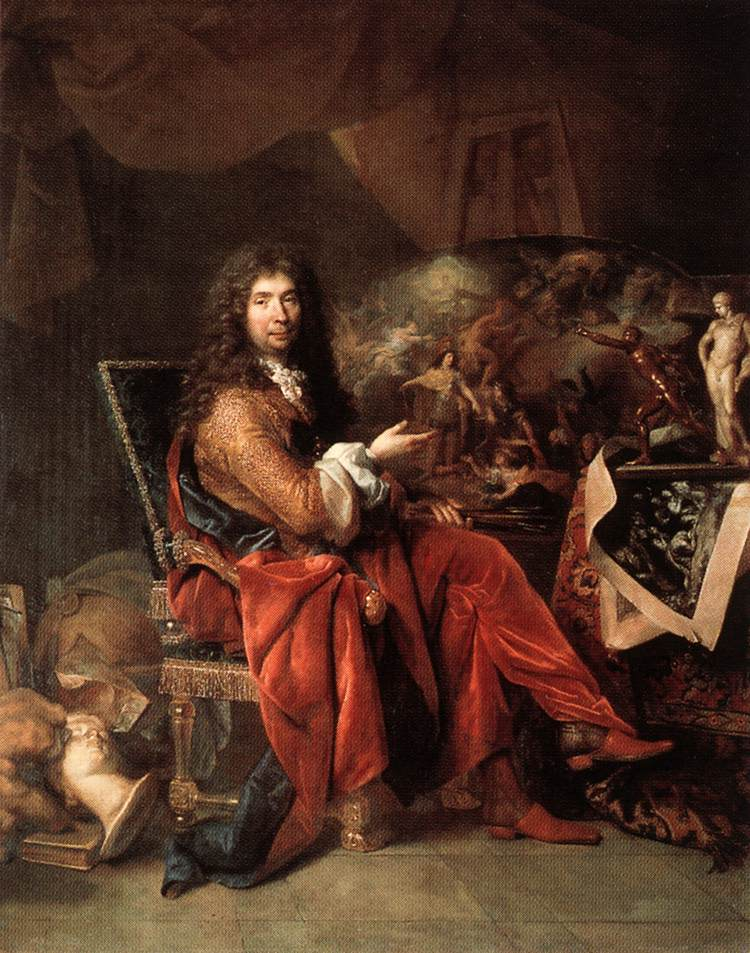
Charles Le Brun, portrait by Nicolas de Largilliere

- 22 February – Charles Le Brun, painter (born 1619)
- 20 April – Duchess Maria Anna Victoria of Bavaria (born 1660)
- 17 October – Margaret Mary Alacoque, Roman Catholic nun and mystic (born 1647)
- 3 November – Jean-Baptiste Colbert, Marquis de Seignelay, politician (born 1651)
- 17 November – Charles de Sainte-Maure, duc de Montausier, governor (born 1610)

=== Full date unknown ===
- François Bailly, architect (born 1630?)
- Louis-François de la Baume de Suze, bishop (born 1595)
