= Le Tombeau de Nostradamus =

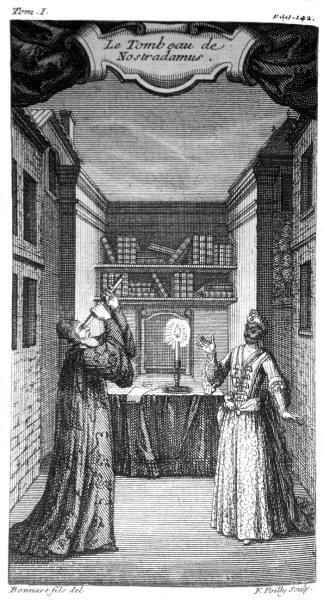
- Title plate from 1721 edition of Le Tombeau de Nostradamus
- Original language: French
- Written by: Alain-René Lesage
- Genre: farce
- Setting: the tomb of Nostradamus

Premiere
- Date: 1714
- Place: Foire de Saint Lauren

Le Tombeau de Nostradamus (English: The Tomb of Nostradamus) is a one-act farce by Alain-René Lesage. It was first performed at the Foire de Saint Laurent in 1714. Le Tombeau de Nostradamus is actually the final play in a series that includes La Foire de Guibray and Arlequin Mahomet. Between the three works, Lesage created a comedy in three acts.
