= Alain-René Lesage =

French novelist

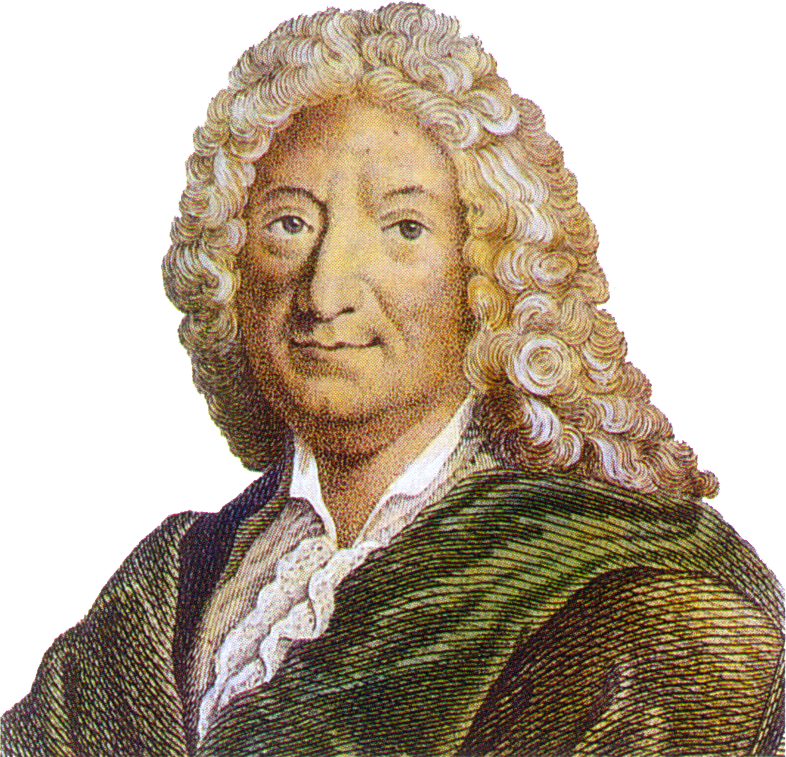
- Born: 6 May 1668; Sarzeau, Colonies Of Brittany, France
- Died: 17 November 1747 (aged 79); Boulogne-sur-Mer, Picardy, France
- Occupations: Novelist, playwright
- Writing career
- Period: Enlightenment

Alain-René Lesage (French pronunciation: [alɛ̃ ʁəne ləsaʒ]; 6 May 1668 – 17 November 1747; older spelling Le Sage) was a French novelist and playwright. Lesage is best known for his comic novel The Devil upon Two Sticks (1707, Le Diable boiteux), his comedy Turcaret (1709), and his picaresque novel Gil Blas (1715–1735).

== Life ==
=== Youth and education ===
Claude Lesage, the father of the novelist, held the united positions of advocate, notary and registrar of the royal court in Rhuys. His mother's name was Jeanne Brenugat. Both Lesage's father and mother died when Lesage was very young, and he was left in the care of his uncle who wasted his education and fortune. Bochard, of the Order of the Jesuits, Principal of the college in Vannes, became interested in the boy on account of his natural talents. Bochard cultivated Lesage's taste for literature. At age 25, Lesage went to Paris in 1693 "to pursue his philosophical studies".

In August 1694, he married the daughter of a joiner, Marie Elizabeth Huyard. She was beautiful but had no fortune, and Lesage had little practice. About this time he encountered an old schoolfellow, the dramatist Antoine Danchet, who is said to have advised him to take up literature. He began as a translator, and published in 1695 a French version of the Epistles of Aristaenetus, which was not successful. Shortly afterwards he found a valuable patron and adviser in the Abbé de Lyonne, who bestowed on him an annuity of 600 livres, and recommended him to exchange the classics for Spanish literature, of which he was himself a student and collector. Spanish literature was once very popular in France when the queens of the house of Austria sat upon the throne, but had become neglected by Lesage's time.

=== First literary efforts ===
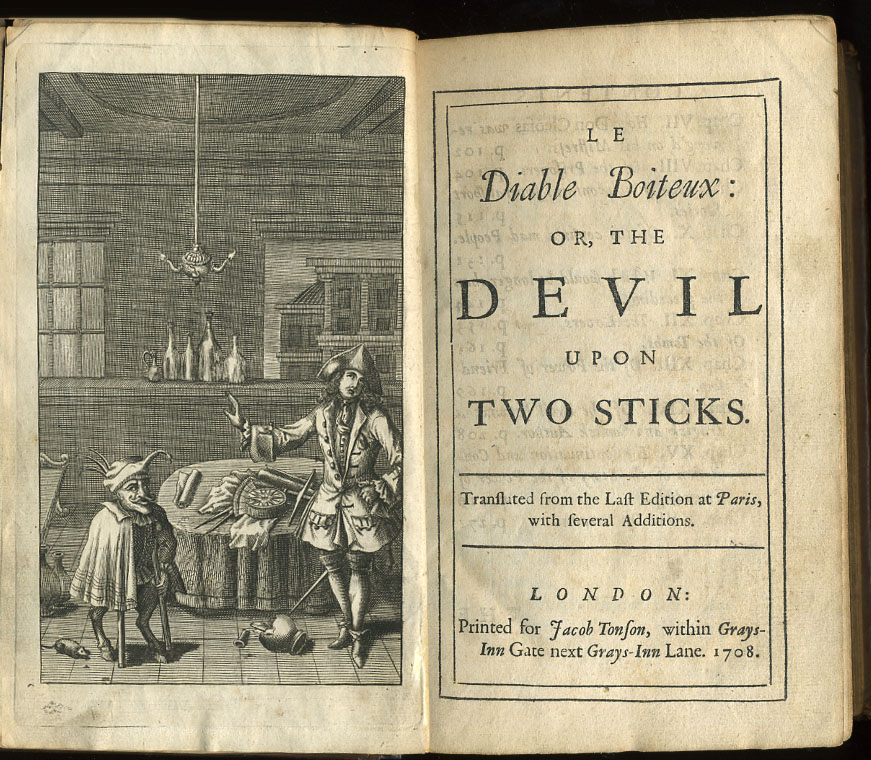
Frontispiece and titlepage of a 1708 English edition of The Devil upon Two Sticks, aka Le Diable boiteux.

Lesage began by translating plays chiefly from Francisco de Rojas Zorrilla and Lope de Vega. Le Traître puni and Le Point d'honneur from the former and Don Félix de Mendoce from the latter were acted or published in the first two or three years of the 18th century. In 1704, he translated the continuation of Don Quixote by Alonso Fernández de Avellaneda, and soon afterwards adapted a play from Pedro Calderón de la Barca, Don César Ursin, which was successful at court and damned in the city. Lesage was, however, nearly forty before he obtained decided success. In 1707, his farce, Crispin rival de son maître, was well received, and Le Diable boiteux (with a frontispiece by Louise-Magdeleine Horthemels) was published and ran to several editions. Lesage altered and improved this play in 1725, giving it its present form. Notwithstanding the success of Crispin, the actors did not like Lesage, and refused a small piece of his called Les Étrennes (1707). He thereupon altered it into Turcaret (1709), considered his theatrical masterpiece. Around this time his publisher Claude Barbin also asked Lesage to rework François Pétis de la Croix's translation of Turkish tales Les mille et un jours (1710–12) into marketable French, and included two of these stories at the end of the eighth volume of Antoine Galland's Les mille et une nuits (1709).

=== Prose writings ===
Some years passed before he again attempted romance writing, and then the first two parts of Gil Blas de Santillane were published in 1715, without the popularity of Le Diable boiteux. Lesage worked at it for a long time, and did not bring out the third part till 1724, nor the fourth till 1735. During these twenty years he was, however, continually busy. Notwithstanding the great merit and success of Turcaret and Crispin, the Théâtre Français did not welcome him, and in 1715 he began to write for the Théâtre de la foire, the comic opera held in booths at festival time. According to one computation he produced, either alone or with others, about a hundred pieces, varying from strings of songs with no regular dialogues, to comediettas only distinguished from regular plays by the introduction of music. He was also industrious in prose fiction. Besides finishing Gil Blas he translated the Orlando innamorato (1721), rearranged Guzman d'Alfarache (1732), published two more or less original novels, Le Bachelier de Salamanque and Estevanille Gonzalez, and in 1732 produced Les avantures de monsieur Robert Chevalier, dit de Beauchêne, capitaine de flibustiers dans la Nouvelle-France, which resembles certain works of Daniel Defoe. Besides all this, Lesage was also the author of La Valise trouvée, a collection of imaginary letters, and of some minor pieces including Une journée des Parques. He did not retire until 1740, when he was more than seventy years of age; he and his wife went to live with his second son, who was a canon at Boulogne-sur-Mer. Lesage's eldest son, Louis-André, had become an actor, and Lesage had disowned him. Lesage's last work, Mélange amusant de saillies d'esprit et de traits historiques les plus frappants, appeared in 1743.

=== Retirement ===
With his wife he had three sons and a daughter whose filial piety made her devote her entire life to serving her genius father. Though he lived happily, one event embittered Lesage for years. His eldest son had been educated for the bar, but insisted going on stage. Lesage, who had often painted the life of the actor in the most ridiculous and hateful aspect, was pained by his son's career choice, especially when his son joined the Théâtre Français, against which Lesage had long waged a satirical war. Probably out of deference to his father, the son took the name Montménil, and by the merit of his talents and private character, soon entered the upper society of Paris. Lesage was reconciled with his son many years later and became so devoted to Montménil that he could barely leave his side.

Montménil caught cold during a hunting party and died on 8 September 1743. This was such a severe blow to Lesage that he retired forever from Paris and the world. Lesage's youngest son had also become an actor under the name Pittenec, so Lesage and his wife saw out their old age in the home of their second son who had become the Abbé Lesage. This son had been made a Canon of the Cathedral of Boulogne, through the patronage of the queen, and been bestowed a fair pension.

Lesage lived beyond 80 years of age, but was afflicted with deafness and had to use an ear trumpet. However, his conversation was so delightful that when he ventured into the world and frequented his favourite coffee house in Rue St. Jacques in Paris, guests would gather around him, climbing onto tables and chairs, to hear his famous words of wit and wisdom.

Alain-René Lesage died on 17 November 1747.

== Personality ==
Very little is known of Lesage's life and personality. Various anecdotes represent him as a very independent man, declining to accept the literary patronage required to survive. One story tells of the time he had been entreated to read his manuscript (according to the fashion of the day) at the Hôtel de Bouillon by the Duchess. The hour appointed for the reading was noon, but the dramatist was still very interested in legal matters and was detained until 1 o'clock attending the decision of a lawsuit. When he finally appeared at the Hôtel and attempted to apologise, the Duchess of Bouillon was so cold and haughty, observing that he had made her guests lose one hour waiting for his arrival. "It is easy to make up the loss madame", replied Lesage; "I will not read my comedy, and thus you will gain two hours." With that, he left the Hôtel and could never be persuaded to return to the Duchess's house.

=== Quotations ===
- "Pride and conceit were the original sins of man."
- "Facts are stubborn things."

== Works ==
=== Translations and adaptations ===
- Le Traître puni, 1700
- Don Félix de Mendoce, 1700
- Point d'honneur, 1702 (French version)
- Second Book of the Ingenious Knight Don Quixote of La Mancha, 1704
- Orlando innamorato, 1721
- Guzman d'Alfarache, 1732 (French version)

=== Plays ===
- Don César Ursin, 1707 (French version)
- Les Étrennes, 1707
- Crispin rival de son maître, 1707 (French version)
- Turcaret, 1709
- Arlequin roi de Serendib, 1713
- La Foire de Guibray, 1714
- Arlequin Mahomet, 1714
- La Statue merveilleuse (fair play, with d'Orneval), 1720 ( French version)
- La Boîte de Pandore 1721, comedy in 1 act.

==== La Foire de Guibray ====
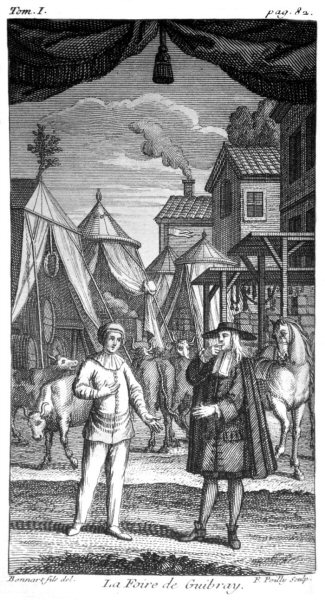
Title plate from 1721 edition of La Foire de Guibray

La Foire de Guibray (English: The Guibray Fair) is a one-act farce by Lesage. La Foire de Guibray is actually a prologue to two other one-act farces by Lesage, Arlequin Mahomet and Le Tombeau de Nostradamus. The three works comprise a comedy in three acts. It was first performed at the Foire de Saint Laurent in 1714.

In the play, Arlequin and Scaramouche are thieves posing as Arab actors to avoid suspicion. Arlequin enters a competition against an actual actor, and each of them has to perform a play. Arlequin and Scaramouche come to the Guibray Fair, a horse-trading fair in pastoral Normandy, to steal from the merchants there. When Scaramouche talks about how scared he is of the judge of the town, Arlequin suggests that they disguise themselves as Arab actors to avoid suspicion. Meanwhile, the judge and Pierrot walk through the fair watching the various theatrical and musical acts. An Italian actor offers to entertain the judge, when Arlequin walks up and proposes his own play. The judge suggests a competition between the two. Arlequin will perform Arlequin Mahomet, and the Italian will perform Le Tombeau de Nostradamus.

Characters:

- The judge of Guibray
- Pierrot, his secretary
- Arlequin, a thief posing as an Arab actor
- Scaramouche, a thief posing as an Arab actor
- An Italian actor
- Two actresses
- A musician

=== Novels ===
- Le Diable boiteux, 1707. (French version) (tr. The Devil upon Two Sticks, The Devil on Two Sticks; English version)
- Gil Blas (English version, French)
  - Histoire de Gil Blas de Santillane, (Livres I–VI), 1715. (French version)
  - Histoire de Gil Blas de Santillane, (Livres VII–IX), 1724. (French version)
  - Histoire de Gil Blas de Santillane, (Livres X–XII), 1735. (French version)
  - Histoire de Gil Blas de Santillane, 1747.
- Les avantures de monsieur Robert Chevalier, dit de Beauchêne, capitaine de flibustiers dans la Nouvelle-France, 1732 (French version)
- Le Bachelier de Salamanque, 1736. (French version)
- Estevanille Gonzalez, 1732
- Alain-René Lesage at Standard Ebooks La Valise trouvée, 1740 (French version)
- Mélange amusant de saillies d'esprit et de traits historiques les plus frappants, 1743

== Bibliography ==
- Francis Assaf - Lesage et le picaresque (A.-G. Nizet, 1983) ISBN 2-7078-1032-0
- Christelle Bahier-Porte - La Poétique d'Alain-René Lesage (Champion, 2006) ISBN 978-2-7453-1406-2
- V. Barberet - Lesage et le théâtre de la foire (Paul Sordoillet, 1887), (Slatkine Reprints, 1970)
- Roger Laufer - Lesage; ou, Le métier de romancier (Gallimard, 1971)
- Tobias Smollet's Prefatory Memoir in his 1893 English translation of Le Sage's "The Adventures of Gil Blas"
