= 1771 in France =

- Decades: 1750s; 1760s; 1770s; 1780s; 1790s
- See also: History of France; Timeline of French history; List of years in France

Events from the year 1771 in France.

== Incumbents ==
- Monarch – Louis XV

== Events ==
- Limoges porcelain manufacture is established

== Births ==
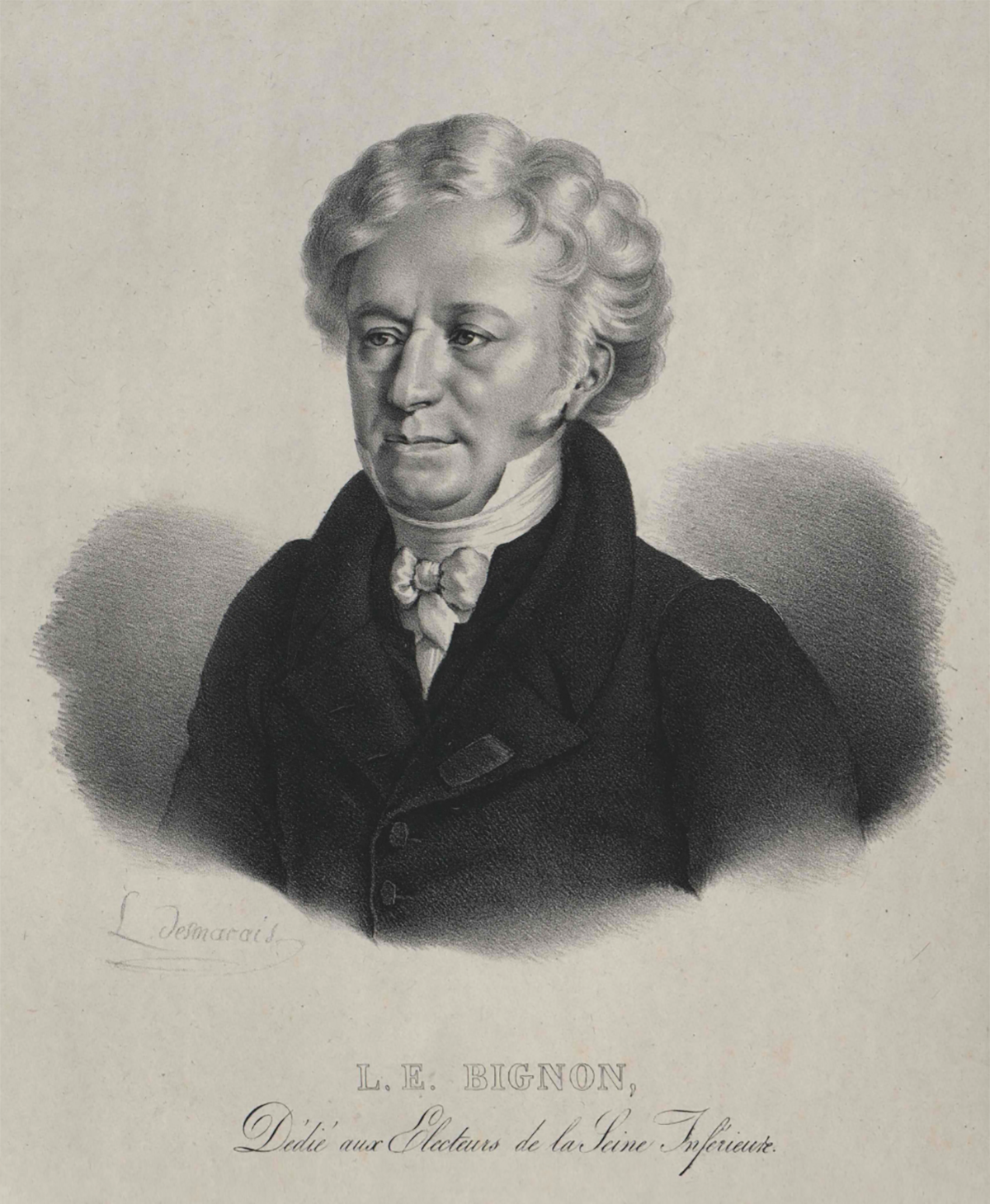
Louis Pierre Édouard, Baron Bignon

- 3 January – Louis Pierre Édouard, Baron Bignon, diplomat and historian (died 1841)
- 19 June – Joseph Diaz Gergonne, mathematician and logician (died 1859)
- 24 June – Éleuthère Irénée du Pont, chemical manufacturer (died 1834 in the United States)
- 18 August – Louis-François Bertin de Vaux, journalist (died 1842)

== Deaths ==
- 20 February – Jean-Jacques d'Ortous de Mairan, geophysicist, astronomer and chronobiologist (born 1678)
- 27 December – Henri Pitot, hydraulic engineer, inventor of the pitot tube (born 1695)
