= 1712 in France =

- Decades: 1690s; 1700s; 1710s; 1720s; 1730s
- See also: History of France; Timeline of French history; List of years in France

Events from the year 1712 in France.

== Incumbents ==
- Monarch – Louis XIV

== Events ==
- March – Cassard expedition sets out
- 24 July – Battle of Denain

== Arts and culture ==
- 12 January – The première of the opera Idoménée by André Campra takes place at the Théâtre du Palais-Royal in Paris
- 27 December – The première of the opera Callirhoé by André Cardinal Destouches takes place at the Théâtre du Palais-Royal in Paris

== Births ==
- 2 January – Marie-Angélique Memmie Le Blanc, feral child (died 1775)
- 28 February – Louis-Joseph de Montcalm, general (died 1759)
- 14 March – Charles-Antoine Jombert, bookseller and publisher (died 1784)
- 27 March – Claude Bourgelat, veterinary surgeon (died 1779)
- 8 April – Pierre Pouchot, military engineer officer (died 1769)
- 17 May – Jean-Baptiste Greppo, canon and archaeologist (died 1767)
- 28 May – Jacques Claude Marie Vincent de Gournay, economist (died 1759)
- 21 June – Luc Urbain de Bouëxic, comte de Guichen, admiral (died 1790)
- 25 June – Exupere Joseph Bertin, anatomist (died 1781)
- 9 July – Charles-Étienne Pesselier, playwright and librettist (died 1763)
- 15 August – César Gabriel de Choiseul, officer and statesman (died 1785)
- 24 August – Michel-Barthélémy Ollivier, painter and engraver (died 1784)
- 15 September – Pierre Simon Fournier, punch-cutter (died 1768)
- 22 September – François-Joseph-Gaston de Partz de Pressy, cleric (died 1789)
- 26 September – Dominique de La Rochefoucauld, cardinal (died 1800)
- 4 November – Charles Louis de Marbeuf, general (died 1786)
- 7 November – Antoine Choquet de Lindu, architect (died 1790)
- 20 November – Guillaume Voiriot, portrait painter (died 1799)
- 24 November – Charles-Michel de l'Épée, priest and educator of the deaf (died 1789)
- 12 December
  - Prince Charles Alexander of Lorraine, Lorraine-born Austrian general and soldier (died 1780)
  - François-Antoine Devaux, Lorraine-born poet and man of letters (died 1796)
- Approximate date – Angélique du Coudray, pioneer of modern midwifery (died 1794)

== Deaths ==
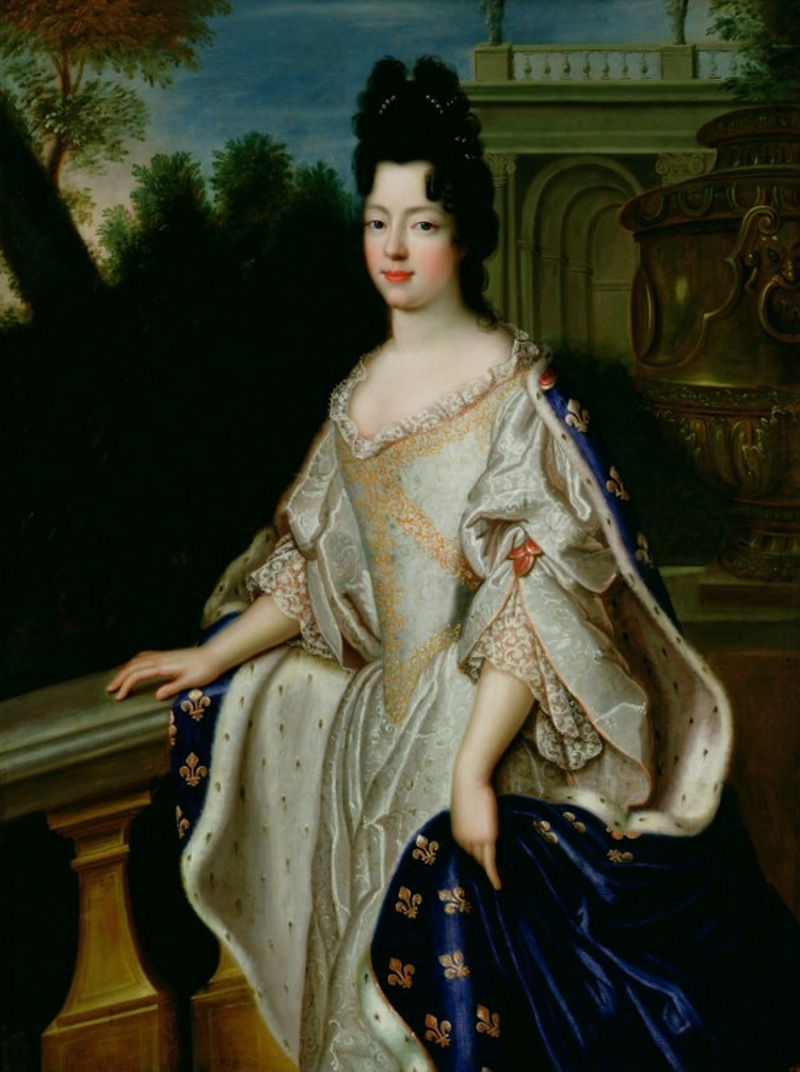
Princess Marie Adélaïde, Dauphine of France

- 12 January – Jean-Baptiste-Joseph de Coriolis de Villeneuve d'Espinouse, aristocrat (born 1655)
- 12 February – Marie Adélaïde of Savoy, Dauphine of France (born 1685)
- 18 February – Louis, Duke of Burgundy, Dauphin of France (born 1682)
- 22 February – Nicolas Catinat, military officer (born 1637)
- 8 March – Louis, Duke of Brittany (born 1707)
- 11 April – Richard Simon, priest, Oratorian, biblical critic, orientalist and controversialist (born 1638)
- 11 June – Louis Joseph, Duke of Vendôme, military commander (born 1654)
- 13 July – Isaac de Porthau, Gascon black musketeer of the Maison du Roi (born 1617)
- 9 September – Jean Mauger, medallist (born 1648)
- 14 September – Giovanni Domenico Cassini, Italian-born astronomer and engineer (born 1625)
- 5 November – Charles Honoré d'Albert, duc de Luynes, noble (born 1646)

=== Full date unknown ===
- Jean-Baptiste Forest, landscape painter (born 1636)
