= Jean Testu de Mauroy =

Jean Testu de Mauroy (1626, Paris – April 1706, Paris) was a French clergyman and academic. He was the member elected to occupy seat 4 of the Académie française in 1688.
