= Antoine Yart =

French poet and translator

Antoine Yart (1710–1791) was a French poet and translator.
