= 1711 in France =

- Decades: 1690s; 1700s; 1710s; 1720s; 1730s
- See also: History of France; Timeline of French history; List of years in France

Events from the year 1711 in France.

== Incumbents ==
- Monarch – Louis XIV

== Events ==
- 3 April – Clipperton Island in the Pacific is rediscovered by Martin de Chassiron and Michel Du Bocage, who claim it for France and map it.
- 9 August–12 September – Siege of Bouchain (War of the Spanish Succession): the Duke of Marlborough breaks through the French lines.
- 11 October – 245 people are killed in a crush on the Pont de la Guillotière in Lyon, caused when a large crowd returning from a festival on the other side of the Rhône becomes trapped against an obstruction in the middle of the bridge caused by a collision between a carriage and a cart.

== Births ==
- 23 February – Louis de Brienne de Conflans d'Armentières, general (died 1774)
- 26 April – Jeanne-Marie Leprince de Beaumont, writer (died 1780)
- 22 May – Guillaume du Tillot, politician (died 1774)
- 7 June – François Jacquier, Franciscan mathematician and physicist (died 1788)
- 12 June – Louis Legrand, Sulpician priest and theologian (died 1780)
- 26 July – Jacques Hardouin-Mansart de Sagonne, architect (died 1778)
- 29 July – Claude-Adrien Nonnotte, writer (died 1793)
- 19 August – Gabriel de Solages, soldier and industrialist (died 1799)
- 2 September – Noël Hallé, painter, draughtsman and printmaker (died 1781)
- 23 September – Louis Nicolas Victor de Félix d'Ollières, Marshal of France (died 1775)
- 21 October – Armand-Jérôme Bignon, lawyer (died 1772)
- 25 December – Jean-Joseph de Mondonville, composer and violinist (died 1772)

== Deaths ==
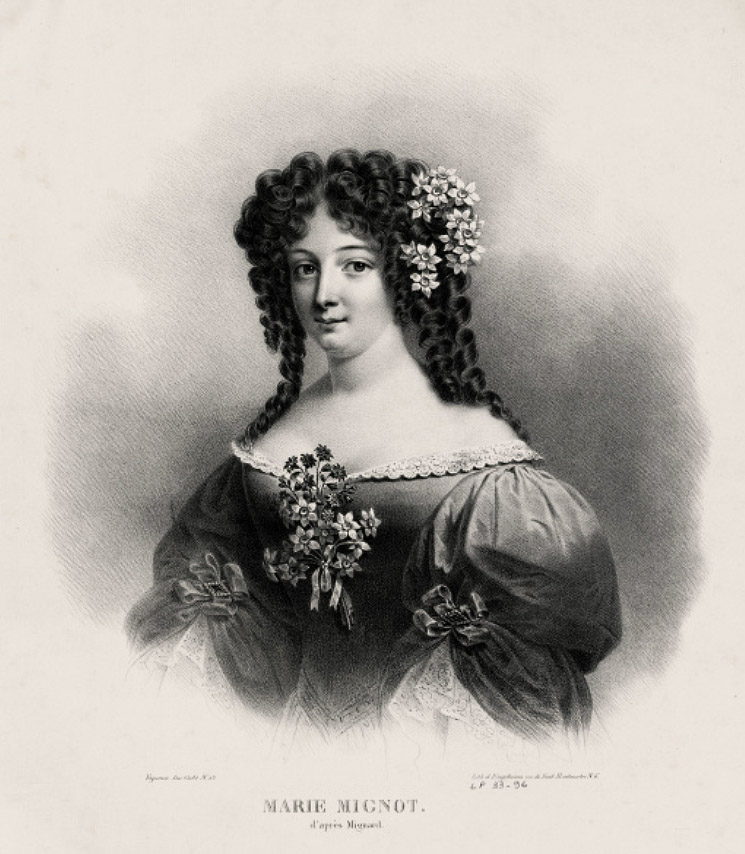
Claudine Françoise Mignot

- 24 January – Jean Bérain the Elder, draughtsman, designer, painter and engraver (born 1640)
- 27 January – Antoine de Pas de Feuquières, soldier (born 1648)
- 26 February – Claude Frassen, theologian and philosopher (born 1620)
- 13 March – Nicolas Boileau-Despréaux, poet and critic (born 1636)
- 29 March – Gabriel Gerberon, Jansenist monk (born 1628)
- 11 April – François Lamy, Benedictine theologian (born 1636)
- 14 April – Louis, Grand Dauphin, son of Louis XIV (born 1661)
- 17 April – Louis Carré, mathematician (born 1663)
- 4 May – Princess Élisabeth Charlotte of Lorraine (born 1700)
- 31 August – Jean Le Pelletier, polygraph and alchemist (born 1633)
- 3 September – Élisabeth Sophie Chéron, painter, musician and poet (born 1648)
- 14 September – Claude Aveneau, missionary (born 1650)
- 30 November – Claudine Françoise Mignot, adventuress (born 1624)

=== Full date unknown ===
- Étienne Baudet, engraver (born 1636)
