= Arlequin Mahomet =

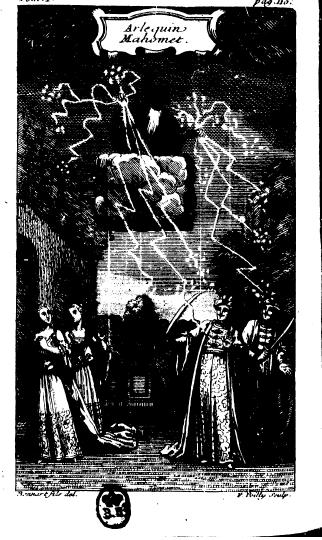
- Title plate from 1721 edition of Arlequin Mahomet
- Original language: French
- Written by: Alain-René Lesage
- Characters: Arlequin; Dahi; Boubekir; The King of Basra; A princess A Kam; The Prince of Persia; A servant
- Genre: farce
- Setting: Surate and Basra

Premiere
- Date: 1714
- Place: Foire de Saint Laurent

Arlequin Mahomet (English: Harlequin Mohammed) is a one act farce by Alain-René Lesage. It was first performed at the Foire de Saint Laurent in 1714. Arlequin Mahomet was performed as the second play in a series consisting of La Foire de Guibray and Le Tombeau de Nostradamus. Between the three works, Lesage created a comedy in three acts.

The play uses a frame story about a flying machine to explain how Arlequin traveled from his country (presumably France) to Persia, which is the main setting of the play. An unnamed Prince of Persia wants to marry the Princess of Basra, but his beloved is pressured into an arranged marriage with the Kam of the Tartars. Arlequin volunteers to help the star-crossed lovers, and he poses as the prophet Mohammed (Muhammad) in the process.

== Plot summary ==
Arlequin is being pursued by his debtors, so his friend Boubekir gives him a flying box so that he can flee the country. As he is flying over Persia, he sees a young man about to kill himself because his true love, the Princess of Basra, is to be married to the Kam of the Tartars (played by Pierrot from La Foire de Guibray). Arlequin agrees to help.

He flies to the princess who does not want to marry the Kam and is praying to Mohammed. When she sees Arlequin in his flying machine, she believes that he is Mohammed. Arlequin tells her that she does not have to marry the Kam and presents her with a portrait of her future husband, the Prince of Persia. The Princess tells her father about this revelation, and the King and the Kam go in search of the "false Arlequin." Meanwhile, Arlequin enters the scene and flies over their heads. Arlequin beats them with his stick until the King and the Kam agree that the princess should marry the Prince. Arlequin brings the Prince to the court in his flying machine, so he can marry the princess. Arlequin, in turn, marries the princess' servant.

== Characters ==
- Arlequin, a false Mohammed
- Dahi, a merchant, the neighbor of Arlequin
- Boubekir, traveler and mathematician
- The King of Baraasa
- The Princess, his daughter
- The Kam of the Tartars
- The Prince of Persia
- A servant

== Productions ==
An Englishman named Baxter played the harlequin in Arlequin Mohamet on the French stage in 1714.
