= 1773 in France =

- Decades: 1750s; 1760s; 1770s; 1780s; 1790s
- See also: History of France; Timeline of French history; List of years in France

Events from the year 1773 in France.

== Incumbents ==
- Monarch – Louis XV

== Events ==
- 24 February – Decision of the council reorganizing recovery of the poll tax on the bourgeoisie of Paris. Rents are recorded by Intendant Bertier de Sauvigny and the tax is calculated proportionally; the tax yield increases from 850,000 livres to 1,400,000 livres.
- 7 April or 24 May – Freemasonry in France: The 200 masonic lodges are reorganized within the Grand Orient de France in a vast relational system hierarchized by affiliation.
- 9 May – Hunger riots in Bordeaux.
- 13 October – Astronomer Charles Messier discovers the Whirlpool Galaxy, an interacting, grand design spiral galaxy located at a distance of approximately 31 million light-years, in the constellation Canes Venatici.
- Lagrange presents his work on the secular equation of the Moon to the Académie Française, introducing the idea of the potential of a body. He also publishes on the attraction of ellipsoids and other mathematical matters.
- Hilaire Rouelle discovers urea.
- Louis-Bernard Guyton de Morveau proposes the use of "muriatic acid gas" (hydrogen chloride) for fumigation of buildings.
- Antoine Baumé publishes his textbook Chymie expérimentale et raisonnée in Paris.

== Births ==
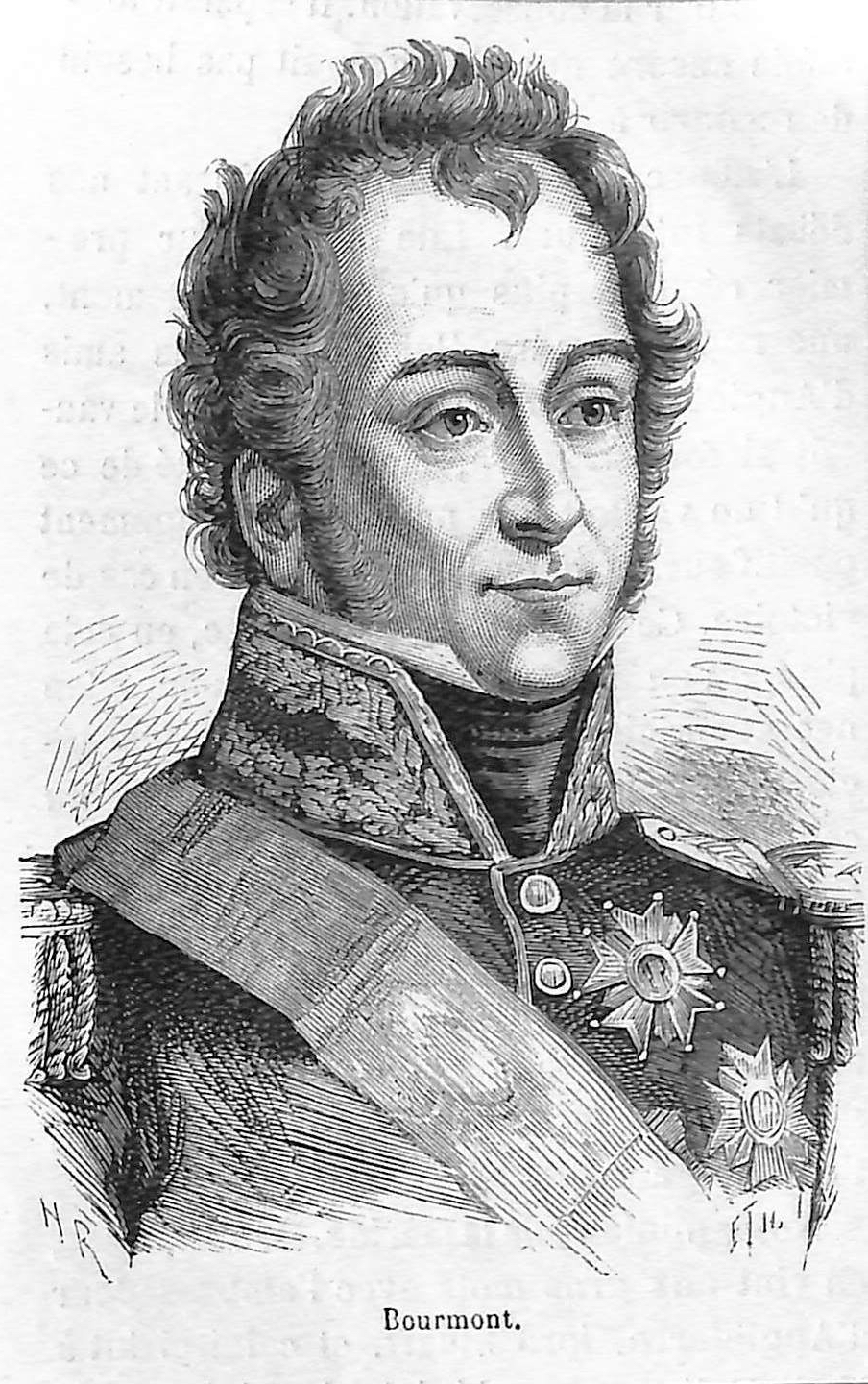
Louis-Auguste-Victor, Count de Ghaisnes de Bourmont

- 6 April – Nicolas Viton de Saint-Allais, genealogist (died 1842)
- 2 September – Louis-Auguste-Victor, Count de Ghaisnes de Bourmont, Marshal of France (died 1846)
- 6 September – François Fournier-Sarlovèze, military officer (died 1827)
- 14 September – Charles Lefebvre-Desnouettes, military officer (died 1822 at sea)
- 6 October – Louis Philippe I "Citizen King" of the French (died 1850)
- 12 December – Robert Surcouf, privateer, businessman and slave-trader (died 1827)

== Deaths ==
- 24 January – Philippe Buache, geographer (died 1700)
- 14 March – Philibert Commerson, naturalist (born 1727)
- 30 October – Philippe de La Guêpière, architect (born c.1715)
- 7 November – Princess Anne Charlotte of Lorraine, Abbess of Mons (born 1714)

=== Full date unknown ===
- Maximin de Bompart, naval officer (born 1698)
