= Joan Claudi Peiròt =

French Occitan-language writer

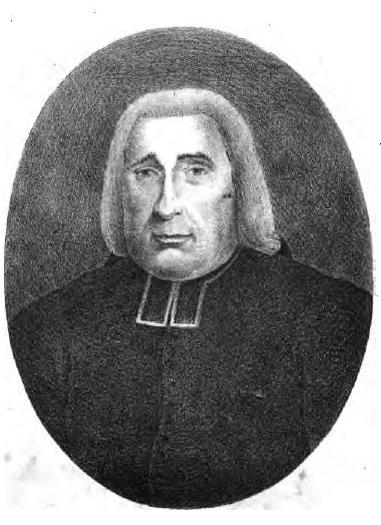

Joan Claudi Peiròt (in French Jean-Claude Peyrot, September 3, 1709 – April 3, 1795) was an Occitan-language writer from Millau in the province of Rouergue.

== Bibliography ==
- Poésies diverses, patoises et françaises. 1774.
- Les quatre Saisons. Villefranche-de-Rouergue, 1781
- Œuvres diverses. Villefranche-sur-Rouergue, 1788.
- Œuvres patoises et françaises, 3e édition, Millau, 1810.
- Œuvres patoises complètes, 4e édition, Millau, 1823.
- Œuvres patoises complètes, 5e édition, Millau, 1855.
- Œuvres patoises complètes, Millau, 1886.
- Les Quatre Saisons, Rodez, 1906.
- Poésies Rouergates & Françaises, Millau, 1909.
