= Charles-Félix de Galéan =

- Born: 1620; Avignon, Vaucluse, Provence-Alpes-Côte d'Azur, France
- Died: January 6, 1700 (aged 79–80); Châteauneuf-de-Gadagne, Vaucluse, Provence-Alpes-Côte d'Azur, France
- Occupation: Lieutenant-General
- Title: Duke
- Spouse: Jeanne de Gravé

Charles-Félix de Galéan (1620-1700) was a French aristocrat and Lieutenant-General. He was the first Duke of Châteauneuf-de-Gadagne.

== Early life ==
Charles-Félix de Galéan was born in 1620. On his paternal side, his family, who were from Genoa, settled near Avignon shortly circa 1350, at the time of the Black Death. His mother's maiden name was Guadagni.

== Career ==
At the age of fourteen, he served on the Île Sainte-Marguerite. Three years later, in 1637, he defeated the enemy Commander.

He served as Lieutenant-General under King Louis XIV (whose reign went from 1643 to 1715). He was an aide-de-camp to Henri de la Tour d'Auvergne, Vicomte de Turenne in 1652. He served as Commander in the Battle of Jijel in Jijel, Algeria in 1664.

He acquired Châteauneuf for 68,000 Écu from descendants of Giraud Amic de Sabran (1170-1215) in 1669. Later that year, Pope Clement IX made Châteauneuf a duchy. Drawing upon his mother's maiden name, it was renamed Châteauneuf-de-Gadagne. As a result, de Galéan became the Duke of Châteauneuf-de-Gadagne.

He served as Commander in the Siege of Negroponte of 1688. The following year, in 1689, King Louis XIV allowed him to become Generalissimo of the Republic of Venice.

== Personal life ==
He married Jeanne de Gravé. They had no issue.

== Death ==
He died on January 6, 1700, in Gadagne.

== Legacy ==
His title was passed on to his widow's nephew, Louis-Achilles de Galéan, Marquess of Nerestang and Vedène in 1718. After he died in 1733, it was passed on to Pierre-François de Galéan, Duke of Gadagne, Marquess of Vedène.
