= Les deux avares =

1770 opera by André Grétry

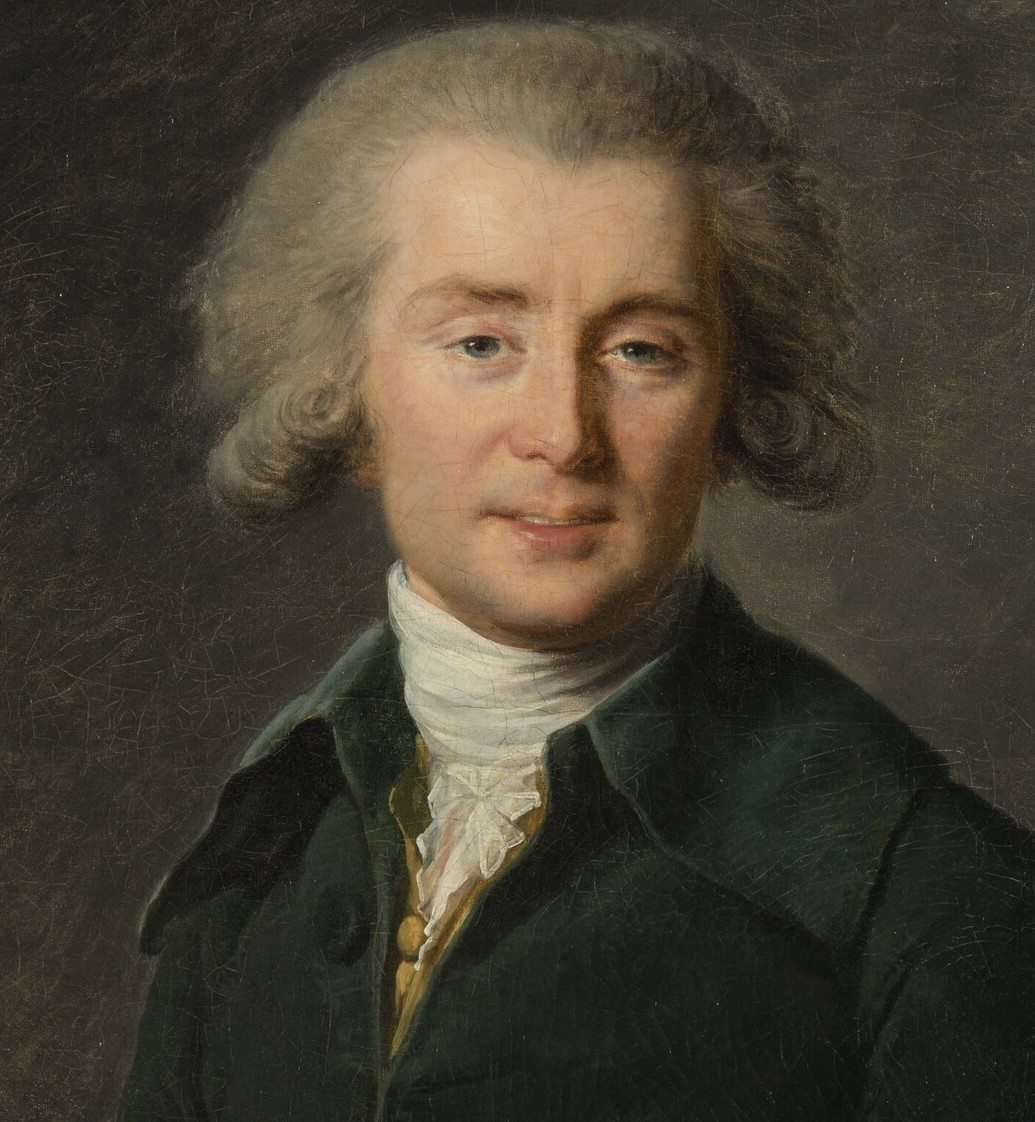
André Grétry

Les deux avares (French pronunciation: [le døz‿avaʁ]; "The Two Misers") is an opéra bouffon in two acts written by André Grétry at age 27 in 1770 to a French libretto by Fenouillot de Falbaire and German version by Herbert Trantow.

== Performance history ==
It was first performed at Fontainebleau on 27 October 1770.

== Roles ==
Role	Voice type	Premiere Cast, October 27, 1770 (Conductor: - )
Henriette, Gripon’s niece	soprano	
Madelon, Gripon’s housekeeper	mezzo-soprano	
Gripon, a dodgy banker	tenor	
Martin, speculator	baritone	
Jérôme, Martin’s clerk	tenor	
Ali, Captain of the Janissaries	bass	
Mustapha	tenor	
Osman, second commander	Non-singing role	
A messenger	Non-singing role	
The Janissaries		

== Synopsis ==
Place: A public square in Smyrna
Time: 18th century

Martin, a speculator, and Gripon, a dodgy banker, are two greedy villains who collaborate to find treasure in the pyramid in Smyrna. When Martin tells Gripon that there are no treasures in the pyramid, he doesn't believe him and thinks Martin tried to cheat him. He leaves Martin locked in the pyramid. Jérôme and Henriette fall in love with each other but the only way out for their love is to escape from both Martin and Gripon. However, they are delayed by various misfortunes. Gripon later finds out that he has been cheated and it is he of all people who conclude that there is no honesty in the world any more.
