= Joseph Labrosse (Carmelite) =

Catholic missionary and writer (1636–1697)

- Père Ange de Saint Joseph
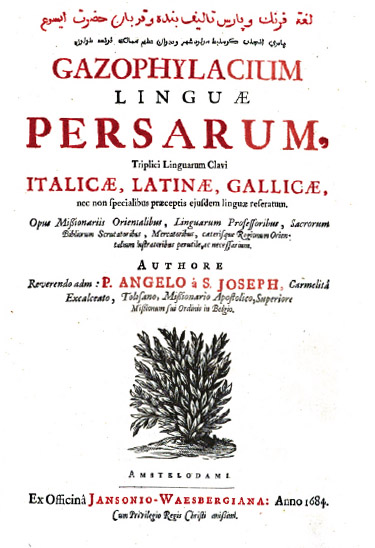
- Manuscript of Labrosse's Gazophylacium linguae persarum, Amsterdam, 1684

Personal life
- Born: 1636 Toulouse, Kingdom of France
- Died: 1697 (aged 60–61)
- Notable work(s): Pharmacopoea Persica; Gazophylacium linguae persarum
- Known for: Transmitting Persian medical terminology to Europe; First European to make a serious study of Iranian medicine Quadrilingual Persian-Latin-French-Italian dictionary
- Other name: Father Angelus of St. Joseph

Religious life
- Denomination: Catholic Church
- Order: Discalced Carmelites

Joseph Labrosse, also known under his religious alias Father Angelus of St. Joseph (French: Père Ange de Saint Joseph; 1636–1697), was a French Carmelite missionary and writer. He played a role in transmitting Persian medical terminology to Europe, and was the first European to make a serious study of Iranian medicine. He also compiled a Persian dictionary with translations into Latin, French, and Italian.

== Biography ==
Born in Toulouse, Labrosse joined the Order of the Discalced Carmelites, and adopted the religious alias "Father Angelus of St. Joseph", which literally translates as "Angel of Saint Joseph". In 1662, he went to Rome where he stayed for roughly two years and studied Arabic. He then travelled to Isfahan, where he studied Persian. During his stay in Iran, from 1664 to 1678, Labrosse tried to use medicine to disseminate Christianity in the country. In the process, he read many Persian and Arabic books on medicine, and he reportedly interacted with the learned people of Isfahan. He also reportedly paid many visits to the shops of the Isfahani druggists, pharmacists and chemists. In 1678, following his return to France, he published his Pharmacopoea Persica. This work consists of a Latin translation of the Tibb-i shifā'i, a 16th-century Persian work on composite remedies written by Muzaffar ibn Muhammad al-Husayni (died 1556), as well as supplementary commentary by Labrosse himself.

In 1684, while in the Netherlands, Labrosse published his Gazophylacium linguae persarum. This work is a Persian dictionary with Italian, Latin and French definitions, that pays special attention to medicine and medicinal substances. In Safavid Persia: The History and Politics of an Islamic Society, the work is referred to as a "veritable encyclopaedia of Iran, including a few transcriptions that indicate the colloquial pronunciation of the time".

As far as eastern languages are concerned; in addition to Arabic and Persian, Labrosse was proficient in Turkish.
