= 1694 in France =

- Decades: 1670s; 1680s; 1690s; 1700s; 1710s
- See also: History of France; Timeline of French history; List of years in France

Events from the year 1694 in France.

== Incumbents ==
- Monarch – Louis XIV

== Events ==
- 27 May – Battle of Torroella
- 29 June – Battle of Texel

== Births ==
- 21 November – Voltaire, writer, historian, and philosopher (died 1778)

=== Full date unknown ===
- Louis, Duke of Joyeuse, nobleman (died 1724)

== Deaths ==
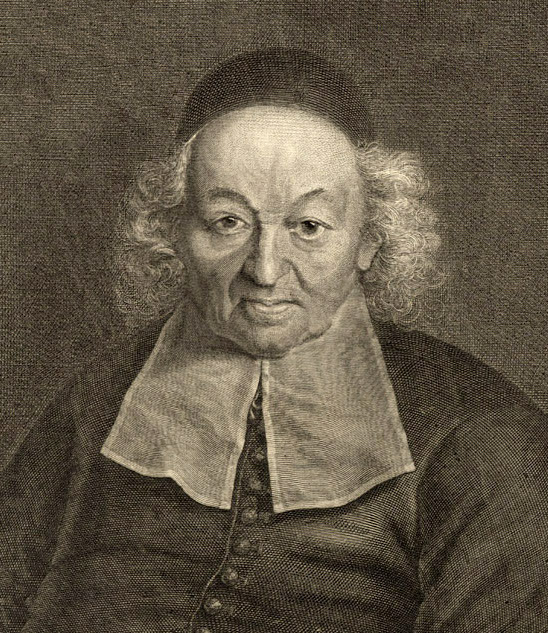
Ismaël Bullialdus

- 16 April – Claire-Clémence de Maillé-Brézé, noblewoman (born 1628)
- 28 September – Gabriel Mouton, scientist (born 1618)
- 25 November – Ismaël Bullialdus, astronomer and mathematician (born 1605)
- 4 December – Bernardin Gigault de Bellefonds, general (born 1630)

=== Full date unknown ===
- Paul Fréart de Chantelou, collector (born 1609)
- René Ouvrard, composer (born 1624)
