= 1619 in France =

- Decades: 1590s; 1600s; 1610s; 1620s; 1630s
- See also: History of France; Timeline of French history; List of years in France

Events from the year 1619 in France.

== Incumbents ==
- Monarch – Louis XIII

== Events ==
- 10 August – Treaty of Angoulême

== Births ==
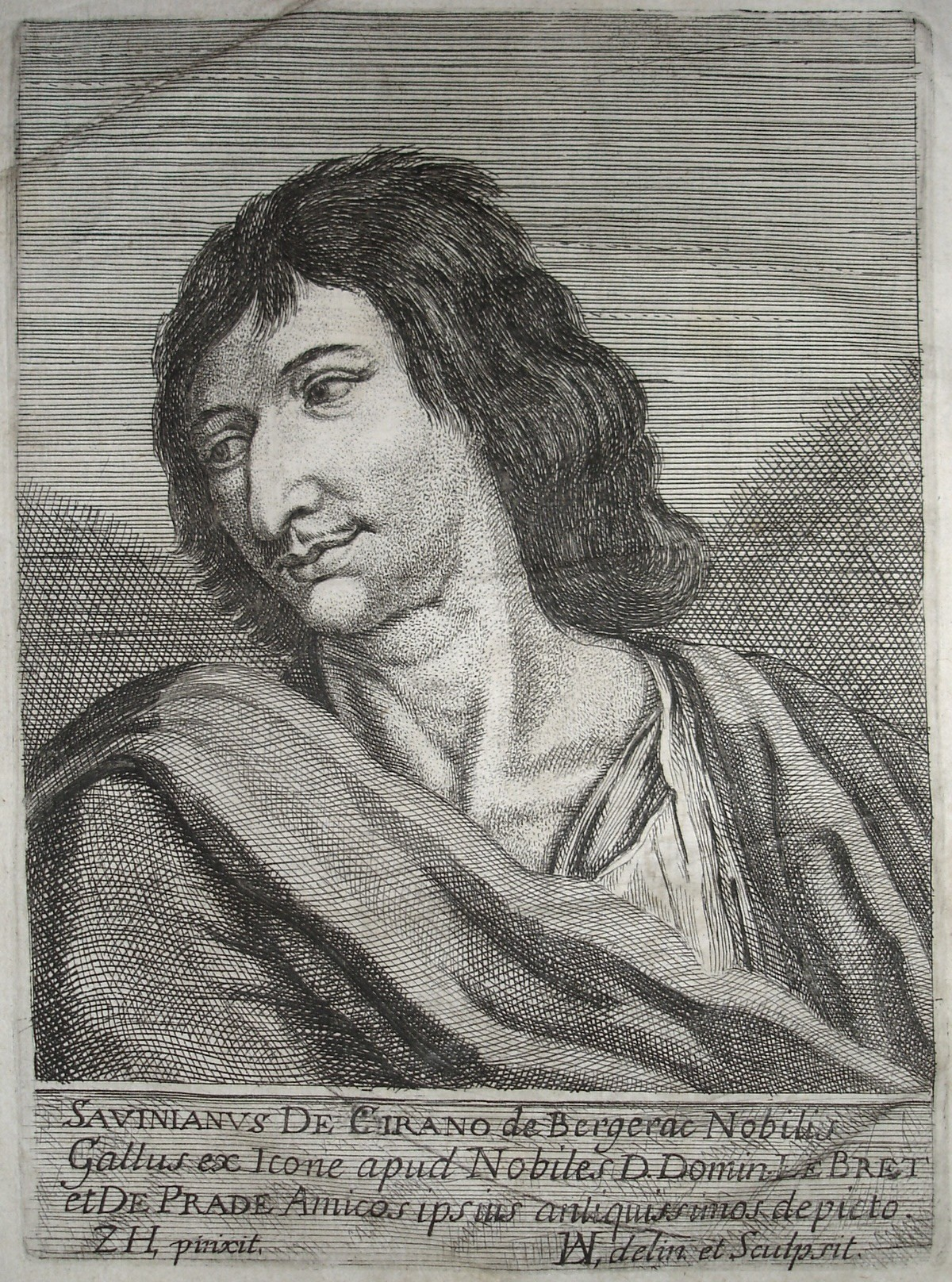
Cyrano de Bergerac

- Paul Hay du Chastelet Jr., military strategist and author (died ca. 1682)
- 6 March – Cyrano de Bergerac, novelist and playwright, (died 1655)
- 28 December – Antoine Furetière, scholar and writer (died 1688)

== Deaths ==
- 12 February – Pierre de Larivey, dramatist (born 1549)
- 18 June – Martin Fréminet, painter (born 1567)

=== Full date missing ===
- François d'Amboise, jurist and writer (born 1550)
- Jacques Margeret, mercenary captain (born c.1565)
- Olivier de Serres, author and soil scientist (born 1539)
- François Quesnel, painter (born c.1543)
