= 1626 in France =

- Decades: 1600s; 1610s; 1620s; 1630s; 1640s
- See also: History of France; Timeline of French history; List of years in France

Events of the year 1626 in France.

== Incumbents ==
- Monarch: Louis XIII

== Events ==
- February: Peace of Paris: The Huguenots agree to leave the islands of Olèron and Ré they've occupied since 1625 in exchange for keeping their fortified towns and the right to continue their worship.
- May: Treaty of Monzon: The French and their allies, the Grisons, gain overlordship over the Val Tellina pass, an important pass through the Alps they've been fighting for with the Spaniards and the Papal troops for roughly a year
- May-19 August: Chalais conspiracy: A group of illustrious nobles, including Marie de Rohan-Montbazon, Duchess of Chevreuse; Henri de Talleyrand-Périgord, comte de Chalais, First Gentleman of the Chamber and César de Bourbon, Duke of Vendôme, Governor of Brittany, with Gaston, Duke of Orléans and his governor Jean-Baptiste d'Ornano as the instigators, are plotting against the king and Cardinal Richelieu.
- 5 August: Gaston, Duke of Orléans marries Marie de Bourbon, Duchess of Montpensier

== Births ==
- Madame de Sévigné (died 1696)

== Deaths ==
- July: Jean-Baptiste d'Ornano dies in prison as a result of kidney and bladder ailments after having been arrested for taking part in the Chalais conspiracy
- 19 August: Henri de Talleyrand-Périgord, comte de Chalais is executed at Nantes as the (proclaimed) main instigator of the Chalais conspiracy
