= Paul Hay du Chastelet Jr. =

Paul Hay du Chastelet Jr. (born 1619, died ca. 1682) was a military strategist and author known for writing the Traite de guerre, ou Politique militaire and the son of Paul Hay du Chastelet (1592–1636), who he is often confused with, and the nephew of Daniel Hay du Chastelet (1596–1671), a priest and mathematician.

== Biography ==
Little is known about Du Chastelet's life, but a basic outline can be given. He was baptised in Rennes on 30 May 1619, and received schooling at his uncle Daniel's home. By 1646, he had married Geneviève-Élizabeth Bonneau; the ceremony was held at La Perrière; his uncle presided. Despite burning his uncle's theological writings, Du Chastelet became a fervent Catholic; he believed that the Huguenots needed to be expelled from France, and his work frequently invoked God, and implored rulers to fight for a good cause and spare non-combatants; in his most famous work, he claimed to have learnt from battles he was involved in, which has been speculated to refer to the Fronde. His date of death is unknown, with some claiming that he died as early as 1670, only a short while after the 1668 publication of his Traite de guerre, ou Politique militaire, but a more plausible estimate of his death is 1682. The Traite de guerre is notable for distinguishing between offensive and defensive warfare and for being compiled for Louis XIV of France. He is considered to be one of only two major strategists in Europe in the middle of the 17th century; the other being Raimondo Montecuccoli.
