= 1621 in France =

- Decades: 1600s; 1610s; 1620s; 1630s; 1640s
- See also: History of France; Timeline of French history; List of years in France

Events from the year 1621 in France.

== Incumbents ==
- Monarch: Louis XIII

== Events ==
- April 26 – Treaty of Madrid signed by courtier François de Bassompierre: Valtelline restored to the Grisons and Spain allowed to reoccupy Chiavenna.
- May – Huguenot rebellions: Capture of Saumur by Louis XIII.
- May 30 – June 24 – Huguenot rebellions: Siege of Saint-Jean-d'Angély – Royal victory.
- June – Huguenot rebellions: Blockade of La Rochelle begins.
- August – Huguenot rebellions: Siege of Montauban – Louis XIII besieges the Huguenot city of Montauban but is forced to abandon his siege two months later.
- Benedictine Congregation of Saint Maur established.

== Births ==
- July 8 – Jean de La Fontaine, fabulist (died 1695)
- August 13 – Israel Silvestre, topographical etcher (died 1691)
- September 8 – Louis, Grand Condé, general (died 1686)
- October 3 – Claude Maltret, Jesuit (died 1674)
- October 16 – Pierre Paul Puget, painter, sculptor, architect and engineer (died 1694)
- October 21 – Nicholas Barré, French Minim friar, priest and founder (died 1686)
- Françoise Bertaut de Motteville, memoirist (died 1689)
- Jacques Courtois, painter (died 1676)

== Deaths ==
- June 2 – Dorothea of Lorraine (born 1545)
- June 8 – Anne de Xainctonge, religious (born 1567)
- August 3 – Guillaume du Vair, author and lawyer (born 1556)
- September 20 – Henry of Lorraine, Duke of Mayenne, noble (born 1578)
- c. October 8 – Antoine de Montchrestien, dramatist, economist and adventurer (born c.1575)
- October 21 – Paul Phélypeaux de Pontchartrain, French politician (born 1569)
- December 15 – Charles d'Albert, duc de Luynes, Constable of France (born 1578)
- Louis de Caullery, painter (born 1555)
- François Pithou, author and lawyer (born 1543)
