= 1622 in France =

- Decades: 1600s; 1610s; 1620s; 1630s; 1640s
- See also: History of France; Timeline of French history; List of years in France

Events from the year 1622 in France.

== Incumbents ==
- Monarch: Louis XIII

== Events ==
- April 16 – Huguenot rebellions: Blockade of La Rochelle ends in royal victory.
- May – Huguenot rebellions: siege of Royan – The Huguenot city of Royan is taken by royal forces after a 6-day siege.
- June 11 – Huguenot rebellions: siege of Nègrepelisse – The Huguenot city of Nègrepelisse is taken by royal forces after a short siege by royal forces; the entire population is subsequently massacred and the city burned to the ground.
- July 22 – Huguenot rebellions: siege of Montpellier begins.
- October 18 – Treaty of Montpellier signed, ending the siege of Montpellier and the first of the Huguenot rebellions.
- October 27 – Huguenot rebellions: The inconclusive Naval battle of Saint-Martin-de-Ré is fought between the Huguenot fleet of La Rochelle, commanded by Jean Guiton, and a royal fleet under the command of Charles, Duke of Guise.
- Compagnie Ordinaire de la Mer established by Cardinal Richelieu.
- Musketeers of the Guard established.
- "Rosicrucianism furor" breaks out in Paris.

== Births ==
- January 15 (bapt.) – Molière, born Jean-Baptiste Poquelin, playwright (died 1673)
- January 28 – Adrien Auzout, astronomer (died 1691)
- February 18 – Thomas Regnaudin, sculptor (died 1706)
- May 9 – Jean Pecquet, anatomist (died 1674)
- May 22 – Louis de Buade de Frontenac, Governor of New France (died 1698)
- June 6 – Claude-Jean Allouez, Jesuit missionary and explorer of North America (died 1689)
- September 22 – Jacques Savary, merchant and economist (died 1690)

== Deaths ==
- January 9 – Alix Le Clerc, canoness regular, foundress and blessed (born 1576)
- April 14 – Antoine de Gaudier, Jesuit theologian (born 1572)
- September 7 – Denis Godefroy, lawyer (born 1549)
- September 14 – Alof de Wignacourt, 54th Grandmaster of the Knights Hospitaller (born 1547)
- November 17 – Pierre Biard, settler, Jesuit missionary (born 1567)
- December 28 – Francis de Sales, Catholic Bishop of Geneva (born 1567 in the Duchy of Savoy)
- Dominique Barrière, painter and engraver (died 1678)
