= 1627 in France =

- Decades: 1600s; 1610s; 1620s; 1630s; 1640s
- See also: History of France; Timeline of French history; List of years in France

Events from the year 1627 in France.

== Incumbents ==
- Monarch – Louis XIII

== Events ==
- Anglo-French War (1627–1629)
- Siege of Saint-Martin-de-Ré
- Siege of La Rochelle

== Births ==
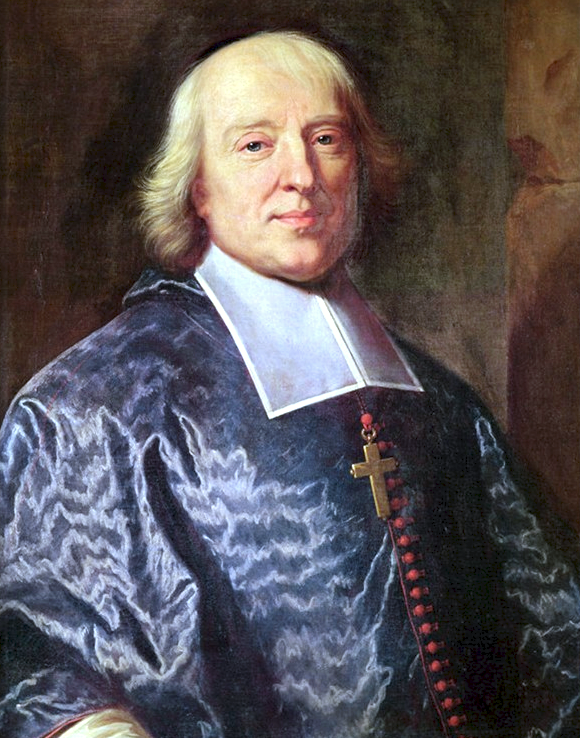
Jacques-Bénigne Bossuet

- 27 September – Jacques-Bénigne Bossuet, bishop (died 1704)

=== Full date missing ===
- Hector d'Andigné de Grandfontaine, governor (died 1696)

== Deaths ==
=== Full date missing ===
- Jacques Mauduit, composer (born 1557)
- François Savary de Brèves, ambassador and orientalist (born 1560)
- Charles Loyseau, lawyer (born 1564)
- Marie Vernier, actress (born c.1590)
- Marie de Bourbon, Duchess of Montpensier, noblewoman (born 1605)
