= 1623 in France =

- Decades: 1600s; 1610s; 1620s; 1630s; 1640s
- See also: History of France; Timeline of French history; List of years in France

Events from the year 1623 in France.

== Incumbents ==
- Monarch: Louis XIII

== Events ==
- February – France, Savoy, and Venice sign the Treaty of Paris, agreeing to cooperate in removing Spanish forces from the strategic Alpine pass of Valtelline.

== Births ==
- 30 April – François de Laval, first bishop of New France (d. 1708)
- 19 June – Blaise Pascal, French mathematician, physicist, and philosopher (d. 1662)

== Deaths ==
- 25 March – Henri de La Tour d'Auvergne, vicomte de Turenne, duc de Bouillon (b. 1555)
