= 1631 in France =

- Decades: 1610s; 1620s; 1630s; 1640s; 1650s
- See also: History of France; Timeline of French history; List of years in France

Events from the year 1631 in France.

== Incumbents ==
- Monarch – Louis XIII

== Events ==
- 23 January – Thirty Years' War: France and Sweden sign the Treaty of Bärwalde, a military alliance in which France provides funds for Gustavus Adolphus of Sweden to maintain an army campaign against northern Germany.
- 30 January – Gaston, Duke of Orléans, breaks with Cardinal Richelieu and leaves the court.
- 3–4 February – Riots in Paris against wine tax and a rise in the price of bread.
- 23 February – Marie de' Medici is exiled to Compiègne.
- 30 March – The king at Dijon accuses accomplices of Gaston of Orléans of lèse-majesté.
- 6 April – War of the Mantuan Succession is ended by the Treaty of Cherasco (confirmed 19 June) by which France renounces its conquests in Italy but in fact by secret agreement retains Pinerolo.
- 23 May – Procession in Nice seeking relief from plague.
- 30 May
  - Thirty Years' War: France and Bavaria sign the Treaty of Fontainebleau, forming a secret alliance; this is largely negated by autumn.
  - La Gazette, the first French newspaper, is founded by Théophraste Renaudot.
  - Gaston of Orléans issues at Nancy a manifesto against Richelieu.
- 14 June – The king at Saint-Germain-en-Laye establishes an extraordinary Chambre de justice to try crimes of counterfeit money.
- 4 July – 400 Piedmontais raise the garrison of the castle of Nice, which is almost destroyed.
- 18 July – Marie de' Medici leaves for the Low Countries.
- 5 August – Gaston of Orléans joins Marie de' Medici in Brussels.
- 1 September–10 October – National Synod of Charenton of the Protestant Reformed Church of France at Charenton-le-Pont.
- 4 September – Richelieu is granted the dignity of duc et pair. The following day, he is received by the Parlement of Paris.
- 16 September – The king names Richelieu as Governor of Brittany.
- Full date missing – Franco-Moroccan Treaty signed.

== Births ==
- 16 March – René Le Bossu, critic (died 1680)
- 28 May – Louis André, priest, missionary and translator (died 1715)
- 1 October
  - Toussaint de Forbin-Janson, Catholic cardinal and Bishop of Beauvais (died 1713)
  - Eugene Maximilian, Prince of Hornes (died 1709)
- 22 October – Gilles Boileau, translator (died 1669)
- 30 October – Pierre Beauchamp, choreographer, dancer and composer (died 1705)
- 24 December – Gabrielle Suchon, Catholic moral philosopher and feminist (died 1703)
- Full date missing – Germain Audran, engraver (died 1710)

== Deaths ==
- 26 October – Catherine de Parthenay, noblewoman and mathematician (born 1554)
- 29 November – Edmond Richer, theologian (born 1559)
