= 1625 in France =

- Decades: 1600s; 1610s; 1620s; 1630s; 1640s
- See also: History of France; Timeline of French history; List of years in France

Events from the year 1625 in France.

== Incumbents ==
- Monarch – Louis XIII

== Events ==
- January – Battle of Blavet
- September – Recovery of Ré island

== Births ==
- 20 August – Thomas Corneille, playwright (died 1709)

=== Full date missing ===
- Joseph de Montclar, cavalry general (died 1690)
- Gabriel Nicolas de la Reynie, police officer (died 1709)

== Deaths ==
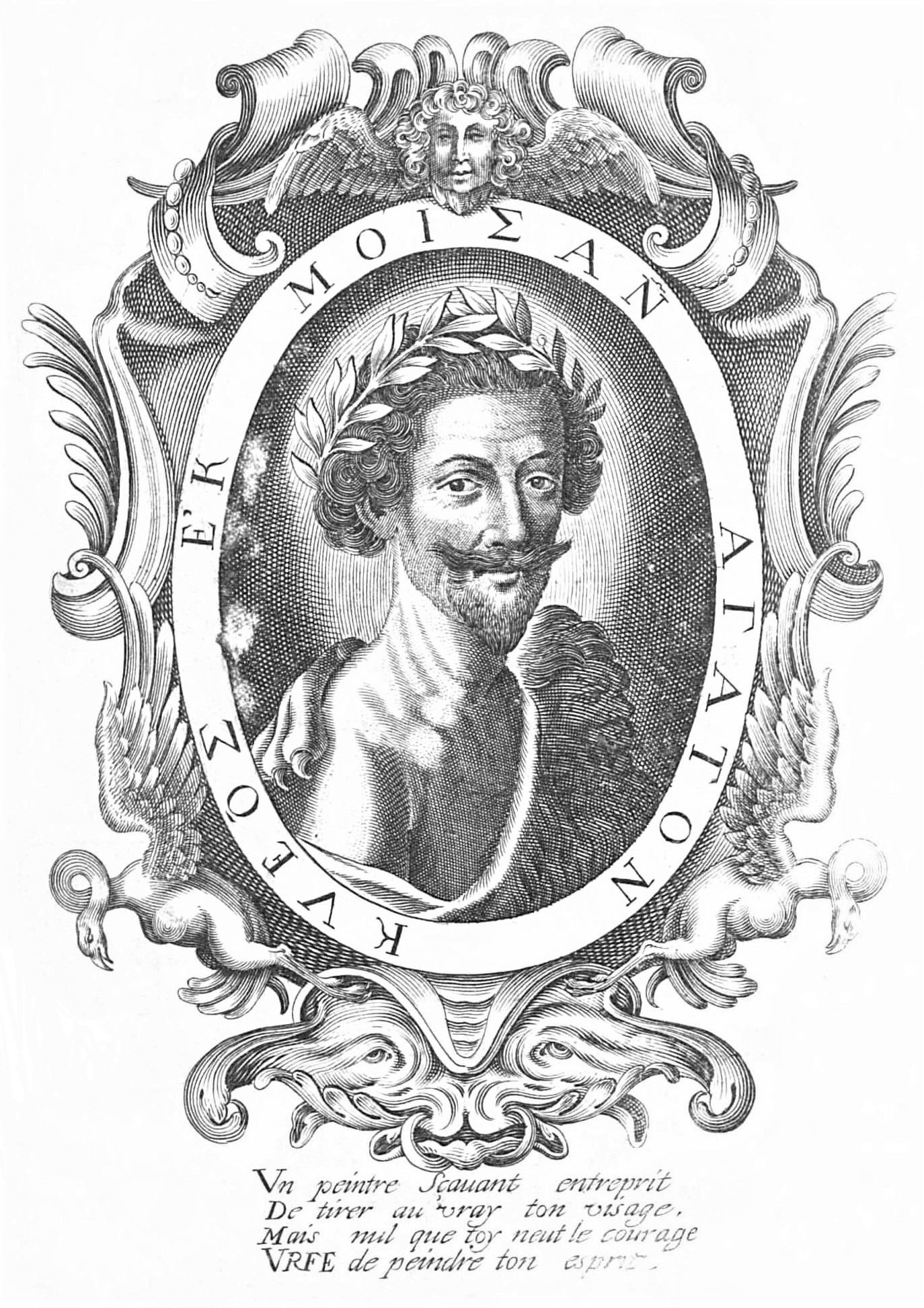
Honoré d'Urfé

- 1 June – Honoré d'Urfé, novelist (born 1568)

=== Full date missing ===
- Denis Jamet, priest
- Nicolas Viel, Recollect missionary
- Jacques Leschassier, jurist and magistrate (born 1550)
- César Oudin, Hispanist, translator, grammarian and lexicographer (born c.1560)
