= Germain Pilon =

French sculptor

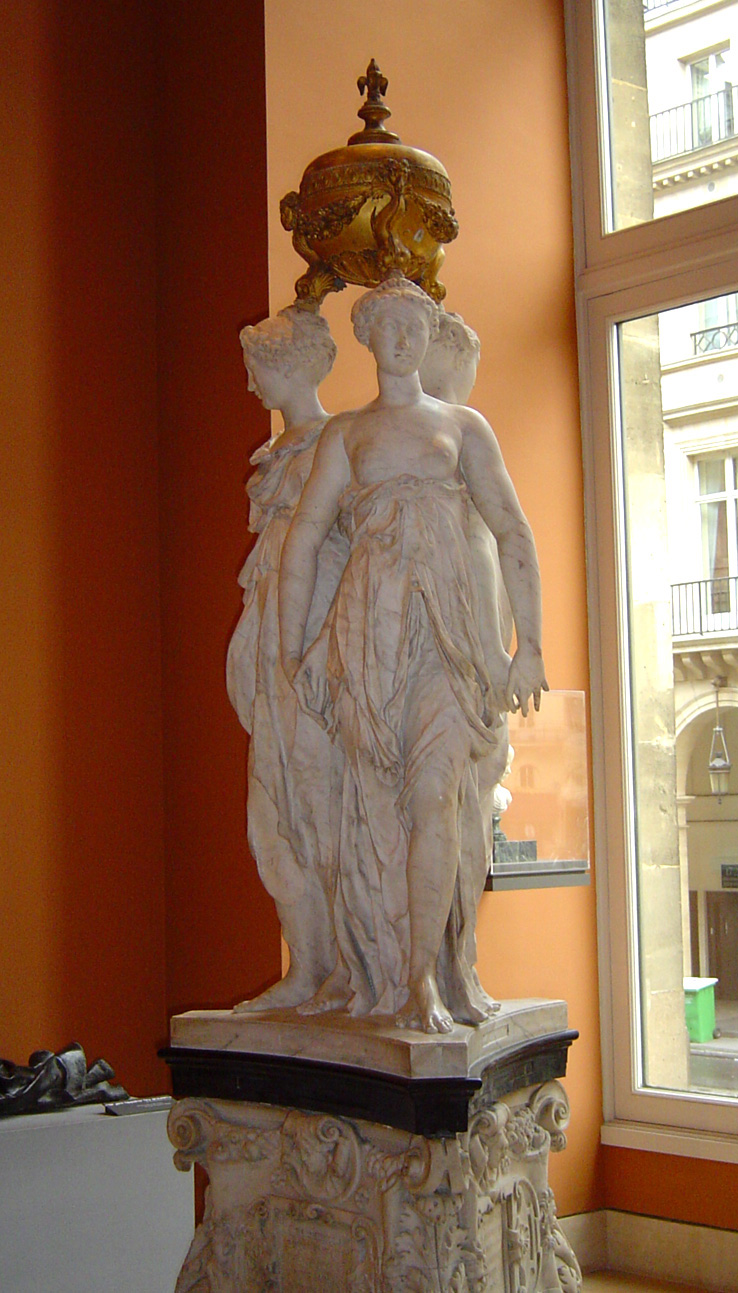
Monument containing the heart of Henry II of France.

Germain Pilon (French pronunciation: [ʒɛʁmɛ̃ pilɔ̃]; c. 1525 – 3 February 1590) was a French Renaissance sculptor.

He is, along with Jean Goujon, one of the most important sculptors of the French Renaissance. Best known as the creator of many of the tombs of the House of Valois.

== Biography ==
He was born in Paris and trained with his father, Andre Pilon. Documents show that he and his father executed several religious statues and tomb effigies in collaboration. Since Connat & Colombier established that Germain was born c. 1525 (rather than about ten years later, as previously believed), several early works have been reattributed to him, including the marble grouping Diana with a Stag (originally at the Château d'Anet, Eure-et-Loir; now at the Louvre). Later he worked with Pierre Bontemps. Pilon became expert with marble, bronze, wood and terra cotta. From about 1555 he was providing models for Parisian goldsmiths. He was also skilled at drawing.

His works - with their realism and theatrical emotion - show the influence of the School of Fontainebleau, Michelangelo and Italian Mannerism. Germain at first had an Italian influence. Much of Pilon's work was on funerary monuments, especially the Valois Chapel at the Saint Denis Basilica designed by Francesco Primaticcio (never completed). He was the favorite sculptor of Catherine de' Medici.

He was the son of Andre Pilon and Jeanne Becque. He was married twice, to Germaine Durand and Madeleine Beaudoux. He had 11 children: Jean, Raphaël, Germain Junior, Gervais, Claude, Jeanne, Lucrece, Charlotte, Suzanne, Anthoine, and Philippe.

== Works ==
Pilon's most famous works include:

- Eight subsidiary statues for the Tomb of Francis I (contracted with Philibert de l'Orme, 1558).
- Monument containing the heart of Henry II of France (1561–1562) Louvre - made in collaboration with Domenico del Barbieri (who designed the pedestal), Pilon was responsible for the eloquent sculpture of the Three Graces, executed from a single block of marble. The king's heart was placed in a bronze urn held by the Three Graces, but this urn was destroyed during the French Revolution and has been replicated.
- Tomb of Valentina Balbiani, a white marble tomb sculpture constructed between 1573 and 1574 for Jeanne Valentine Balbiani, the Italian wife of the French statesman René de Birague.
- Tomb of Henry II and Catherine de' Medici (1561–1573) Abbey Church of Saint Denis Basilica - Pilon was responsible for the kneeling bronze figures on top of this monument (depicting the king and queen alive and praying) the moving and realistic recumbent figures of the queen and king in death at the center and the four Virtues at the corners of the monument, the construction of which was supervised by Francesco Primaticcio (who sculpted the four corner figures). (Catherine de' Medici is reported to have fainted at the sight of these figures.)
- Effigies of Henry II and Catherine de' Medici in coronation dress (1583) Abbey Church of Saint Denis Basilica - this later pair lacks the emotional intensity of the previous work
- Resurrection of Christ and recumbent figures of the guardians of the tomb, reunited in 1933 at the Musée du Louvre.
- Virgin of Pity (c.1585) (terra cotta) Louvre
- Tomb of Valentine Balbiani (1574) Louvre
- Descent from the Cross (1580–1585) (Bronze bas-relief) Louvre
- Three Fates (Hôtel de Cluny, Paris).

== Gallery ==
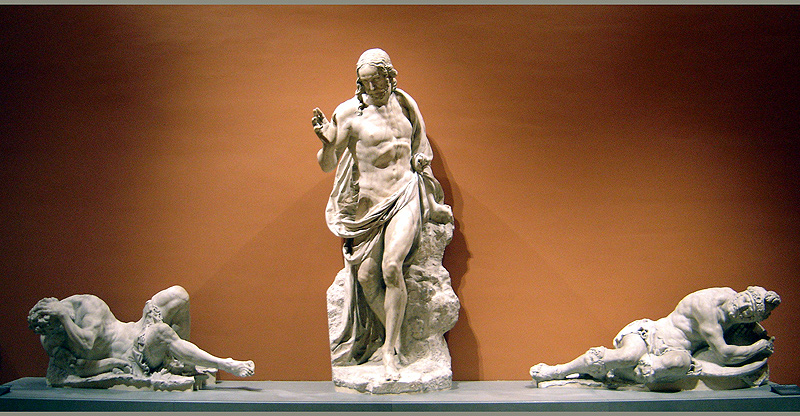
Resurrection of Christ, Louvre

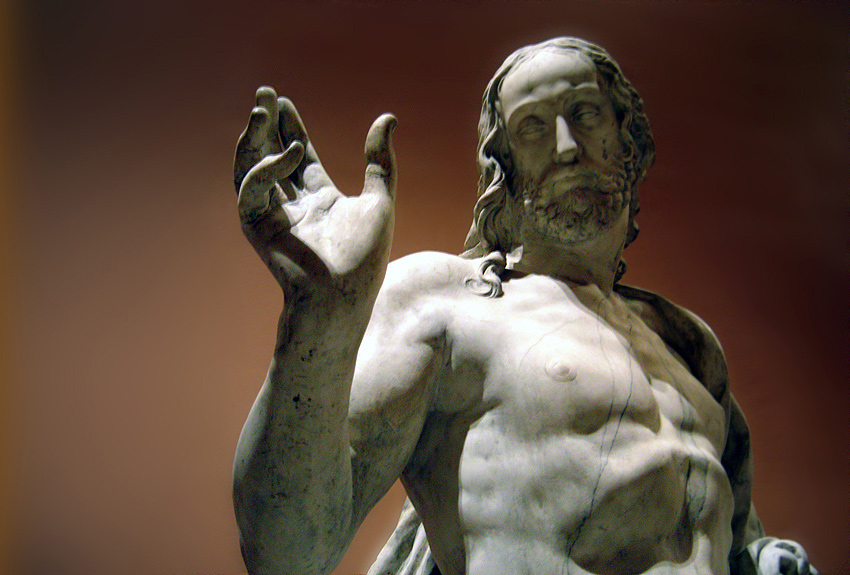
Resurrection of Christ (detail)

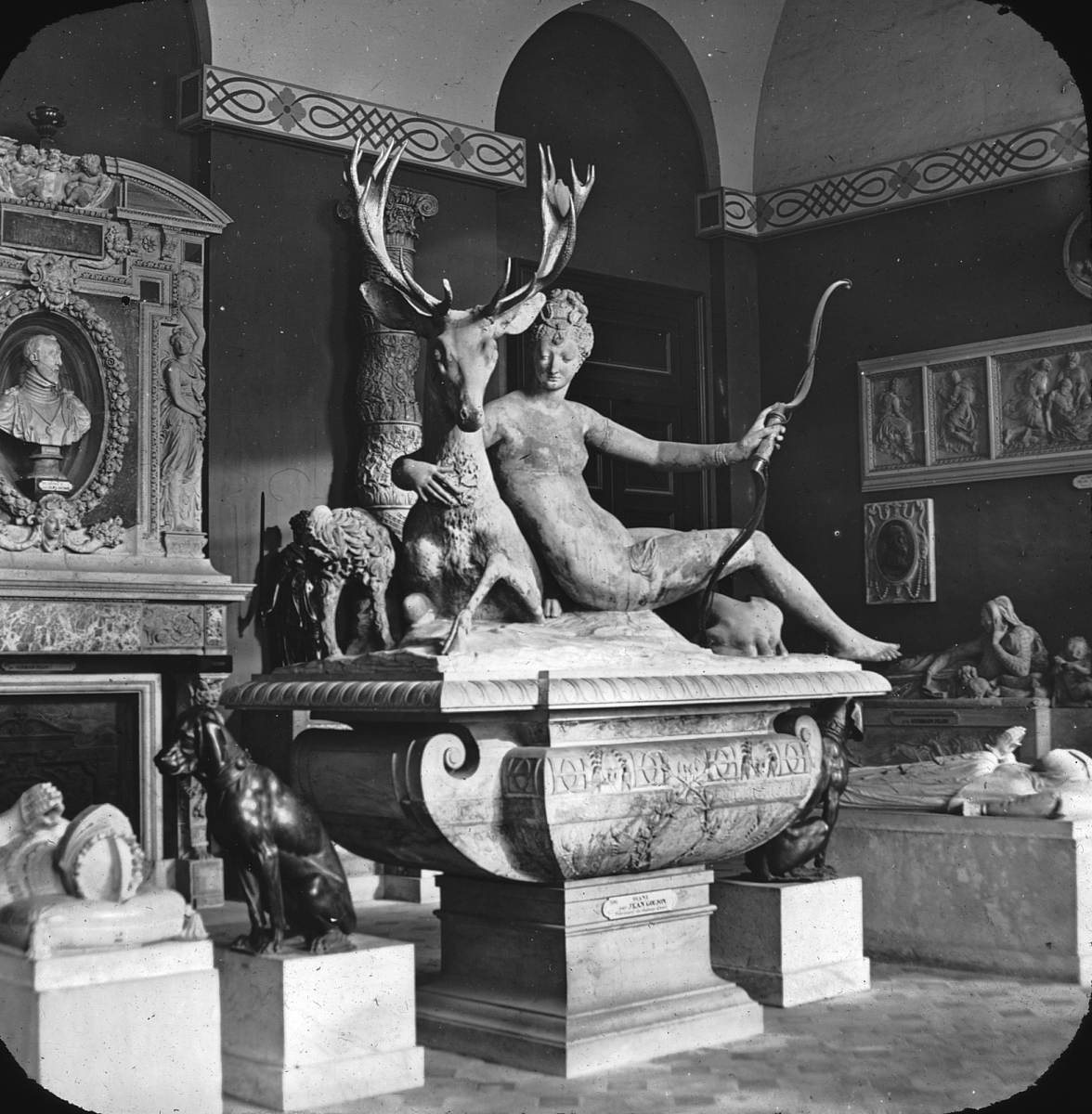
Diana with a Stag, Louvre
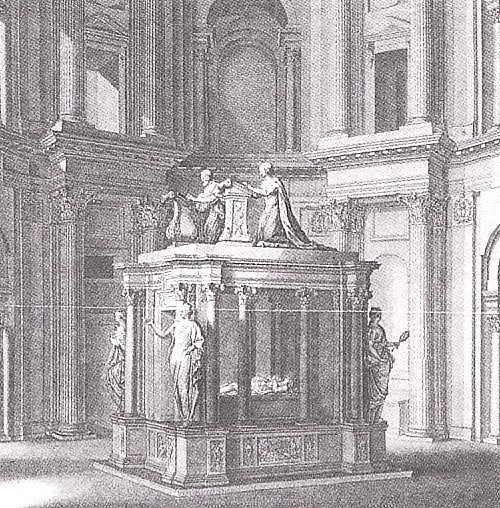
Drawing of how the tomb of Henry II and his wife originally looked; it shows the Effigies at top and the double tomb below

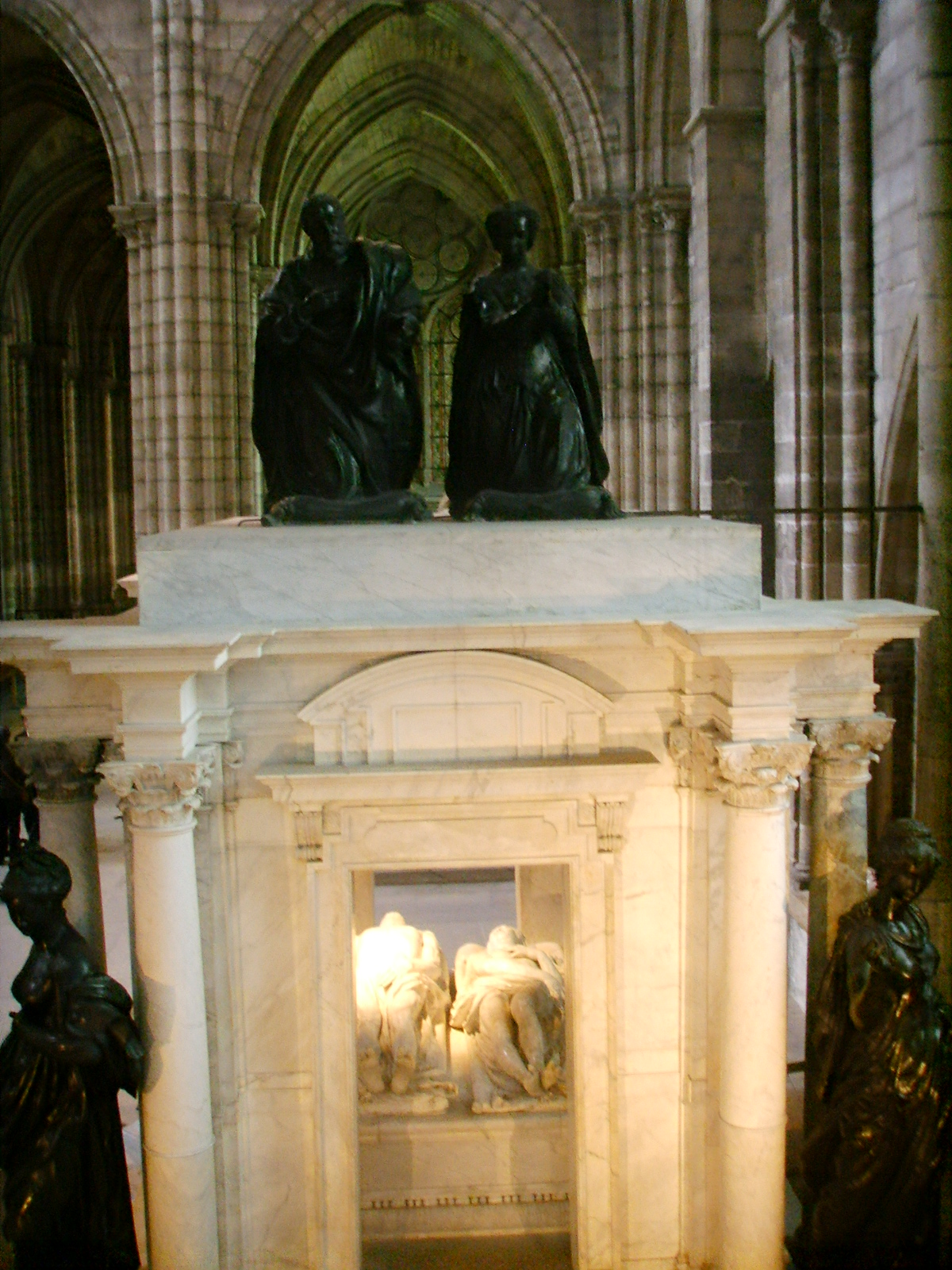
Tomb of Henry II and Catherine de' Medici, Saint-Denis Basilica, with marble effigies

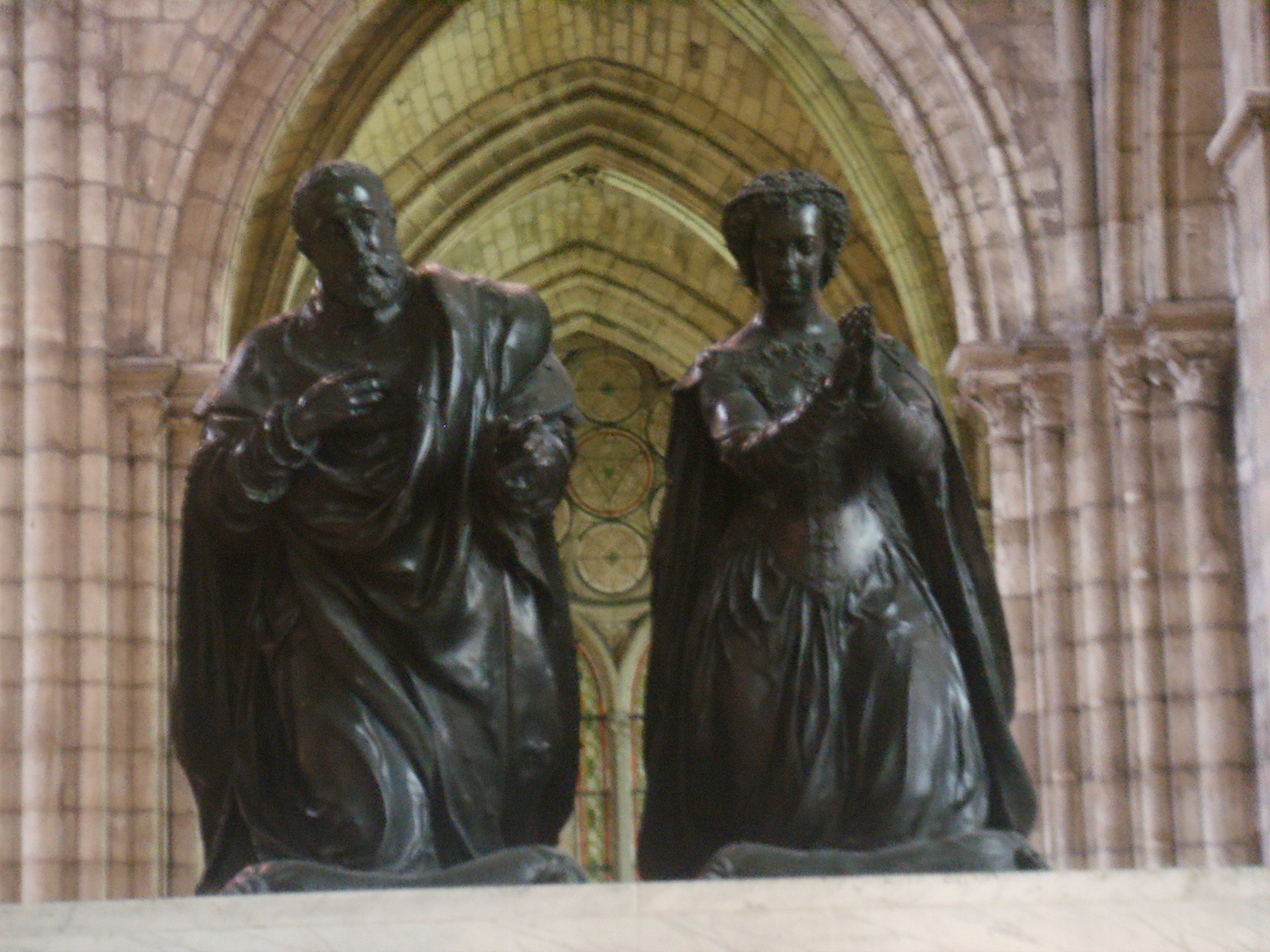
Saint-Denis Basilica, kneeling bronzes of Henry II and Catherine de' Medici on top of their tomb

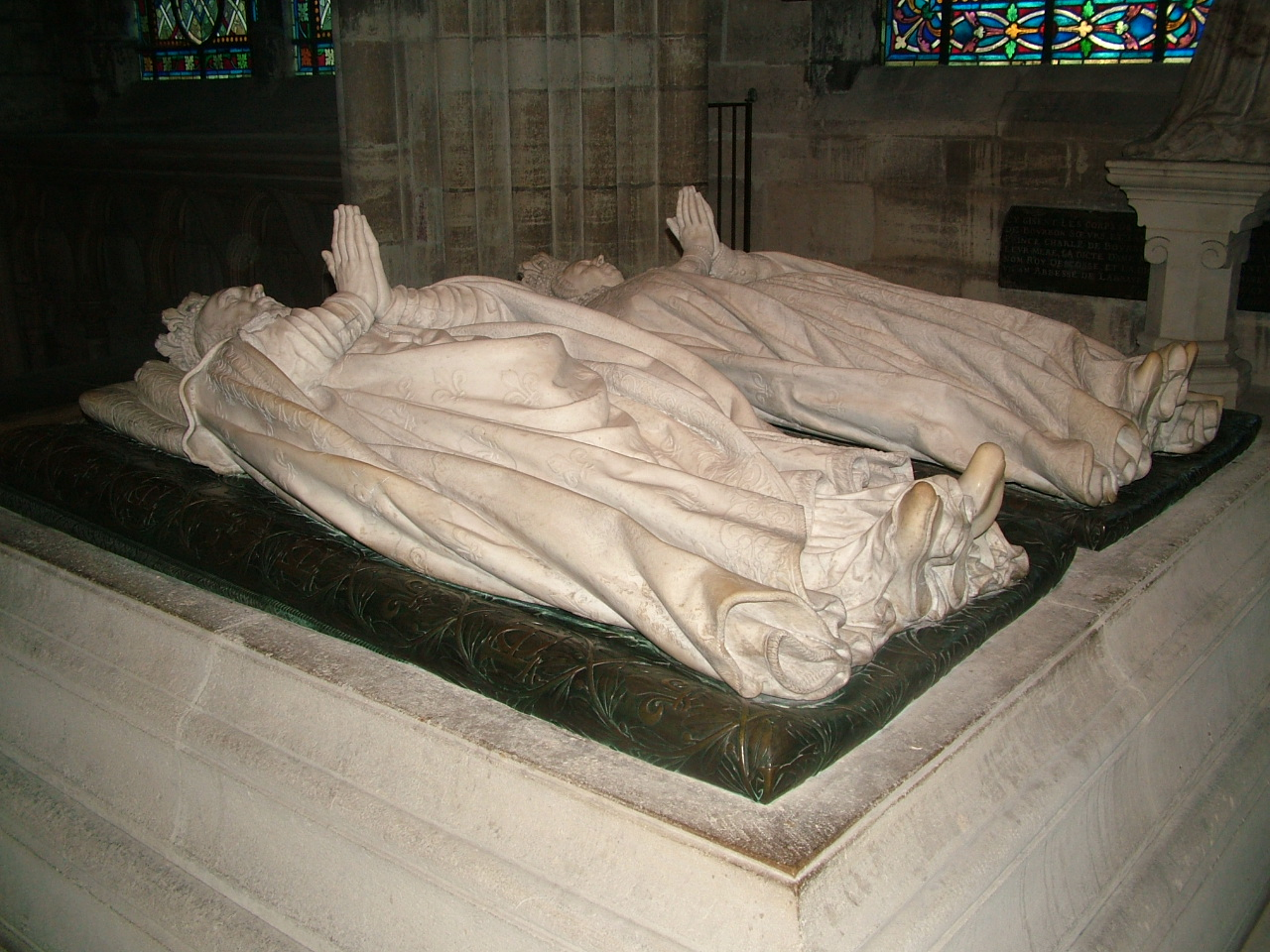
Saint-Denis Basilica, marble sculptures of Henry II and Catherine de' Medici in coronation robes

== See also ==
- Catherine de' Medici's building projects
- French art

== Bibliography ==
- Babelon, Jean (1927). Germain Pilon. Paris: Les Beaux-Arts, Edition d'etudes et de documents. OCLC 372675, 458567104.
- Blunt, Anthony; Beresford, Richard (1999). Art and Architecture in France, 1500–1700, 5th edition. New Haven, Connecticut: Yale University Press. ISBN 9780300077483.
- Cohen, Kathleen. Metamorphosis of a Death Symbol: The Transi Tomb in the Late Middle Ages and the Renaissance. Los Angeles: University of California Press, 1973. ISBN 978-0-5200-1844-0
- Connat, M.; Colombier, P. du (1951). "Quelques Documents commentés sur André et Germain Pilon", Bibliothèque d'Humanisme et Renaissance, vol. 13, pp. 196–204. JSTOR 20673562.
- Thirion, Jacques (1996). "Pilon, Germain", vol. 24, pp. 812–815, in The Dictionary of Art (34 volumes), edited by Jane Turner. New York: Grove. Also at Oxford Art Online (bibliography updated 2003, 2010; subscription required).
