= 1620 in France =

- Decades: 1600s; 1610s; 1620s; 1630s; 1640s
- See also: History of France; Timeline of French history; List of years in France

Events from the year 1620 in France.

== Incumbents ==
- Monarch: Louis XIII

== Events ==
- August 7 - Battle of Les Ponts-de-Cé, Poitou: French king Louis XIII defeats his mother Marie de' Medici.

== Births ==
- February 15 – François Charpentier, French archaeologist and man of letters (d. 1702)
- April 17 – Marguerite Bourgeoys, French Catholic nun, founder of the Congregation of Notre Dame (d. 1700)
- July 21 – Jean Picard, French astronomer and priest (d. 1704)
