= 1628 in France =

- Decades: 1600s; 1610s; 1620s; 1630s; 1640s
- See also: History of France; Timeline of French history; List of years in France

Events from the year 1628 in France.

== Incumbents ==
- Monarch – Louis XIII

== Events ==
- Siege of La Rochelle

== Births ==
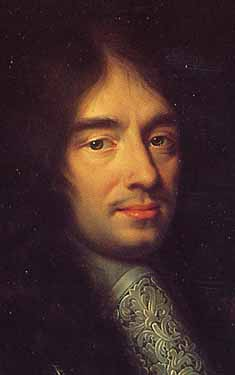
Charles Perrault

=== Full date missing ===
- Charles Perrault, writer (died 1703).
- Claire-Clémence de Maillé-Brézé, noblewoman (died 1694)
- François-Henri de Montmorency, duc de Luxembourg, general and marshal of France (died 1695)

== Deaths ==
- 16 October – François de Malherbe, poet, critic and translator (born 1555)

=== Full date missing ===
- Pierre Dugua, Sieur de Mons, merchant, explorer and colonizer (born c.1558)
- Simon Goulart, theologian, humanist and poet (born 1543)
- François de Sourdis, prelate, archbishop (born 1574)
- Nicolas des Escuteaux, novelist
