= 1629 in France =

- Decades: 1600s; 1610s; 1620s; 1630s; 1640s
- See also: History of France; Timeline of French history; List of years in France

Events from the year 1629 in France.

== Incumbents ==
- Monarch: Louis XIII

== Events ==
- 14 May–28 May – Huguenot rebellions: After a 15-day siege, Louis XIII captures Privas.
- 17 June – Huguenot rebellions: Alès surrenders after an intense siege. As a result, the leader of the Huguenot Rebellions, the Duke of Rohan, surrenders.
- 28 June – Huguenot rebellions: Louis XIII, King of France, signs in his camp at Lédignan the Peace of Alès, ending the Huguenot rebellions. The Huguenots are allowed religious freedom, but lose their political, territorial and military rights.
- 21 August – Huguenot rebellions: Montauban, one of the last Huguenot strongholds, surrenders without a fight to Richelieu's troops.

== Births ==
- 1 April – Jean-Henri d'Anglebert, French harpsichordist and composer (d. 1691)

== Deaths ==
- 2 October – Pierre de Bérulle, cardinal and statesman (b. 1575)
