= 1624 in France =

- Decades: 1600s; 1610s; 1620s; 1630s; 1640s
- See also: History of France; Timeline of French history; List of years in France

Events from the year 1624 in France.

== Incumbents ==
- Monarch: Louis XIII

== Events ==
- Winter – The Rhône and the vineyards of Languedoc freeze.
- 2 January – Disgrace of Nicolas Brûlart de Sillery and Pierre Brûlart, marquis de Sillery.
- 6 January – Étienne Ier d'Aligre becomes Keeper of the Seals of France.
- 29 April – Louis XIII appoints Cardinal Richelieu to the Conseil du Roi (Royal Council).
- May – Croquant rebellions in Quercy, suppressed on 7 June by Marshal de Thémines.
- 10 June – Treaty of Compiègne is signed between the Kingdom of France and the Dutch Republic.
- 13 August – Cardinal Richelieu is appointed by Louis XIII to be his chief minister, having intrigued against Charles de La Vieuville, Superintendent of Finances, arrested for corruption the previous day.
- 3 October – Étienne Ier d'Aligre becomes Grand Chancellor of France.
- 21 October – Edict of Saint-Germain-en-Laye establishes a Chamber of Justice for the investigation of financial abuse and embezzlement in government.
- 26 November – French troops under the Marquis de Ceuvre set out to occupy the forts of Valtellina.
- 6–10 December – Treaties with Venice and the Duke of Savoy over Valtellina.
- The Palace of Versailles is first built by Louis XIII, as a hunting lodge.
- The Parlement passes a decree forbidding criticism of Aristotle, on pain of death.
- Congregation of the Mission settles in the Collège des Bons Enfants in Paris.
- French colonial empire: Coastal trading settlements established in French Guiana and Senegal.

== Births ==
- 16 January – Pierre Lambert de la Motte, bishop (died 1679)
- 21 March – François Roberday, baroque organist and composer (died 1680)
- 31 March – Antoine Pagi, ecclesiastical historian (died 1699)
- 11 June – Jean-Baptiste du Hamel, cleric and natural philosopher (died 1706)
- 22 August – Jean Regnault de Segrais, poet and novelist born (died 1701)
- 25 August – François de la Chaise, churchman (died 1709)
- 30 October – Paul Pellisson, historian (died 1693)
- 3 November – Jean II d'Estrées, noble (died 1707)
- 28 November – Angélique de Saint-Jean Arnauld d'Andilly, Jansenist nun (died 1684)

Unknown date

- Louise de Prie, royal governess (died 1709)
- 1624 or 1625 – Gaspard Marsy, sculptor (died 1681)
- Gabriel Vendages de Malapeire, French aristocrat, parliamentarian and poet (died 1702)

== Deaths ==
- 31 July – Henry II, Duke of Lorraine, "the Good" (born 1563)
- 25 September – Fronton du Duc, Jesuit theologian (born 1558)
