= Charlotte Duplessis-Mornay =

French writer

Charlotte Duplessis-Mornay (née Arbaleste de la Borde; February 1, 1550 – May 15, 1606) was a French writer of the Reformation, known for her first-person account of the St. Bartholomew's Day massacre (1572) and for authoring the Memoires de Messire Philippes de Mornay, about her husband, Philippe de Mornay.

== Family ==
Born Charlotte Arbaleste, in Paris, France, on February 1, 1550, she had three brothers and a sister. Her father was Guy Arbaleste II, Viscount of Melun, Lord of la Borde in 1552. In 1555 he became president of the Paris Chamber of Accounts. He joined the Protestant religion in 1569 and died the following year. Charlotte's mother was a devout Catholic until the day she died in 1590.

== Life ==
She was born into a well-to-do French family many years before the civil war between the French Catholics and Protestants. During the religious wars in France, her father left the Catholic Church for the Protestant Church, while her mother remained a devout Catholic. Her siblings were divided between Catholic and Protestant, but Charlotte herself left the Catholic Church and remained a devout Protestant. At the age of 17, Charlotte married her first husband, Jean de Pas, the lord of Feuqueres. Jean de Pas was also a converted Protestant, but he had served at the court of Catholic Valois kings in the past. Once they were married, Charlotte was sent by her husband to Sedan, where their daughter was born. Jean died five months later, never meeting his daughter.

Charlotte became a Huguenot as an adult and was known for writing a first-person account of the St. Bartholomew's Day massacre (1572). After being caught up in the massacre she left her daughter in the custody of her Catholic mother and fled to Sedan for safety. In 1576, after she gained notoriety for writing those accounts, she met Philippe de Mornay (1549-1623), a writer who would later become her second husband.

== Marriage to Mornay ==
The widowed Charlotte did not wish to remarry, but she met and was attracted to the intelligence of Philippe de Mornay, lord of Plessis-Marly, a Huguenot fighter in the religious wars of the Protestant Reformation and a leading French Protestant. In 1576, at age 26, with an eight-year-old daughter from her first marriage, she married Philippe (age 27), who was also a writer and who had escaped the St. Bartholomew massacre as well. He continued to be a soldier but soon became adviser to then-Huguenot King Henry of Navarre, who wanted the French throne. Philippe was a well-respected soldier and author and was called the Pope of the Huguenots. In marrying Philippe de Mornay, Charlotte’s life course changed dramatically; she was now set on traveling with her husband as much as she could. She desired to enable her husband the freedom to write.

She moved her family to London, Flanders, Gascony and Saumur as her husband moved. During their travels, Charlotte and Philippe befriended many prominent Protestants such as Francis Walsingham, Mary Sidney and Philip Sidney. Charlotte and Philippe had eight children together; however, only three lived past infancy. While her husband was building his career she aided him by entertaining people who came to see him: military men, courtiers, and other writers. She dedicated her life to Philippe; as a fellow Huguenot she decided it was her duty to ensure he had the time to write and convert people to become involved in the Huguenot cause.

== Work ==
Charlotte Duplessis-Mornay first gained notoriety as a writer when she wrote a first-person account of the St. Bartholomew’s Day massacre. Charlotte was an avid letter writer but was best known for the Memories de Messier de Philippe de Mornay, which she wrote for her husband. The Memories de Messier de Philippe de Mornay were first published in 1624 and are now in the Sorbonne Library. She began writing the memoir in 1584, and in 1595, she gave the writing that she had so far written to her 16-year-old son because it was her wish that he would carry on the work and alliances of the Protestant cause, a cause that his mother and father began. With failing health and vision she continued to write the memoir for ten years.

During that time, she kept a record of all of her husband's writings, declarations, and political activities. When she received the tragic news of the death of her son Philippe, who was killed fighting with the army of Prince Maurice at Gueldres on October 23, 1605, Charlotte gave up her Memoires, which she had been writing for him alone. She put down her pen on April 21, 1606.

== Death ==
Charlotte Duplessis-Mornay died in 1606, one year after the death of her only son, after a long period of illness, exhaustion, sorrow, and near blindness. She died on May 15, 1606, of the same year she quit writing. Not long after her husband’s death, in 1623, Memoires de Messier Philippe de Mornay was published. The accounts in the memoir are about her husband, but the writing gives insight to what a great writer Charlotte was. Her husband, Philippe, wrote an account of her death, in which he claimed that she continued to affirm her Protestant faith until the day she died.

== Sources ==
- Mémoires de Madame de Mornay
- Mémoires et correspondance de Duplessis-Mornay (1824)
- Memoires de messire Philippes de Mornay, seignevr dv Plessis Marli
- Mémoires de messire Philippes de Mornay, seigneur Du Plessis Marli,... contenans divers discours, instructions, lettres et dépesches par lui dressées ou escrites aux rois, roines... depuis l'an 1572 jusques à l'an 1589, ensemble quelques lettres dessusdits audit sieur Du Plessis (rédigés sur les mémoires de Charlotte Arbaleste, femme de Plessis de Mornay, par David Liques et Valentin Conrart, et publiés par Jean Daillé)
- Berriot-Salvadore, Evelyne. Les femmes dans la société française de la Renaissance. Genève, Droz, 1990, p. 127-133.
- "Catholic Encyclopedia: Huguenots." New Advent: Home. 25 Oct. 2011.CATHOLIC ENCYCLOPEDIA: Huguenots
- Crouzet, Denis. La nuit de la Saint-Barthélemy. Paris, Fayard 1994, p. 68-77.
- Daussy, Hugues. Les Huguenots et le roi. Genève, Droz, 2002, passim.
- "Erreur." Musée virtuel Du protestantisme : Informations théologiques, débats, tradition protestante. Web. 26 Nov. 2011.
- Kuperty-Tsur, Nadine. Se dire à la Renaissance en France. Paris, Vrin, 1997.
- Kuperty-Tsur, Nadine. "Charlotte Arbaleste." Siefar. 2003. 20 Nov. 2011.
- Robin, Diana Maury, Larsen, Anne R. and Levin, Carole (2007). Encyclopedia of Women in the Renaissance: Italy, France, and England. ABC-CLIO, Inc.
- "Who Were the Huguenots?" The National Huguenot Society. Web. 14 Nov. 2011.
