= 1630 in France =

- Decades: 1610s; 1620s; 1630s; 1640s; 1650s
- See also: History of France; Timeline of French history; List of years in France

Events from the year 1630 in France.

== Incumbents ==
- Monarch – Louis XIII

== Events ==
- 10 July – Battle of Veillane

== Births ==
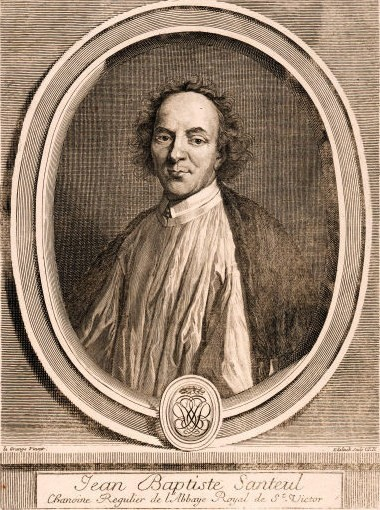
Jean-Baptiste de Santeul

=== Full date missing ===
- Charles La Tourasse, painter (died 1696)
- Jacques Rousseau, painter (died 1693)
- Gabriel Blanchard, painter (died 1704)
- Jean-Baptiste de Santeul, poet (died 1697)

== Deaths ==
- 29 April – Agrippa d'Aubigné, poet, soldier and chronicler (born 1552)

=== Full date missing ===
- Jacques de Harlay, nobleman
- Charles Emmanuel I, Duke of Savoy (born 1562)
