= Dominique Barrière =

French painter and engraver

Dominique Barrière (c.1622–1678) was a French painter and engraver.

== Life ==
Barrière was born at Marseilles in about 1622. He spent most of his career in Rome, where he engraved a considerable number of plates, after Claude and other landscape painters, as well as other subjects. They are neatly etched in the manner of Stefano della Bella. He died in Rome in 1678. He sometimes signed his plates with his name, Dominicus Barriere Massiliensis, and sometimes with the cipher which is the mark used by Domenico del Barbiere, and thus mistakes frequently arise, although their styles are extremely different.

== Works ==
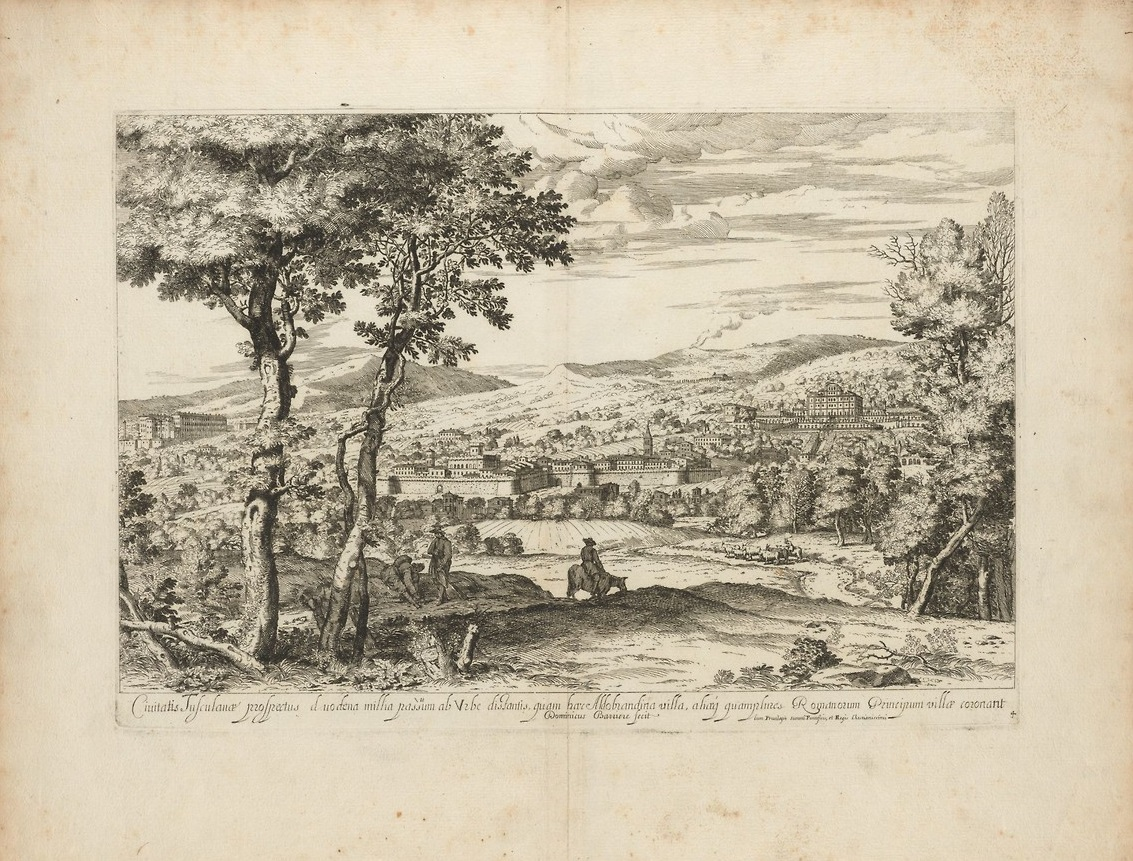
Engraving of Villa Aldobrandina Tusculana, 1647

His works include:

- Portrait of Jean de la Valette; marked D. B.; scarce
- A set of six landscapes
- A set of 12 landscapes, dedicated to Lelio Orsini, 1651
- Seven Views of the Villa Aldobrandini, 1649
- A landscape, with the Zodiac, inscribed Vim profert ubi, etc.
- A view of Frascati
- Fontana maggiore nel Giardino di Tivoli, with his cipher
- Eighty-four views and statues of the Villa Pamphili.
- Four, entitled Catafalco e apparato nella ehiesa, etc.
- Sepulchral Monument of N. L. Plumbini, Dominicus Barriere Gallus, in. ex. del. et scul.
- Hercules, after a basso-rilievo in the Medicean Garden
- A large plate; entitled Circum Urbis Agonalibus, etc. with many figures, 1650
- Several plates of the History of Apollo, after the pictures by Domenichino and Viola
