= Tomb of Valentina Balbiani =

16th-century French tomb monument

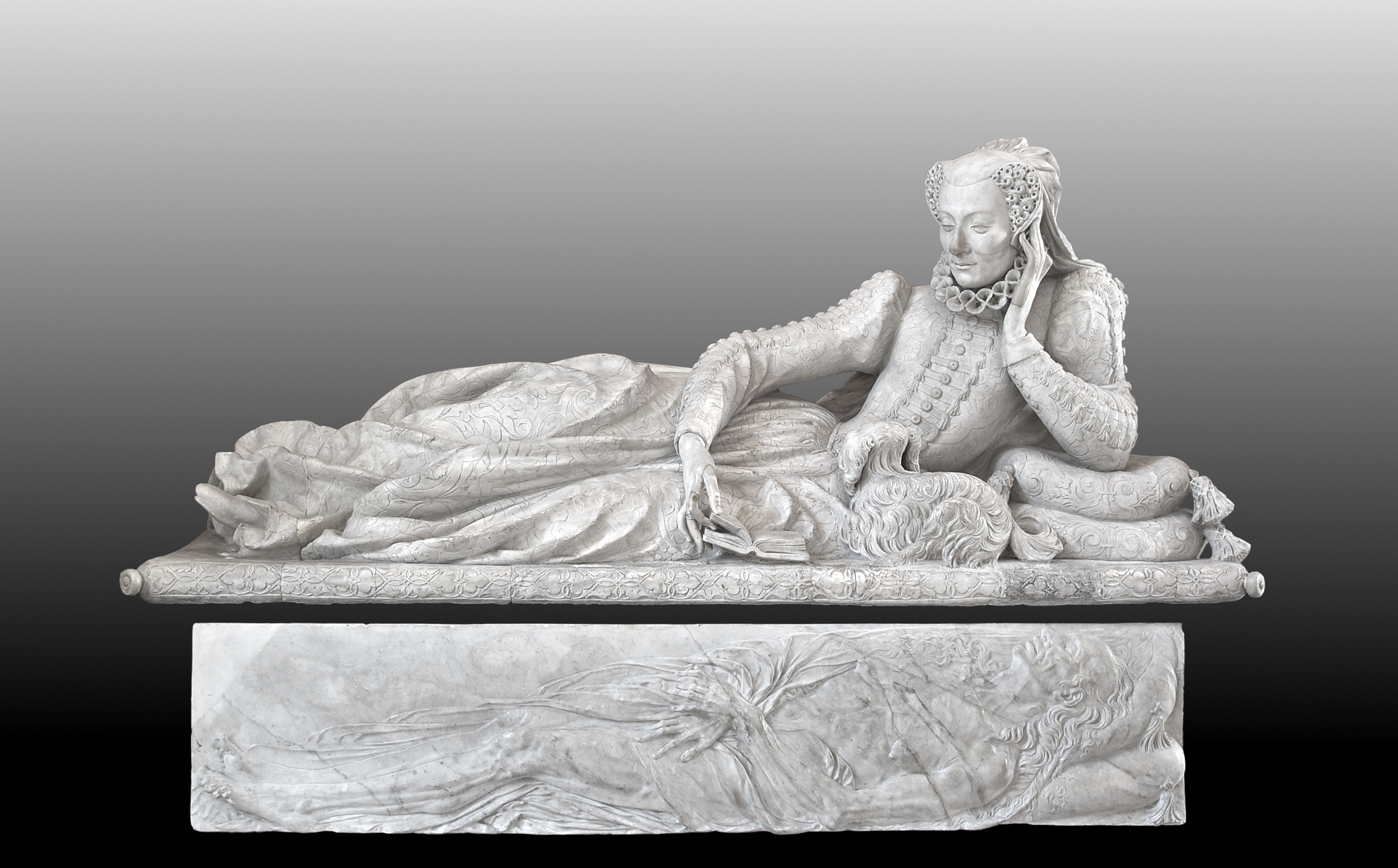
- Artist: Germain Pilon
- Medium: Marble
- Dimensions: 83.0 cm × 49.0 cm × 191.4 cm (2 ft 8.7 in × 1 ft 7.3 in × 6 ft 3.4 in)
- Location: Louvre; Paris

The Tomb of Valentina Balbiani is a white marble tomb sculpture constructed by the French sculptor Germain Pilon c. 1580 for Jeanne Valentine Balbiani (1518–1572), the Italian wife of the French statesman, chancellor and cardinal René de Birague (1506–1583).

Once part of a large and very complex monument, the remaining pieces consists of two depictions of Balbiani: one showing her alive and propped up reading a book, the other showing her emaciated body in death. The monument was originally in the Couvent Sainte-Catherine-du-Val-des-Écoliers, Paris, which was destroyed during the French Revolution. The monument was dismantled in 1793, and the effigies have been in the collection of the Louvre since 1847, and are now in room 214.

== Commission ==
Valentine Balbiani came from Chieri, today a suburb of Turin in Italy. In 1465 she married the French statesman René de Birague, with whom she had a daughter. De Birague commission the funerary monument shortly after her death in 1572, and hired the French Mannerist sculptor Germain Pilon (1535–1590) for its design and construction. Pilon had earlier designed a tomb for Henry II of France and Catherine de' Medici. It is thought that work began on the monument sometime around 1580, although some art historians believe it was completed c. 1574.

De Birague entered the church after Valentina's death, eventually rising to cardinal. His own tomb was described by the art historian Alida Radcliffe as "much less interesting". Both were buried under the tomb, which was originally located in the church of St. Catherine du Val-des-Écoliers, Paris. However, the church was destroyed during the French Revolution; today both effigies are in the collection of the Louvre.

== Description ==
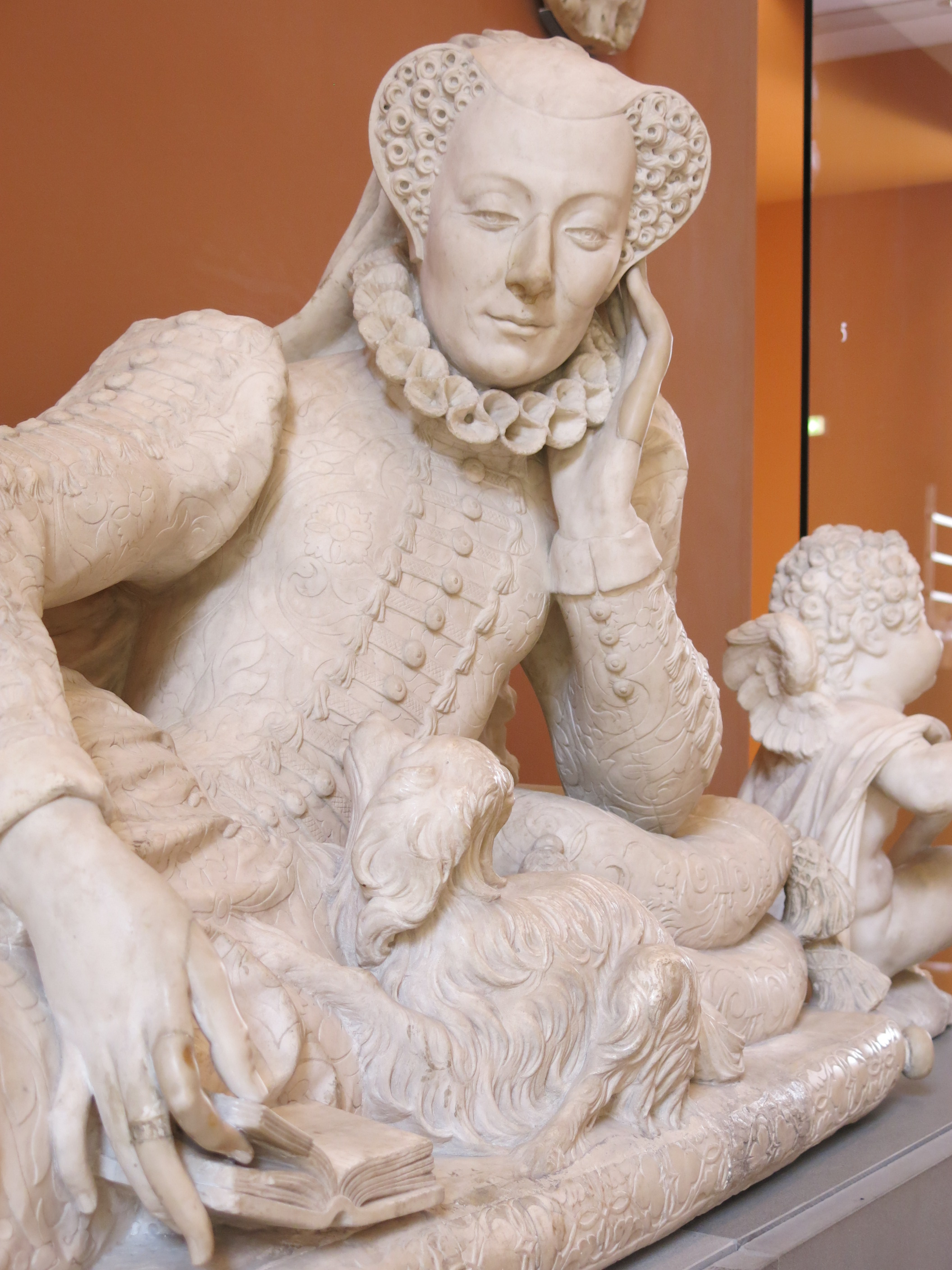
Detail showing the prayer book, dog and one of the putti.

The tomb was built as part of a much larger and elaborate structure, the rest of which is now lost and known only from a drawing. Originally, two angles were position in niches above the monument. Each held inscriptions in French and Latin that translate as "Who is well loved is not forgotten" and "Who lives in heaven is not dead".

=== Alive ===
The upper effigy shows her as if alive: still relatively young and sitting upright in the "sweetly sad" pose, Her face is thought to be an accurate, unidealised depiction of how she looked. She is dressed in a sumptuous but formal dress, and reads from a prayer book as a dog sits at her side. Two putti (not pictured above) holding lowered torches are perched respectively near her head a feet.

=== Dead ===
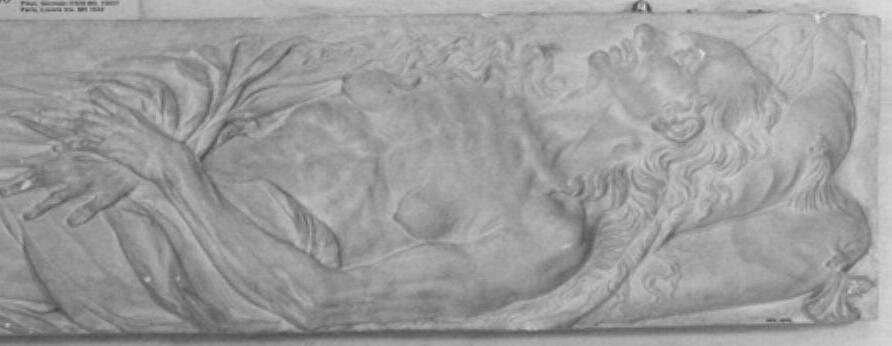
Full length view of one side of the tomb chest

In contrast, the imagery on the long sides of the tomb's chest is much smaller than life-size, in bas (flat) relief, and shows her as a skeletal gisant (or transi) after death, naked except for a shroud around her waist.

According to the writer Jeffrey Meyers, the chest shows her "frightening change from elegant beauty to emaciated cadaver. The cushions now support Valentine’s bare skull, and her skeletal hands clutch the cerements to hide her private parts.

== Sources ==
- Bleeke, Marian. Motherhood and Meaning in Medieval Sculpture: Representations from France, c. 1100-1500. Boydell Press, 2017. ISBN 978-1-7832-7250-1
- Cohen, Kathleen. Metamorphosis of a Death Symbol: The Transi Tomb in the Late Middle Ages and the Renaissance. Los Angeles: University of California Press, 1973. ISBN 978-0-5200-1844-0
- Jouanna, Arlette. Histoire et Dictionnaire des Guerres de Religion. Bouquins, 1998
- Harris, Duncan. "Tombs, Guidebooks and Shakespearean Drama: Death in the Renaissance". Mosaic: An Interdisciplinary Critical Journal, volume 15, nr 1, Death and Dying, Winter 1982. JSTOR 24777744
- Meyers, Jeffrey. "Reviewed Work: New Selected Poems by Thom Gunn, Clive Wilmer". The Kenyon Review, volume 41, nr. 4, July/August 2019
- Panofsky, Erwin. Tomb Sculpture: Its Changing Aspects from Ancient Egypt to Bernini. London: Harry Abrams, 1964. ISBN 978-0-8109-3870-0
- Radcliffe, Alida Graveraet. Schools and Masters of Sculpture. New York: Appleton, 1908
