= Philippe de Mornay =

French Protestant writer (1549–1623)

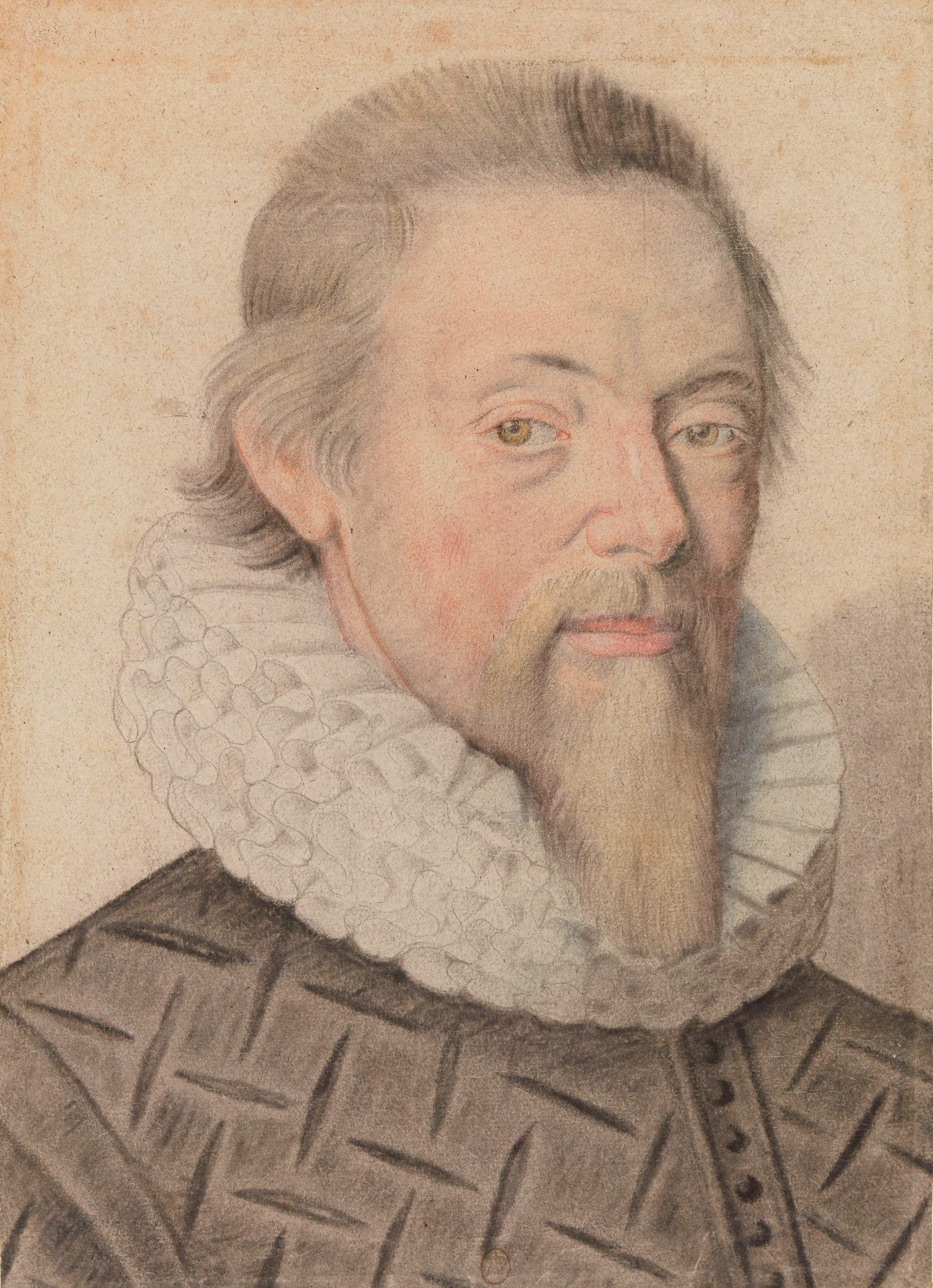
- Born: November 5, 1549; Buhy
- Died: November 11, 1623 (aged 74); La Forêt-sur-Sèvre, Deux-Sèvres
- Education: University of Paris (Collège de Lisieux); University of Heidelberg; University of Padua
- Occupations: Writer, diplomat, politician
- Notable work: '
- Theological work
- Era: 16th / 17th century
- Tradition or movement: Calvinism (Huguenots)
- Main interests: Ecclesiology, French Wars of Religion, anti-monarchism

Philippe de Mornay (5 November 1549 – 11 November 1623), seigneur du Plessis Marly, usually known as Du-Plessis-Mornay or Mornay Du Plessis, was a French Protestant writer and member of the anti-monarchist Monarchomaques.

== Biography ==
He was born in Buhy, now situated in Val-d'Oise. His mother had leanings toward Protestantism, but his father tried to counteract her influence by sending him to the Collège de Lisieux of the University of Paris. On his father's death in 1559, however, the family formally adopted the reformed faith. Mornay studied law and jurisprudence at the University of Heidelberg in 1565 and the following year Hebrew and German at the University of Padua. During the French Wars of Religion in 1567, he joined the army of Louis I de Bourbon, prince de Condé, but a fall from his horse prevented him from taking an active part in the campaign. His career as Huguenot apologist began in 1571 with the work Dissertation sur l'Église visible, and, as a diplomat in 1572, he undertook a confidential mission for Admiral de Coligny to William the Silent, Prince of Orange.

He escaped the St. Bartholomew's Day Massacre by the aid of a Catholic friend, taking refuge in England. Returning to France towards the end of 1573, he participated during the next two years with various success in the campaigns of the future Henry IV of France, then only King of Navarre. He was taken prisoner by the Duke of Guise on 10 October 1575 was but ransomed for a small sum, which was paid by Charlotte Arbaleste, whom he married shortly afterwards at Sedan.

Philippe de Mornay was gradually recognized as Henry's right-hand man, representing him in England from 1577 to 1578 and again in 1580, and in the Low Countries 1581-1582. During his time in England, both he and his wife befriended English Protestants like Francis Walsingham, Mary Sidney, and her brother Philip Sydney. With the death of the Duke of Alençon-Anjou in 1584, by which Henry was brought within sight of the throne of France, the period of Mornay's greatest political activity began, and after the death of Henry I, Prince of Condé, in 1588, his influence became so great that he was popularly styled the "Huguenot pope". He was present at the siege of Dieppe, fought at the battle of Ivry, and was at the siege of Rouen in 1591-92 until he was sent on a mission to the court of Queen Elizabeth.

He was bitterly disappointed by Henry IV's abjuration of Protestantism in 1593 and gradually withdrew from the court, devoting himself to the Academy of Saumur, which had a distinguished history until its suppression by Louis XIV in 1683.

His last years were saddened by the loss of his only son in 1605 and that of his devoted wife in 1606, but he spent them in perfecting the Huguenot organization. He was chosen a deputy in 1618 to represent the French Protestants at the Synod of Dort. He was prohibited from attending by Louis XIII but contributed materially to its deliberations by written communications. He lost the governorship of Saumur at the time of the Huguenot insurrection in 1621 as Saumur was captured by French royal forces, and died in retirement on his estate of La Forêt-sur-Sèvre, Deux-Sèvres.

== Works ==
In 1598 he published a work on which he had long been engaged, entitled De L'institution, usage et doctrine du saint sacrement de l'eucharistie en l'église ancienne, containing about 5,000 citations from the scriptures, fathers and schoolmen. Jacques Davy Du Perron, bishop of Évreux (who later became cardinal and archbishop of Sens), accused Mornay of misquoting at least 500, and a public disputation was held at Fontainebleau on 4 May 1600. Decision was awarded to Du Perron on nine points presented, when the disputation was interrupted by the illness of Mornay. The Duke of Sully reported that Mornay "had defended himself so poorly that he made some laugh, made others angry, and inspired pity in still others." Mornay was also instrumental in the drafting of the Edict of Nantes (1598) which established political rights and some religious freedom for the Huguenots.

His principal works, in addition to those mentioned above, are Excellent discours de la vie et de la mort (London, 1577), a bridal present to Charlotte Arbaleste; Traité de l'Église où l'on traite des principales questions qui ont été mues sur ce point en nostre temps (London, 1578); Traité de la vérité de la religion chrétienne contre les athées, épicuriens, payens, juifs, mahométans et autres infidèles (Antwerp, 1581); Le mystère d'iniquité, c'est à dire, l'histoire de la papauté (Geneva, 1611). Two volumes of Mémoires, from 1572 to 1589, appeared at La Forêt (1624–1625), and a continuation in 2 vols. at Amsterdam (1652); a more complete but very inaccurate edition (Mémoires, correspondances, et vie) in 12 vols. was published at Paris in 1624-1625. He is also one—many consider the most likely—candidate for being author of the Vindiciae contra tyrannos (1579), a pamphlet advocating resistance to the French crown.

== Bibliography ==
- Life of Mornay written by his wife for the instruction of their son, Mémoires de Mme Duplessis-Mornay, vol.1 in the ed. of Mémoires et correspondences de Duplessis-Mornay (Paris, 1824–1825);
- E. and E. Haag, La France protestante, article "Mornay";
- J. Ambert, Du Plessis-Mornay (Paris, 1847);
- Philippe Bobichon, "La polémique contre les juifs dans les travaux des hébraïsants chrétiens de France", in G. Dahan and Annie Noblesse-Rocher (dir.), Les hébraïsants chrétiens en France, au XVIe siècle, Genève, Droz, 2018, pp. 187–215 online
- Pitts, Vincent J. (2009). Henri IV of France: His Reign and Age. Baltimore: The Johns Hopkins Press. ISBN 9780801890277.
- E. Stahelin, Der Übertritt K. Heinrichs IV. von Frankreich zur katholischen Kirche (Basel, 1856);
- Weiss, Du Plessis Mornay comme théologien (Strassburg, 1867).
- Article "Du Plessis-Mornay" by T. Schott in Hauck's Realencyklopädie
- Article by Grube in Kirchenlexikon.
