= Chalais conspiracy =

1626 French political conspiracy

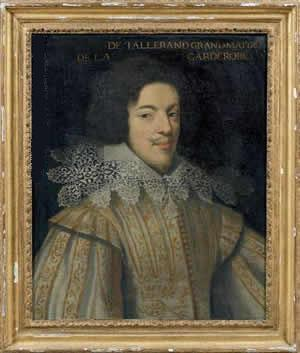
Henri de Talleyrand-Périgord, comte de Chalais

The Chalais conspiracy was a 1626 conspiracy in France directed against Cardinal Richelieu, Louis XIII's chief minister. It was the first, but not the last conspiracy of the nobility against the minister. The conspiracy is named after Henri de Talleyrand-Périgord, comte de Chalais, who confessed it to the king and the cardinal and was later executed for his part in it.

== Background ==
Louis XIII and Richelieu were planning a marriage for Gaston, Duke of Orléans, the king's younger brother. As Louis and his Queen Anne of Austria were childless, Gaston was the only heir to the throne. Their choice fell on Marie de Bourbon, Duchess of Montpensier. Gaston, encouraged by his governor Jean-Baptiste d'Ornano, did not want to marry this rich heiress, and a party of "aversion to marriage" gathered around him.

D'Ornano had already been imprisoned based on false accusations by Charles de La Vieuville, Superintendent of Finances; although released and named Marshal of France, his resentment prompted him to support thwarting the king's plan. Queen Anne of Austria was interested in preventing Gaston's marriage, because she wanted the royal line to consist only of her issue with the king. Marie de Rohan, Duchess of Chevreuse, a great enemy of the cardinal, and Superintendent of the Queen's household, also took part in the early intrigues of this group.

Other nobles, such as Louis, Count of Soissons (suitor of Mademoiselle de Montpensier), Henri II, Prince of Condé, the Princess of Conti, and her lover François de Bassompierre also joined in the enterprise. The half-brothers of Louis XIII and Gaston, César, Duke of Vendôme and Alexandre, Chevalier de Vendôme, also became involved, and sought to get rid not only of Richelieu, but also of Louis XIII, in order to put Gaston on the throne. The plotters planned to have the Anne of Austria marry the future king, leaving her on the throne after the removal of her husband. The Duke of Vendôme would then become the power behind the throne.

The Count of Chalais, a gentleman of the king's household, was highly regarded by the king, who had appointed him master of the wardrobe. He had grown close to Gaston following the support the prince and his friends had shown in 1623 when, in a duel, he had killed a man who claimed to be his wife's lover. Later Chalais himself was seduced by the Duchess of Chevreuse, and he became even closer with the network around Prince Gaston.

== The plot unravels ==
The conspirators hatched a plot to assassinate Richelieu at Fleury-en-Bière, at his home, while Gaston was visiting him. During a feigned dispute between Gaston's gentlemen, Chalais was to assassinate Richelieu with his sword. However, Chalais confided in his uncle, who ordered him to confess the whole affair to the king and the cardinal. Richelieu acted to ensure the plot could not succeed. Instead of receiving Gaston at his house, Richelieu moved out so the prince had the entire place at his disposal. He then asked Chalais to spy on the conspiracy, and began moving against Gaston's supporters.

The Keeper of the Seals, Chancellor d'Aligre, who was close to Gaston, was forced to resign, and was replaced by Michel de Marillac. Gaston himself was harshly reprimanded, and on 31 May he was obliged to sign a document attesting to his loyalty and obedience to the king and his mother Marie de Medicis; on the same day, the Prince of Condé abandoned the conspiracy. On 13 June 1626, in Blois, the Vendôme brothers were arrested and imprisoned first at Amboise, then at the Château de Vincennes. Gaston, reconciled with his brother, accepted the idea of marriage.

Despite these moves the plot did not entirely run out of steam, and Chalais, still acting as a double agent, became increasingly involved. There was talk of having Gaston leave secretly for Metz. Chalais contacted first the Marquis de La Valette, governor of the city, then the governor's father, the Duke of Épernon. This time Chalais' uncle warned Richelieu of his nephew's sympathies directly. Gaston was hauled in before the king, Richelieu, the queen mother and the new Keeper of the Seals Marillac, and confessed to the whole affair, implicating his former accomplices.

== Breaking the conspiracy ==
Chalais was arrested on 8 July (it was a former friend of his, Louvigny, who denounced his criminal intentions against the king). Louis XIII charged the Keeper of the Seals with conducting a judicial investigation and Chalais was tried in the Cordeliers convent in Nantes, where the court had moved during the Estates of Brittany. After confessing in full, he was sentenced to death for crimes of lèse-majesté on 18 July. His friends dissuaded the executioner from doing his job, so a condemned man was pardoned and set to the task instead. The execution took place on the fr:Place du Bouffay. A sword was used first, then a doloire, but the man had difficulty in carrying out the decapitation: at the twentieth blow of the axe, Chalais was still alive, and only expired with the twenty-ninth or thirtieth blow.

The Duchess of Chevreuse went into exile and was received by Charles IV, Duke of Lorraine. D'Ornano died in prison on 2 September, before he could be tried. Alexandre de Vendôme would also die in prison in 1629; César remained imprisoned until 1630, was then exiled but returned to France in 1632. Marshal de Bassompierre and the Princess de Conti were not disgraced until after the Day of the Dupes, in 1631.

Gaston married Mademoiselle de Montpensier, and received the duchies of Orléans and Chartres and the county of Blois. His wife died in childbirth the following year, leaving only one daughter, Anne Marie Louise d'Orléans, Duchess of Montpensier, allowing the intrigues around him to resume shortly after.
