= Charles Loyseau =

French lawyer

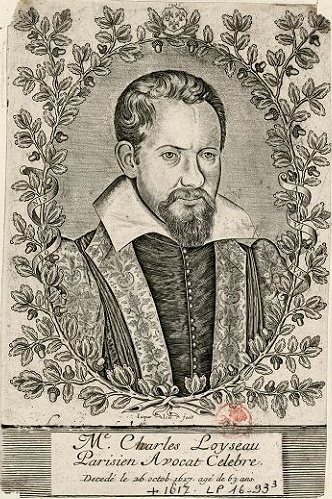
Charles Loyseau's Portrait

Charles Loyseau (1564–1627) was a French jurist, a lawyer in the Parlement of Paris, the highest royal court in France, as well as a judge in local and seigneurial courts. He evaluated French society and law in his best-known work, A Treatise on Orders and Simple Dignities, written in 1610; it is now a source for understanding the French social structure of the seventeenth and eighteenth centuries.

== Life ==
He was born in Paris, in 1564 the son of an advocate who worked for Diane de Poitiers. He was employed as an official in Sens, and subsequently by Catherine de Gonzague, duchesse de Longueville, as bailli in the County of Dunois. Later in life he was in practice as a Paris advocate, and in 1620 was President of the Order of Advocates.

== A Treatise on Orders ==
A Treatise on Orders is considered the most comprehensive account of the orders of the three Estates. This work was used to justify France's social organization up until the end of the Old Regime in 1789.

A Treatise on Orders evaluates the three orders and how they function in society. Loyseau puts particular emphasis on the fact that these orders were established by social custom and tradition, not mandate or statute. He defines each order by the role it served in society, and shows how they were afforded certain rights and obligations not shared. The rigorous boundaries and roles of each order allowed absolutely no social mobility, but there was some mobility within their own hierarchy. Loyseau believed the advantage to such a system was that it created a whole society, without fragments, with every person knowing his or her clearly defined place.

First Estate, Clergy

The clergy were regarded as the highest order for their association with God, and most respected for their job to provide salvation. They were divided amongst themselves as subdeacon, deacon, priest, bishop, cardinal, and monk. They were distinguished in society by their shaved hair and long robes, a tradition associated with the toga of Romans and were completely tax exempt.

Second Estate, Nobility

This order was divided into simple nobility, high nobility and princes. Simply nobility, or gentlemen, were men who were not given a higher degree of honor. High nobility were men given special appointments, such as knighthood, high office, or fiefs. The only princes were by blood only, which signified relation to the sovereign. This order served in the high positions of the Court and state, and was also tax exempt. They were given special privileges, such as no nobleman could be condemned to hanging or flogging, and all were able to carry a sword as an outward symbol of their nobility. Together with the clergy they comprised the ruling class.

Third Estate, Commoners

The final order included men of letters, (doctors, philosophers, teachers) financiers (anyone handling finances among provinces, parishes, or individuals) merchants, men of affairs (business men of any kind, notaries, attorneys, etc.), peasants, and laborers. They were distinguished by the work they provided, starting with men of highest education and monetary positions, descending to those men who had no job (beggars, vagabonds), who were considered the lowest of society. Loyseau is very critical of this order and did not consider it to be a sign of dignity to be part of the Third Estate, but merely definition of occupation.
