= Paul Hay du Chastelet =

Paul Hay du Chastelet (November 1592 – 26 April 1636) was a French magistrate, orator, and writer. His brother, Daniel Hay du Chastelet de Chambon, was a mathematician.

== Biography ==
Du Chastelet was born at Laval, Mayenne, a member of the ancient house of Hay in Brittany region of France. He became a councillor in 1616 and Advocate-General of the Parliament of Brittany in 1618.
