= Henri de Talleyrand-Périgord, comte de Chalais =

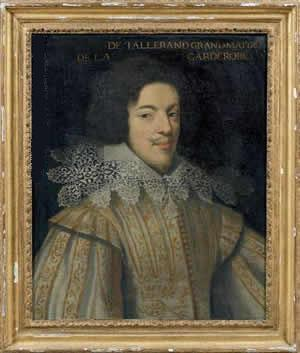
Henri de Talleyrand-Périgord

Henri de Talleyrand-Périgord, comte de Chalais (1599–1626) was a favorite of Louis XIII.

He was born in 1599 as son to Daniel de Talleyrand-Périgord, Prince de Chalais and Françoise de Montluc, daughter of Maréchal de Montluc. He started to serve in the military early in his life. He was at the Siege of Montauban in 1621. He became Head of the King's Wardrobe to King Louis XIII.

He married Charlotte de Castille and fought and killed her lover in a duel.

He was accused of conspiracy against Cardinal Richelieu, arrested at Nantes, and beheaded by an unskilled axeman who took over 30 blows to sever the head.

== See also ==
- Chalais conspiracy
