= Domenico del Barbiere =

Italian artist

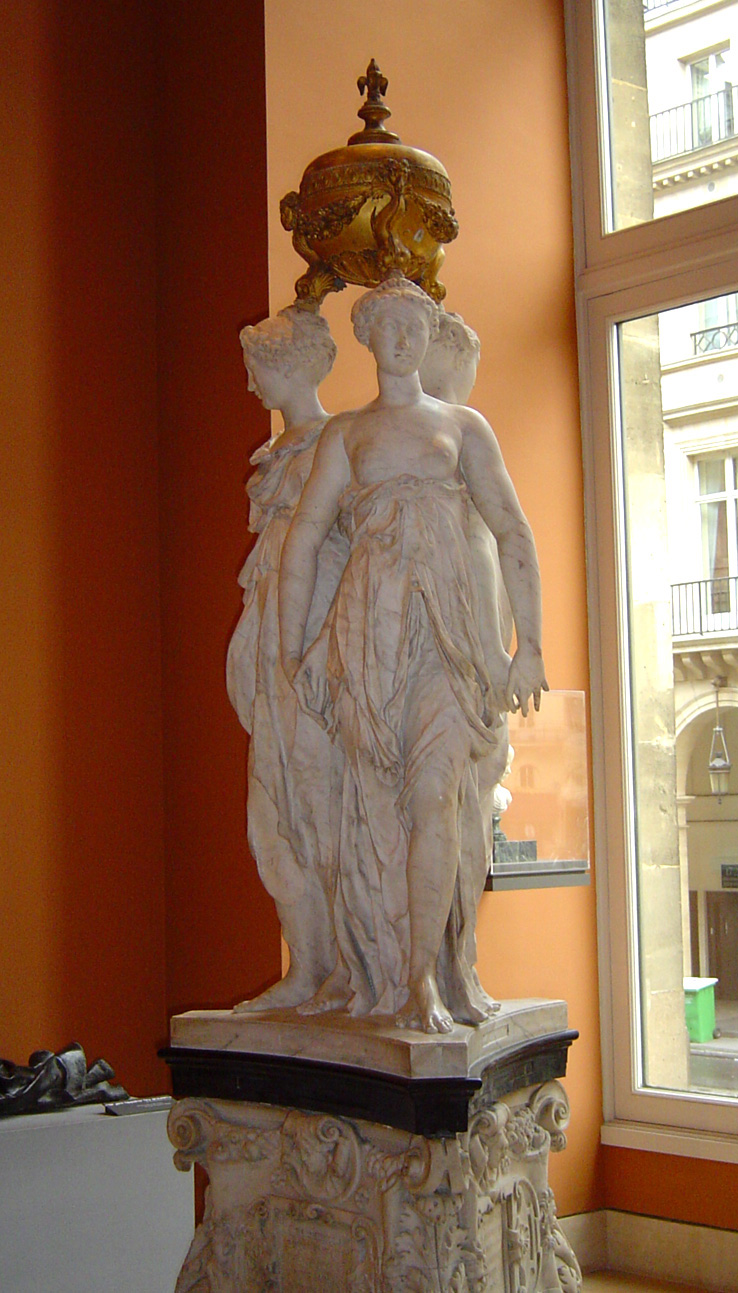
Monument for the heart of Henry II. The Three Graces were sculpted by Germain Pilon and the base by Domenico del Barbiere. The urn is a nineteenth-century restoration.

Domenico del Barbiere (c. 1506 – c. 1570) was a Florentine artist of the Renaissance period, also referred to as Domenico Fiorentino, and, in France, Dominique Florentin.

He settled and married at Troyes in France between 1530 and 1533. He joined the studio of Italian artists who worked with Primaticcio and Rosso Fiorentino at Fontainebleau and Meudon. He worked both on the stucco-work and frescoes. He was also an engraver.

In 1541, he returned to Troyes, where he enjoyed success as a sculptor for churches. His style of sculpture was influenced, particularly in the heads and the drapery, by Andrea Sansovino, and shows Mannerist characteristics. His Charity, at Saint-Pantaléon in Troyes, suggests that Domenico was aware of Michelangelo's use of contrapposto. His relief work for the tomb of Claude, Duke of Guise (died 1550), reveals the possible influence of Rosso and of Francesco Salviati. (Note: Blunt, 82–83.)

Vasari noted Domenico del Barbiere in his writings.

Under the direction of Primaticcio, Domenico executed the base for the monument for the heart of Henry II of France, the figures for which were sculpted by Germain Pilon. Pilon may have been influenced in the flowing drapery of the figures of the Three Graces by Domenico's work. (Note: Blunt, 94.) The monument was Domenico's last known commission.

== Notes ==
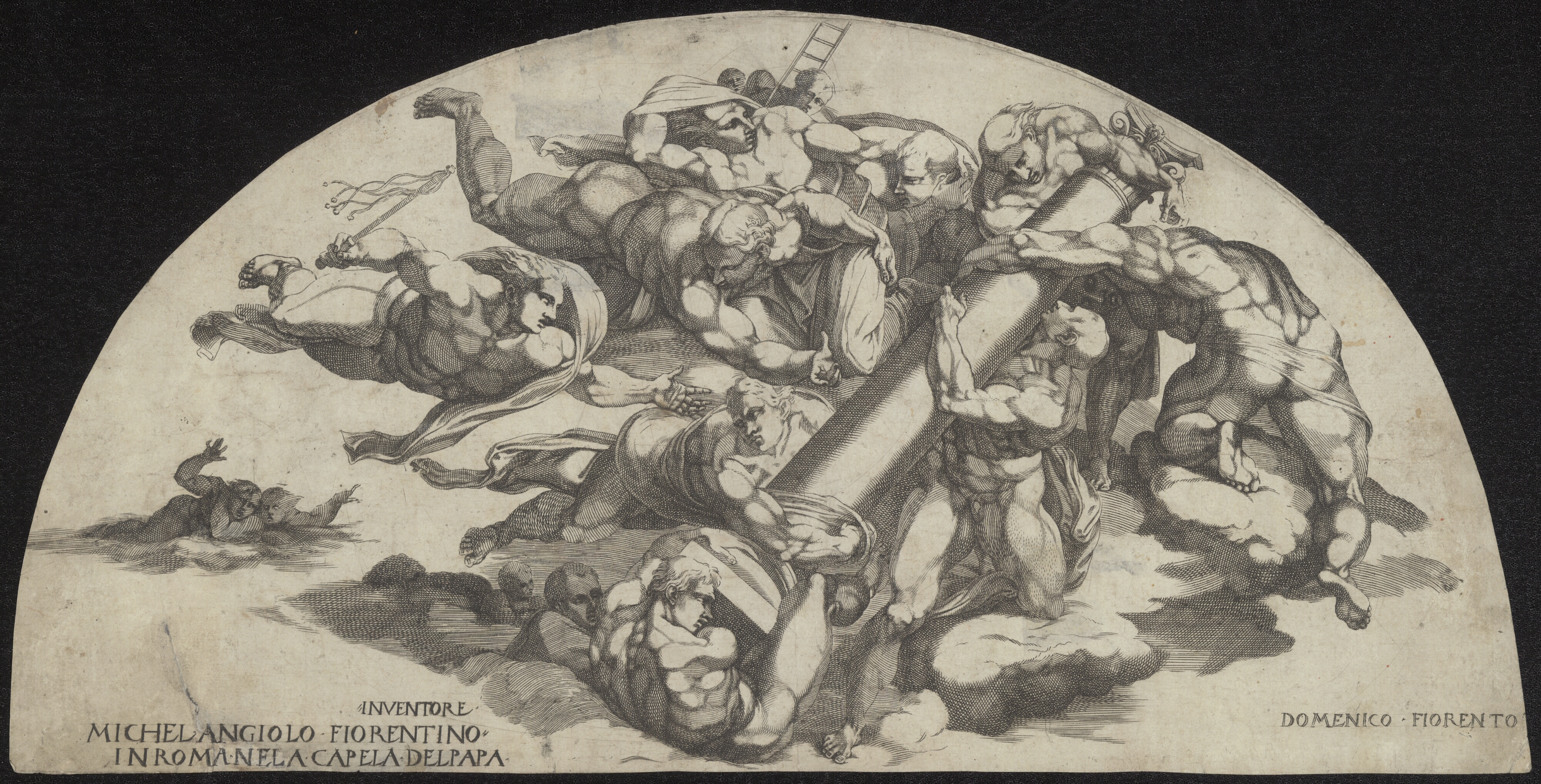
Domenico del Barbiere, Angels with the instruments of the Passion, after Michelangelo's Last Judgment.

== Bibliography ==
- Blunt, Anthony. Art and Architecture in France: 1500–1700. New Haven (CT): Yale University Press, [1957] 1999 edition. ISBN 0-300-07748-3.
- Farquhar, Maria (1855). Ralph Nicholson Wornum (ed.). Biographical catalogue of the principal Italian painters. London: Woodfall & Kinder. p. 16.
