= Daniel Hay du Chastelet de Chambon =

French mathematician (1596–1671)

- Born: 1596 October 23; Laval
- Died: 1671 April 20; Laval
- Occupation: Mathematician
- Office: member of the Académie française (1635)

Daniel Hay du Chastelet (23 October 1596, Laval – 20 April 1671) was a French clergyman and mathematician. His brother Paul Hay du Chastelet was also a writer.

== Biography ==
Member of the ancient Breton noble family of the Hay des Nétumières. He was the parish priest of Andouillé, doctor in theology at the Paris Faculty and abbot of Notre-Dame de Chambon Abbey. He was also the Dean of the Saint-Tugal de Laval Collegial Church from 1621 to 1671 and prior of the Convent of the Augustins of Vitré. He was trusted by the Cardinal Richelieu and correspondent of Marin Mersenne. He was elected member of the Académie française in 1635.

=== Abbot of Chambon ===
He was nominated by the King to be the abbot of the abbey on February 23, 1623, a position left vacant for him by Georges de la Trémoille. Pope Urban VIII approved this nomination by the papal bull of the 17 of the calend of september 1623. He would occupy the title for thirty-seven years, and would reform the abbey and cancel accusations of simony made by some of his predecessors

=== Death ===
He dies on April 20, 1671 in the deanery of Saint-Tugal de Laval where he lived and is buried close to the main altar in the Laval Cathedral. The chapter of the Saint-Tugal de Laval Collegial Church was given 120 livres to cover the costs of the burial.

== Works ==
He wrote a considerable amount on mathematics, but his nephew the marquis Paul Hay du Chastelet, knowing nothing about the subject, allegedly burnt the writings. His only writing that survives to this day is named Advis a la Reyne sur la conference de Ruel, and was written in 1649, this leaves to think that he was involved in the Fronde and was part of the conference of the Peace of Rueil in March 1648.
