= Treaty of Angoulême =

1619 treaty

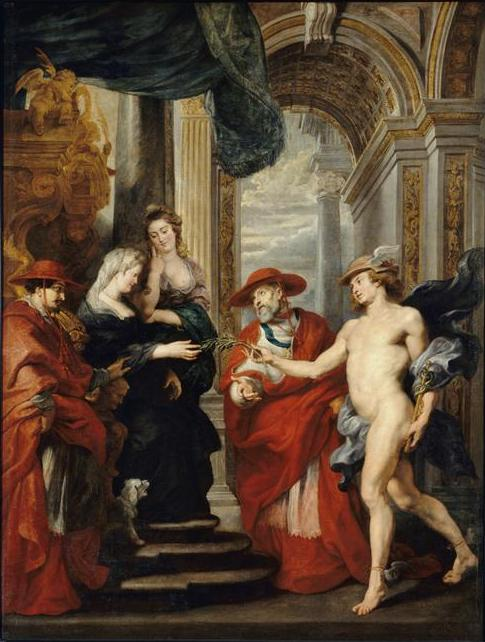
The Treaty of Angoulême by Peter Paul Rubens - H. : 3,94m; W. : 2,95m, (Musée du Louvres)

The Treaty of Angoulême was signed on 30 April 1619 between Queen Marie de Medici and her son, King Louis XIII in Angoulême, France. The accord was negotiated by Cardinal Richelieu and it officially ended the civil war in France between supporters of Queen Marie and supporters of King Louis. Moreover, the agreement established lines of reconciliation between mother and son.

== See also ==
- List of treaties
