= Doloire =

Type of axe

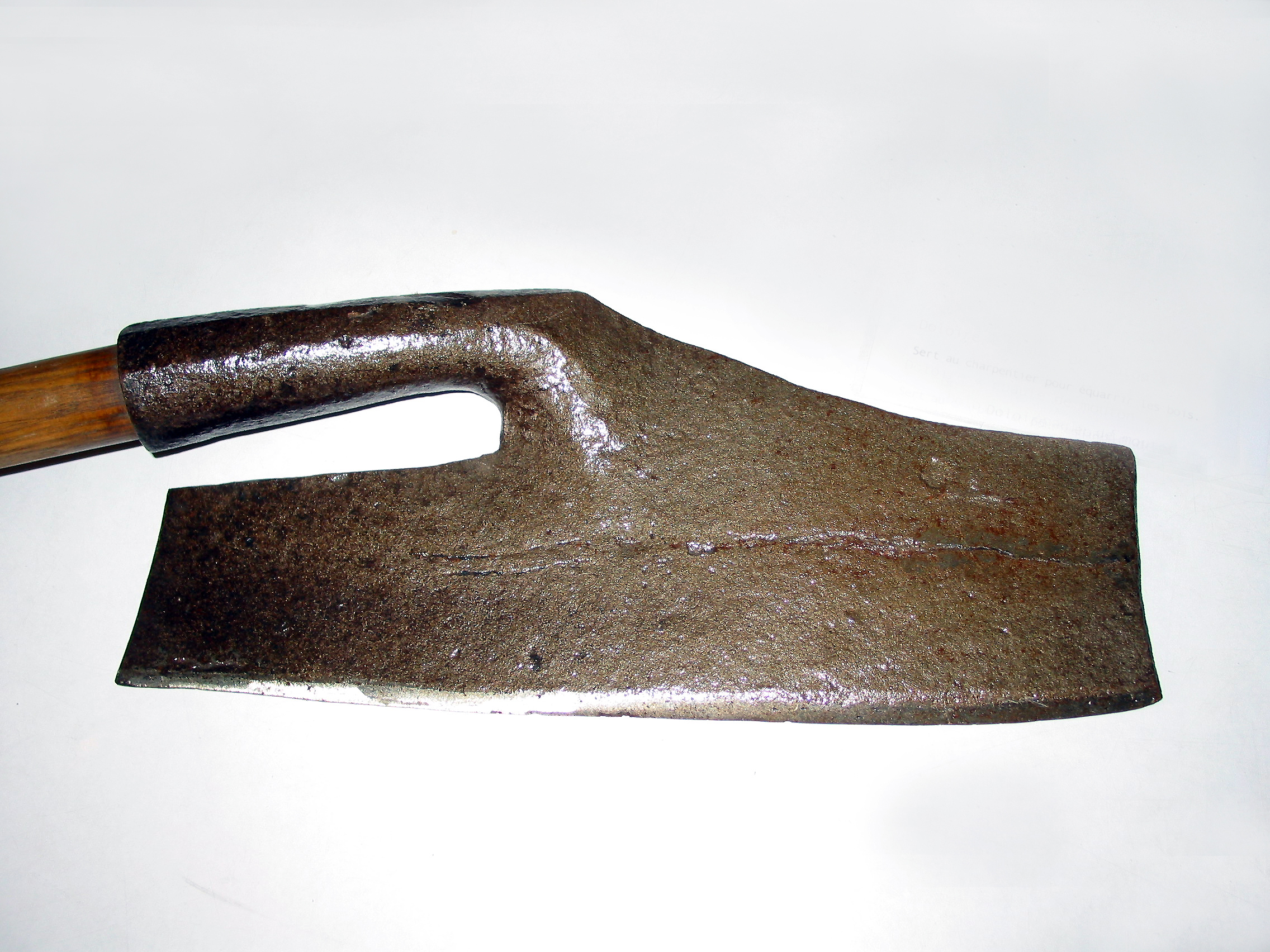
Doloire "épaule de mouton" (adze "shoulder of mutton").

The doloire or wagoner's axe was a tool and weapon used during the Middle Ages and Renaissance. The axe had a wooden shaft measuring approximately 1.5 metres (5 feet) in length and a head that was pointed at the top and rounded at the bottom, resembling either a teardrop or an isosceles triangle. The top of the shaft was fitted with a metal eye or socket that was welded to the head of the axe near the base of the blade. The upper part of the blade extended above the eye, while the opposite side of the socket featured a small blunt hammer head. The head of the axe itself measured approximately 44 cm. (17 inches) in length, was sharpened on the back and flattened bottom edges, and was uniformly decorated with punched and incised abstract floral patterns.

The term doloire is derived from the Latin dolabra, a tool axe used by legionaries of the Roman Empire. Its alternative name wagoner's axe originates from the fact that it was found most often in the hands of a wagoner, the man in charge of the supply trains accompanying troops on the march. The wagoner used the axe not only as a tool for working and shaping wood and repairing or building carts and wooden structures but also as a weapon for self defense.

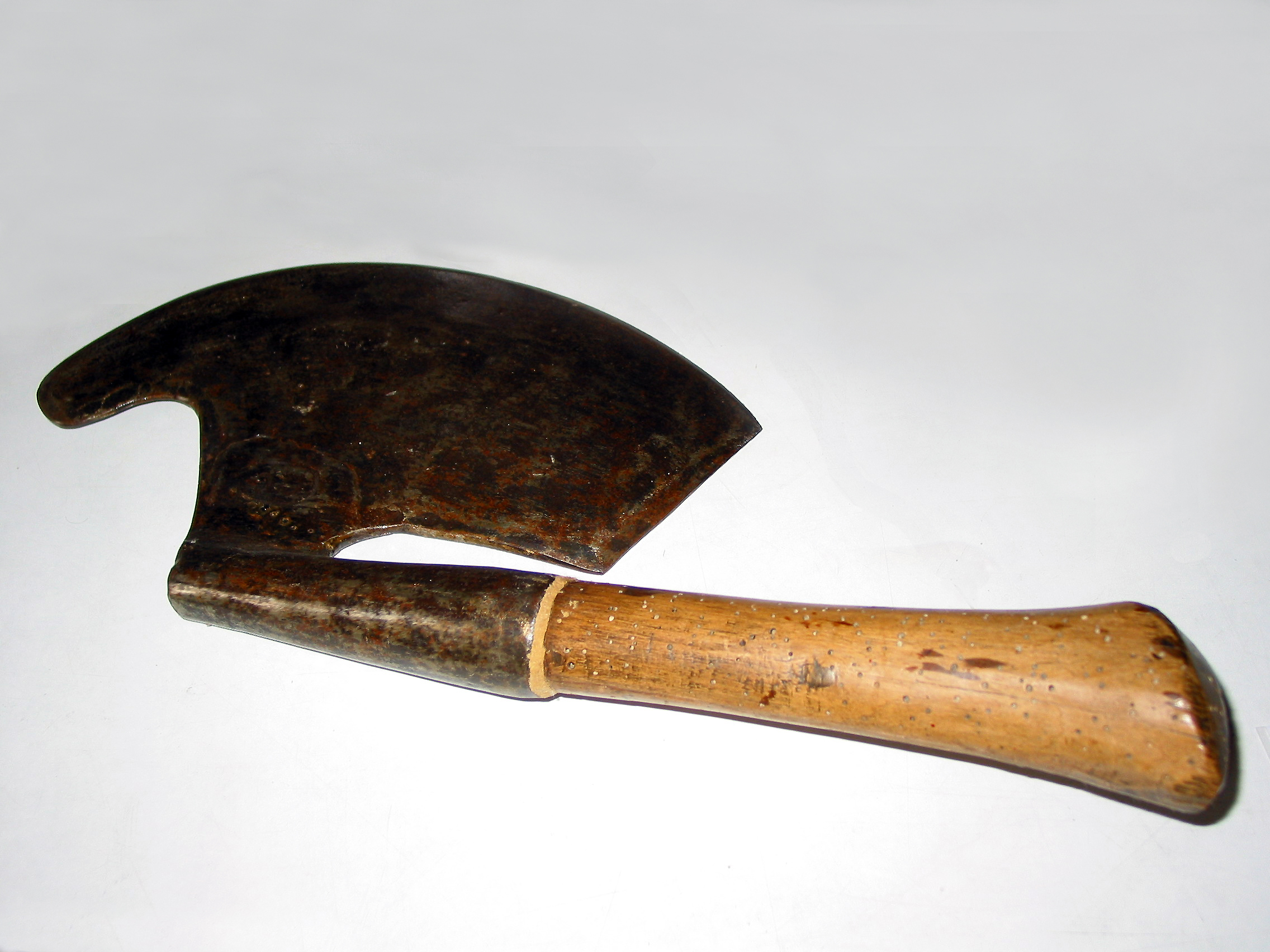
Doloire "de droite" (right adze)

While the hammer portion of the doloire could also be used offensively, its primary function was utilitarian. However, on display in the castle of Spiez in Switzerland, among other arms and armour, is a doloire with an opposing fluke or spike in place of a hammer, designed to penetrate body armour and indicating its primary purpose as a weapon.

There are also smaller, one-handed forms of the doloire, closer in size to a hatchet, and one of these is depicted in a woodcut by Albrecht Altdorfer from the Triumphal Procession of the Emperor Maximilian series of 1517. It is shown being carried, along with a boar spear, by a carpenter or wagoner accompanying a supply train.
