= Capture of Saumur =

Military investment during the Huguenot rebellions

Coordinates: 47.260000°N 0.0769°W

Capture of Sumar
- Part of the Huguenot rebellions
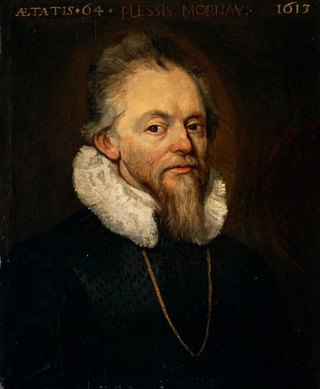
- The Huguenot leader Philippe de Mornay was tricked out of his command of Saumur.
Date	May 11th, 1621
Location	Saumur
Result	Royalist victory

Belligerents
France	Huguenots

Commanders and leaders
Louis XIII	Philippe de Mornay

The Capture of Saumur (French: Capture de Saumur) was the military investment of the Huguenot city of Saumur accomplished by the young French king Louis XIII on 11 May 1621, following the outbreak of the Huguenot rebellions. Although the Huguenot city was faithful to the king, Louis XIII nevertheless wished to affirm control over it. The Governor of the city Duplessy-Mornay was tricked out of his command of Saumur and the city was invested.

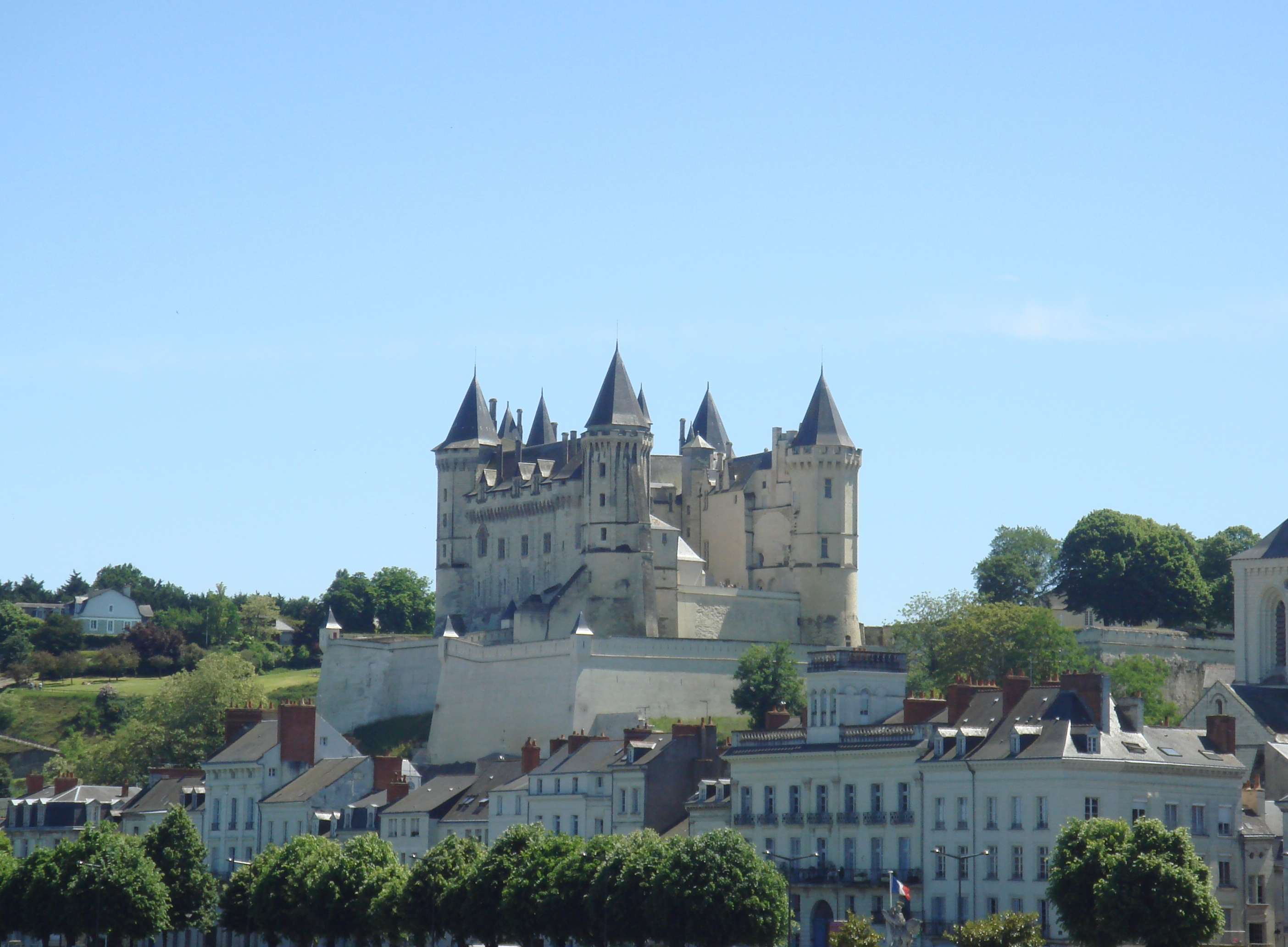
Saumur was easily invested as its Governor was tricked out of his command.

Louis XIII then continued his campaign southward against the Huguenots, and moved to the Protestant stronghold of Saint-Jean-d'Angély led by Rohan's brother Benjamin de Rohan, duc de Soubise. This led to the month-long Siege of Saint-Jean-d'Angély, and to a succession of other sieges in the south of France. On 24 June 1621, Louis XIII's campaign ended in a stalemate, leading to the 1622 Peace of Montpellier, which temporarily confirmed the rights of the Huguenots in France.

== See also ==
- Huguenot rebellions
