= 1706 =

1706 in various calendars
- Gregorian calendar: 1706; MDCCVI
- Ab urbe condita: 2459
- Armenian calendar: 1155; ԹՎ ՌՃԾԵ
- Assyrian calendar: 6456
- Balinese saka calendar: 1627–1628
- Bengali calendar: 1112–1113
- Berber calendar: 2656
- English Regnal year: 4 Ann. 1 – 5 Ann. 1
- Buddhist calendar: 2250
- Burmese calendar: 1068
- Byzantine calendar: 7214–7215
- Chinese calendar: 乙酉年 (Wood Rooster); 4403 or 4196 — to — 丙戌年 (Fire Dog); 4404 or 4197
- Coptic calendar: 1422–1423
- Discordian calendar: 2872
- Ethiopian calendar: 1698–1699
- Hebrew calendar: 5466–5467
- Hindu calendars
- Vikram Samvat: 1762–1763
- Shaka Samvat: 1627–1628
- Kali Yuga: 4806–4807
- Holocene calendar: 11706
- Igbo calendar: 706–707
- Iranian calendar: 1084–1085
- Islamic calendar: 1117–1118
- Japanese calendar: Hōei 3 (宝永３年)
- Javanese calendar: 1629–1630
- Julian calendar: Gregorian minus 11 days
- Korean calendar: 4039
- Minguo calendar: 206 before ROC 民前206年
- Nanakshahi calendar: 238
- Thai solar calendar: 2248–2249
- Tibetan calendar: ཤིང་མོ་བྱ་ལོ་ (female Wood-Bird); 1832 or 1451 or 679 — to — མེ་ཕོ་ཁྱི་ལོ་ (male Fire-Dog); 1833 or 1452 or 680

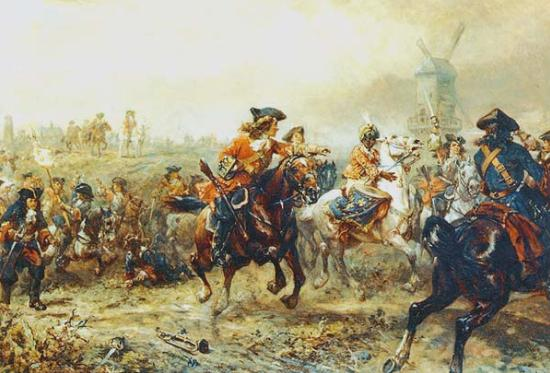
May 23: Duke of Marlborough leads troops to victory in Spanish Netherlands in Battle of Ramillies

1706 (MDCCVI) was a common year starting on Friday of the Gregorian calendar and a common year starting on Tuesday of the Julian calendar, the 1706th year of the Common Era (CE) and Anno Domini (AD) designations, the 706th year of the 2nd millennium, the 6th year of the 18th century, and the 7th year of the 1700s decade. As of the start of 1706, the Gregorian calendar was 11 days ahead of the Julian calendar, which remained in localized use until 1923.

In the Swedish calendar it was a common year starting on Monday, one day ahead of the Julian and ten days behind the Gregorian calendar.

== Events ==
=== January–March ===
- January 26
  - War of Spanish Succession: The uprising by Bavarians against the occupation of the Electorate of Bavaria by Austrian troops ends after 75 days, and ends the plans of Maximilian II Emanuel, the Elector of Bavaria, to bring Bavaria under the rule of the House of Wittelsbach.
  - Great Northern War – Battle of Grodno: A coalition of 34,000 Swedish and Polish troops besieges the then-Lithuanian city in the winter time, and clashes with 41,000 Russian and Saxon troops. After almost three months of fighting that lasts to April 10, Sweden takes control of the city, which is now located in Belarus.
- February 6 – The city of Albuquerque, New Mexico, is incorporated by governor Don Francisco Cuervo y Valdes as La Villa de Alburquerque in the Spanish colonial province of Santa Fe de Nuevo México in New Spain. Governor Cuervo sends a report on April 23 to the Spanish Crown and to New Spain's Governor, Francisco Fernández de la Cueva, 10th Duke of Alburquerque announcing that the new villa, consisting of 35 families and having a population of 252 adults, has been named in honor of the Duke.
- February 13 – Great Northern War – Battle of Fraustadt: Outnumbered more than 4 to 1 in infantry troops, and more than 2 to 1 overall, Swedish troops under the command of General Carl Gustaf Rehnskiöld defeat a larger force of 20,000 Russian and Saxon infantry and cavalry.
- March 21 – Mary Channing, who was pregnant at the time that she was convicted of the murder of her husband, is burned at the stake at Dorset, in front of a crowd of 10,000 onlookers.
- March 27 – Concluding that Emperor Iyasu I of Ethiopia has abdicated by retiring to a monastery, a council of high officials appoint Tekle Haymanot I Emperor of Ethiopia.
- March 31 – The last General Court (parliament) of the Principality of Catalonia ends, presided over by king Charles III, the Habsburg pretender to the throne of Spain.

=== April–June ===
- April 10 – The Battle of Grodno ends with a Swedish victory over Russian troops.
- April 27 – War of the Spanish Succession: After a siege of 14 days, a French and Spanish army fails to take control of Barcelona, which had been captured by Habsburg armies in 1705.
- May 12 – A total eclipse of the Sun takes place and is visible in most of Europe, with a path crossing modern-day Spain, France, Germany, Poland and Russia
- May 23 – War of the Spanish Succession – Battle of Ramillies: English, Dutch, German, Swiss and Scottish troops led by John Churchill, 1st Duke of Marlborough, defeat Franco-Bavarian forces in the Low Countries.
- June 9 – Frederick IV of Denmark-Norway sends the first two Protestant missionaries to India, dispatching Lutherans Heinrich Plütcshau and Bartholomeus Ziegenbalg to Denmark-Norway's colony in India, the Dansk Ostindien, based at Tharangambadi ("Tranquebar") in what is now the Tamil Nadu state.
- June 11 – In Tibet, Lha-bzang Khan, khan of the Khoshut, kills the regent and kidnaps the 6th Dalai Lama, Tsangyang Gyatso, and kills the Lama's regent.
- June 28 – War of the Spanish Succession: Troops dispatched from Portugal capture Madrid and proclaim the Habsburg dynasty's Archduke Charles of Austria to be the King Carlos III of Spain, after the Bourbon ruler, Philip V, has fled.
- June 29 – Flemish Jesuit missionary François Noël is welcomed in China by the Kangxi Emperor at the Forbidden City in Beijing, and discusses the Emperor's disdain over the disapproval of Jesuit accommodation of Confucian rites by the Roman Catholic Church.

=== July–September ===
- July 22 – The Treaty of Union between Scotland and England is agreed upon in London, for ratification by the national legislatures.
- August 4 – War of the Spanish Succession: The Spanish Bourbon armies of King Philip V retake Madrid from the Portuguese and Habsburg Austria troops that had entered the city in June.
- August 18 – King Louis XIV of France makes his last visit to Paris, and gets an update on the construction of the veterans' hospital at the Dome des Invalides, which he had commissioned more than 35 years earlier.
- September 7 – War of the Spanish Succession – Battle of Turin: Forces of Austria and Savoy defeat the French near what is now the Italian city of Torino.

=== October–December ===
- October 13
  - Augustus II, known as August der Starke (Augustus the Strong), Elector of Saxony, having ruled as King of Poland since 1706, signs the Treaty of Altranstädt (1706), renouncing all claims to the throne to settle his fight with Sweden during the Great Northern War.
  - Iyasu I, Emperor of Ethiopia since 1682, is assassinated on the island of Tana, on orders of his son, Tekle Haymanot I, who has ruled in Iyasu's place. After being crowned as the new Emperor, Tekle Haymanot is stabbed to death in 1708 on orders of Iyasu's brother, Tewoflos.
- October – Twinings founder, Thomas Twining, opens the first known tea room at 216 Strand, London, still open as of 2026.
- November 4 – The Parliament of Scotland votes, 116 to 83, to approve the merger of Scotland with England to form the Kingdom of Great Britain.
- November 6 – A British attempt to conquer the Canary Islands fails when a fleet of 12 Royal Navy warships, commanded by Admiral John Jennings is forced to retreat after being met by a heavy artillery attack while sailing into Santa Cruz Bay
- November 15 – Five months after having been deposed from his position as the Dalai Lama, Tsangyang Gyatso disappears while in exile in Qinghai and is presumed to have been murdered.
- November 28 – The royal wedding of Prussia takes place in Berlin between the 18-year-old Crown Prince Friedrich Wilhelm and his bride Sophia Dorothea of Hanover, the 19-year-old daughter of the future King George I of Great Britain.
- December 9 – João V becomes the new King of Portugal upon the death of his father, Dom Pedro II, and begins a reign of 43 years.
- December 14 – Spanish General Alexandre Maître, Marquis de Bay leads the successful capture of Alcántara from Portugal
- December 31 – François Martin, the first Governor General of French India (now part of India's union territory of Puducherry), retires after seven years and is replaced by Pierre Dulivier.

== Births ==
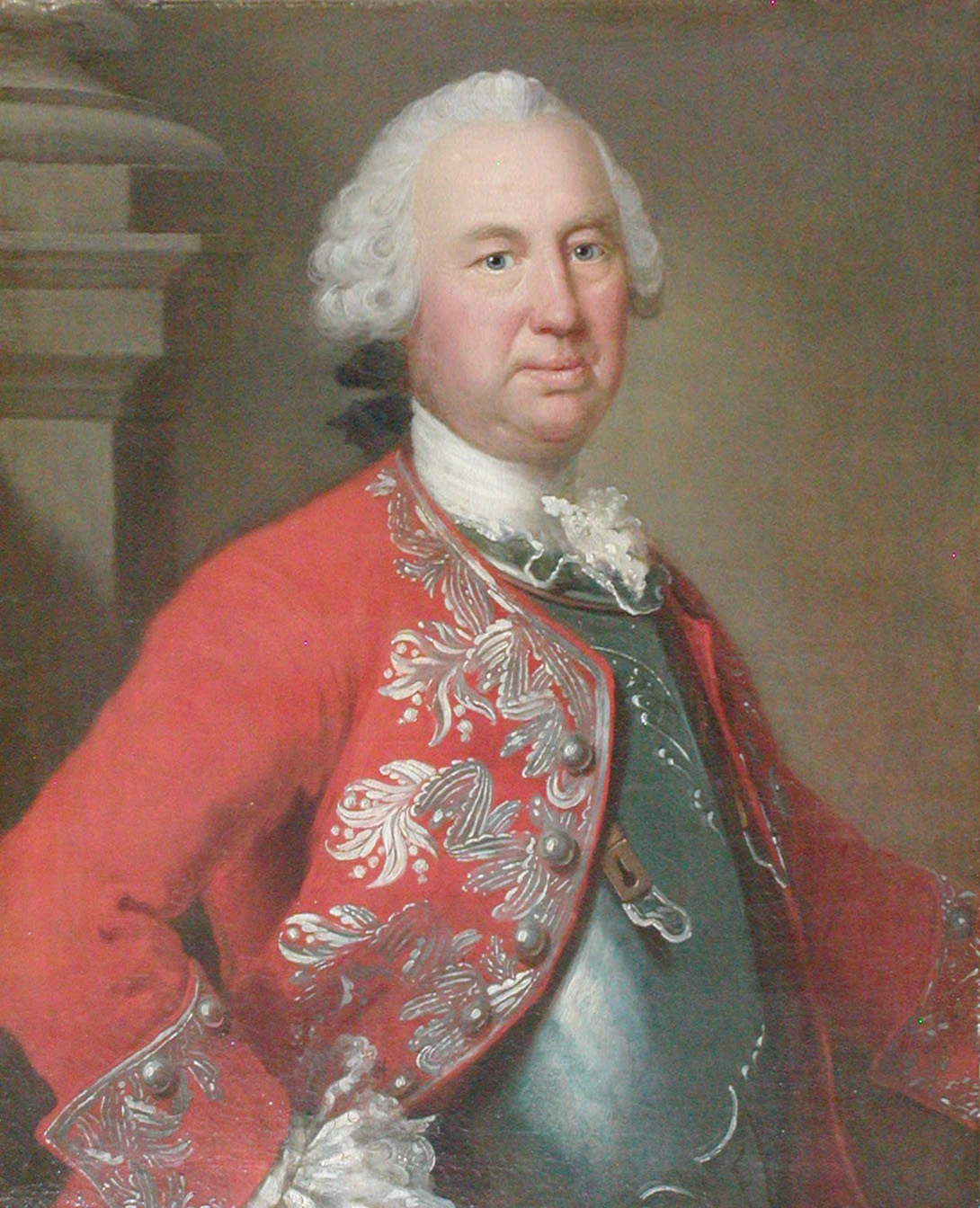
Lauritz de Thurah born 4 March

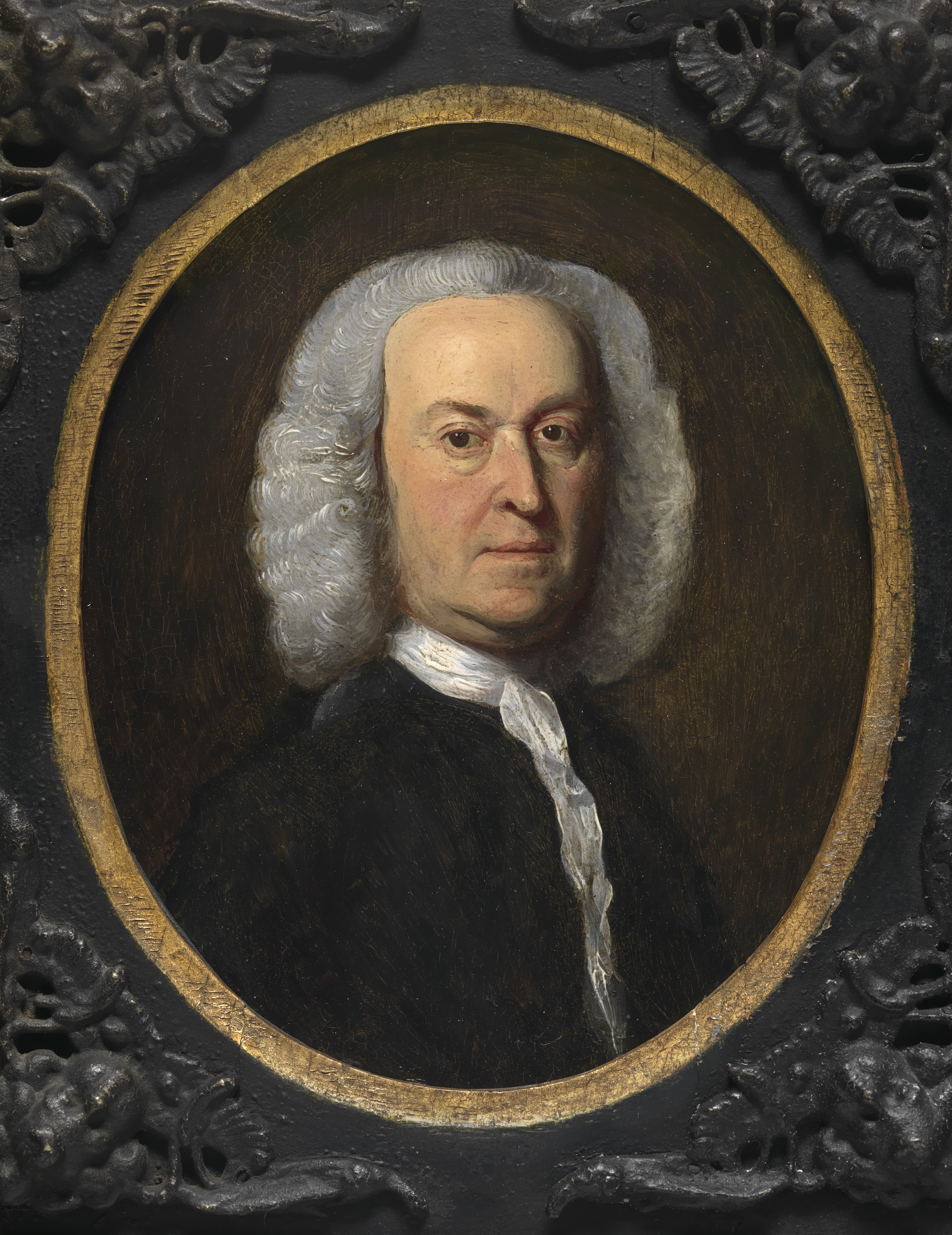
Andrew Oliver born 28 March

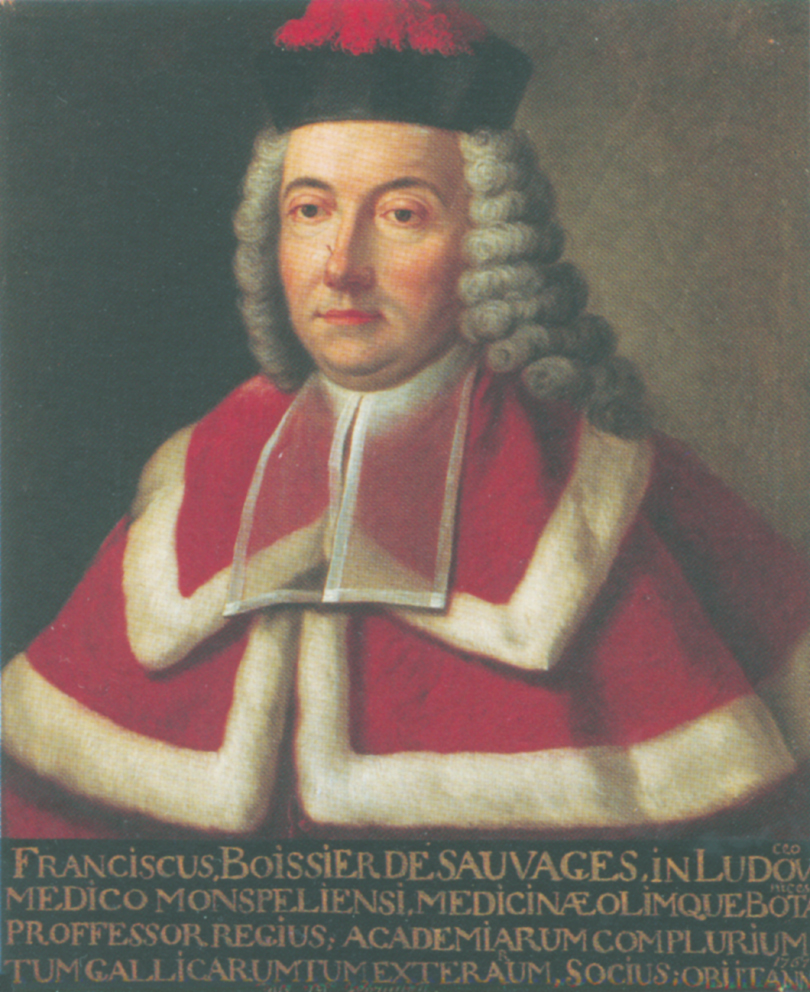
François Boissier de Sauvages de Lacroix born 12 May

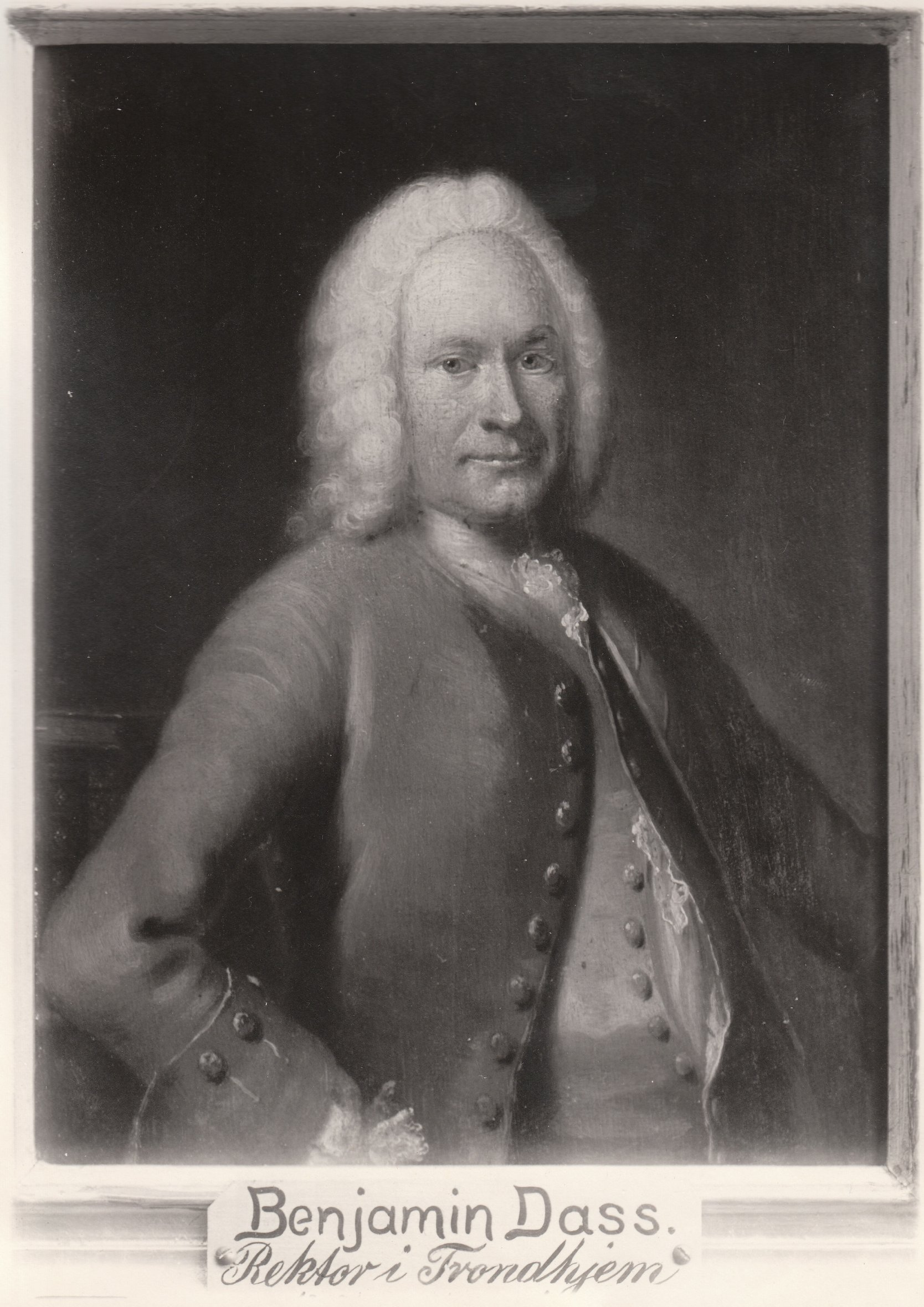
Benjamin Dass born 15 August

=== January–March ===
- January 1
  - Henry Howard, 10th Earl of Suffolk (d. 1745)
  - Nils Wallerius, Swedish physicist (d. 1764)
- January 3 – Johann Caspar Füssli, Swiss portrait painter and writer (d. 1782)
- January 7 – Johann Heinrich Zedler, German publisher (d. 1751)
- January 17
  - Benjamin Franklin, American inventor and Founding Father (d. 1790)
  - George Michael Moser, Swiss artist and enameller (d. 1783)
  - Richard Penn Sr., proprietary and titular governor of Pennsylvania and the counties of New Castle County (d. 1771)
- January 20 – Frederick Charles Augustus, Count of Lippe (d. 1781)
- January 26 – John Elder, American colonial pastor (d. 1792)
- January 28 – Shubal Stearns, American colonial evangelist and preacher during the Great Awakening (d. 1771)
- February 2 – Claude-Godefroy Coquart, Jesuit priest who probably arrived in Quebec in 1739 (d. 1765)
- February 8 – Luis de Córdova y Córdova, Spanish admiral (d. 1796)
- February 11 – Nils Rosén von Rosenstein, Swedish physician (d. 1773)
- February 12 – Johann Joseph Christian, German Baroque sculptor and woodcarver (d. 1777)
- February 17 – Robert Hampden-Trevor, 1st Viscount Hampden, British diplomat at The Hague and then joint Postmaster General (d. 1783)
- February 19 – John Hornyold, English Catholic bishop (d. 1778)
- February 20 – Phineas Stevens, distinguished officer noted for his defense of the Fort at Number 4 during a siege in April 1747 (d. 1756)
- February 26 – Jan Antonín Vocásek, Czech Baroque painter (d. 1757)
- February 28 – Philippe-François Bart, French naval officer who was Governor of Saint-Domingue during the Seven Years' War (d. 1784)
- March 1 – Sébastien Bigot de Morogues, French soldier, a sailor and military naval tactician (d. 1781)
- March 4 – Lauritz de Thurah, Danish architect and architectural writer (d. 1759)
- March 6 – Sir George Pocock, British admiral (d. 1792)
- March 7 – Johann Leonhard Dober, one of the two first missionaries of the Moravian Brethren in the West Indies in 1732 (d. 1766)
- March 12 – Johan Pasch, Swedish painter (d. 1769)
- March 13 – Johann Christoph Heilbronner, German mathematical historian (d. 1745)
- March 14 – Siegmund Jakob Baumgarten, German Protestant theologian (d. 1757)
- March 23 – Anna Maria Barbara Abesch, Swiss reverse glass painter and the daughter of Johann Peter Abesch (d. 1773)
- March 26 – Mather Byles, American clergyman active in British North America (d. 1788)
- March 28 – Andrew Oliver, merchant and public official in the province of Massachusetts Bay (d. 1774)
- March 30 – Tommaso Struzzieri, Roman Catholic prelate who served as Bishop of Todi (1775–1780) (d. 1780)

=== April–June ===
- April 2 – Johann Joseph Würth, Austrian silversmith of the late baroque period (d. 1767)
- April 6 – Louis de Cahusac, French playwright and librettist (d. 1759)
- April 18 – William Brattle, Attorney General of province of Massachusetts Bay as well as a physician (d. 1776)
- April 24 – Giovanni Battista Martini, Italian musician (d. 1784)
- April 29 – Pierre-Antoine Gourgaud, French actor (d. 1774)
- April 30 – Philipp Jakob Straub, Austrian sculptor (d. 1774)
- May 12 – François Boissier de Sauvages de Lacroix, French physician and botanist who was a native of Alès (d. 1767)
- May 17 – Andreas Felix von Oefele, German historian and librarian (d. 1780)
- May 20 – Seth Pomeroy, American gunsmith and soldier from Northampton (d. 1777)
- May 22 – Samuel Troilius, Archbishop of Uppsala in the Church of Sweden (d. 1764)
- June 10 – John Dollond, English optician (d. 1761)
- June 15 – Johann Joachim Kändler, German sculptor and important modeller of the Meissen porcelain manufactury (d. 1775)

=== July–September ===
- July 3 – Robert Lee, 4th Earl of Lichfield, English politician and peer (d. 1776)
- July 8 – John Hart, militia officer during King George's War and the French and Indian War (d. 1777)
- July 16 – Charles Godefroy de La Tour d'Auvergne, French nobleman (d. 1771)
- July 21 – Pierre Lyonnet, artist and engraver who became a naturalist (d. 1789)
- August 1 – Franz Sebald Unterberger, South Tyrolean painter in the Baroque style (d. 1776)
- August 4 – Frederick Charles, Duke of Schleswig-Holstein-Sonderburg-Plön (d. 1761)
- August 8 – Johan Augustin Mannerheim, Swedish nobleman and military leader (d. 1778)
- August 11 – Princess Marie Auguste of Thurn and Taxis, Regent of Württemberg (d. 1756)
- August 15 – Benjamin Dass, Norwegian educator and scholar who served as Rector of Trondheim Cathedral School (d. 1775)
- August 16 – Bakht Singh of Marwar, Indian Raja of the Rathore Clan (d. 1752)
- August 21 – Pierre Nicolas d'Incarville, French Jesuit, amateur botanist and missionary to China (d. 1757)
- August 24 – Sir John Evelyn, 2nd Baronet, British courtier and Whig politician (d. 1767)
- August 28 – Jan Bouman, Dutch architect (d. 1776)
- September 3 – Alonso Verdugo, 3rd Count of Torrepalma, Spanish count (d. 1767)
- September 8 – Antoine de Favray, French painter noted for his portraits of personalities of the Ottoman Empire (d. 1798)
- September 9 – Jean-Baptiste Barsalou, Canadian fur trader (d. 1776)
- September 12 – Léon Ménard, French lawyer and historian (d. 1767)
- September 21 – Polyxena of Hesse-Rotenburg, second wife of Charles Emmanuel III of Sardinia (d. 1735)
- September 22 – Barbara Regina Dietzsch, Bavarian painter and engraver (d. 1783)

=== October–December ===
- October 6
  - Princess Charlotte Amalie of Denmark, Danish princess (d. 1782)
  - Pieter Steyn, Grand Pensionary of Holland (d. 1772)
- October 11 – Nicolaes Geelvinck, mayor of Amsterdam (d. 1764)
- October 18 – Baldassare Galuppi, Venetian composer (d. 1785)
- November 2 – Francis Godolphin, 2nd Baron Godolphin, British peer and politician (d. 1785)
- November 6
  - Pierre Soubeyran, Swiss engraver (d. 1775)
  - William Tans'ur, English hymn-writer, composer and teacher of music (d. 1783)
- November 7 – Carlo Cecere, Italian composer of operas (d. 1761)
- November 8 – Johann Ulrich von Cramer, German judge and philosopher (d. 1772)
- November 11 – Frederick William II, Prince of Nassau-Siegen, last Prince of Nassau-Siegen from the Calvinist line (d. 1734)
- November 18 – Johann Friedrich Alexander, Prince of Wied, German ruler (d. 1791)
- November 22 – Charles Spencer, 3rd Duke of Marlborough (d. 1758)
- November 25 – Henry Dodwell, British religious controversialist and lawyer (d. 1784)
- December 17 – Émilie du Châtelet, French mathematician and physicist (d. 1749)
- December 23 – John Cornwallis, British politician (d. 1768)
- December 24 – Anna Sophie Charlotte of Brandenburg-Schwedt, German noblewoman and member of the House of Hohenzollern (d. 1751)
- December 25 – Maria Anna of Schwarzenberg, Margravine consort of Baden-Baden and Princess of Schwarzenberg by birth (d. 1755)
- December 31 – Elisabetta Maria Satellico, Italian Roman Catholic professed religious from the Poor Clares who served as her convent's abbess (d. 1745)
- date unknown
  - James Abercrombie, British general (d. 1781)
  - Sabina Aufenwerth, German potter (d. 1782)
  - Barbe de Nettine, politically influential Austrian Netherlands banker (d. 1775)

== Deaths ==
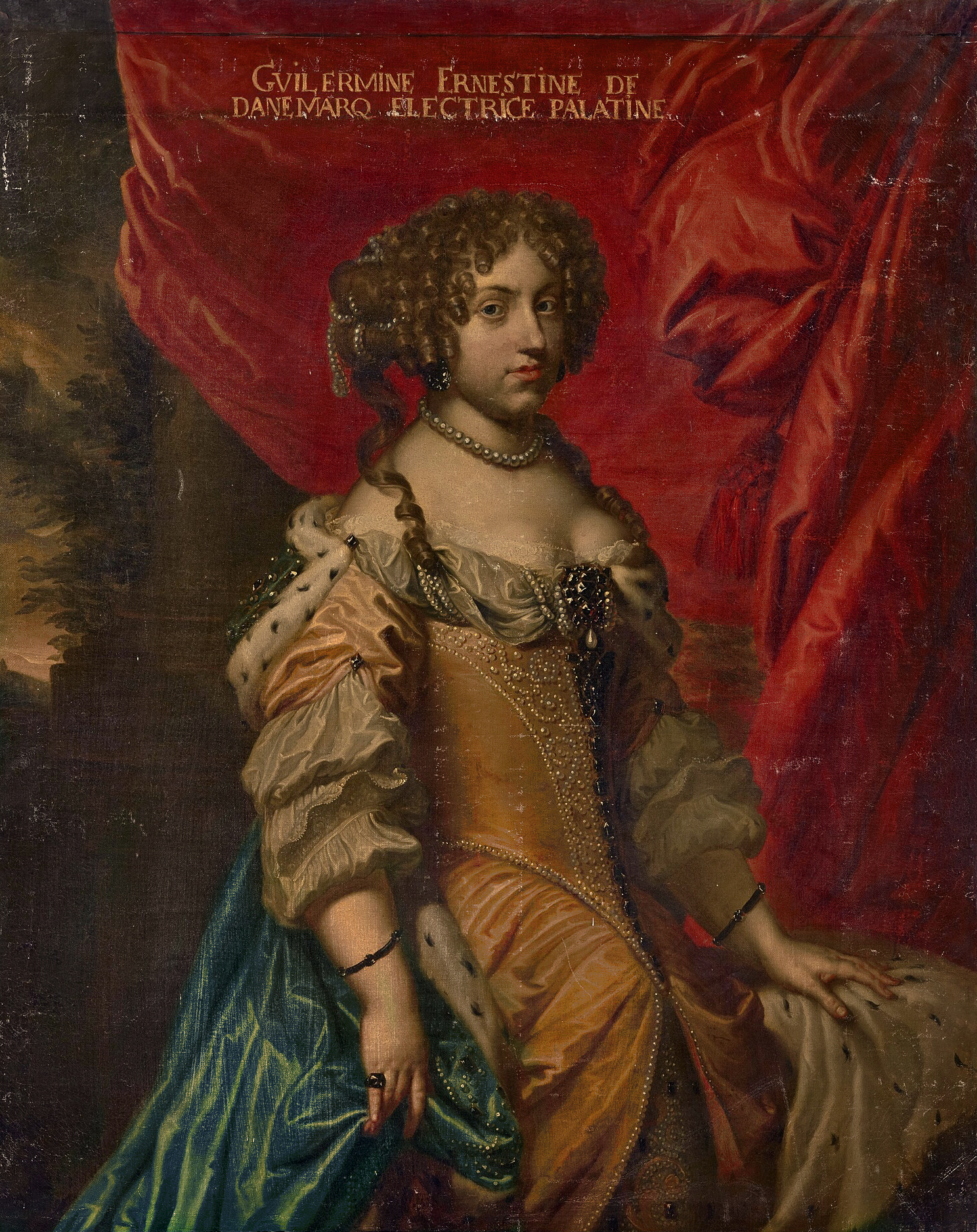
Princess Wilhelmine Ernestine of Denmark died 23 April

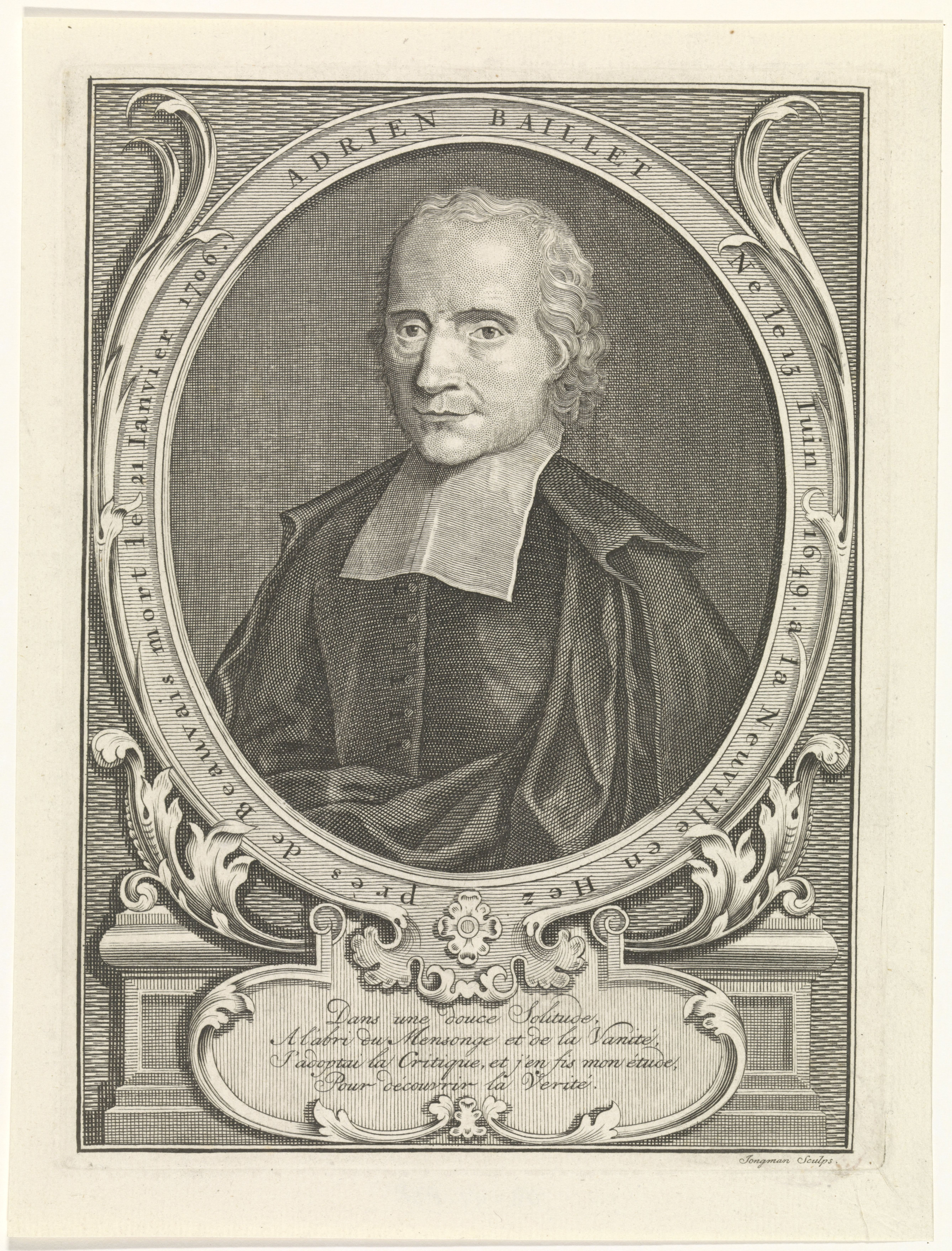
Adrien Baillet died 21 January

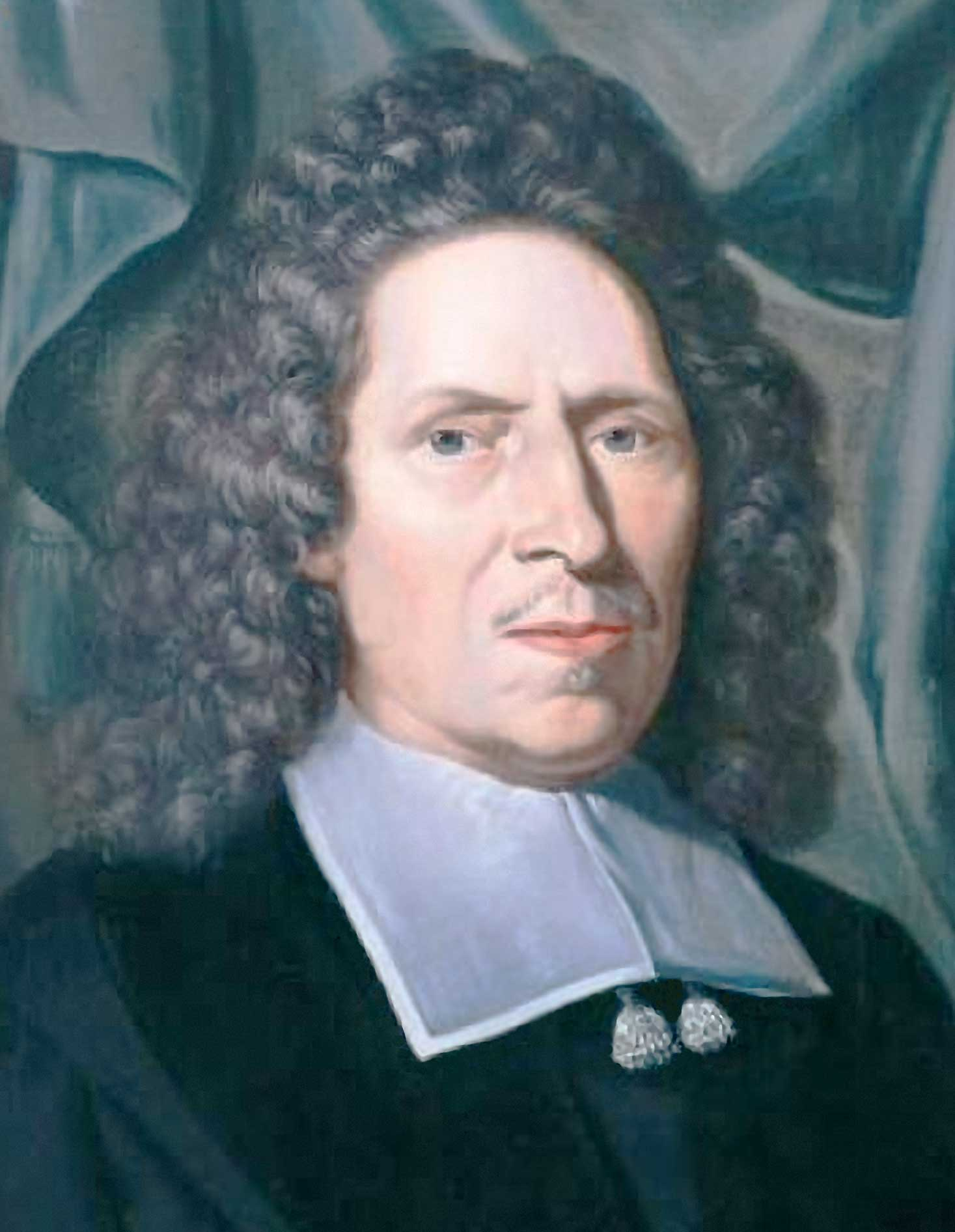
Petrus van Mastricht died 9 February

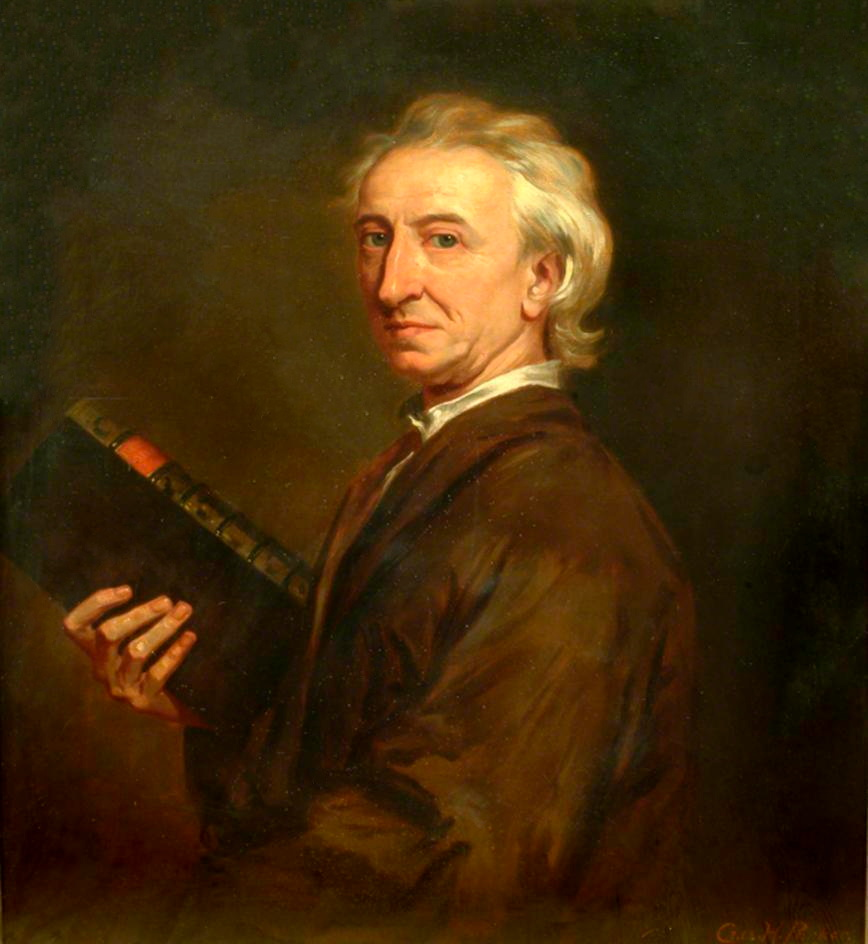
John Evelyn died 27 February

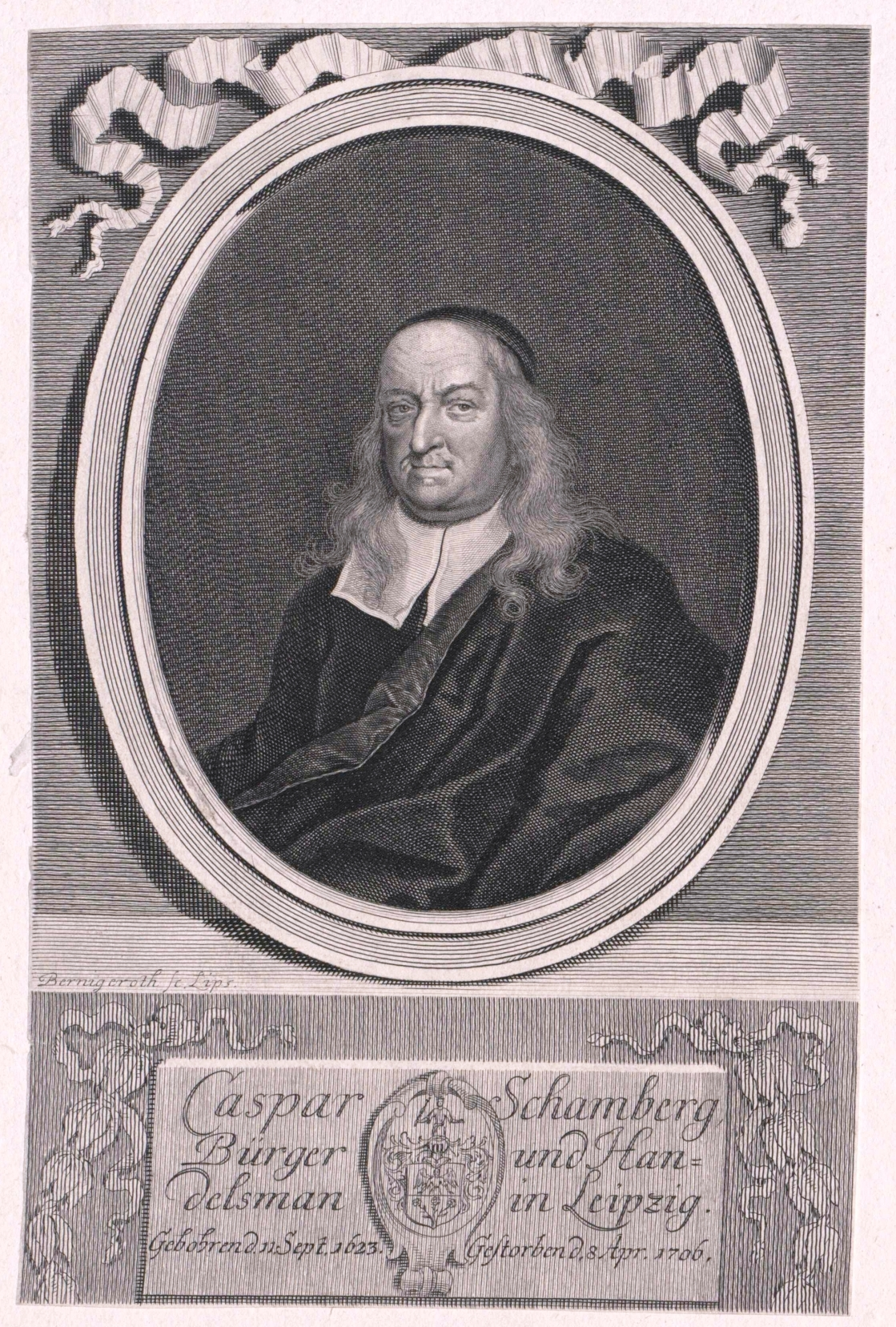
Caspar Schamberger died 8 April

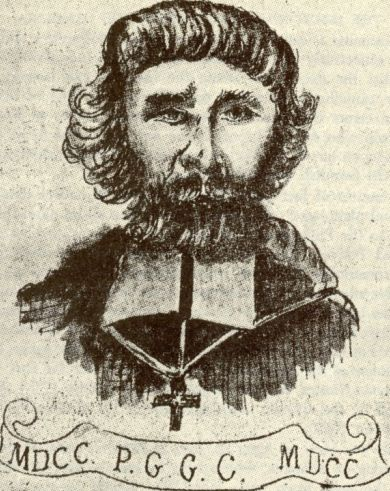
Georg Joseph Kamel died 2 May

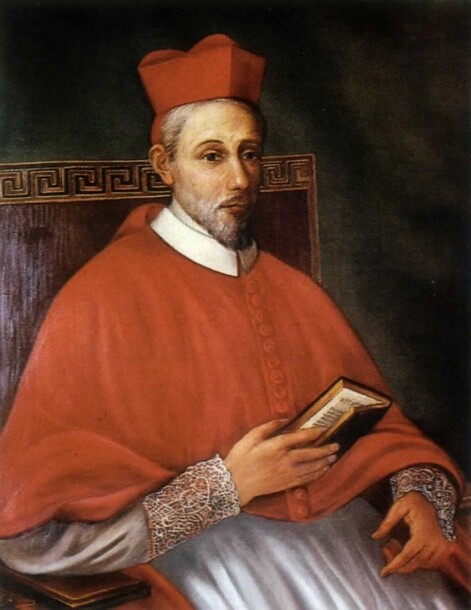
Marcantonio Barbarigo died 26 May

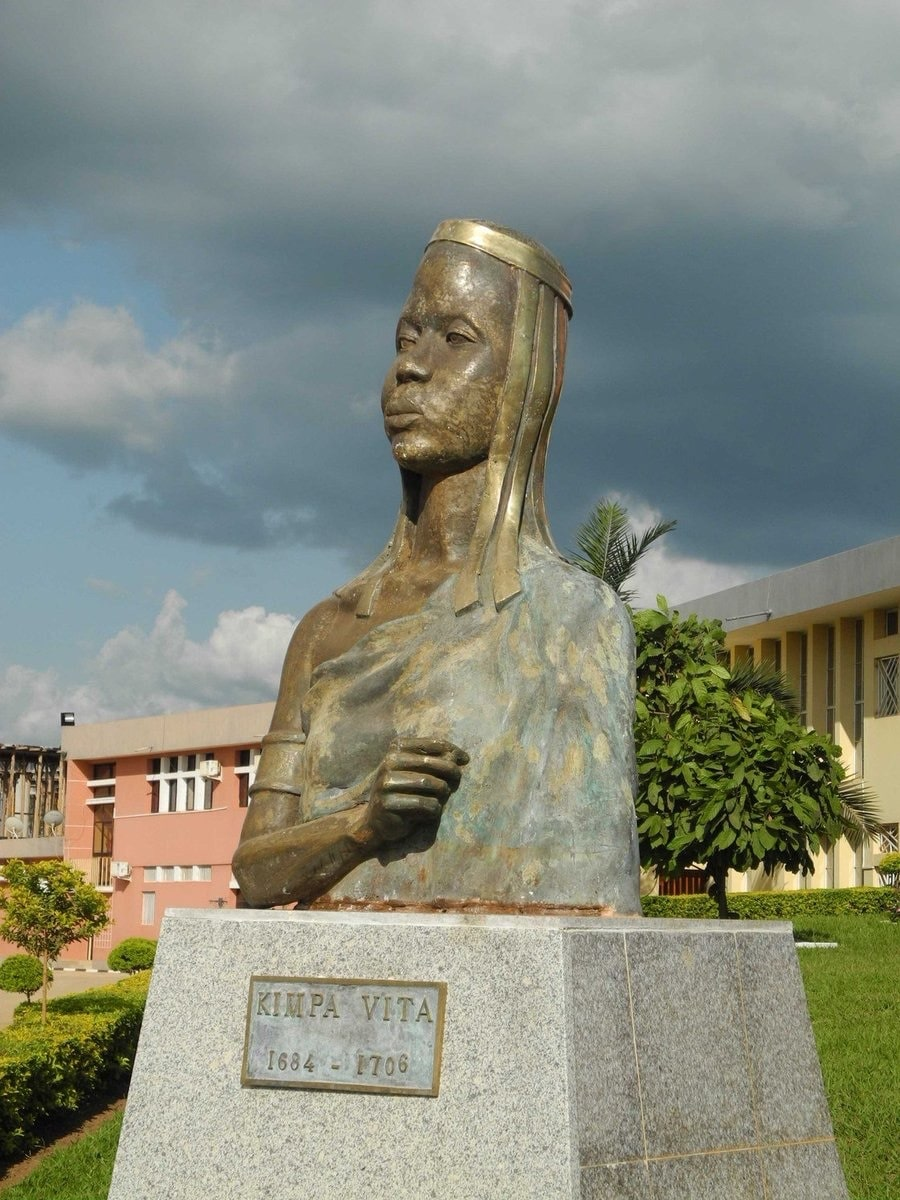
Kimpa Vita died 2 July

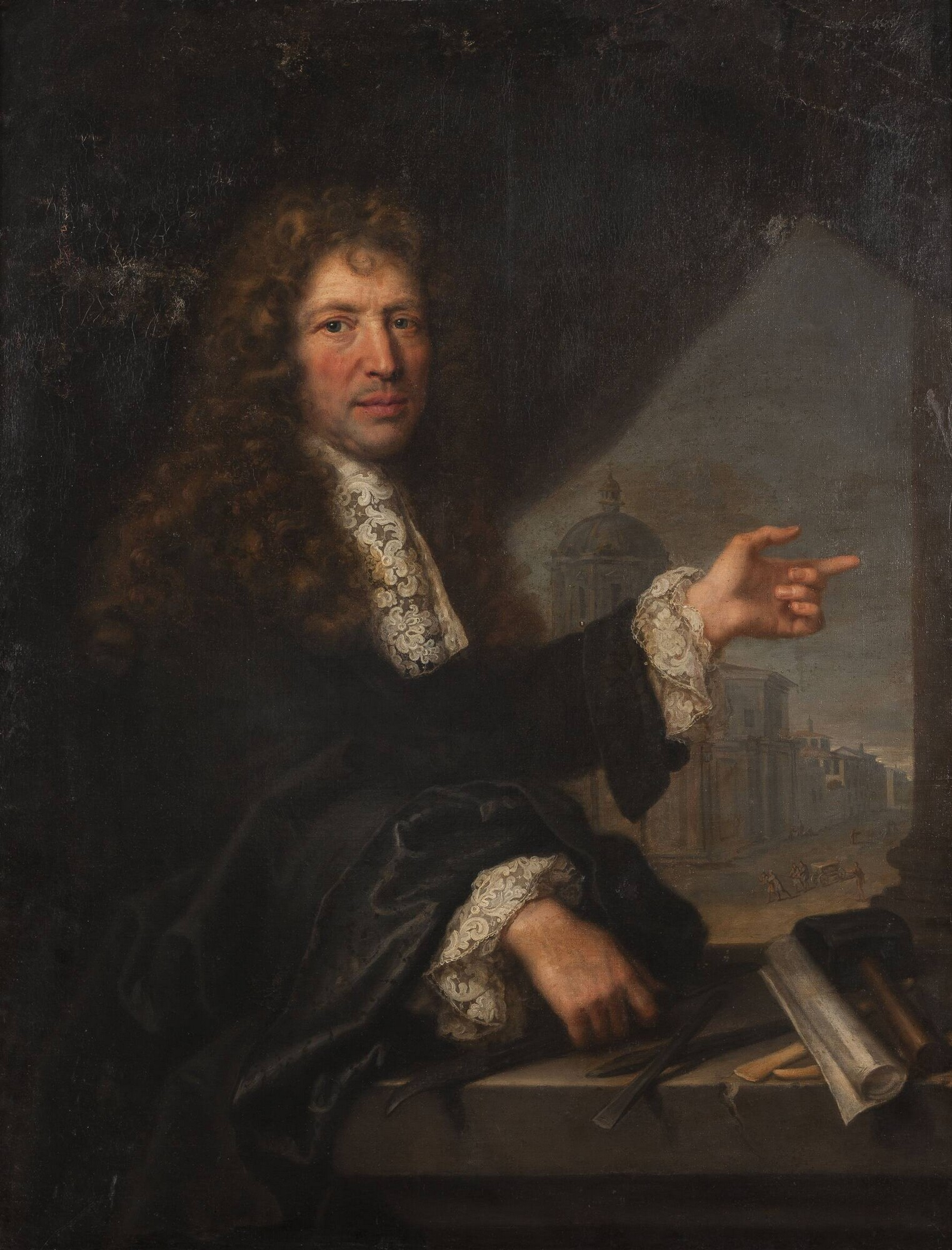
Thomas Regnaudin died 3 July

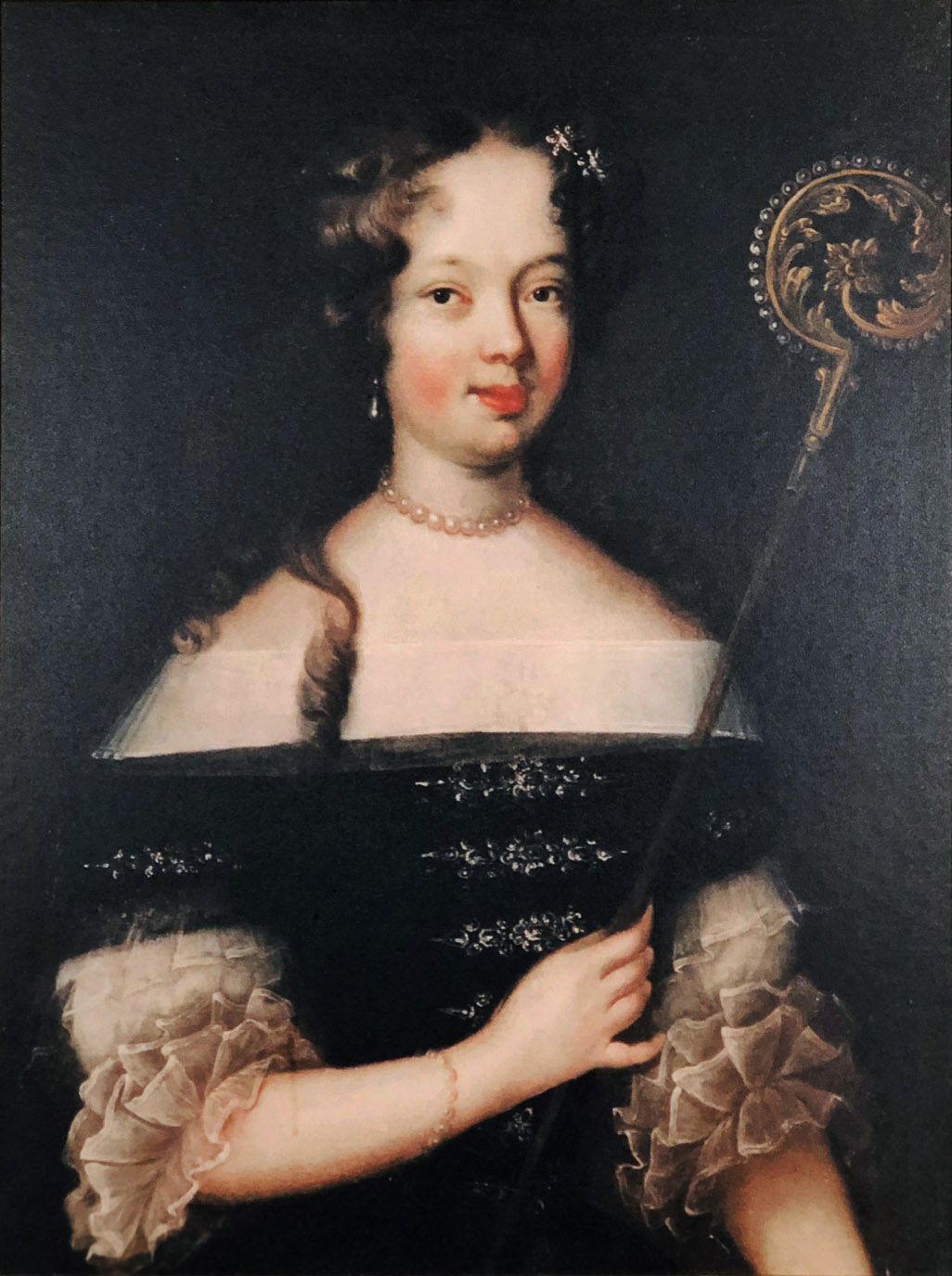
Princess Elisabeth Albertine of Anhalt-Dessau died 5 October

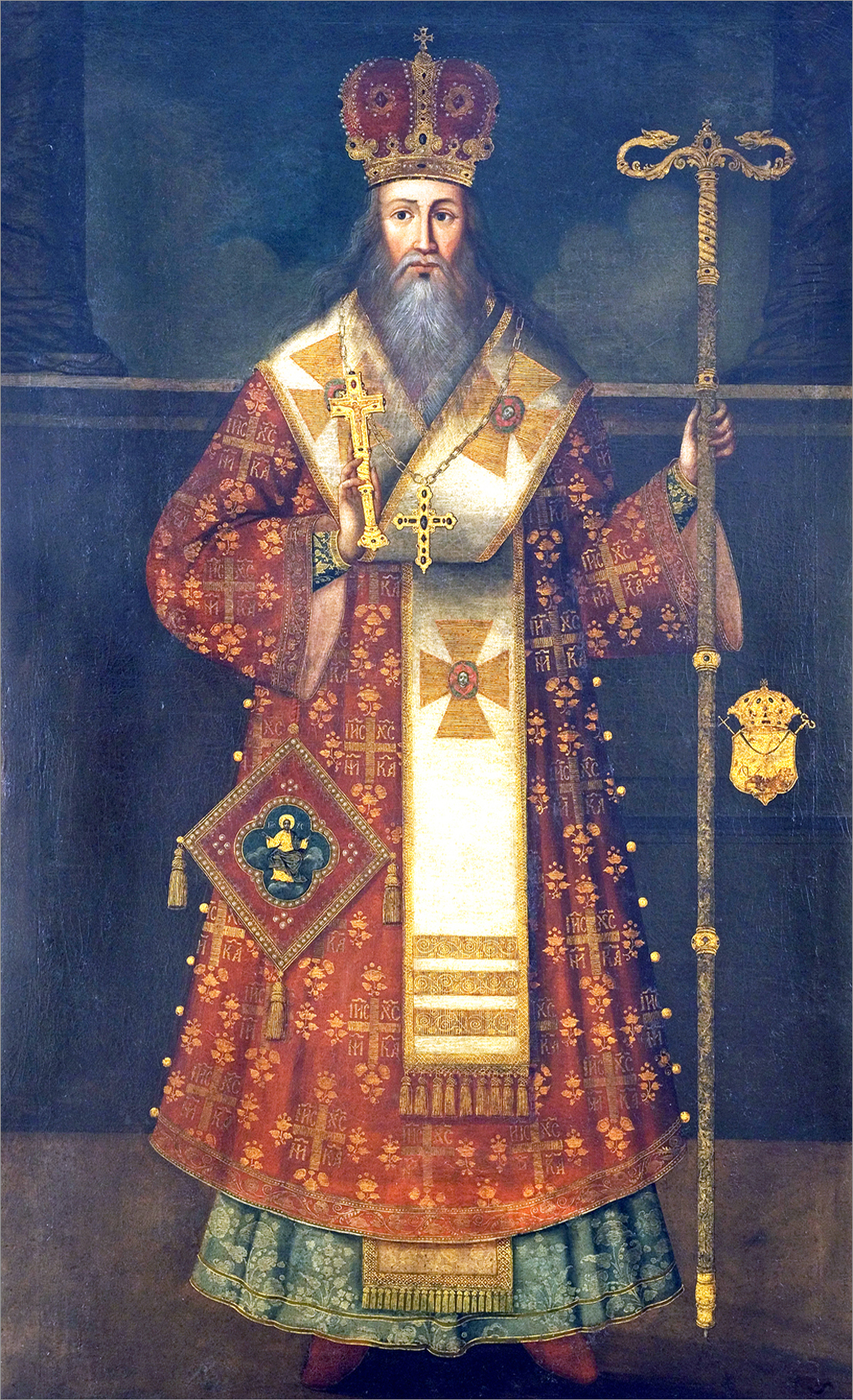
Arsenije III Crnojević died 27 October

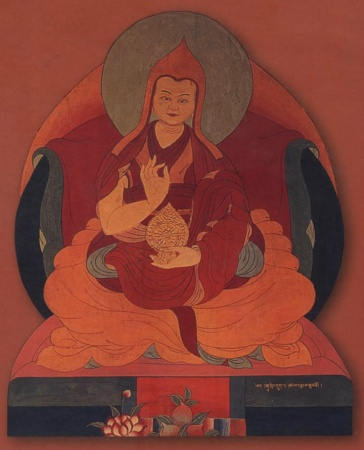
6th Dalai Lama died 15 November

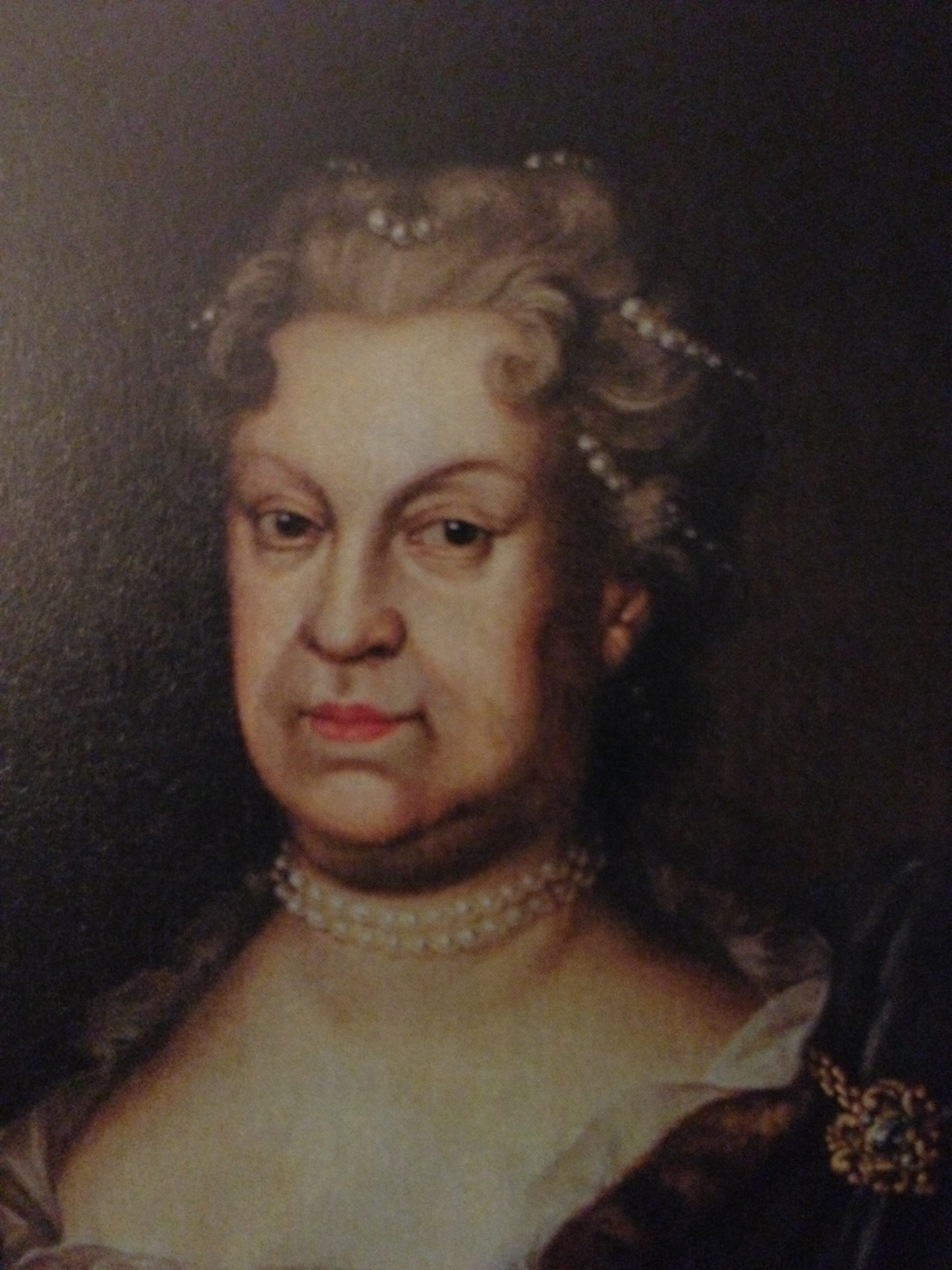
Emilie Juliane of Barby-Mühlingen died 3 December

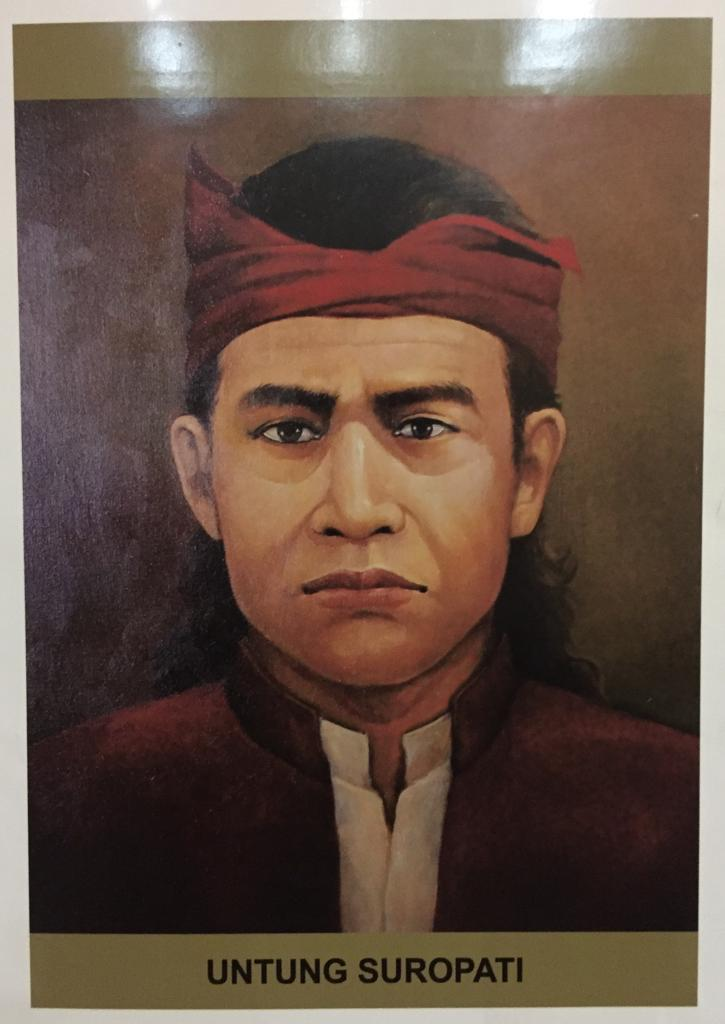
Untung Surapati died 5 December

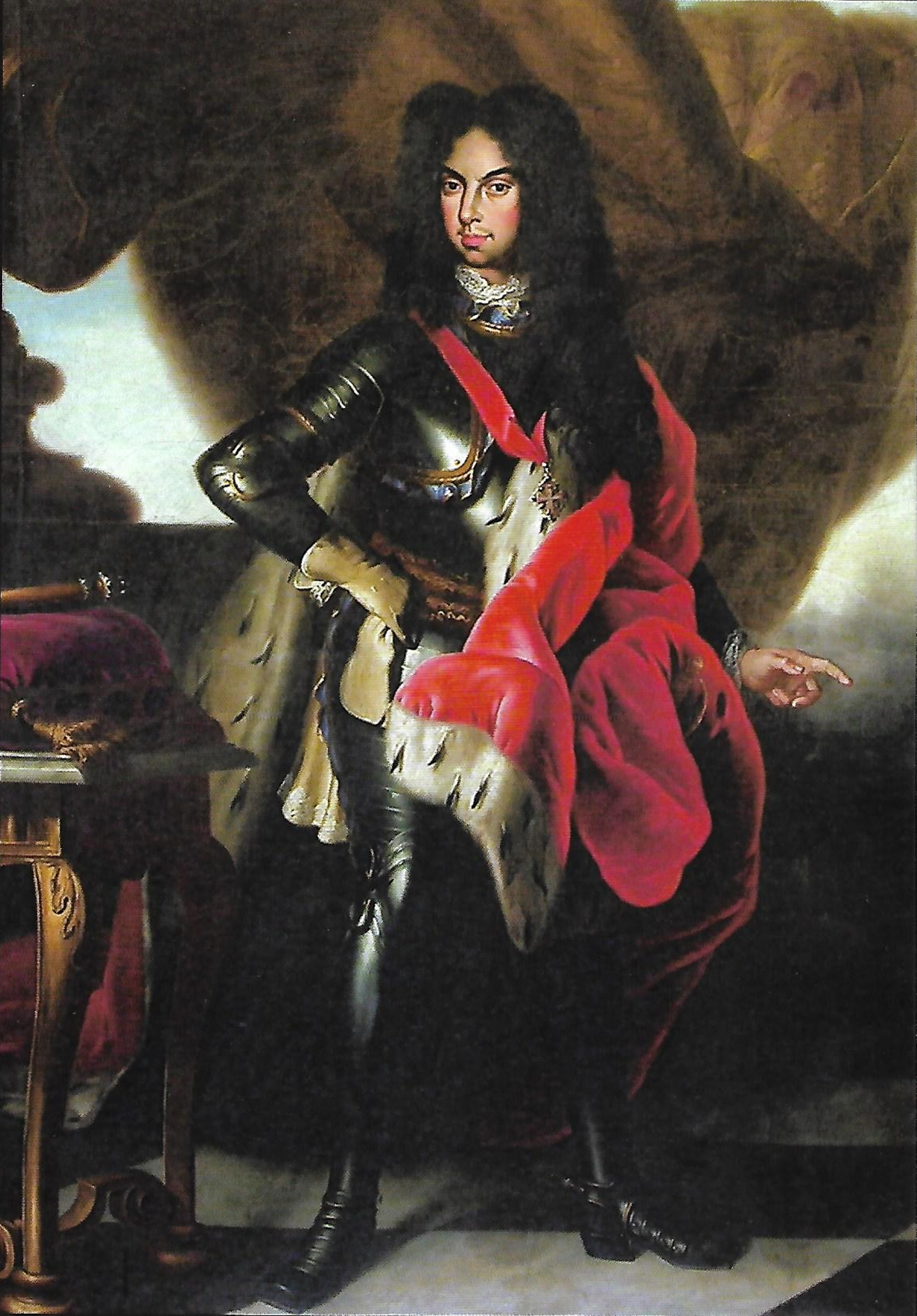
Peter II of Portugal died 9 December

=== January ===
- January 10 – Luisa Roldán, Spanish sculptor (b. 1652)
- January 17
  - Sir John Lowther, 2nd Baronet, of Whitehaven, English politician (b. 1642)
  - Philipp Peter Roos, German painter (b. 1657)
- January 21
  - Adrien Baillet, French scholar and critic (b. 1649)
  - Francesco Verde, Roman Catholic bishop (b. 1630)
- January 23 – Antoine Massoulié, French theologian (b. 1632)
- January 24 – Sir Francis Russell, 2nd Baronet, of Wytley, English politician (b. 1637)
- January 26 – Guillaume Poitevin, French composer (b. 1646)
- January 29 – Charles Sackville, 6th Earl of Dorset, English noble and politician (b. 1638)

=== February ===
- February 5 – Pierre du Cambout, French Catholic cardinal (b. 1636)
- February 7 – Didrik Muus, Norwegian painter (b. 1633)
- February 9 – Petrus van Mastricht, Reformed theologian from Cologne, Germany (b. 1630)
- February 11 – Maria Theresa van Thielen, Flemish painter (b. 1640)
- February 12
  - Fortunatus Hueber, German historian and theologian (b. 1639)
  - Balthasar Kindermann, German poet (b. 1636)
- February 27 – John Evelyn, English writer, gardener and diarist (b. 1620)

=== March ===
- March 1 – Heino Heinrich Graf von Flemming, German field marshal and Governor of Berlin (b. 1632)
- March 6 – García Felipe de Legazpi y Velasco Altamirano y Albornoz, Roman Catholic prelate, Bishop of Tlaxcala (b. 1643)
- March 9 – Johann Pachelbel, German composer, organist and teacher (b. 1653)
- March 30 – Nicolas Mathieu, French priest and music collector (b. 1640)
- March 31 – Sultan Muhammad Akbar, Mughal prince (b. 1657)

=== April ===
- April 2
  - Mihr-un-Nissa Begum, Mughal princess (b. 1661)
  - Ippolito Galantini, painter (b. 1627)
  - Giovanni Battista Volpati, Italian painter (b. 1633)
- April 3 – Giovanni Cinelli Calvoli, Italian writer (b. 1625)
- April 8 – Caspar Schamberger, German surgeon and merchant (b. 1623)
- April 10
  - Arthur Chichester, 3rd Earl of Donegall, English general (b. 1666)
  - Paul-Yves Pezron, French linguist (b. 1640)
- April 11 – Michel Barthélemy, French missionary (b. 1638)
- April 12 – Thomas Howard, 3rd Earl of Berkshire, English politician and Earl (b. 1619)
- April 20 – Hieronim Augustyn Lubomirski, Polish noble and politician (b. 1648)
- April 25 – Thomas Hinckley, last colonial governor of Plymouth Colony (b. 1618)
- April 27 – Bernhard I, Duke of Saxe-Meiningen (b. 1649)
- April 29 – John Quick, Anglican theologian (b. 1636)

=== May ===
- May 2 – Georg Joseph Kamel, Czech pharmacist, botanist and missionary (b. 1661)
- May 6 – Friedrich Christian von Plettenberg, Prince-Bishop of Münster (b. 1644)
- May 17 – Jean-Pierre Rivalz, French painter (b. 1625)
- May 19 – Mary Campion, British singer and dancer (b. 1687)
- May 23
  - James Bringfeild (b. 1656)
  - Prince Christian Charles of Schleswig-Holstein-Sonderburg-Plön-Norburg, Officer in the Brandenburg-Prussian army (b. 1674)
- May 26
  - Marcantonio Barbarigo, Italian Roman Catholic cardinal and venerable (b. 1640)
  - George Wenyeve, English Member of Parliament (b. 1627)

=== June ===
- June 6 – Francis Norreys, English Member of Parliament (b. 1665)
- June 15 – Ferdinand Bonaventura I, Count Harrach (b. 1636)
- June 20 – Ralph Grey, 4th Baron Grey of Werke, English Member of Parliament (b. 1661)
- June 21 – Jacques Testu de Belval, French writer (b. 1626)
- June 24 – Marie Gigault de Bellefonds, French writer (b. 1624)
- June 26 – Giacomo Farelli, Italian Painter (b. 1629)
- June 30 – Jacques Boyvin, French organist and composer (b. 1650)

=== July ===
- July 2 – Kimpa Vita, Kongo Empire guérisseuse and Congolese prophet (b. 1684)
- July 3 – Thomas Regnaudin, French sculptor (b. 1622)
- July 6 – Leonard Plukenet, English botanist (b. 1641)
- July 8 – James Converse, farmer, soldier and office holder in Massachusetts (b. 1645)
- July 9 – Pierre Le Moyne d'Iberville, French soldier, ship captain, explorer, founder of Louisiana (b. 1661)
- July 22 – Charles Wyndham, English politician (b. 1638)

=== August ===
- August 4 – Matthew Warren, English non-conformist minister (b. 1642)
- August 5 – Lord John Hay, British Army officer (b. 1668)
- August 6 – Jean-Baptiste du Hamel, French cleric and natural philosopher (b. 1624)
- August 10
  - Fyodor Alexeyevich Golovin, Russian diplomat (b. 1650)
  - Lorenzo Vaccaro, Italian artist (b. 1655)
- August 12 – Johann Deutschmann, German theologian (b. 1625)
- August 15 – Michael Willmann, German painter (b. 1630)
- August 18
  - Ascanio Luciano, Italian painter, ca.1621–1706 (b. 1621)
  - Luigi Omodei, Spanish Catholic cardinal (b. 1657)
- August 23
  - Edward Nott, British Colonial Governor of Virginia (b. 1657)
  - Tatyana Mikhailovna of Russia, Russian Tsarevna (b. 1636)
- August 26 – William Montagu, English politician and judge; (b. 1618)
- August 27 – Robert Bristow, English politician; (b. 1662)
- August 30 – Pietro Micca, Italian soldier (b. 1677)

=== September ===
- September 1 – Cornelis de Man, Dutch painter (b. 1621)
- September 9 – Ferdinand de Marsin, Marshal of France (b. 1656)
- September 16 – Matthias Petersen, sea captain and whaler from the North Frisian island of Föhr (b. 1632)
- September 24 – John Arundell, 3rd Baron Arundell of Trerice, English peer (b. 1649)
- September 26 – Onofrio Gabrielli, Italian painter (b. 1619)
- September 28 – Alexandre Lambert de Soyrier, bishop (b. 1632)

=== October ===
- October 1 – Richard Lewis, Member of Parliament (b. 1627)
- October 5 – Princess Elisabeth Albertine of Anhalt-Dessau, princess-Abbess of Herford (b. 1665)
- October 6
  - Ambrogio Besozzi, Italian painter (b. 1648)
  - Sámuel Kálnoky, Chancellor of Transylvania (b. 1640)
- October 8 – Giuseppe Agnelli, Italian theologian (b. 1621)
- October 10 – Archibald Hope, Lord Rankeillor, Scottish judge (b. 1639)
- October 11 – Pedro de Ardanaz, Spanish composer (b. 1638)
- October 13 – Iyasu I, emperor of Ethiopia (b. 1654)
- October 17 – William Jones, English lawyer, Deputy Governor of the Colony of Connecticut (b. 1624)
- October 20 – Adrienne Du Vivier, French colonist (b. 1626)
- October 26 – Andreas Werckmeister, German organist, music theorist and composer (b. 1645)
- October 27 – Arsenije III Crnojević, Serbian archbishop (b. 1633)
- October 31 – Sir Thomas Dyke, 1st Baronet, English politician (b. 1650)

=== November ===
- November 9 – Peter Mews, English Royalist theologian and bishop (b. 1619)
- November 15 – Tsangyang Gyatso, 6th Dalai Lama (b. 1683)
- November 16
  - Godfried Schalcken, painter from the Northern Netherlands (b. 1643)
  - Edward Thache, wealthy plantation owner in Jamaica (b. 1659)
  - Cornelis Evertsen the Youngest, Dutch admiral (b. 1642)
- November 17 – Edward Mansel, English politician (b. 1637)
- November 18 – Sir William Thomas, 1st Baronet, Member of the English Parliament (b. 1641)
- November 20
  - Robert Echlin, Member of the Irish Parliament (b. 1674)
  - Sir Thomas Roberts, 4th Baronet, English politician (b. 1658)
- November 25 – Jacques Le Ber, French merchant (b. 1633)

=== December ===
- December 2 – Johann Georg Ahle, German composer, poet, organist, music theorist (b. 1651)
- December 3 – Emilie Juliane of Barby-Mühlingen, German countess and hymn writer (b. 1637)
- December 5 – Untung Surapati, Balinese slave-turned-warlord (b. 1660)
- December 8 – Abraham Nicolas Amelot de la Houssaye, French historian (b. 1634)
- December 9 – King Peter II of Portugal, King of Portugal (b. 1648)
- December 12
  - Christian Louis, Count of Waldeck, (b. 1635)
  - Robert Pike, English colonist (b. 1616)
- December 19
  - Maximilian Henry, Count of Wied-Runkel (b. 1681)
  - Sir Thomas Hussey, 2nd Baronet, English politician (b. 1639)
  - John Mountstephen, English politician; (b. 1644)
- December 25
  - Nicolas de Plattemontagne, French painter (b. 1631)
  - Franz Engelbert Barbo von Waxenstein, Austrian priest (b. 1664)
- December 28 – Pierre Bayle, French philosopher and writer (b. 1647)
- December 31 – François Martin, French colonial governor (b. 1634)

=== Date unknown ===
- Jeanne Dumée, French astronomer (b. 1660)
- Byerley Turk, thoroughbred stallion (b. c. 1684)
