= Michel Le Quien =

French historian and theologian

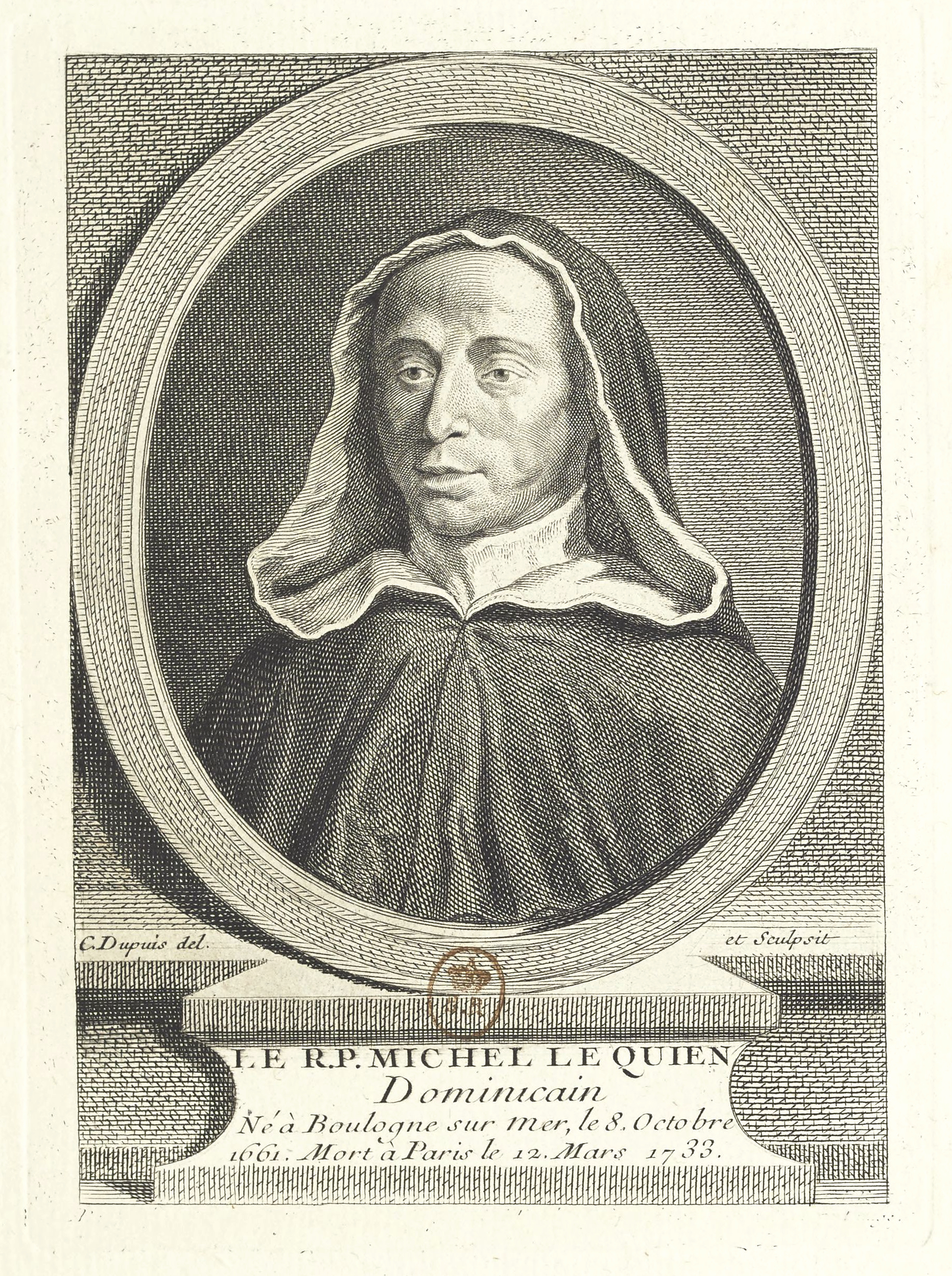
Michel Le Quien

Michel Le Quien (8 October 1661, Boulogne-sur-Mer – 12 March 1733, Paris) was a French historian and theologian.

== Biography ==
Le Quien studied at Plessis College, Paris, and at twenty entered the Dominican convent in Faubourg Saint-Germain, where he made his profession in 1682.

Excepting occasional short absences, Le Quien never left Paris. At the time of his death he was librarian of the convent in Rue Saint-Honoré, a position which he had filled almost all his life, lending assistance to those who sought information on theology and ecclesiastical antiquity. Under the supervision of Jacques Marsollier he mastered the classical languages, Arabic and Hebrew, to the detriment, it seems, of his mother tongue.

== Works ==
His chief works, in chronological order, are:

- Défense du texte hébreu et de la version vulgate (Paris, 1690), reprinted in Migne's Scripturae Sacrae Cursus, III (Paris 1861), 1525–84. It is an answer to L'antiquité des temps rétablie by the Cistercian Paul Pezron (1638–1706), who took the text of the Septuagint as sole basis for his chronology. Pezron replied, and was again answered by Le Quien.
- Johannis Damasceni opera omnia, Greek text with Latin translation (2 vols. fol., Paris, 1712), republished in Migne's Patrologia Graeca volumes 94–96. To this fundamental edition, Le Quien added a number of dissertations. A third volume, which was to have contained other works of John of Damascus and various studies on him, was never completed.
- Panoplia contra schisma Graecorum, under the pseudonym of Stephanus de Altimura Ponticencis (Paris, 1718), a response to the Peri arches tou Papa of Patriarch Nectarius of Jerusalem, arguing for the primacy of the pope.
- La nullité des ordinations anglicanes (2 vols., Paris, 1725), and La nullité des ordinationes anglicanes démontrée de nouveau (2 vols., Paris, 1730), against Pierre François le Courayer's apology for Anglican Orders.
- Various articles on archaeology and ecclesiastical history, published by Desmolets (Paris, 1726–1731).
- Oriens christianus in quatuor patriarchatus digestus, in quo exhibentur Ecclesiae patriarchae caeterique praesules totius Orientis, published posthumously (3 vols., Paris, 1740). Le Quien contemplated issuing this work as early as 1722, and had made a contract with the printer Simart (Revue de l'Orient latin, 1894, II, 190). In editing it, he used the notes of the Benedictine Abel-Louis de Sainte-Marthe, who had projected an Orbis Christianus, and had obligingly handed him over his notes on the Orient and Africa. The Oriens Christianus, as projected by Le Quien, was to comprise not only the hierarchy of the four Greek and Latin patriarchates of Constantinople, Alexandria, Antioch and Jerusalem, and that of the Jacobite, Melkite, Nestorian, Maronite and Armenian patriarchates, but also the Greek and Latin texts of the various Notitiae episcopatuum, a catalogue of the Eastern and African monasteries, and also the hierarchy of the African Church. The last three parts of this gigantic project were set aside by Le Quien's literary heirs. His notes on Christian Africa and its monasteries have never been used in their entirety.
- Abrégé de l'histoire de Boulogne-sur-Mer et ses comtes in Desmolets, Mémoires de littérature, X (Paris, 1749), 36–112.

== Sources ==
- Quetif and Jacques Échard, Scriptores ordinis prædicatorum recensiti, notisque historicis illustrati ad annum 1700 auctoribus, II, SOS; Journal des Savants, ci
- Michaud, Biogr. universelle, XXIV, 241
- Hurter, Hugo von, Nomenclator, II, 1064-6
- Streber in Kirchenlexikon
- Zockler in Realencykl. fur prot. Theol., s. v. S. Vailhé
