= Nicolas Mathieu =

Nicolas Mathieu may refer to:

- Nicolas Mathieu (collector), 17th-century music collector and Catholic priest
- Nicolas Mathieu (writer), French writer
