= Charles Leslie (writer) =

Barbadian writer

Charles Leslie was a Barbadian writer who wrote about the history of Jamaica.

Leslie was married to Rebecca Tirres on 20 July 1710, Saint Philip, Barbados.

His book, A New and Exact History of Jamaica, was published in Edinburgh, Scotland, in 1739. Leslie, while researching on Jamaica, had met the family of Edward Thache or "Blackbeard the Pirate." His family's wealth and affluence surprised Charles Leslie in 1739 who wrote that Blackbeard "was born in Jamaica of very creditable Parents; his Mother [Lucretia Thache, died in 1743] is alive in Spanish Town to this Day, and his Brother [Cox Thache, died in 1737] is at present the Captain of the Train of Artillery."
