= Adrien Baillet =

French scholar and critic (1649–1706)

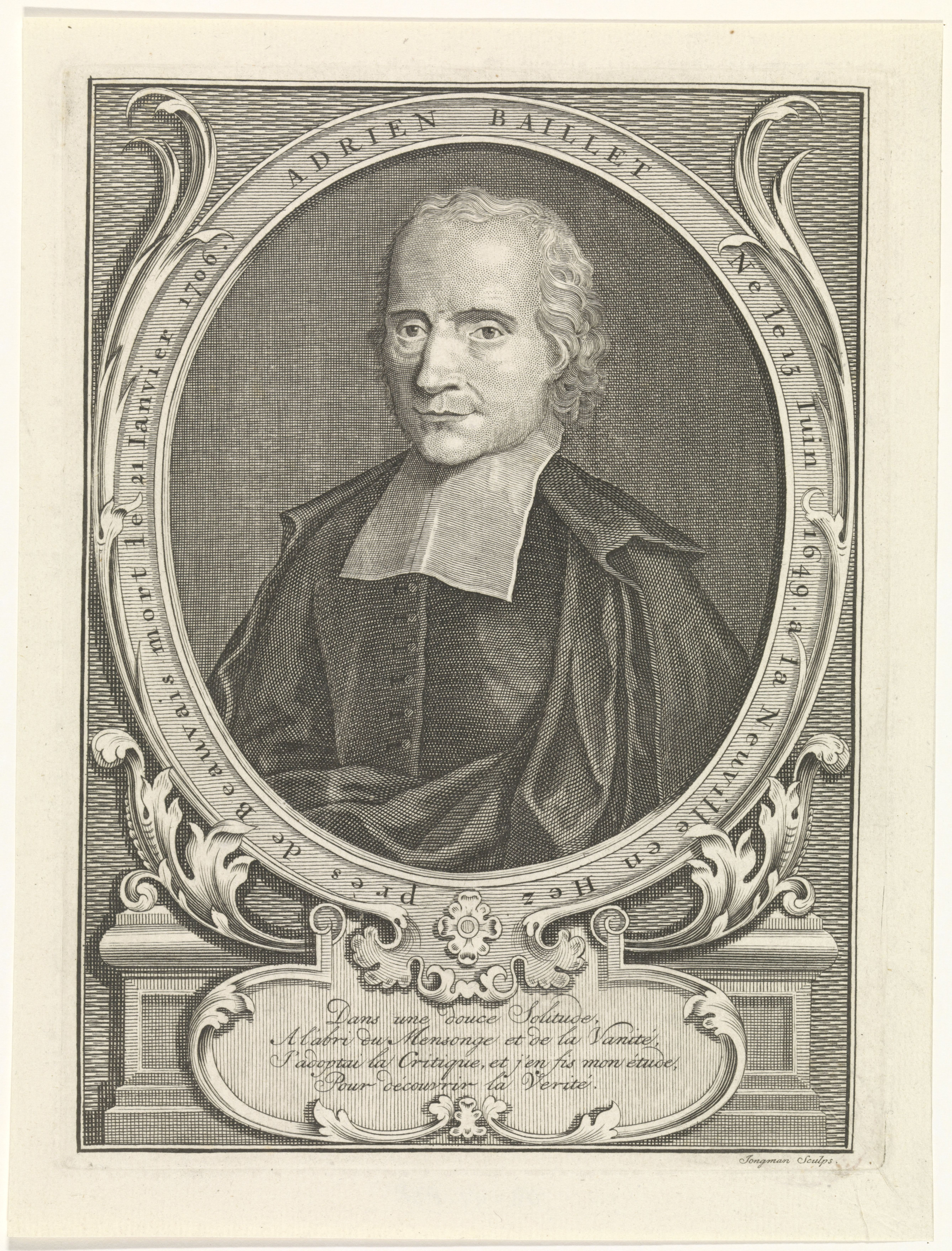
- Adrien Baillet, gravure, postuum (1715)
- Born: 13 June 1649; Neuville, France
- Died: 21 January 1706 (aged 56)
- Occupations: Scholar, critic, biographer

Academic work
- Notable works: Jugemens des savans sur les principaux ouvrages des auteurs

Adrien Baillet (13 June 1649 – 21 January 1706) was a French scholar and critic. He is now best known as a biographer of René Descartes.

== Life ==
He was born in the village of Neuville near Beauvais, in Picardy. His parents could only afford to send him to a small school in the village, but he picked up some Latin from the friars of a neighbouring convent, who brought him under the notice of the bishop of Beauvais. By his kindness Baillet received a thorough education at the theological seminary, and was afterwards appointed to a post as teacher in the college of Beauvais. In 1676 he was ordained priest and was presented to a small vicarage.

He accepted in 1680 the appointment of librarian to Chrétien-François I de Lamoignon, advocate-general to the parlement of Paris. He made a catalogue raisonné (in 35 vols.) of its library, all written with his own hand.

The remainder of his life was spent in incessant, unremitting labour; so keen was his devotion to study that he allowed himself only five hours a day for rest.

With regard to René Descartes, he is popularly said to have recorded in his biography the three dreams leading up to the Cartesian Cogito.

== Works ==
Of his numerous works the following are the most conspicuous:

1. Histoire de Hollande depuis la trève de ióop Jusqu’d 1690 (4 vols. 1693), a continuation of Grotius, and published under the name of La Neuville
2. Les Vies des saints (4 vols. 1701)
3. Des Satires personnelles, traité historique et critique de celles qui portent le litre d’Anti (2 vols. 1689)
4. La vie de monsieur Descartes (2 vols. 1691; modern edition in one volume: La vie de monsieur Descartes, Paris: Éditions des Malassis, 2012)
5. La vie de mr. Des-Cartes. Réduite en abregé (1692; modern edition: Vie de Monsieur Descartes, Paris, La Table Ronde, 1992)
6. Auteurs déguisés sous des noms étrangers, empruntes, &c. (1690)
7. Jugemens des savans sur les principaux ouvrages des auteurs (9 vols. 1685—1686).

The last is the most celebrated and useful of all his works. At the time of his death he was engaged on a Dictionnaire universelle ecclésiastique. The praise bestowed on the Jansenists in the Jugemens des savans brought down on Baillet the hatred of the Jesuits, and his Vie des saints, in which he brought his critical mind to bear on the question of miracles, caused some scandal. His Vie de Descartes is a mine of information on the philosopher and his work, derived from numerous unimpeachable authorities.
