= Johann Christoph Heilbronner =

German mathematical historian and theologian

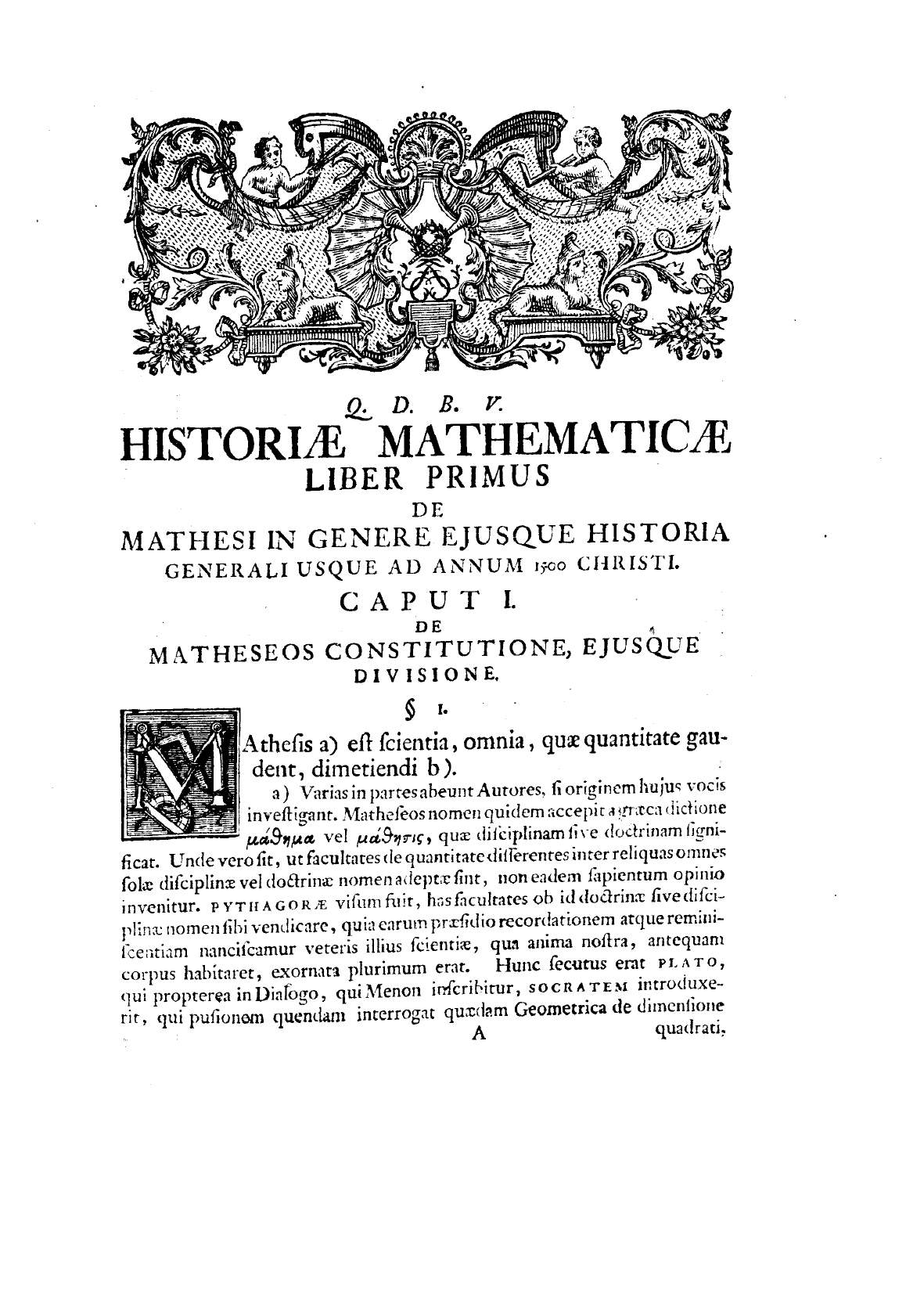
Historia matheseos universae, 1742

Johann Christoph Heilbronner (13 March 1706, in Ulm – 17 January 1745 (or c.1747), in Leipzig) was a German mathematical historian (Mathematikhistoriker) and theologian.

== Literary works ==
- Versuch einer Geschichte der Mathematik and Arithmetik (), 1739
- Historia matheseos universae a mundo condito ad seculum post Chr. Nat. XVI (or Historia matheseos universae; ), 1742

These two books are the first books that named and used the phrase "mathematical history (German: Geschichte der Mathematik, Latin: Historia matheseos)".
