= Petrus van Mastricht =

German reformed theologian

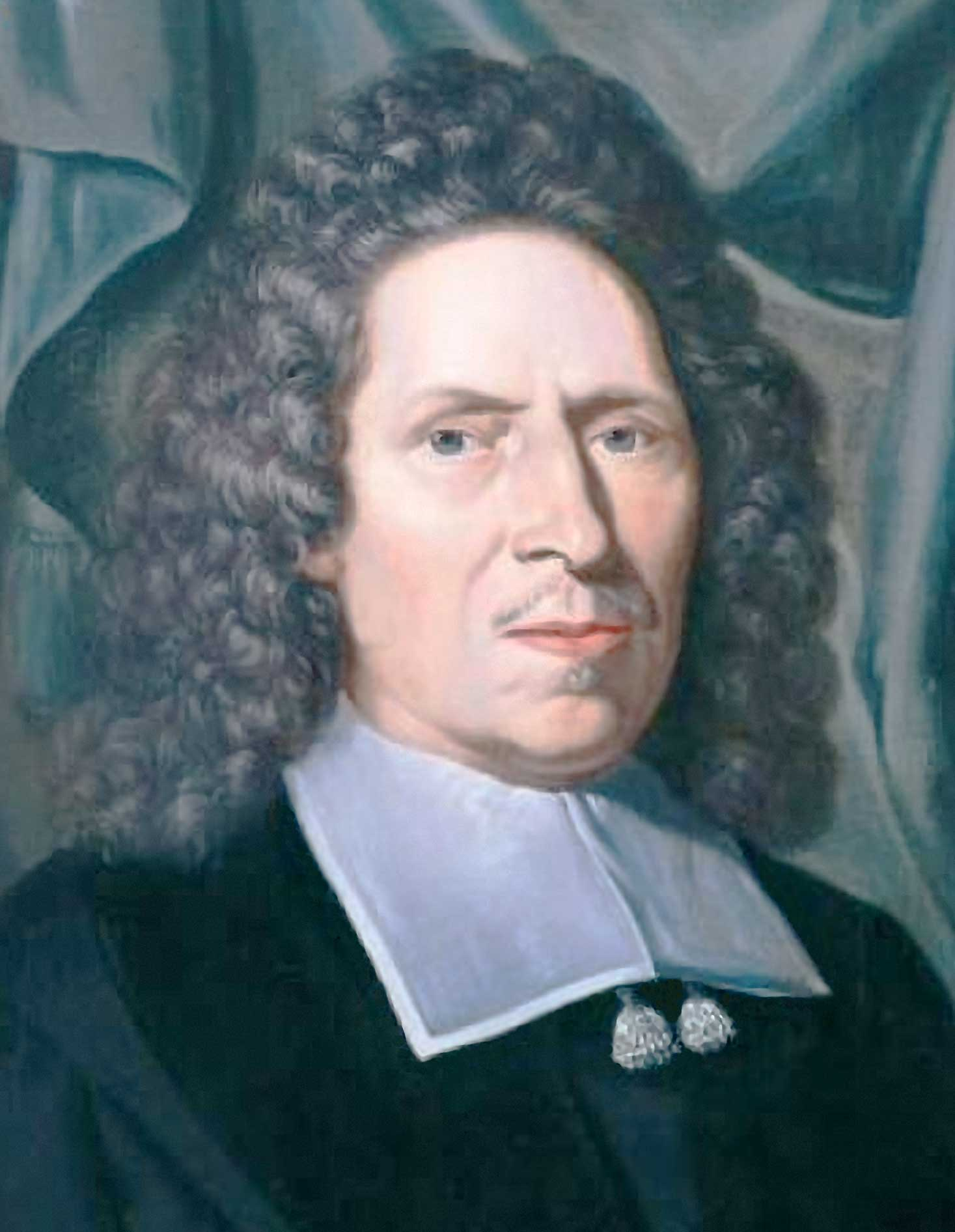

Petrus (or Peter or Pieter) van Mastricht (or Maastricht) (November 1630 – February 9, 1706) was a Reformed theologian. He is best known for his work Theoretico-practica theologia.

== Life ==
He was born in Cologne to Thomas Schoring and Jeanne le Plancque; his parents had fled from Maastricht during the Dutch revolt. He changed his family name to "van Mastricht" on moving to Cologne. Petrus occasionally used the Latinized pseudonym Scheuneneus.

Johannes Hoornbeeck was Mastricht's pastor from 1639 to 1643 and his teacher at the University of Utrecht starting in 1647, along with Gisbertus Voetius and others. From 1650 to 1652 he took a tour of study at Leiden University, the University of Heidelberg and possibly Oxford.

After his studies, he took pastorates at Xanten, Glückstadt, Frankfurt an der Oder, and Duisburg. While Mastricht is considered to be a follower of the school of Voetius, his Classis (ecclesiastical) in Xanten was predominantly Cocceian, a school to which Voetians were opposed. For this reason, and because of some irenic statements Mastricht made, he is considered to have been somewhat ecumenical in contrast to the vitriolic polemics common between Voetians and Coccieans of his day. He completed his Master of Arts and Doctor of Theology at the University of Duisburg in 1669 while serving as a pastor. Mastricht served as professor of Hebrew and theology at that university from 1670 to 1677. He then succeeded Voetius as professor of Hebrew and theology at the University of Utrecht in 1677. He also served as an elder and supply preacher for the classis of Amsterdam. He served there until he became too infirm and began teaching at home in 1700.

He died on 10 February 1706, due to an injury he received during a fall.

== Theology ==
Mastricht, following his teachers Voetius and Hoornbeeck, saw theology as essentially practical, but did not see the use of scholastic theological method as antithetical to the practical use of theology for Christian piety. He opposed the rising influence of Cartesianism. He wrote treatises against Christopher Wittich, Petrus Allinga, and Balthasar Bekker.

== Publications ==
His works include;

- Theologia Theoretico-Practica 1655 onwards
- Vindiciae veritatis Sacrae Scripturae contra Christophorum Wittichium, c. 1659
- De fide salvificâ syntagma Theoretico-practicum; in quo fidei salvificae tum natura, tum praxis universa, exponitur; cum praefatione de membris Ecclesiae visitilis, seu admittendis, seu rejiciendis, Duisburgi ad Rhen. 1671
- Novitatum Cartesianarum Gangraena, corporis Theologici nobiliores plerasque partes arrodens; seu Theologia Cartesiana detecta. Duisburgi. 1677
- Academiae Ultrajeet. Votum symbolicum: sol. justitiae. Traj. ad Rhen. 1677
- Contra Beckerum. 1692
- Cartesianismi gangraena insanabilis. 1680

== Legacy ==
The American theological scholar Jonathan Edwards regarded Mastricht highly. He said of Mastricht's magnus opus, "much better than Turretin or any other book in the world, excepting the Bible, in my opinion.". Up until that time Francis Turretin was the premier Reformed Christianity academic and polemic author.

== Bibliography ==
- Rester, Todd M. (2013). "Introduction: Petrus van Mastricht". In van Mastricht, Petrus (ed.). The Best Method of Preaching (PDF). Grand Rapids, MI: Reformation Heritage Books. Archived (PDF) from the original on 2013-08-19.
