= La Neuville-en-Hez =

- Commune
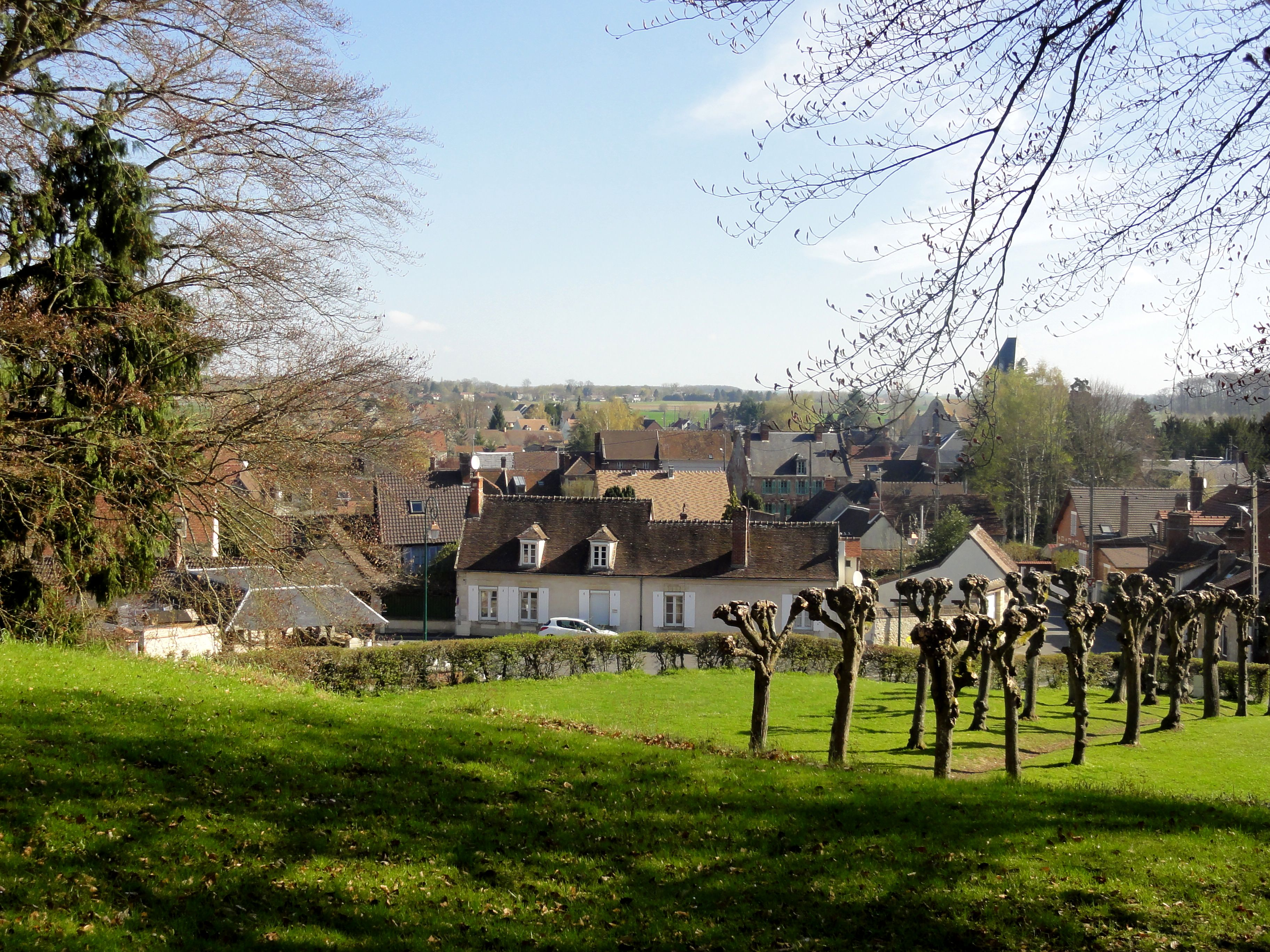
- A general viiew of La Neuville-en-Hez

- Coat of arms
- Location of La Neuville-en-Hez
- Location within France Location within Hauts-de-France
- Coordinates: 49°24′16″N 2°19′26″E
- Country: France
- Region: Hauts-de-France
- Department: Oise
- Arrondissement: Clermont
- Canton: Mouy
- Intercommunality: CA Beauvaisis

Government
  - Mayor (2020–2026): Jean-François Dufour
- Area^{1}: 28.42 km^{2} (10.97 sq mi)
- Elevation: 72 m (236 ft)
- Highest elevation: 161 m (528 ft)
- Lowest elevation: 49 m (161 ft)
- Population (2023): 961
  - Density: 33.8/km^{2} (87.6/sq mi)
- Time zone: UTC+01:00 (CET)
  - Summer (DST): UTC+02:00 (CEST)
- INSEE/Postal code: 60454 /60510
- ^{1} French Land Register data, which excludes lakes, ponds, glaciers > 1 km^{2} (0.386 sq mi or 247 acres) and river estuaries.

La Neuville-en-Hez is a commune in the Oise department in northern France.

The commune is located 60 km north of Paris, less than 18 km east of Beauvais, 36 km west of Compiegne and 54 km south of Amiens.

The village formed around the twelfth-century castle built by Count Raoul de Clermont, some of which remains.

It contains the Church of Our Lady of the Nativity, dating from the thirteenth century and the convent of Notre Dame de la Garde dating from the fifteenth century.

A statue to King Louis IX of France commemorates the legend that the saint king was born here.

== See also ==
- Communes of the Oise department
