= Giuseppe Agnelli =

Italian theologian

Giuseppe Agnelli (1621 in Naples – 17 October 1706 in Rome), was a Roman Catholic author, chiefly known for his catechetical and devotional works.

== Biography ==
Agnelli entered the Society of Jesus, in Rome, in 1637. He was professor of moral theology, and rector of the colleges of Montepulciano, Macerata, and Ancona, and also Consultor of the Inquisition of the March of Ancona. He passed the last thirty-three years of his life in the professed house in Rome, where he died.

== Works ==
Agnelli wrote:

- "Il Catechismo annuale". It was adapted to the use of parish priests, and contained explanations of the Gospels for every Sunday of the year. It went through three editions.
- A week's devotion to St. Joseph, for the Bona Mors Sodality.
- Four treatises on the "Exercises of St. Ignatius", chiefly with regard to election.
- A Raccolta of meditations for a triduum and a retreat of ten days.
- Sermons for Lent and Advent.
