= Carlo Cecere =

Italian composer

Carlo Cecere (7 November 1706 – 15 February 1761) was an Italian composer of operas, concertos and instrumental duets including, for example, some mandolin duets and a concerto for mandolin. Cecere worked in the transitional period between the Baroque and Classical eras.

== Life ==
Surprisingly little is known about his life, given that he lived in the 18th century. It is known that Cecere was born in Grottole (Basilicata) and died in Naples both then in the Kingdom of Naples; he is buried in the chapel of the Congregazione dei Musici di S. Maria la Nuova. But it is not even known which instrument(s) he played by preference. According to some sources, he was mainly a violinist, he was certainly a violinist in the monastery of the Carmine in Naples, whereas other sources believe he was primarily a flautist.

== Music ==
Cecere set to music at least two librettos by Pietro Trinchera, including La tavernola abentorosa. Trinchera, not Cecere, was punished because La tavernola abentorosa's satirical portrayal of monastic life was considered a buffoonish mockery. It was the first comic opera written specifically for a monastic audience.

== Selected discography ==
- Italian Flute Concertos, performed by Jean-Pierre Rampal (flute) with I Solisti Veneti conducted by Claudio Scimone: Carlo Cecere's Concerto for Flute in A major together with Eustachio Romano's Concerto for Flute in G major, Giuseppe Matteo Alberti's Concerto for Flute in F major "con sordini" and Giovanni Battista Sammartini's Concerto for Flute in G major. (Sony Classical SNYC 47228SK), a 1991 recording, available as of 2007.
- Concerti Napoletani per Mandolino performed by Dorina Frati (mandolin) with the Symphonia Perusina: Carlo Cecere's Concerto for Mandolin together with Giuseppe Giuliano's Sinfonia for Mandolin, Strings and Basso Continuo in B flat major and his Concerto for Mandolin in G major, Domenico Gaudioso's Concerto for Mandolin in G major, and Giovanni Paisiello's Concerto for Mandolin in E flat major. (Dynamic DYN 193), a 1999 recording, available as of 2009
