= Edward Thache =

- Born: June 14, 1659; Stonehouse, Gloucestershire
- Died: November 16, 1706 (aged 47); Jamaica
- Occupation: Plantation owner
- Known for: The father of Blackbeard

Captain Edward Thache (June 14, 1659 - November 16, 1706) was a wealthy plantation owner in the capital city of St. Jago de la Vega, or Spanish Town, Jamaica. His son Edward Thache Jr. is probably the well-known pirate Blackbeard, captain of the Queen Anne's Revenge, and a Royal Navy veteran of Queen Anne's War on HMS Windsor.

== Life ==
Edward Thache was born in Stonehouse, Gloucestershire, the son of Anglican minister Rev. Thomas Thache and Rachel Nelme Thache of Sapperton, Gloucestershire, England. He most likely left the port of Bristol, Gloucestershire, England circa 1685 with his family: wife Elizabeth, son Edward Thache Jr. and daughter Elizabeth, for Jamaica in the West Indies. While records of Thaches are necessarily sparse in Bristol, a probable nephew of Capt. Thache, Thomas "Thatch", had lived in Bristol by 1712 and had leased a house "a mere block from the city docks" from his cousin Martin Nelme (Coroner of Bristol since 24 March 1697). The 1686 census for Bristol does not show a Thache family, however, and it is presumed that they left for Jamaica by that time.

Capt. Thache's first wife Elizabeth died and was buried on January 13, 1699 in Spanish Town at St. Catherine's Anglican Church. Thache remarried on June 11, 1699 to twice-widowed Lucretia Poquet Maverly Ethell. They had issue: Cox Thache (bapt. July 8, 1700), Rachel Thache (bapt. February 6, 1704), and Thomas Thache (bapt. November 17, 1705). Capt. Edward Thache then died and was buried at the same church in Jamaica on November 16, 1706. He did not have a will and his entire estate fell upon his eldest son, per the law of primogeniture. The following December 10, that eldest son Edward Thache Jr., then serving on HMS Windsor, deeded his inheritance to his step-mother Lucretia so that they could administer the family plantation and take care of her young children, including the young daughter of Edward Thache Jr., another Elizabeth, probably born in nearby Kingston.

Lucretia never married a fourth time. She kept the Thache family name as matriarch for thirty-seven years until her death in 1743. Barbadian resident Charles Leslie, author of A New Account of Jamaica, published in 1739, had visited Jamaica, presumably in the 1730s, to research his book. Having read A General History of the Pyrates, by Captain Charles Johnson(discovered to be Nathaniel Mist), he was astounded to discover that "Black-beard... was born in Jamaica, of very creditable parents." Leslie also wrote "... [Blackbeard's] Mother is alive in Spanish-Town to this Day [Lucretia died 1743], and his Brother [Cox] is at present Captain of the Train of Artillery."
