= Pedro de Ardanaz =

Spanish baroque composer

Pedro de Ardanaz (or Ardanas) (1638–1706) was a Spanish baroque composer. Some of his works are preserved in Latin American manuscripts, and in the El Escorial archive.

== Works, editions, recordings ==
- Villancico Ay aflijida dama
