= Anna Barbara Abesch =

Swiss artist (1706–1773)

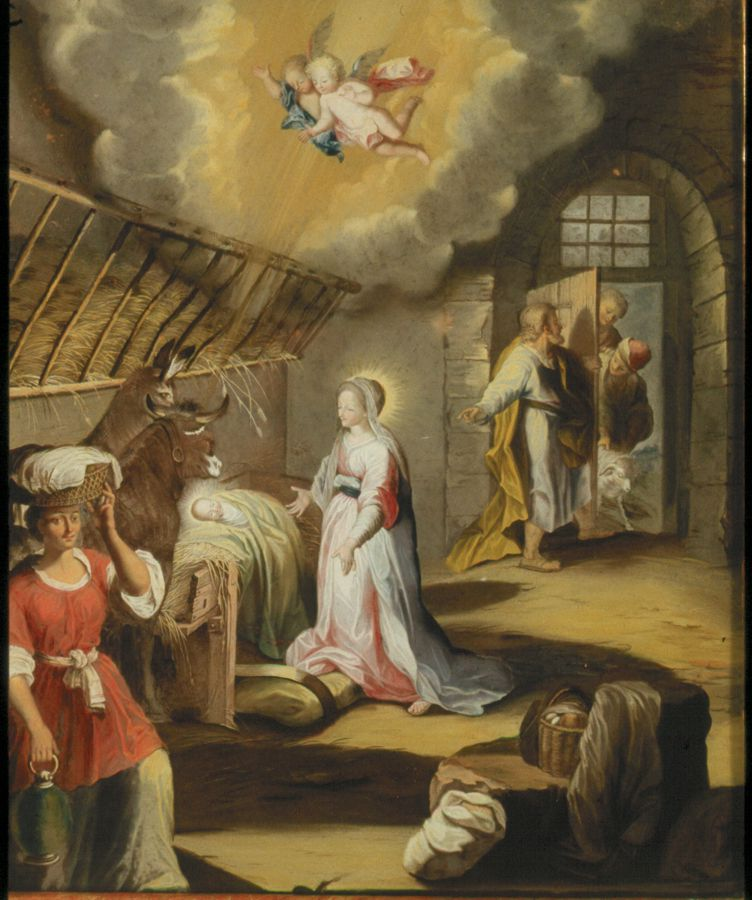
The Birth of Christ, after Barocci (1744)

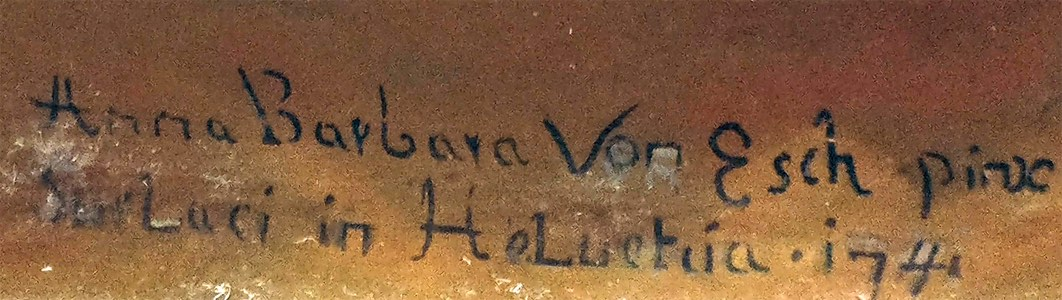
Anna Barbara Abesch (Von Esch), full signature

Anna Maria Barbara Abesch (23 March 1706 – 15 February 1773) was a Swiss reverse-glass painter active in Sursee, Switzerland. She exerted a strong stylistic influence. About 120 dated works, 40 undated works, and 100 attributed works survive; they are mainly biblical and mythological in subject, and also include portraits.

== Biography ==
Abesch was born in Sursee on 23 March 1706 and worked there as a reverse-glass painter. She exerted a strong stylistic influence. She probably learned drawing and reverse-glass painting from her father, Johann Peter Abesch. She was unmarried and is recorded as a member of the Sursee Georg Brotherhood in 1747 and the St. Joseph Brotherhood in 1750.

== Works ==
About 120 dated works, 40 undated works, and 100 attributed works survive. Her reverse-glass paintings are mainly biblical scenes and images of saints, more rarely allegories, mythological scenes, and portraits. They were executed after Italian, Flemish, German, and especially French print sources. Her earliest known works date from 1727 and her last from around 1770. In addition to reverse-glass paintings made as wall decorations, she also produced small jewellery pendants for traditional costume and painted glass inserts for goldsmith work, boxes, and furniture.

Based on the large number of commissions she received from monasteries and private patrons, later scholarship has proposed the existence of a workshop in Sursee. One of Abesch’s known works is the 1741 reverse-glass painting ''Gottes Ratschluss zur Menschwerdung'', now in the Stiftsschatz of St. Leodegar in Lucerne.

== Technique ==
Abesch usually worked in reverse order of the paint layers, applying delicate colours in very thin layers, often by dabbing, so that the underlying colours could show through. Shadow areas were generally left unpainted and achieved through the effect of a soot-darkened backing sheet, while gold highlights were used only occasionally.
