= Caspar Schamberger =

German surgeon (1623–1706)

Caspar Schamberger (1 September 1623 in Leipzig, Germany – 8 April 1706) was a German surgeon. His name represents the first school of Western medicine in Japan and the beginning of rangaku, or Dutch studies.

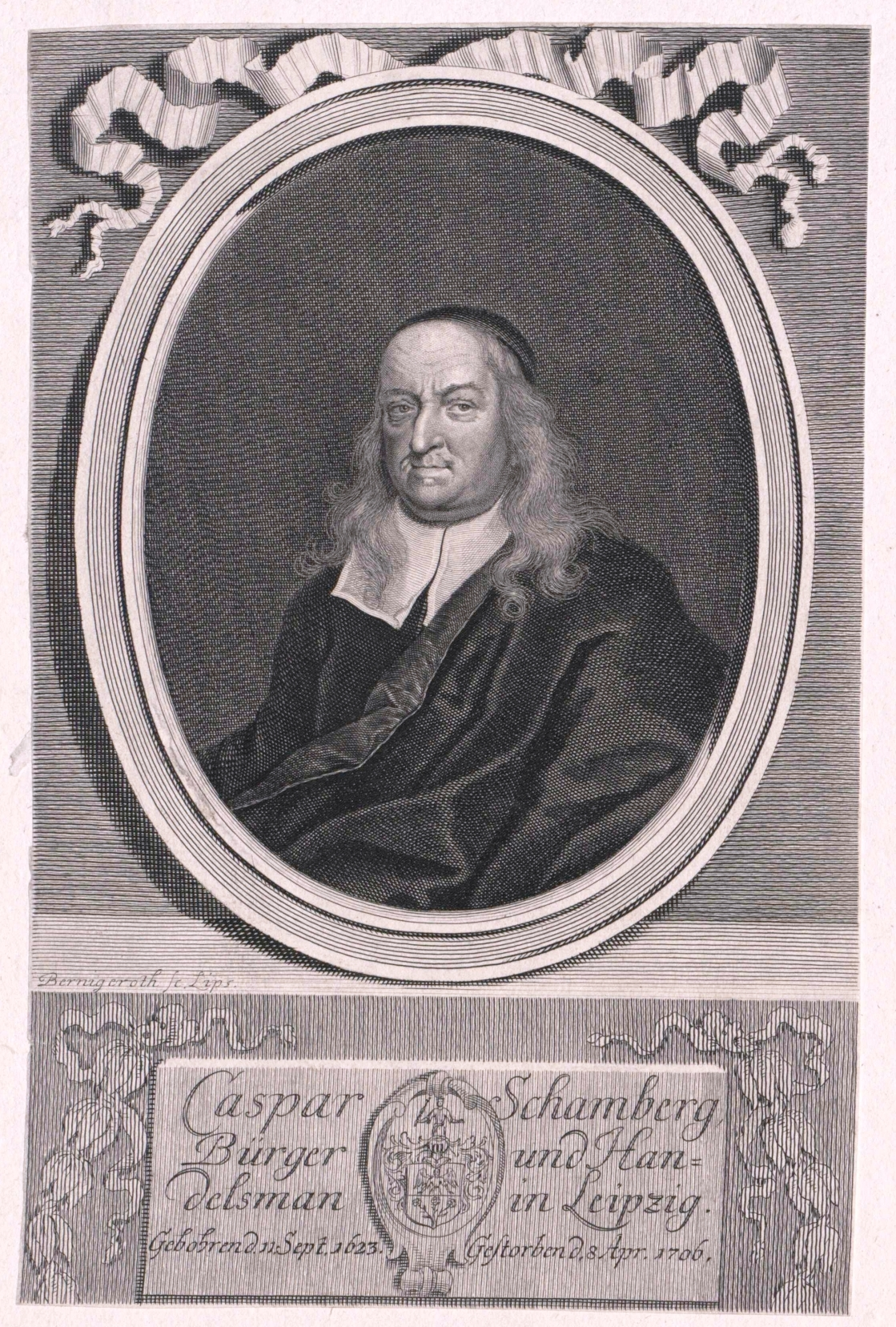
Caspar Schamberger

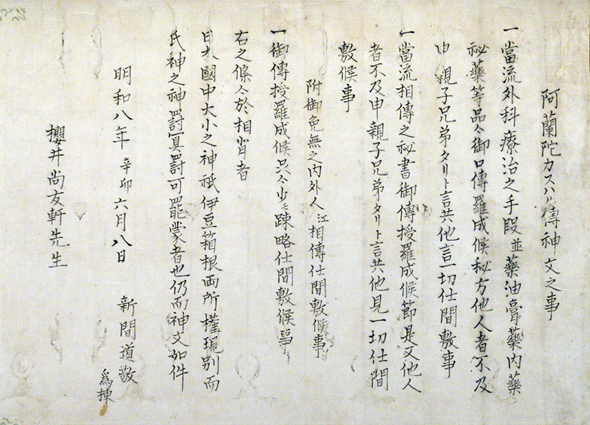
Pledge by a Japanese disciple to his medical teacher to keep the teachings of Caspar about pharmaceutical oils, plasters, etc. absolutely secret. Written by Shinma Michitaka and addressed to his master Sakurai Naotomo in 1771.

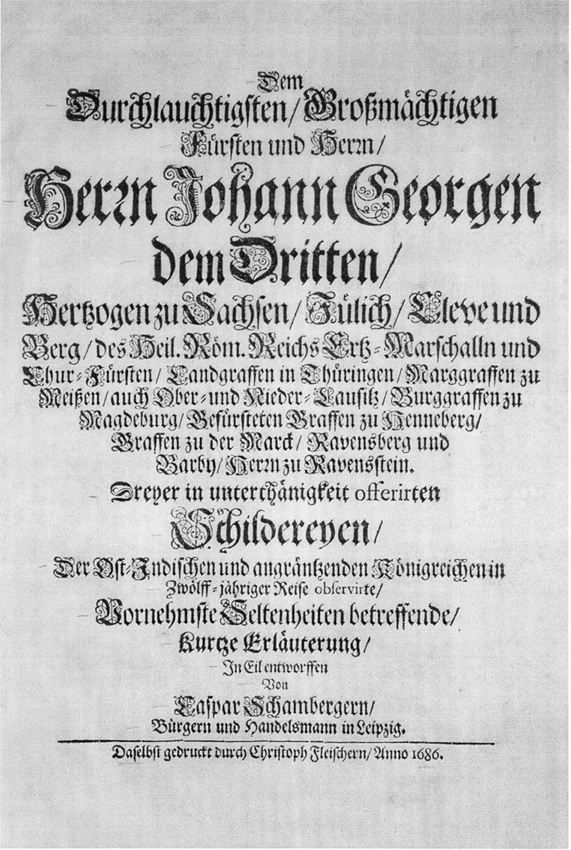
Titlepage of a booklet published by Caspar Schamberger dealing with people, plants, coins and other observations made during his stay in East Asia

Schamberger grew up in war-torn Saxony. In 1637 he started studying surgery under the master surgeon of the surgeons guild in his native town of Leipzig. Three years late he finished his education and started traveling through Northern Germany, Denmark, Sweden, and the Netherlands. In 1643 he joined the Dutch East India Company (VOC), signing a contract for four years of service. Schamberger left Europe in the same year aboard the Eiland Mauritius, but the ship wrecked four months later near the Cape of Good Hope.

In July 1644 Schamberger finally arrived in Batavia, the administrative center of the expanding Dutch colonial empire. The next few years he worked as a ship surgeon, visiting Portuguese Goa, Ceylon, Gamron and Kismis (Persia), to return to Batavia again in 1646. In summer 1649 he arrived in Nagasaki and began his service at Dejima, the Dutch trading post in Japan. Later that year he traveled to Edo as a member of a special embassy, that was dispatched to Japan due to seriously strained Dutch-Japanese relations. Because of the serious illness of shogun Tokugawa Iemitsu, their audience was postponed several times. During that time Schamberger attracted the attention of Imperial commissioner Inoue Masashige, who was responsible for the internal security of the empire and its relations to the VOC. Inoue, who had a keen interest in useful Western know how, introduced Schamberger to feudal lords and Schamberger started to look after high-ranking patients.

His treatment must have been quite successful. When the Dutch envoy finally returned to Nagasaki in spring 1650 four Europeans were requested to stay in Edo to give further instructions: Schamberger (surgery), Willem Bijlevelt (mathematics), the Swedish corporal Juriaen Schedel (mortar shooting), and Schedel's assistant Jan Smidt. After an exceptionally long stay in Edo the four went back to Nagasaki in October 1650. But Schamberger had to return again shortly after, participating in the annual journey to the court of the Dutch trading post chief. This time too he was called to the residences of high-ranking officials.

In April 1651, the Dutch entourage left for Nagasaki again. That November, Schamberger's service at Dejima ended, and he returned to Batavia. His interpreter Inomata Dembei, following orders from the governor of Nagasaki, had to draw up an extensive report on Schamberger's surgical art. This report and the contentment and continuous interest among high-ranking officials and feudal lords led to the birth of the so-called “Caspar-style-surgery" (kasuparu-ryû geka), the first Western-style school of medicine inspired by a surgeon stationed in Dejima.

In 1655, Schamberger returned to the Netherlands, traveling back to Leipzig a few weeks after. In 1658 he acquired citizenship in Leipzig and started a new career as a merchant. He married three times: to Elisabeth Rost in 1659, to Regina Maria Conrad in 1662, and to Euphrosine Kleinau in 1685. In 1667 his son Johann Christian Schamberg was born. Johann later became a Professor of Medicine at Leipzig University and was elected president twice. One of his greatest achievements was the foundation of the "New Anatomical Theatre".

In 1686, Schamberger published an extensive description of three illustrations depicting a great variety of people, exotic fruits, coins, animals, and artifacts he had observed all over "East India". It is dedicated to the Duke elect Johann III. Only one copy of this private print is preserved.

In 1706, Schamberger died, only to be followed shortly after by his son.

Schamberger's name stands for the beginning of a lasting interest in Western style medicine that gradually led to the upcoming of the so-called Dutch Studies (rangaku) in early modern Japan.

== Works ==
- Dem Durchlauchtigsten Großmächtigen Fürsten und Herrn Herrn Johann Georgen dem Dritten Hertzogen zu Sachsen [...] Dreyer in unterthänigkeit offerirten Schildereyen Der Ost Indischen und angräntzenden Königreichen in Zwölff=jähriger Reise observirte Vornehmste Seltenheiten betreffende Kurtze Erläuterung In Eil entworffen Von Caspar Schambergern Bürgern und Handelsmann in Leipzig. Daselbst gedruckt durch Christoph Fleischern Anno 1686.
