= Sabina Auffenwerth =

German artist (1706–1782)

Sabina Aufenwerth or Auffenwerth
- Born: 1706; Germany
- Died: 1782 (aged 75–76)
- Citizenship: Germany
- Occupation: German painter

Sabina Aufenwerth or Auffenwerth (1706–1782) was a German painter. She was one of the first named women in Europe working alongside male counterpart within ceramic design and decoration. However, before the 19th century, many women were under-acknowledged for their contribution to pottery and therefore much of her work is unknown.

== Biography ==
Sabina Aufenwerth was the daughter of a goldsmith named Johann Aufenwerth (1659–1728) in Augsburg. She worked alongside her sister Anna Elisabeth Wald in Augsburg in her father's business, where they gained skills working with metals such as gold and silver. They produced chinoiserie silhouette designs for the Meissen porcelain factory from 1720 to 1760. They mainly designed objects such as cups, teapots, saucers and plates which were described as "imaginatively conceived family scenes in indoor settings, comedies and musicians after Watteau, cavaliers and their ladies, hunting and battle scenes, portraitists and finally, mythological and allegorical themes".

Aufenwerth married an engraver and publisher, Issak Heinrich Hosennestel, in 1731 and continued to work for Meissen.
