= Jean-Baptiste Barsalou =

Jean-Baptiste Barsalou (9 September 1706 – 18 March 1776) was from a business family in Montreal, his father having been a master tanner with his own business in that location.

Due to the premature death of his father, Jean-Baptiste's family was divided up and he fell under the custody of an elder brother who ran the tannery and other business interests of the family. Jean began his working life in the fur trade as a voyageur for his uncle, Jean-Baptiste Neveu. By the early 1730s he had taken over the family tannery and entered into various business arrangements to further this enterprise. By 1747 he had expanded into buying and selling land on the St. Lawrence.

The Seven Years' War and the subsequent English rule was devastating to many businesses of the time and Jean-Baptiste's holdings were no exception. Instead of passing a large estate to his sons, his holdings were almost all gone. His sons became voyageurs and the Barsalou tannery ceased to exist.
