= Jacques Testu de Belval =

French ecclesiastic and poet

Abbé Jacques Testu de Belval (c. 1626, Paris – June 1706) was a French ecclesiastic and poet. Best known for his light poetry, he was also a preacher, translator and king's almoner. He was linked with Madame de Sévigné, Madame de Coulanges, Madame de Brancas, Madame de Schomberg, Madame de La Fayette and Marie-Madeleine de Rochechouart, abbess of Fontevrault Abbey. He was elected to the Académie française in 1665 and received in May that year.
