= Paul-Yves Pezron =

French linguist (1639–1706)

Paul-Yves Pezron (20 January 1639, Hennebont, – 9 October 1706, Brie) was a seventeenth-century Cistercian brother from Brittany, best known for his 1703 publication of a study on the common origin of the Bretons and the Welsh, Antiquité de la nation, et de langue des Celtes. Pezron was a Doctor of Theology at the Cistercian College of St. Bernard in Paris and abbot of La Charmoye, in the commune of Montmort-Lucy.

In his time, he was known in France as a chronologist. Pezron traced Welsh and Breton origins to the Celts of ancient writers, and traced the Celts further to eponymous hero-patriarchs from Gaul to Galatia. Pezron believed the Welsh language came from a mother tongue called Celtick, a language that was only a theory to other authors. Pezron's fairly unscientific book was popular and reprinted until the early nineteenth century.
