= Nicolas Mathieu (collector) =

French priest and music collector

Nicolas Mathieu (French pronunciation: [nikɔla matjø]; 164? – 30 March 1706, in Paris) was a noted music collector and a Catholic priest of the Église Saint-André-des-Arts in Paris from 1681 until his death. He amassed one of the largest collections of Italian music of the 16th and 17th century outside of Italy. His library was utilized by many noted French musicians both during his lifetime and after his death. Mathieu bequeathed his music collection to composer Michel Richard Delalande upon his death.

Mathieu also organized a series of concerts focusing on Italian vocal and instrumental music at the Église Saint-André-des-Arts from 1681-1706 which included music by Giovanni Battista Bononcini, Francesco Cavalli, Arcangelo Corelli, Luigi Rossi, and Alessandro Stradella among others. François Couperin attended some of these concerts as a young man, and was influenced by them.
