= Siege of Amiens (1597) =

16th century battle in France

- Part of the Franco-Spanish War (1595–1598) and Anglo-Spanish War (1585–1604)
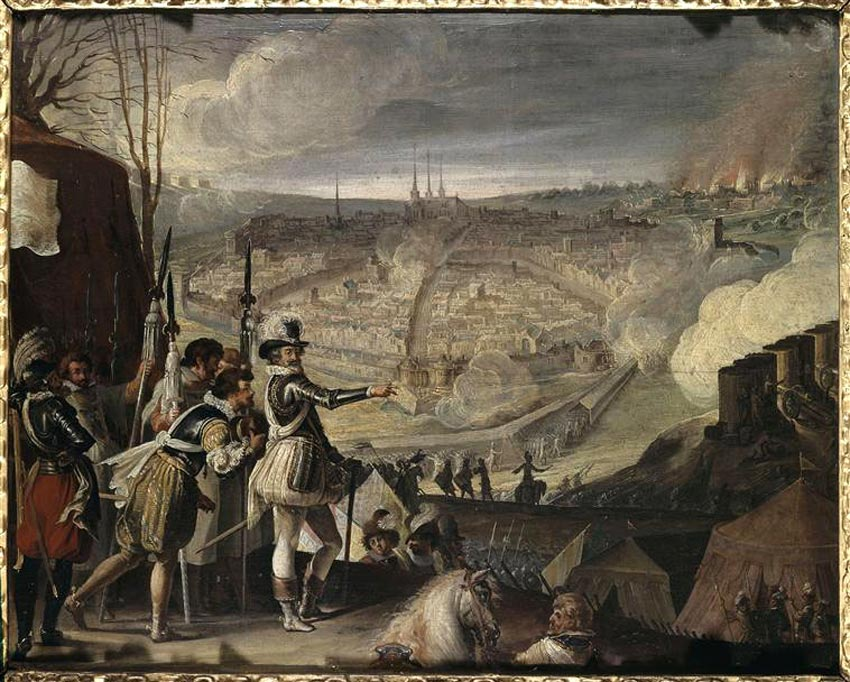
- Henry IV before Amiens; Anonymous, Versailles Museum
Date	13 May – 25 September 1597
Location	Amiens, Picardy, Kingdom of France 49°53′31″N 2°17′56″E
Result	Franco-English victory: Peace of Vervins

Belligerents
Kingdom of France; Kingdom of England	Spain

Commanders and leaders
(Kingdom of France) Henry IV of France (Kingdom of France) Duke of Sully (Kingdom of France) Duke of Mayenne (Kingdom of France) Duke of Biron (England) Thomas Baskerville (England) Arthur Chichester	(Spain) Albert VII (Spain) Hernando Tello Portocarrero † (Spain) Girolamo Caraffa (Spain) Ernst von Mansfeld (relief)

Strength
12,000 infantry 3,000 cavalry: (4,200 English)	29,000 infantry 3,000 cavalry: 5,500 (Amiens); 25,000 (relief force)

Casualties and losses
600 killed or wounded	2,000 killed or wounded 5,000 surrendered

The siege of Amiens (French: Siège d'Amiens) was a siege and battle fought during the Franco-Spanish War (1595–1598), as part of both the French Wars of Religion and the Anglo-Spanish War (1585–1604), between 13 May and 25 September 1597. The Spanish, who had sent a large army in March, had captured the city of Amiens easily in a ruse. Henry IV of France, after the surprise of the capture, immediately and quickly built up an army which included a large English force and besieged Amiens on 13 May.

An attempted relief force sent under the command of Ernst von Mansfeld and the Archduke of Austria repeatedly failed to dislodge the besiegers and afterwards the Spanish relief force retreated. Amiens ultimately fell back into Henry's hands with the surrender of the entire Spanish force. As a result of the victory, Henry was in a strong position to enact the Edict of Nantes and to negotiate the peace of Vervins which was signed with Spain the following spring. The siege was the last major military event in the Franco-Spanish War as well as the French Wars of Religion.

== Background ==
Spain under Philip II had intervened regularly in the Wars of Religion in favour of the Catholic League against the Huguenots, most notably in the siege of Paris (1590), the siege of Rouen (1591), and the Battle of Craon, in 1592. However, only in 1595 was war officially declared between the two countries by the new French king, Henry IV, who had converted to Catholicism and been received into Paris the year before to be crowned with popular support. From then on, the civil war began to turn against the hardliners of the Spanish-supported Catholic League, including two major royal French victories over the Spanish at Fontaine-Française and Ham, in 1595. The Spanish rebounded with a strong campaign over the next year, capturing Le Catelet, Doullens, Cambrai, Calais and Ardres.

In 1597, Hernando Tello de Portocarrero, the Spanish governor of the town of Doullens, proposed a plan to Albert of Austria, governor of the Habsburg Netherlands, to take the capital of Picardy, Amiens, by surprise. The Archduke agreed and saw the acquisition of Amiens as compensation for the recent defeat at Turnhout in Brabant by Anglo-Dutch forces led by Maurice of Nassau earlier in the year. He assigned 7,000 infantry and 700 cavalry to Governor Porto Carrero. The plan was to hide 500 infantry and horsemen in small groups close to the city. The Governor sent sixteen men dressed as peasants into the city and divided them into three groups.

=== Spanish capture Amiens ===
On the morning of 11 March, these men entered the Gate of Montrescu. The first group carried sacks of walnuts and apples, which "accidentally" capsized at the city gate. When French guards grabbed the nuts, the "peasants" produced pistols and overpowered the guards. One guard dropped the gates, but it could not close because the "peasants" had unhitched a wagon filled with wood under it. The 500 hidden Spanish infantry and cavalry timed it perfectly to storm into the city. With barely any resistance, the city was soon under Spanish control. The people of Amiens still have the nickname walnut eaters after this incident.

=== Henry's reaction ===
Henry, who had spent the winter in Paris, was awakened that night at the Louvre and by morning had donned his armour. The situation was now serious as the road now lay open to Paris across the Somme valley. At the time, a peace proposal was being made between France and Spain. Taking back Amiens would afford Henry a major bargaining position and ensure that peace was his ultimate objective. In effect, the siege of Amiens would decide the war between France and Spain. However, money was short in the French war chest and much dissent was caused amongst Henry's old Huguenot allies, many of whom refused to join and wanted concessions now that he had become a Catholic. Henry relied heavily on outside resources, money and troops especially from the English. Queen Elizabeth I, after much dithering reluctantly agreed to the release of her troops after considering bargaining for Boulogne or an indemnity in money, the latter of which was agreed.

== Siege ==
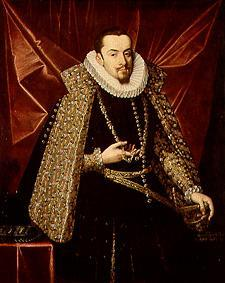
Archduke Albert of Austria by Juan Pantoja de la Cruz

On 13 May Henry quickly brought an army of 4,000 French and Swiss infantry and 700 French cavalry under Charles de Gontaut, duc de Biron, to Amiens. In a form of high diplomacy, Henry gave the Huguenots hopes of substantial rights and he made sure to stick to that guarantee once the siege was over. This army soon began to expand from all over the kingdom but the main reinforcement was from the English. Via the Triple Alliance, Elizabeth had sent 2,000 English troops to France under the command of Sir Thomas Baskerville with another 1,500 English raised in Rouen. Most were veterans from the fighting in Flanders and most of them had fought at Turnhout earlier in the year.

This army cut off the provision lines from Doullens and began to lay siege to the city. The Spanish were surprised by the speed of the French reaction, many civilians were chased from the city and Amiens prepared for a long siege. The French camp grew in size while still well provisioned. Two hospitals were established and the army was financed at the expense of the Duke of Sully. The French dug parallel and quasi-parallel trenches, one of the first in siege warfare, preceding Vauban's designs. The Spanish launched many attempts against the siege works, but these were mainly unsuccessful.

On 22 May 1597, Portocarrero made a furious sally with 500 cavalry on the headquarters of General Biron, seizing a fort which the French had built to defend the headquarters. After two hours of fighting, the Spaniards were driven out and were soon pursued by the French troops, who almost made an entry into the city. The Spaniards were saved by the arrival of 400 infantry who repulsed the French, which allowed them to close the gates.

In mid-June Elizabeth sent more reinforcements from England with another 700 troops under Sir Arthur Chichester having landed at St Valery. Chichester would then replace the ill and dying Baskerville as the commander of the English forces in France. With this addition the English force totalled nearly 4,200 men.

On 4 September, a French raiding party took a bastion on the south side of the city and in the assault Portocarrero was killed just before the French withdrew. He was succeeded by Girolamo Caraffa, Marquis of Montenegro. Four days later, François d'Espinay de Saint-Luc, the grand master of artillery, was killed by an arquebus and Henry mourned him greatly. This was a great blow to the morale of French troops.

The situation inside Amiens, however, was grim as the siege took its toll. Many troops suffered from disease and the lack of food. Caraffa, in desperation, sent out messengers to the Archduke Albert, two of whom managed to get through.

=== Attempted relief ===
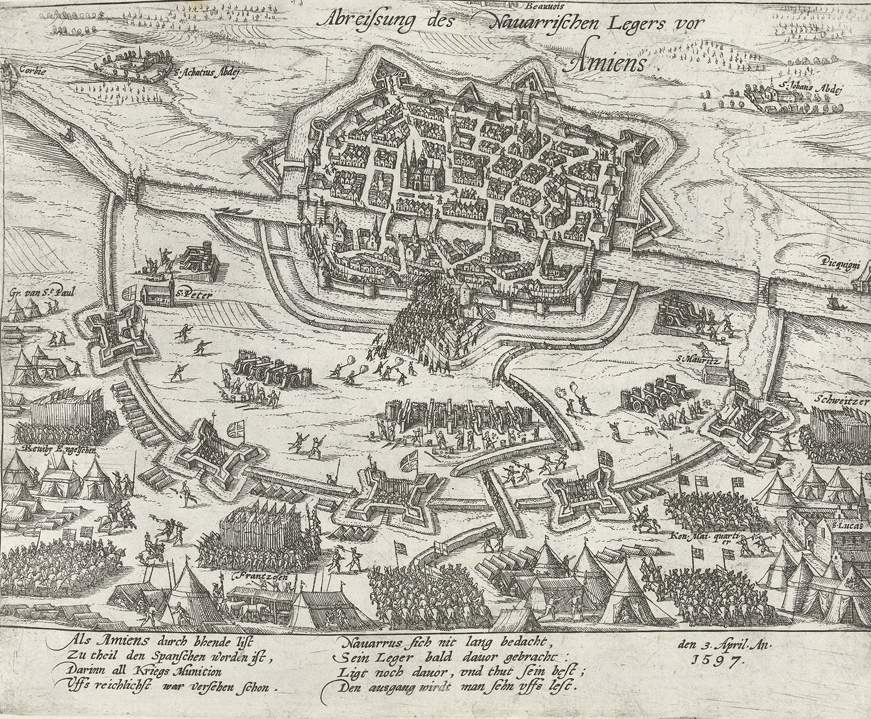
Siege of Amiens 1597 showing the English positions (left) and French positions, by Frans Hogenberg

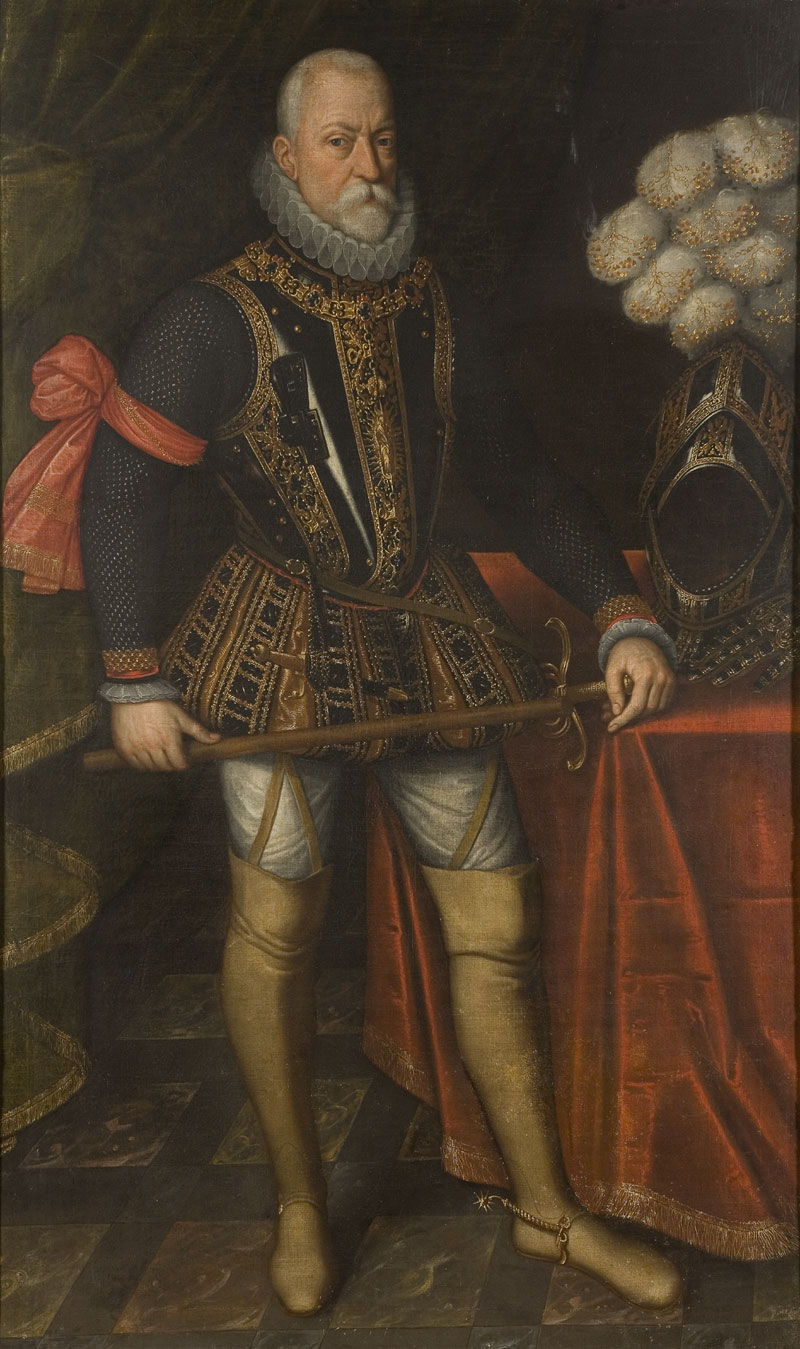
Peter Ernst I von Mansfeld, by Antonis Mor

On 10 September, Caraffa was informed that two Spanish relief armies were under way: one under Archduke Albert and the other under Peter Ernst I von Mansfeld-Vorderort consisting of over 25,000 men which included veteran Tercios. Charles, Duke of Mayenne, was able to convince Henry IV and Biron not to confront the huge relief army, but to remain in the entrenchments knowing they were outnumbered nearly two-to-one if in open battle. This strategy would be successful, and Mansfeld's force appeared six miles below Amiens on 18 September upon the banks of the Somme.

Von Mansfeld was the first to arrive, on 20 September, and he launched an immediate attack on the entrenched French camps and then the English camp, but all were repelled, inflicting huge losses. In the latter attack, Arthur Chichester, 1st Baron Chichester was wounded in the shoulder but was knighted by the French king for his valour.

The Archduke Albert had arrived the following day, bringing in all troops he could muster, hoping to break the encirclement. On hearing of Mansfeld's difficulty, he immediately ordered a discharge of his whole artillery in order to make it known to the besieged that succour was at hand. After passing the abbey of Bettancourt, Albert attempted to throw a bridge over the river Somme below the village of Longpre, but due to poor weather and rising waters he resolved to find another way. Eventually the southern bank was reached, but soon after the Spanish were driven back after having been battered by French artillery fire and were forced to withdraw to the other bank.

Another attack was planned for the next day, but on observing the French and English force in the strengthened trenches, Albert decided not to risk further heavy losses. Although the relief army under Von Mansfeld and Albert had more numbers than the Anglo-French, their morale was low. After being consistently repelled with heavy losses and with rumours of mutiny and dissent in the ranks, the Archduke decided the situation was hopeless. He ordered the attack cancelled and decided to withdraw in good order.

The king immediately followed with the greater part of his army so that the Spaniards were constantly harassed, but the Archduke avoided battle and withdrew quickly under the cover of darkness. The king then turned his attention back to the citadel of Amiens.

=== Surrender ===
Henry could now see the Spanish position was hopeless, and not long after the archduke's retreat he summoned Caraffa to surrender. Caraffa reluctantly agreed and negotiations for the surrender of the city began soon after. It was signed on 25 September.

Henry granted the garrison an honourable capitulation and reviewed the surrender of the Spanish forces.

== Aftermath ==
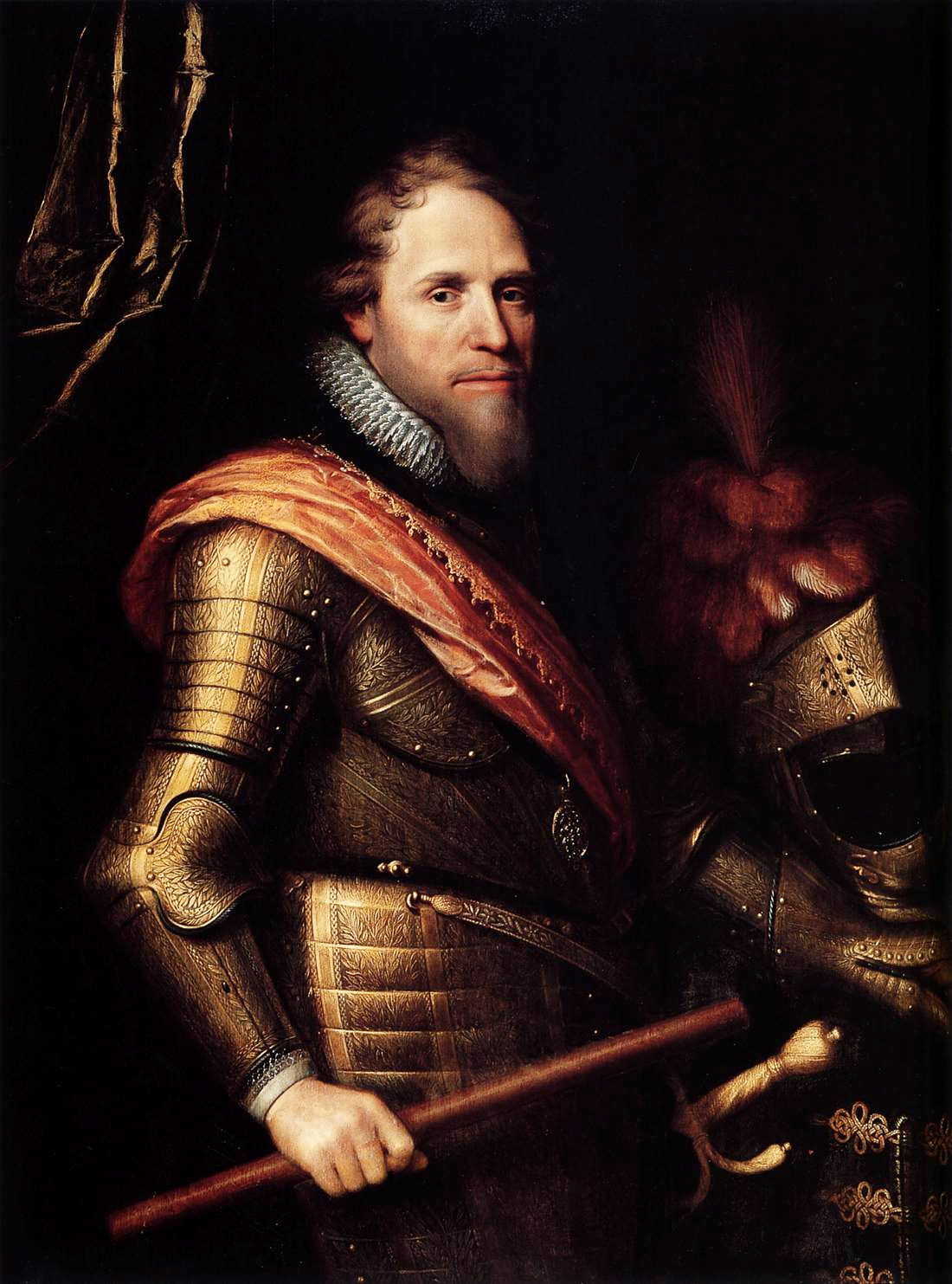
Portrait of Maurice of Orange by Michiel Jansz. van Mierevelt, 1607

The cost for the Spanish was high, with over 5,000 being captured at Amiens, which included many wounded and sick. The relief force had suffered nearly 2,000 casualties — again many to disease. As the surrendered troops marched past they pulled with them hundreds of carts loaded with dead and wounded while the Spanish officers saluted Henry. Amiens was then strongly garrisoned and given much stronger defences under the supervision of the French mathematician and military engineer Jean Errard.

With the help of the two field hospitals, Henry's forces had suffered moderate losses which came to just over 600. As a result, the siege of Amiens became known as the velvet siege. This was one of the first sieges or battles known where field hospitals were established.

The siege had strategic consequences: Albert's concentration on Amiens meant that the Spanish forces guarding the border with the Dutch Republic were left on their own, enabling Maurice of Orange to capture several cities in his celebrated campaign of 1597.

With the Picardy capital cleared of the Spanish, Henry was now in a good position to negotiate, but in order to be in a stronger position he had to subdue the rest of France. The following year Henry thus launched a major campaign in Brittany, the last of the League holdouts. However, this was as much diplomatic as it was military. The aim was to win over the Protestants as well as the remaining rebel Catholics, including the Duke of Mercœur. The King set off with an army 14,000 strong and the campaign that followed was a great success. He kept his promise of substantial rights that he had made during the Amiens siege. The rest of the war was almost a formality. While peace negotiations were being held with Philip, towns threw out the last League stalwarts and any supporting Spanish garrisons, who offered minimal resistance. Finally, Mercœur gave in; his submission to Henry at Angers was completed on 20 March 1598. Henry then triumphantly marched into Nantes and issued the Edict of Nantes on 13 April 1598, which effectively brought an end to the French Wars of Religion.

=== Peace of Vervins ===
The victory at Amiens was celebrated as a huge victory; it marked a decisive turn in the road to Franco-Spanish peace as Spain, overextended and in severe financial difficulty, realized that it needed to abandon its war effort against France. In conjunction with Spanish financial distress, its insolvency caused by the capture of Cádiz, two costly failed armadas (in 1596 and 1597) against England, coupled with the increasingly unsuccessful war against the Dutch, meant that Spain had too much to deal with. Mutinies in the garrisons of Doullens, Cambrai, Ardres and Le Catelet added to Spain's problems. With this advantage, Henry made sure the Peace of Vervins was signed, which would end the war between Spain and France. The treaty was highly beneficial to France — an ill and dying Philip recognised the formerly Protestant Henry as King of France. In addition, Spanish-ruled towns were handed over to the French king under terms of the peace. Vervins was the final defeat of Philip II, and a sign of the long downfall of Habsburg Spain and the gradual rise in the European hegemony of France during the ensuing Grand Siècle.

== Notable participants ==
- Thomas Dudley, an English colonial magistrate who became governor of the Massachusetts Bay Colony and founder of Cambridge, Massachusetts.

== Bibliography ==
- Black, Jeremy (2005). European Warfare, 1494–1660 Warfare and History. Routledge. ISBN 9781134477081.
- Braudel, Fernand (1995). The Mediterranean and the Mediterranean World in the Age of Philip II. University of California Press. ISBN 9780520203303.
- Chaurasia, Radhey Shyam (2002). History of Europe. Atlantic Publishers & Dist. ISBN 9788126901555.
- Duerloo, Luc (2012). Dynasty and Piety: Archduke Albert (1598–1621) and Habsburg Political Culture in an Age of Religious Wars. Shgate Publishing Ltd. ISBN 9781409443759.
- Duffy, Christopher (2013). Siege Warfare: The Fortress in the Early Modern World 1494–1660. Routledge. ISBN 9781136607868.
- Finley-Croswhite, S. Annette (1999). Henry IV and the Towns: The Pursuit of Legitimacy in French Urban Society, 1589–1610. Cambridge University Press. ISBN 9781139425599.
- Fissel, Mark Charles (2001). English Warfare, 1511–1642: Warfare and history. Psychology Press. ISBN 9780415214810.
- Haller, John S. (2011). Battlefield Medicine: A History of the Military Ambulance from the Napoleonic Wars Through World War I – Medical Humanities. Southern Illinois University Press. ISBN 9780809387878.
- Jaques, Tony (2006). Dictionary of Battles and Sieges: A Guide to 8500 Battles from Antiquity Through the Twenty-first Century. Greenwood Publishing Group. ISBN 978-0313335365.
- Jones, J. A. P. (1997). Europe, 1500-1600 Volume 2 – 1997 of Challenging history. Nelson Thornes. ISBN 9780174350644.
- Knecht, Robert J. (1996). The French Wars of Religion 1559–1598, Seminar Studies in History (2 ed.). New York: Longman. ISBN 0-582-28533-X.
- Lennox, Charlotte (1817). The Memoirs of the Duke of Sully: Prime Minister to Henry the Great. Edward Earle, J. Maxwell.
- Levin, Carole (2001). The Reign of Elizabeth I. Palgrave Macmillan. ISBN 9781403919397.
- MacCaffrey, Wallace T. (1994). Elizabeth I: War and Politics, 1588–1603. Princeton University Press. ISBN 9780691036519.
- Nolan, Cathal J. (2006). The Age of Wars of Religion, 1000–1650: An Encyclopaedia of Global Warfare and Civilisation, Volume 2. Greenwood Publishing Group. ISBN 9780313337338.
- Pitts, Vincent J. (2012). Henri IV of France: His Reign and Age Henri IV of France. Johns Hopkins University Press. ISBN 9781421407142.
- Richardson, Douglas; Everingham, Kimball; Faris, David (2004). Plantagenet Ancestry: A Study in Colonial and Medieval Families. Baltimore, MD: Genealogical Publishing Company. ISBN 978-0-8063-1750-2. OCLC 55848314.
- Stewart, Jules (2012). Madrid: The History. I.B. Tauris. ISBN 9781780762814.
- Sutherland, Nicola Mary (2002). Henry IV of France and the Politics of Religion: 1572–1596. Intellect Books. ISBN 9781841507019.
- Hart, Marjolein (2014). The Dutch Wars of Independence: Warfare and Commerce in the Netherlands 1570-1680 Modern Wars In Perspective. Routledge. ISBN 9781317812548.
- Tucker, Spencer C. (2009). A Global Chronology of Conflict: From the Ancient World to the Modern Middle East. ABC-Clio. ISBN 9781851096725.
- Wernham, R. B. (1994). The Return of the Armadas: The Last Years of the Elizabethan Wars Against Spain 1595–1603. Oxford: Clarendon Press. ISBN 978-0198204435.
- Wolfe, Michael (2000). Le Traité de Vervins, Collection Roland Mousnier. Presses Paris Sorbonne. ISBN 9782840501404. (in French)
