= Siege of Le Catelet (1595) =

1595 siege

- Part of the Franco-Spanish War (1595–1598)
Date	20–26 June 1595
Location	Le Catelet, Picardy, France 50.003°N 3.245°E
Result	Spanish victory

Belligerents
Kingdom of France	Spain

Commanders and leaders
Unknown	(Spain) Count of Fuentes

Strength
Unknown	5,000

The siege of Le Catelet, also known as the Capture of Le Catelet, took place at the stronghold of Le Catelet, in Picardy, between 20 and 26 June 1595, as part of the French Wars of Religion in the context of the French Wars of Religion. After a short siege, the Spanish forces commanded by the new Governor-General of the Spanish Netherlands, Don Pedro Henríquez de Acevedo, Count of Fuentes (Spanish: Conde de Fuentes), took the French fortress and compelled its garrison to surrender, as part of his offensive of 1595. A few days later, the Count of Fuentes and his forces continued with the offensive and took La Capelle. On 14 July they arrived at Doullens and laid siege to the city.

== See also ==
- Siege of Doullens
- French Wars of Religion
- Catholic League of France
- List of governors of the Spanish Netherlands

== Bibliograpohy ==
- Demarsy, Arthur. La prise de Doullens par les Espagnols en 1595. Paris. 1867. (in French)
- Knecht, Robert J. (1996). The French Wars of Religion 1559–1598. Seminar Studies in History (2nd ed.). New York: Longman. ISBN 0-582-28533-X
- John H. Elliott (2001). Europa en la época de Felipe II, 1559–1598. Barcelona: Editorial Crítica. ISBN 978-8-48432-243-6 (in Spanish)
- R. B. Wernham. The Return of the Armadas: The Last Years of the Elizabethan War against Spain 1595–1603. Oxford University Press. 1994. ISBN 0-19-820443-4
