= Siege of Calais (1596) =

1596 battle

- Part of the Franco-Spanish War (1595–1598)
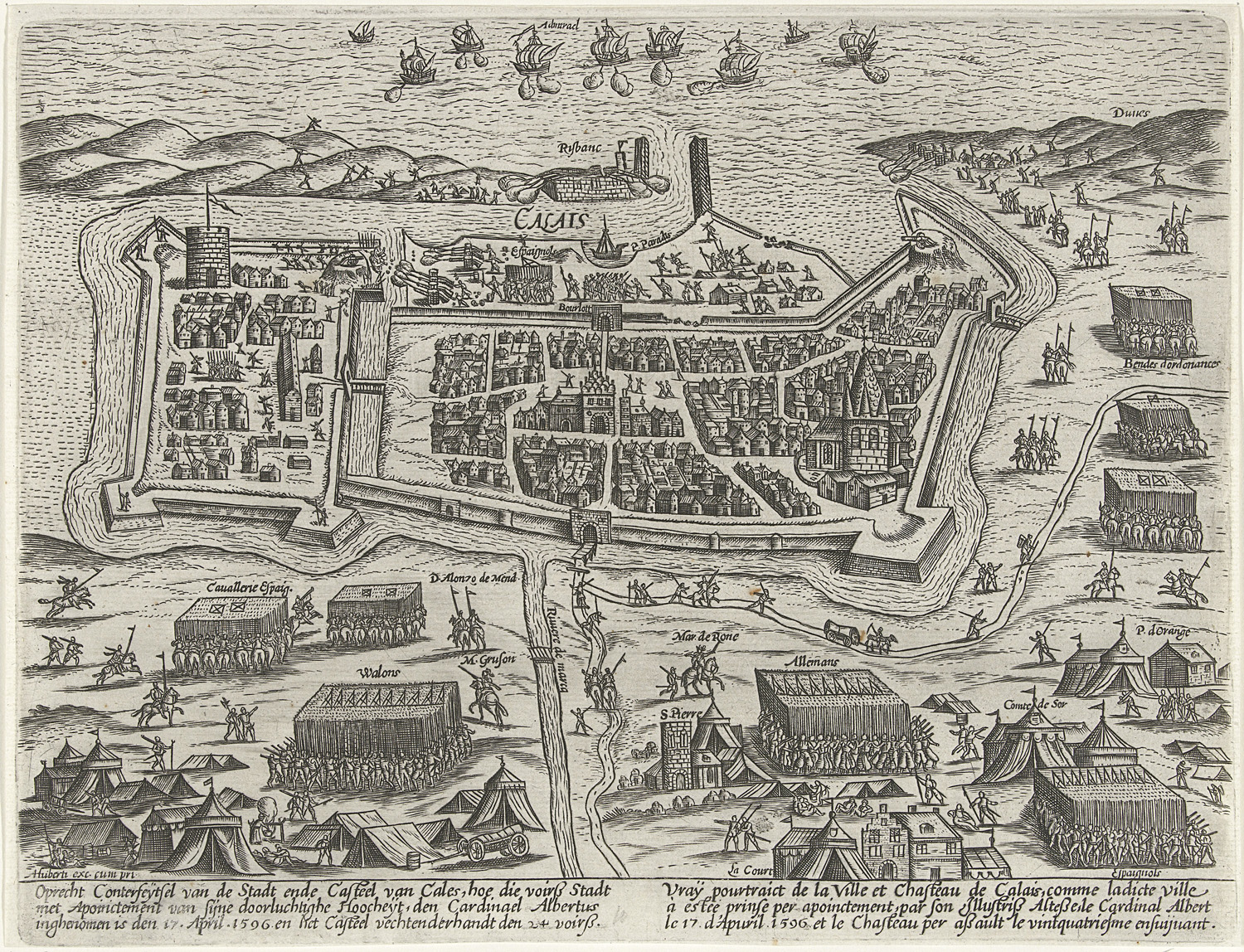
- Engraving the Siege of Calais of 1596 – collection Rijksmuseum Amsterdam
Date	8–24 April 1596
Location	Calais, France 50.9481°N 1.8564°E
Result	Spanish victory

Belligerents
Kingdom of France	(Spain) Spanish Empire

Commanders and leaders
(Kingdom of France) Henry IV of France (Kingdom of France) Sieur de Widessan † (Kingdom of France) François d'Orléans	(Spain) Archduke Albert (Spain) Luis de Velasco (Spain) Carlos Coloma

Strength
Calais: 1,500; Relief forces: Unknown	12,000–15,000

Casualties and losses
Unknown	Unknown

The siege of Calais of 1596, also known as the Spanish conquest of Calais, took place at the strategic port-city of Calais (present-day northern France), between 8 and 24 April 1596, as part of the Franco-Spanish War (1595–1598), in the context of the French Wars of Religion. The siege ended when the city fell into Spanish hands after a short and intense siege by the Spanish Army of Flanders commanded by Archduke Albert of Austria, Governor-General of the Spanish Netherlands (Spanish: Alberto de Austria). The French troops in the citadel of Calais resisted for a few days more but finally, on 24 April, the Spanish troops led by Don Luis de Velasco y Velasco, Count of Salazar, assaulted and captured the fortress, achieving a complete victory. The Spanish success was the first action of the campaign of Archduke Albert of 1596.

== Background ==
Since 1562, France had been in the grip of the French Wars of Religion in which Spain had regularly intervened in favour of the Catholic League of France, most notably in the Sieges of Paris (1590) and Rouen (1591), the Battle of Craon (1592), and the Relief of Blaye (1593). But only in 1595 was war officially declared between the two countries by the new King Henry IV of France (French: Henri de Bourbon), who had the year before converted to Catholicism and been received into Paris to be crowned.

Henry IV was attempting to reconquer large parts of northern France from hostile Spanish-Catholic League forces. In 1595, the Spanish army led by Don Pedro Henríquez de Acevedo, Count of Fuentes, took the initiative, conquering a great number of French towns, castles, and villages, including Doullens. In November 1595, the French army led by Henry IV laid siege to La Fère, under control of the Spanish forces.

After the death of Archduke Ernest of Austria at Brussels, on 20 February 1595, Archduke Albert was sent by Philip II of Spain to Brussels from the Spanish court in Madrid to succeed his elder brother as Governor-General of the Spanish Netherlands. He made his entry in Brussels on 11 February 1596, and his priority was the conflict with Henry IV of France. On 29 March, Albert left Brussels and went to Valenciennes, where he met the forces of the Spanish Army of Flanders, and advanced into France in late March, but instead of relieving La Fère, it turned towards Calais, where it arrived on 8 April.

== Siege of Calais ==
=== Port-city of Calais ===
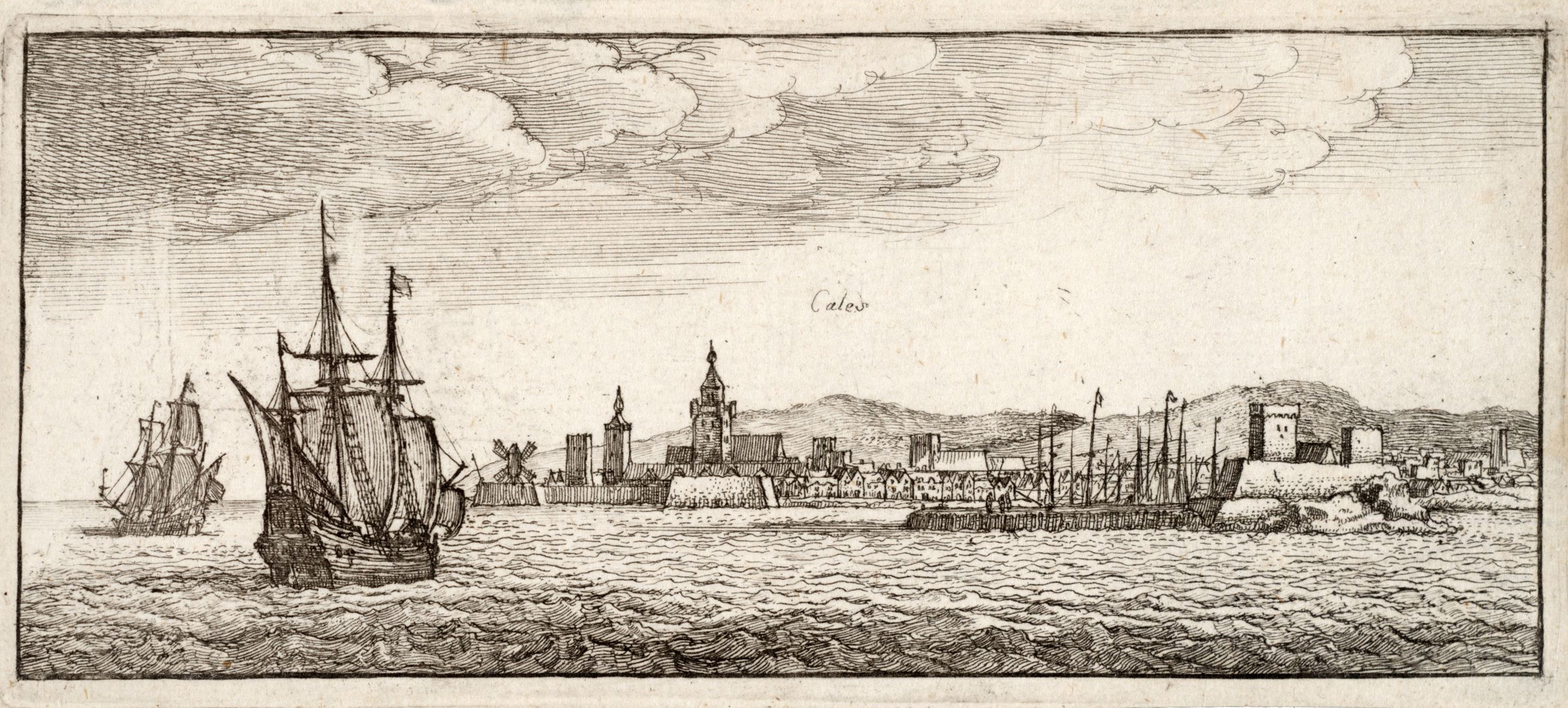
Port-city of Calais by Wenceslaus Hollar. Thomas Fisher Rare Book Library.

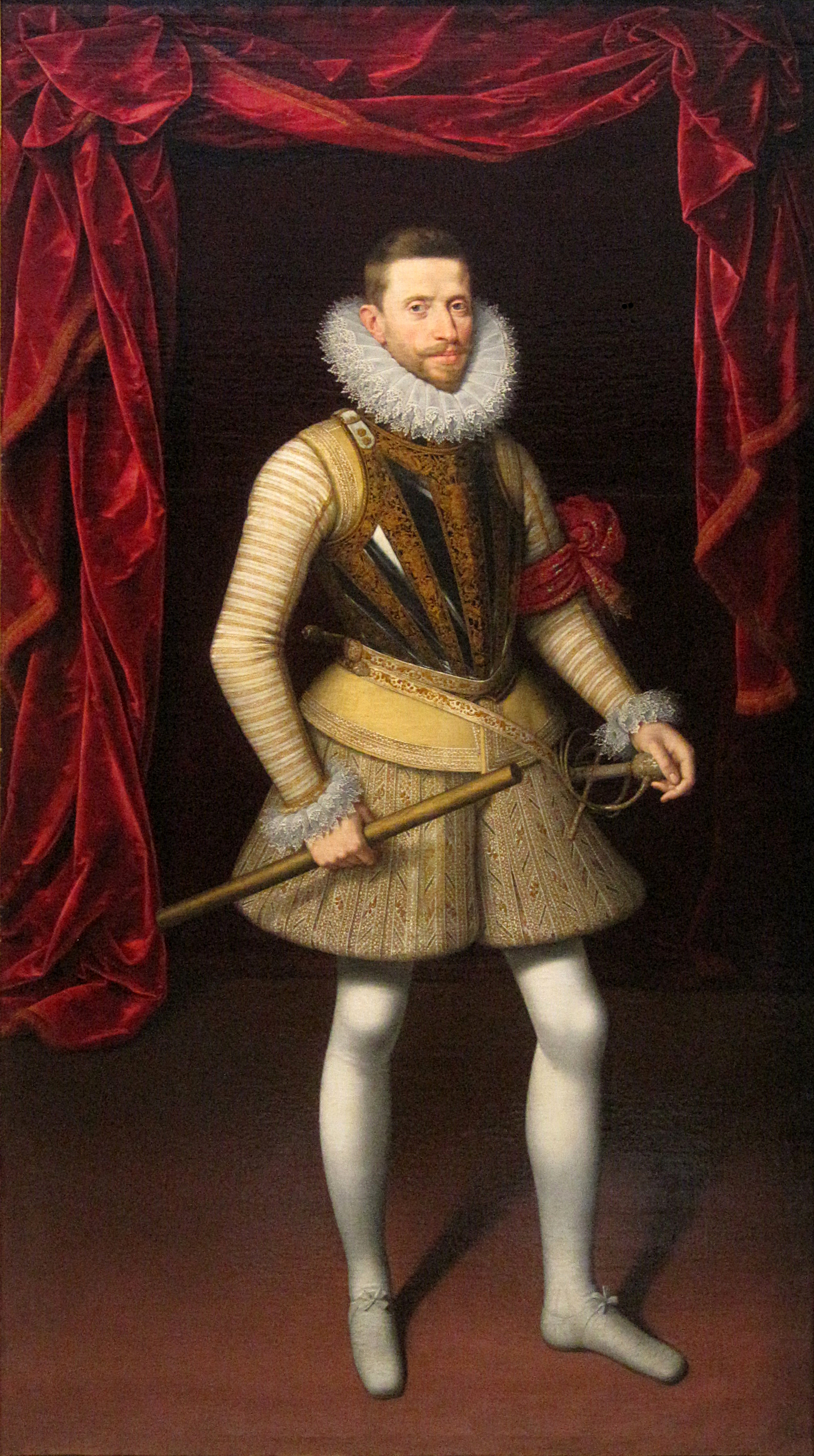
Archduke Albert, Governor-General of the Spanish Netherlands, by Frans Pourbus.

The French troops at Calais were taken completely by surprise by the Spanish forces led by Archduke Albert. Henry was on the point of capturing the town of La Fère, in Picardy, from the Catholic League of France and their Spanish allies after a long and costly siege, and couldn't spare any troops to relieve Calais, and his English and Dutch allies reacted too slowly. Queen Elizabeth of England proposed sending her favourite commander at that time, Sir Robert Devereux, Earl of Essex, with 6,000 to 8,000 soldiers to support the French defenders in Calais, but Elizabeth demanded of Henry that Calais should return to English rule after her intervention. However, while the two monarchs bickered, the work of Spanish troops was crucial, which made it impossible for the English to help. Moreover, Maurice of Nassau, Prince of Orange (Dutch: Maurits van Oranje), on hearing the news, hurried to Zeeland to prepare a relief army and a fleet to relieve Calais, but the city fell the day that the first Dutch ships were preparing to sail.

=== Relief forces ===
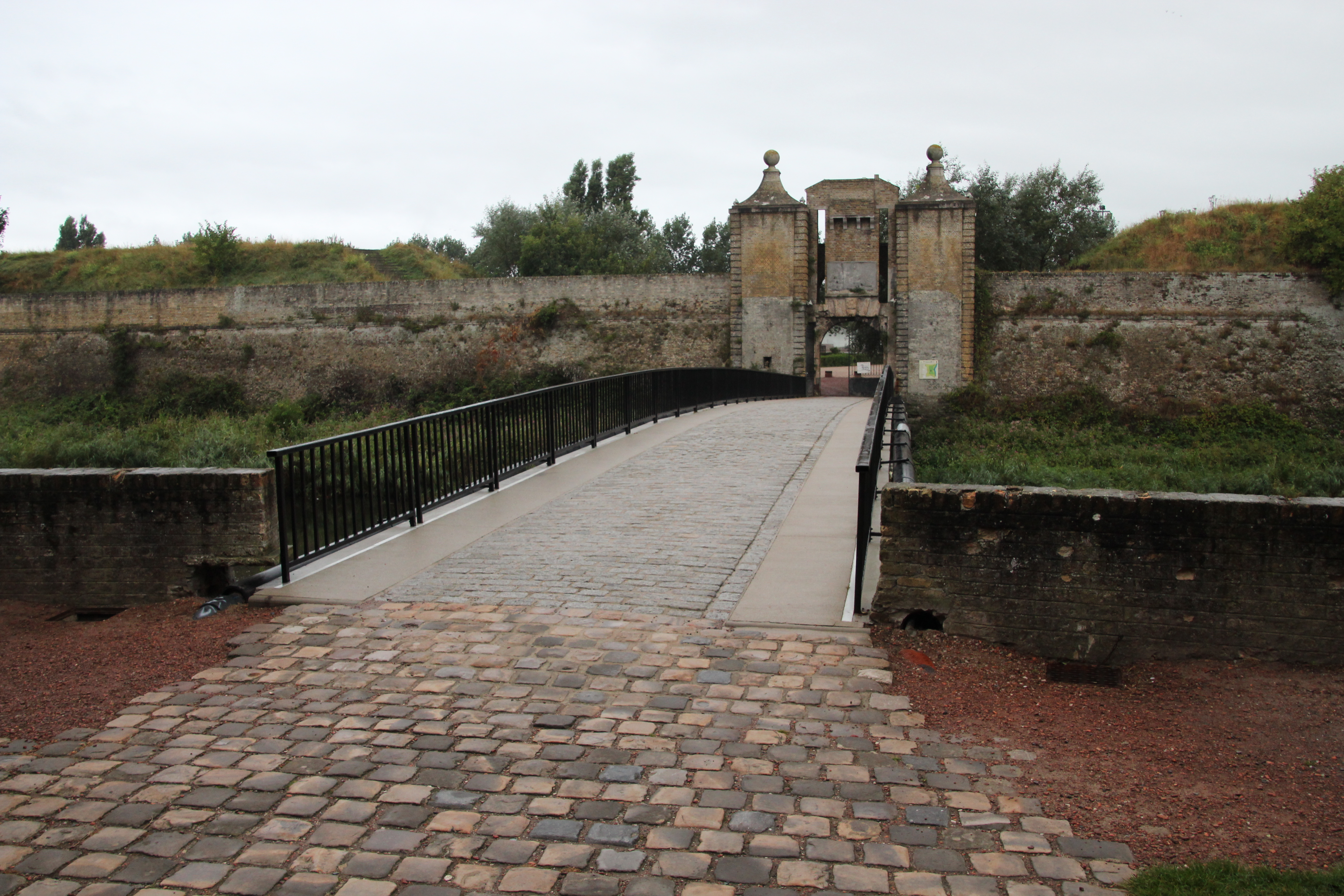
Photograph of La Porte de Neptune. Citadel of Calais

The city fell to the Spaniards after ten days of siege, after which only the citadel remained in French hands. The French general François d'Orléans-Longueville, Duke of Fronsac and Château-Thierry, tried to break the siege by sea, and help the city with supplies and fresh troops, but was successfully stopped by the bombardments of the Spanish artillery. Finally Henry IV, knowing the importance of losing one of the most important port cities of France (on 3 August 1347, Calais was conquered by Edward III of England during the Hundred Years' War, becoming a strong English bastion in France, and was under English rule until the French army commanded by Francis, Duke of Guise, reconquered the city on 8 January 1558, and turned to French sovereignty, during the Last Italian War), also tried to relieve the city, and with a great part of his troops, Henry set out to march towards Calais.

=== Citadel of Calais ===
On Wednesday 24 April the Spanish troops led by Don Luis de Velasco stormed the citadel. All fought with great courage, but the French forces could not match the skill and experience of the professional Spanish and Walloon assault force. At the assault died the Spanish captains Juan Álvarez de Sotomayor and Hernando de Isla, and was seriously injured Diego de Durango. The Governor of Calais, Seigneur de Widessan, and some of his captains, were executed. Into the citadel, the Spaniards took a valuable treasure, composed, among other things, of a large amount of gold and silver coins, horses, and a great quantity of gunpowder and supplies. With the capture of the citadel, the whole city was under Spanish control, and the hopes of Henry IV to retain the city under his control vanished.

The capture of the citadel of Calais was the first military action of the collecting cartons of the Flemish artist Jan Snellinck, designed for a series of tapestries known as The battles of Archduke Albert, now owned by Patrimonio Nacional.

== Aftermath ==
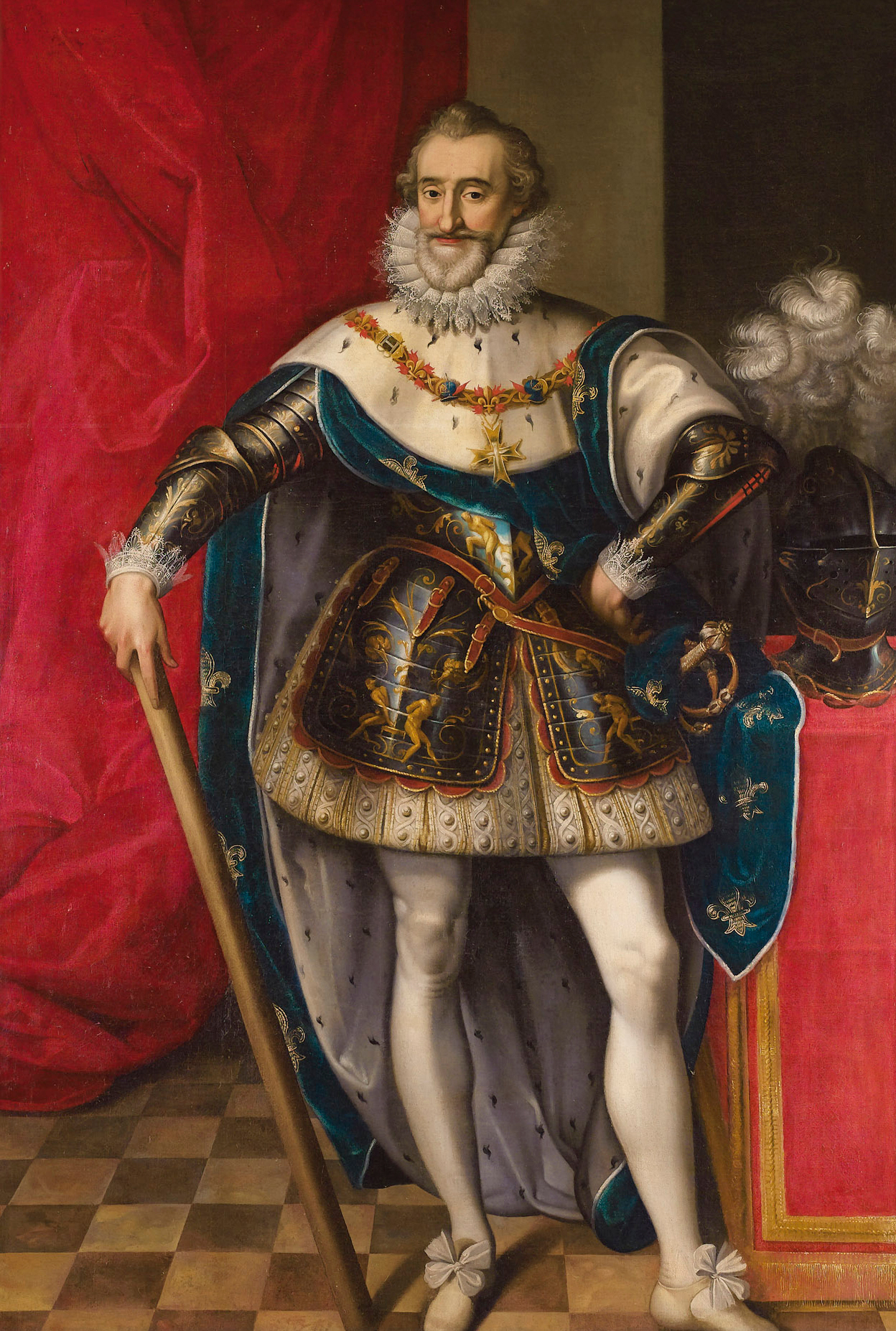
Portrait of Henry IV of France by Frans Pourbus the Younger.

The conquest of the city by the Spanish Army of Flanders, led by Archduke Albert, was a resounding victory and a severe blow to Henry IV of France and his Protestant allies. Calais was of strategic importance, for it gave Spain an excellent port to control the English Channel, along with Dunkirk. Having left behind a strong garrison, Albert advanced with the army to the nearby stronghold of Ardres.

The French defenders offered stiff resistance, but on 23 May were forced to surrender due to the clear superiority of the Spanish forces. The day before the Spanish capture of Ardres, La Fère finally fell to Henry IV's troops, after an honorable surrender of the Spanish-Catholic League troops commanded by Don Álvaro de Osorio. The next target of Albert was Hulst, on the Dutch front. In the middle of July, the assault on the town was launched, and Hulst capitulated to the Spaniards a little over a month later, despite the efforts of Prince Maurice of Nassau to relieve the city.

Calais was under Spanish control for two years and was returned to French control after the Peace of Vervins in 1598.

== See also ==
- Siege of Calais (1558)
- Siege of Doullens
- Battle of the Lippe
- List of governors of the Spanish Netherlands

== Bibliography ==
- Wagner, John A./Walters, Susan. Encyclopedia of Tudor England. Library of Congress Cataloging-in-Publication Data. ISBN 978-1-59884-298-2
- Thomas P. Campbell/Pascal-François Bertrand/Jeri Bapasola. Tapestry in the Baroque: Threads of Splendor. The Metropolitan Museum of Art. 2008.
- Whittemore, Hank. The Monument: By Edward de Vere, 17th Earl of Oxford. London. 1609.
- Knecht, Robert J.. (1996). The French Wars of Religion 1559–1598. Seminar Studies in History (2nd ed.). New York: Longman. ISBN 0-582-28533-X
- Arnold-Baker, Charles. The Companion to British History. First published 1996. ISBN 0-203-93013-4
- Horne, Alistair. Seven Ages of Paris: Portrait of a City. (2003) Pan Books.
- Demarsy, Arthur. La prise de Doullens par les Espagnols en 1595. Paris. 1867. (in French)
- Giménez Martín, Juan. Tercios de Flandes. Ediciones Falcata Ibérica. First edition 1999, Madrid. ISBN 84-930446-0-1 (in Spanish)
- John H. Elliott (2001). Europa en la época de Felipe II, 1559–1598. Barcelona: Editorial Crítica. ISBN 978-8-48432-243-6 (in Spanish)
- Luc Duerloo. Dynasty and Piety: Archduke Albert (1598–1621) and Habsburg Political Culture in an Age of Religious Wars. MPG Books Group. UK. ISBN 2-503-50724-7
- Thomas M McCoog, S. J. The Society of Jesus in Ireland, Scotland, and England, 1589-1597. Printed in Great Britain. MPG Books Group. ISBN 978-1-4094-3772-7
