= Siege of Doullens =

1595 siege

- Part of the Franco-Spanish War (1595–1598)
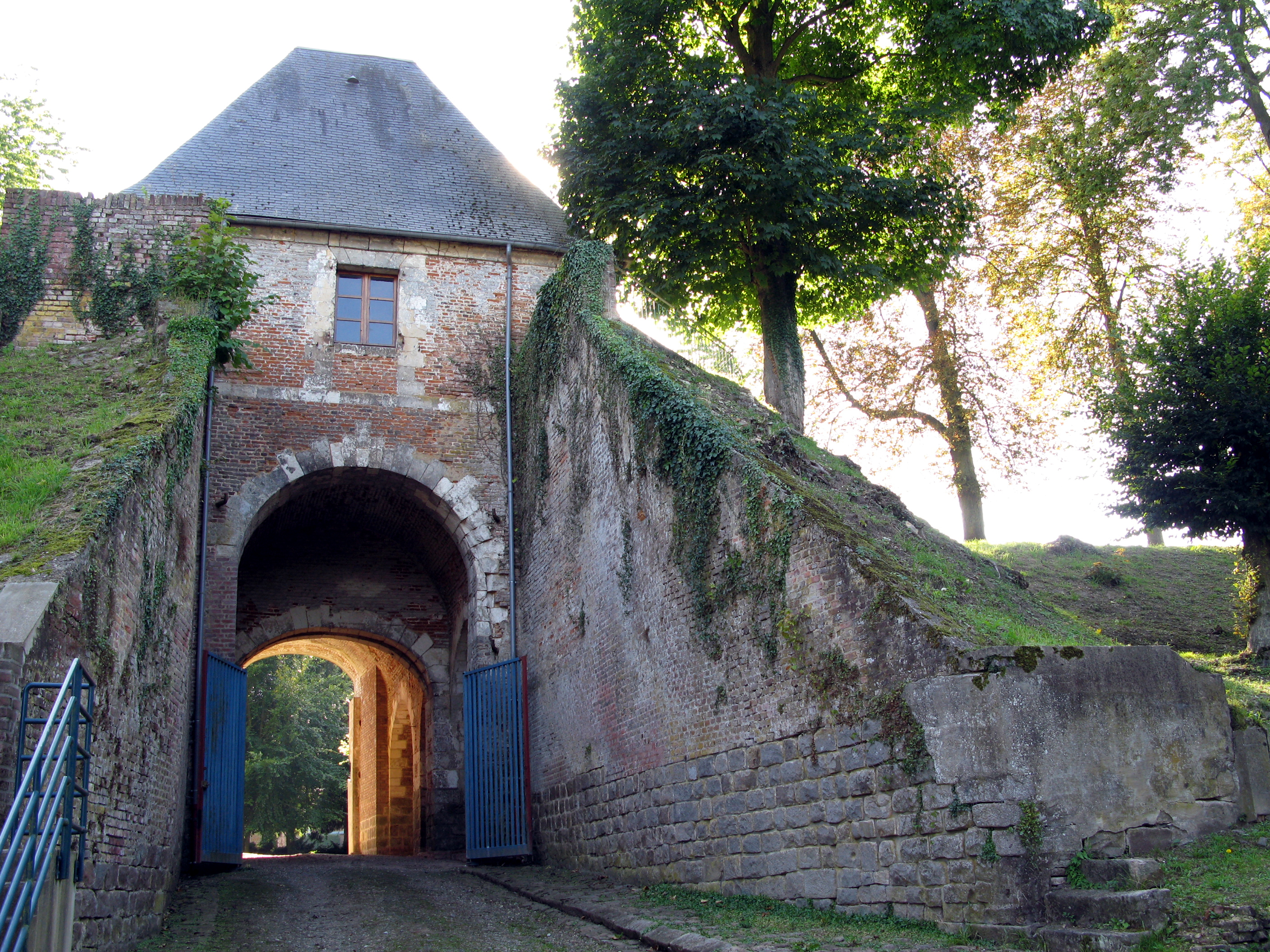
- View of the citadel of Doullens.
Date	14–31 July 1595
Location	Doullens, Picardy, France 50.1575°N 2.3414°E
Result	Spanish victory

Belligerents
Kingdom of France; Huguenots	Spain

Commanders and leaders
(Kingdom of France) Duke of Bouillon (Kingdom of France) François d'Orléans (Kingdom of France) André de Brancas (POW)	(Spain) Count of Fuentes (Spain) Carlos Coloma

Strength
Unknown	8,000

Casualties and losses
At least 6,000 dead or captured	Unknown

The siege of Doullens, also known as the Spanish capture of Doullens or the Storming of Doullens, took place between 14 and 31 July 1595, as part of the Franco-Spanish War (1595–1598), in the context of the French Wars of Religion. After ten days of siege, on 24 July, the combined forces of Henri de La Tour d'Auvergne, Duke of Bouillon, André de Brancas, Amiral de Villars, and François d'Orléans-Longueville, tried to relieve the city, but were severely defeated by the Spanish forces led by Don Pedro Henríquez de Acevedo, Count of Fuentes, and Don Carlos Coloma. Villars was taken prisoner and executed, and the Duke of Bouillon fled to Amiens with the rest of the French army. Finally, a few days after, on 31 July, the Spanish troops stormed Doullens. The Spaniards killed everybody in the city, military and civilians alike, shouting "Remember Ham" (Spanish: "Recordad Ham"), in retaliation for the massacre against the Spanish garrison of Ham by the French and Protestant soldiers under Bouillon's orders.

== Prelude ==
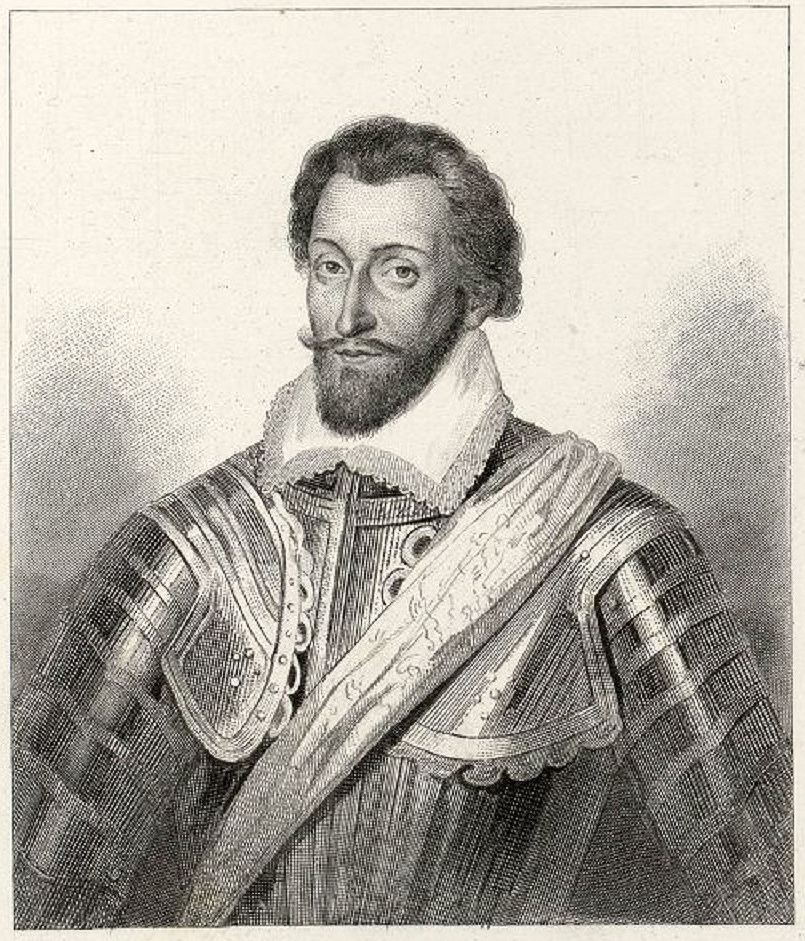
André de Brancas, Amiral de Villars, by Léopold Massard.

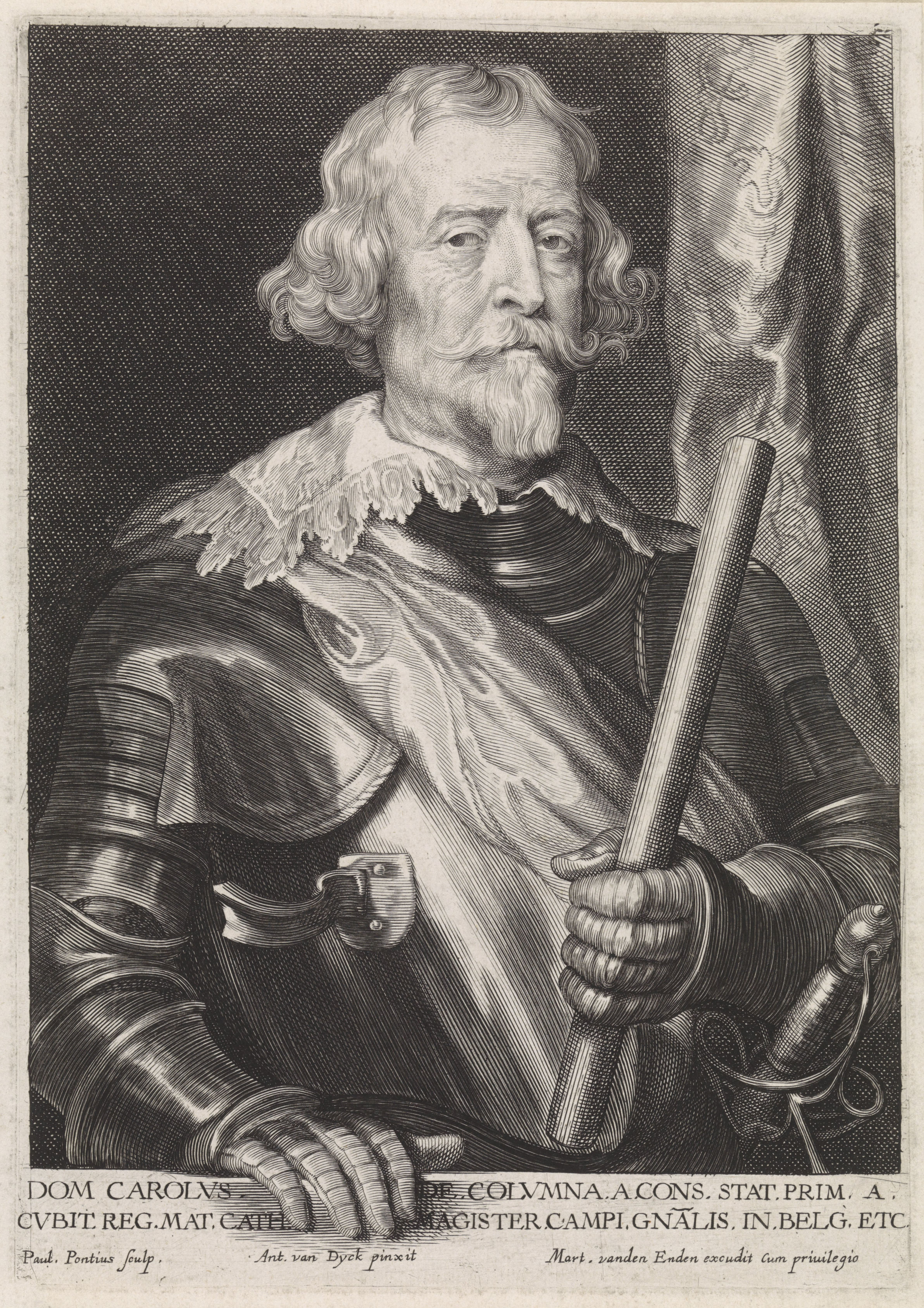
Portrait of Don Carlos Coloma by Anthony van Dyck.

During the French Wars of Religion the Spanish Monarchy, as defender of Catholicism, had intervened regularly in favour of the Catholic League of France, especially in the siege of Paris of 1590, when Henry of Navarre, the future Henry IV of France, was decisively defeated by the combined forces of Spain and the Catholic France. This Catholic success led to the conversion of Henry to Catholicism, declaring that "Paris is well worth a Mass", and finally, with the support of the majority of his Catholic subjects, he was crowned King of France at the Cathedral of Chartres on 27 February 1594. In 1595, Henry IV of France officially declared war against Spain, which was attempting to reconquer large parts of northern France from the hostile Franco-Spanish Catholic forces.

In the Low Countries, after the death of the Archduke Ernest of Austria at Brussels on 20 February 1595, Don Pedro Henríquez de Acevedo, Count of Fuentes, became Governor-General of the Spanish Netherlands, until the arrival of Albert, sent by Philip II of Spain to Brussels to succeed his elder brother.

In June 1595, the Franco-Protestant forces of Henri de La Tour d'Auvergne, Duke of Bouillon and François d'Orléans-Longueville, Duke of Château-Thierry, taking Ham, massacring the small Spanish garrison. Meanwhile, the Count of Fuentes and his forces, 5,000 Spanish troops (4,000 infantry and 1,000 cavalry), advanced over France, capturing Le Catelet. Reinforced by 3,000 more troops from Hainaut and Artois, Fuentes continued with his offensive, and on 14 July, arrived at Doullens and started the siege.

With the news of Doullens, Bouillon and François d'Orléans, Governor of Picardy, joined with the ex-Leaguer André de Brancas, Amiral de Villars, and with the new combined forces, marched to help the besieged city. The French garrison of Doullens, unlike Le Catelet, hoping that reinforcements would arrive soon, prepared a good defense. On July 16, Valentín Pardieu de la Motte, one of the Spanish commanders, while studying the defences of Doullens, was killed by a lucky shot.

== Battle ==
On 24 July, the French forces arrived near Doullens. Villars, at the head of the French relief army, rushed to relieve the town instead of waiting for the reinforcements of Louis Gonzaga, Duke of Nevers. Fuentes positioned part of his army, about 2,000 to 3,000 men, under Don Carlos Coloma, to intercept the French forces. Villars launched a reckless cavalry attack against the Spaniards, creating confusion among the Spanish troops, but was repelled without much trouble, causing heavy casualties to the French. Then the French troops were surrounded by the Spaniards, and Fuentes punished them severely, massacring their infantry and capturing their munitions, equipment, flags, and supplies. Villars was taken prisoner, and despite offering to pay ransom for his life, was executed by a shot through the head.

Charles Bonaventure de Longueval participated in the siege of Doullens, Picardy, France in 1595. The siege of Doullens, also known as the Spanish capture of Doullens or the storming of Doullens, took place between 14 and 31 July 1595, as part of the Franco-Spanish War (1595-1598), in the context of the French Wars of Religion. On 31 July, the Spanish troops stormed Doullens. The Spaniards killed everybody in the city, military and civilians alike, shouting "Remember Ham", in retaliation for the massacre against the Spanish garrison of Ham by the French and Protestant soldiers under Bouillon's orders. With Doullens secured, and reinforced with 1,500 men under Charles Bonaventure de Longueval, Count of Bucquoy, Fuentes advanced with the bulk of the army over the important fortress-city of Cambrai. Doullens was under Spanish control until the Peace of Vervins in 1598. The military and civilian population, about 3000-4000, were killed and their bodies thrown over the walls into pits; and this situation created a plague. Not all were killed. It is unknown how many nobles were spared and released after paying a ransom; however, Charles de Longueval and his brother Jean-Antoine de Longueval were spared and taken to the residence of their 3rd cousin Charles-Bonaventure de Longueval in Amiens. Charles de Longueval was wounded by a shot and died two weeks later, about August 15, 1595. His brother Jean-Antoine de Longueval was killed at the siege of Amiens two years later, in 1597.

This defeat reduced further the King's forces in Picardy, and the Duke of Bouillon fled to Amiens with what was left of the French army.

=== Storming of Doullens ===
Fuentes now turned against Doullens again, and after two failed attempts, took the city on July 31. Shouting "Remember Ham", the Spaniards killed everybody in the city, military and civilians alike, in revenge for the massacre against the Spanish-Catholic garrison of Ham by the French and Protestant soldiers under the Duke of Bouillon. Between 3,000 and 4,000 people died in a few hours.

== Consequences ==
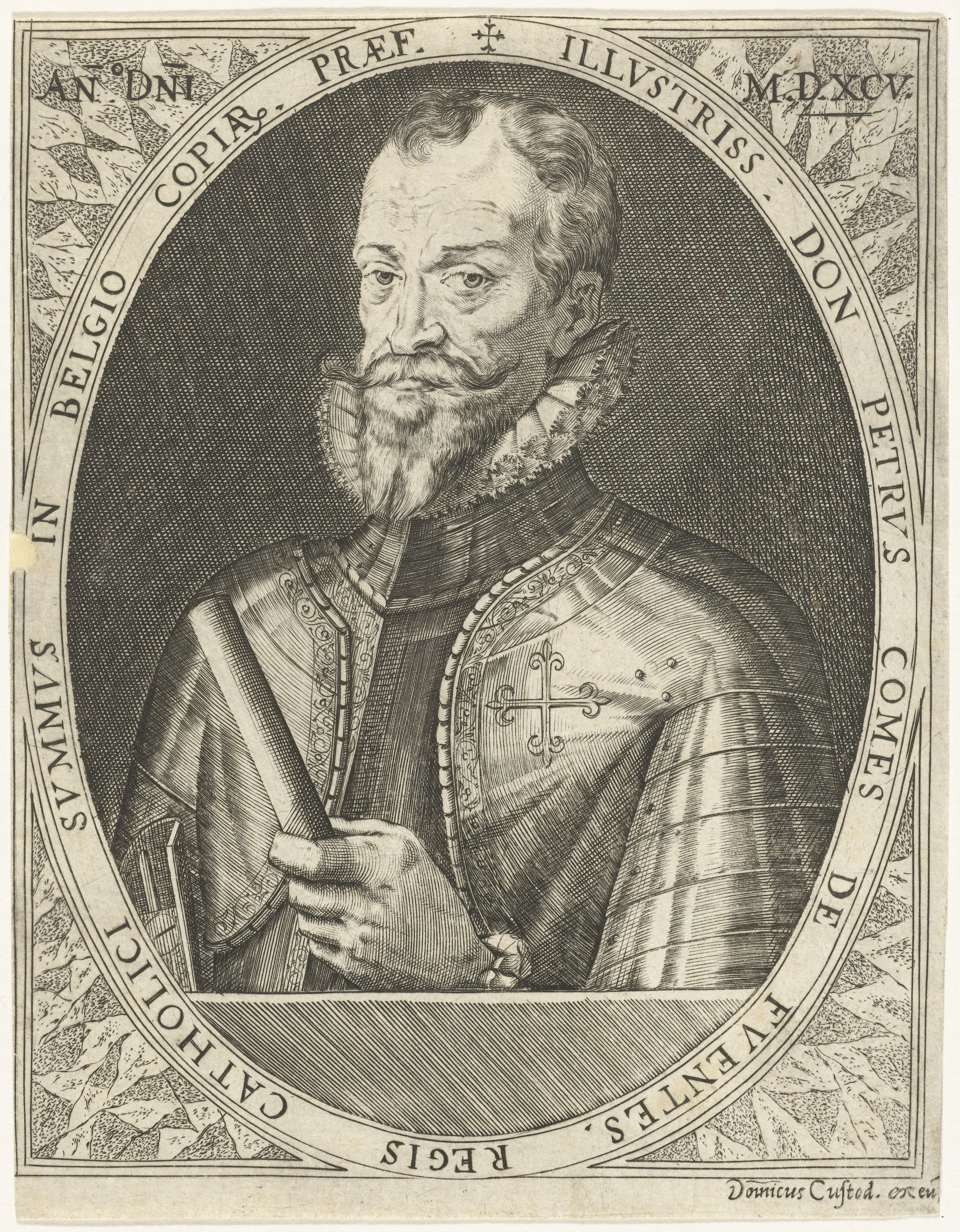
Portrait of Don Pedro Henríquez de Acevedo, Count of Fuentes.

With Doullens secured, and reinforced with 1,500 men under Charles Bonaventure de Longueval, Count of Bucquoy, Fuentes advanced with the bulk of the army over the important fortress-city of Cambrai. Henry IV, who was in Lyon, was determined to save the city at all costs, but the precarious economic situation of Henry made it impossible to gather a relief army. He even appealed to the United Provinces for armed assistance, but the response was very slow. After a heavy bombardment, the Spanish troops captured the city. The Governor of Cambrai, Jean de Monluc, Seigneur de Balagny, retired to the citadel, but surrendered on 7 September.

Doullens was under Spanish control until the Peace of Vervins in 1598.

== See also ==
- French Wars of Religion
- Siege of Calais (1596)
- Catholic League of France
- List of governors of the Spanish Netherlands

== Bibliography ==
- R. B. Wernham. The Return of the Armadas: The Last Years of the Elizabethan War against Spain 1595–1603. Oxford University Press. 1994. ISBN 0-19-820443-4
- Horne, Alistair. Seven Ages of Paris: Portrait of a City. (2003) Pan Books.
- Demarsy, Arthur. La prise de Doullens par les Espagnols en 1595. Paris. 1867. (in French)
- Knecht, Robert J. (1996). The French Wars of Religion 1559–1598. Seminar Studies in History (2nd ed.). New York: Longman. ISBN 0-582-28533-X
- René de La Croix; de Castries, duc (1979). The Lives of the Kings & Queens of France. New York: Alfred A. Knopf. ISBN 0-394-50734-7
- John H. Elliott (2001). Europa en la época de Felipe II, 1559–1598. Barcelona: Editorial Crítica. ISBN 978-8-48432-243-6 (in Spanish)
- Luc Duerloo. Dynasty and Piety: Archduke Albert (1598–1621) and Habsburg Political Culture in an Age of Religious Wars. MPG Books Group. UK. ISBN 2-503-50724-7
- Declercq, Nico F. (2021). "Chapter 18.3.18: The Siege of Le Catelet, Doullens and Cambrai - Summer of 1595". The Desclergues of la Villa Ducal de Montblanc. pp. 228–229. ISBN 9789083176901.
