= Charles de Gontaut, 1st Duke of Biron =

French governor and military commander (1562-1602)

Charles de Gontaut
- 1st Duke of Biron
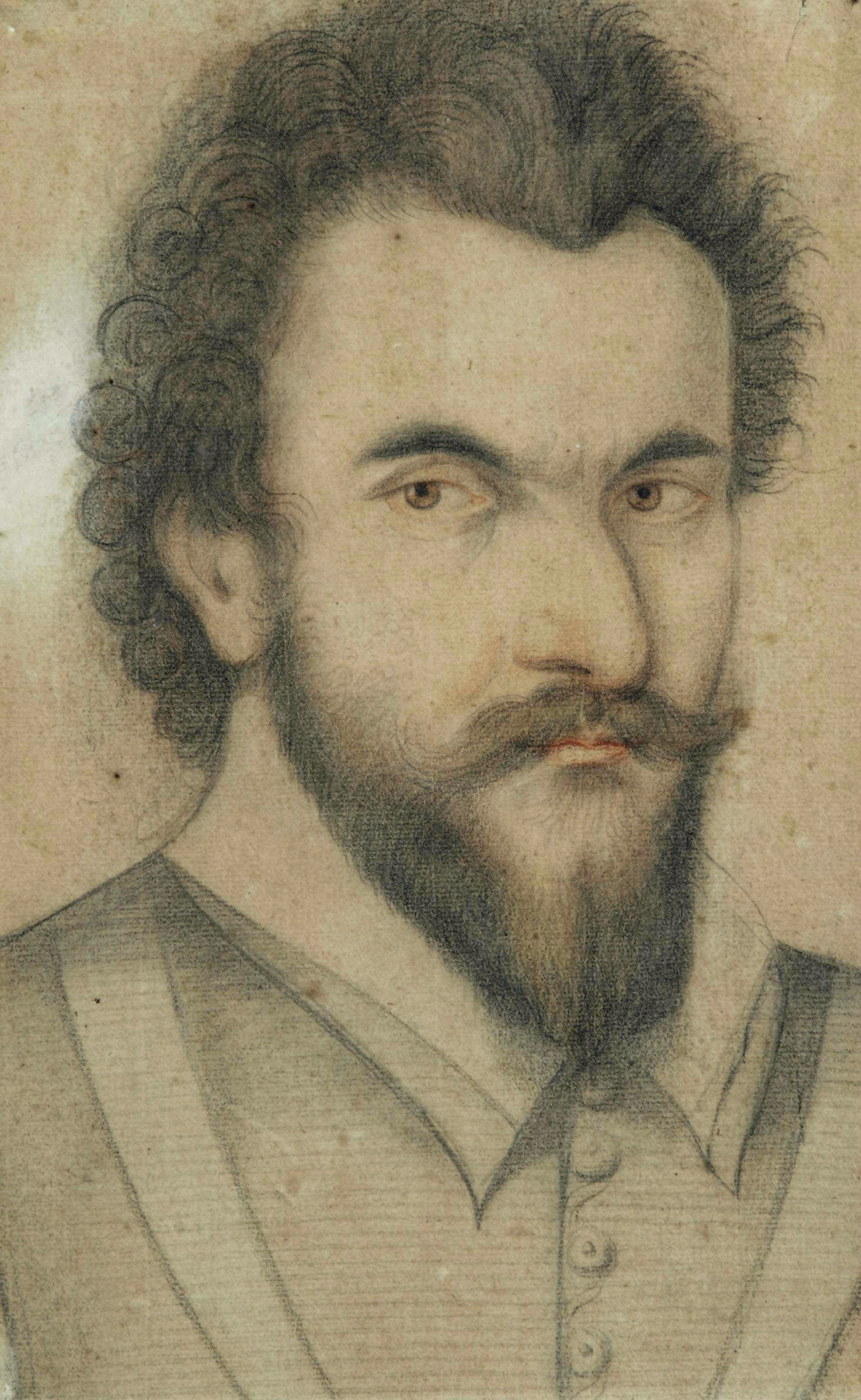
- Sketch of the duke from the circle of Daniel Dumonstier.

- Coat of arms
- Other titles: Marshal of France; Admiral of France; Governor of Burgundy
- Born: 1562; Kingdom of France
- Died: 31 July 1602 (aged 39–40); Bastille, Kingdom of France
- Family: Famille de Gontaut
- Father: Armand de Gontaut, Baron of Biron
- Mother: Jeanne, dame d'Ornezan

Charles de Gontaut, 1st Duke of Biron (1562 – 31 July 1602) was a French noble, military commander, Admiral of France, Marshal of France, and governor of Burgundy during the final days of the French Wars of Religion. The son of Marshal Armand de Gontaut, Baron of Biron who had served the crown militarily throughout the religious wars, Biron made his entry into French politics in the late 1580s.

Initially a follower of the chief royal favourite Épernon by 1589 he was a candidate to become Admiral of France. In August 1589 Henry III of France was assassinated, and Biron and his father transferred their loyalties to the Protestant Henry IV of France, putting them at war with the Catholic League. He fought at the royalist victories of Arques and Ivry in late 1589 and early 1590, during which he developed a reputation as an exceptional commander.

In 1592 he became Admiral of France, a post he held for two years, before being compelled to trade it for the title of Marshal so that the former title could be offered to a rebel. In 1593 Biron invaded Burgundy, and succeeded in capturing many villages, but was unable to secure any major cities. In 1595 he again invaded Burgundy with considerably more success, Beaune, Auxonne, Autun and finally Dijon falling to him in late May of that year. During the campaign, Henry granted him the governate of Burgundy. A Spanish army under the Constable of Castilla invaded in response and joined forces with the duke of Mayenne, lieutenant-general of the League. Having called on Henry for support, Biron and his king defeated the Constable and duke against the odds at the Battle of Fontaine-Française.

This largely marked the end of the domestic civil war, as the conflict transformed into an international one against Spain. In 1597 Biron led the successful siege of Amiens, the city having recently been taken by surprise by the Spanish. He signed the Treaty of Vervins with the Spanish the following year. He was then tasked with making war on the duke of Savoy which he conducted for the next few years, seeing continued success. Around this time, he began to be courted by the Savoyard duke, who saw in his tense relations with Henry the potential for a useful defection. According to the testimony of Jacques de La Fin, Biron entered a formal treaty to betray Henry in 1600, by whose terms he would be established as a largely independent ruler of Burgundy under the overall authority of the Spanish, in return for his betrayal of Henry. No such treaty has however ever been found.

In January 1601 France made peace with Savoy in the Treaty of Lyon, by the terms of which France traded their former possession of Saluzzo for a collection of other territories. Biron was established as governor of these, but a fortress he had to fight particularly bitterly for was granted to a Protestant governor, embittering him. Shortly thereafter, Biron confessed to Henry that in the heat of the moment after this he had entertained treasonous thoughts. Henry forgave him for this, and dispatched him on a diplomatic mission.

In March 1602 La Fin came to Henry, claiming to have evidence that Biron's treason ran far deeper, alleging a treaty had been formed, and that Biron was to have put Henry in line of enemy fire during the prior campaign. Henry believed these accusations, and arranged for Biron to come to court in June. Biron was reluctant but was eventually coaxed into appearing. Repeatedly urged to confess to treason, Biron maintained his innocence. He was convicted by the Paris Parlement on 27 July, and despite the protests of much of the upper nobility, he was executed at the Bastille on 31 July 1602.

== Early life and family ==
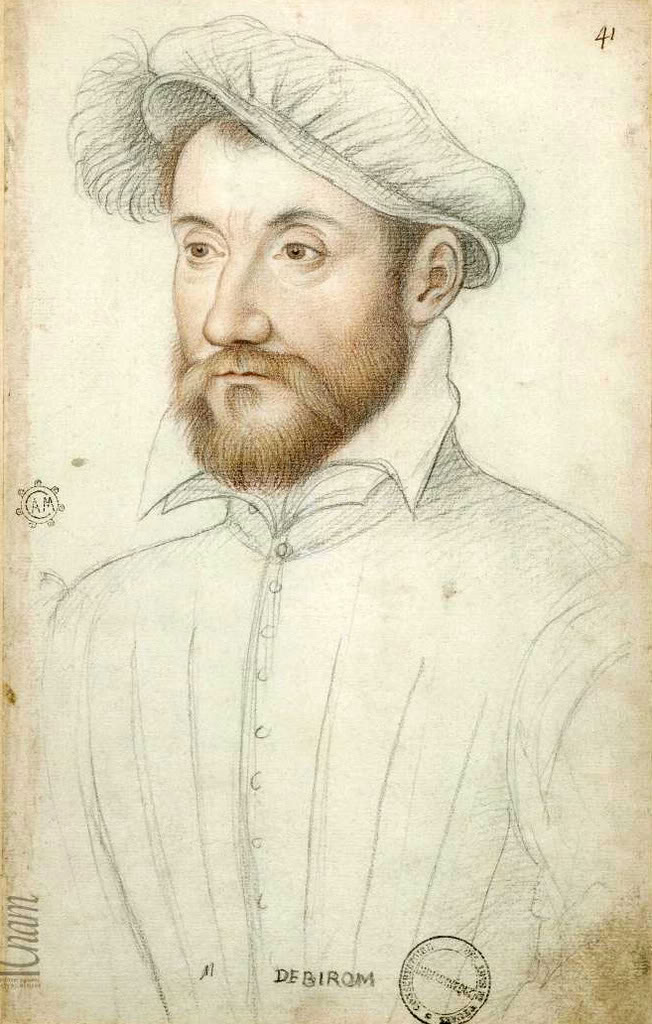
Sketch of Biron's father Armand de Gontaut

Charles de Gontaut was born in 1562, the eldest son of the Catholic Armand de Gontaut, Baron of Biron and Protestant Jeanne, dame d'Ornezan. His father served the king throughout the French Wars of Religion seeing service at the siege of La Rochelle in 1573 and continuing his service through the following decades as a Marshal.

His father was killed in July 1592 while conducting the siege of Épernay.

== Reign of Henry III ==
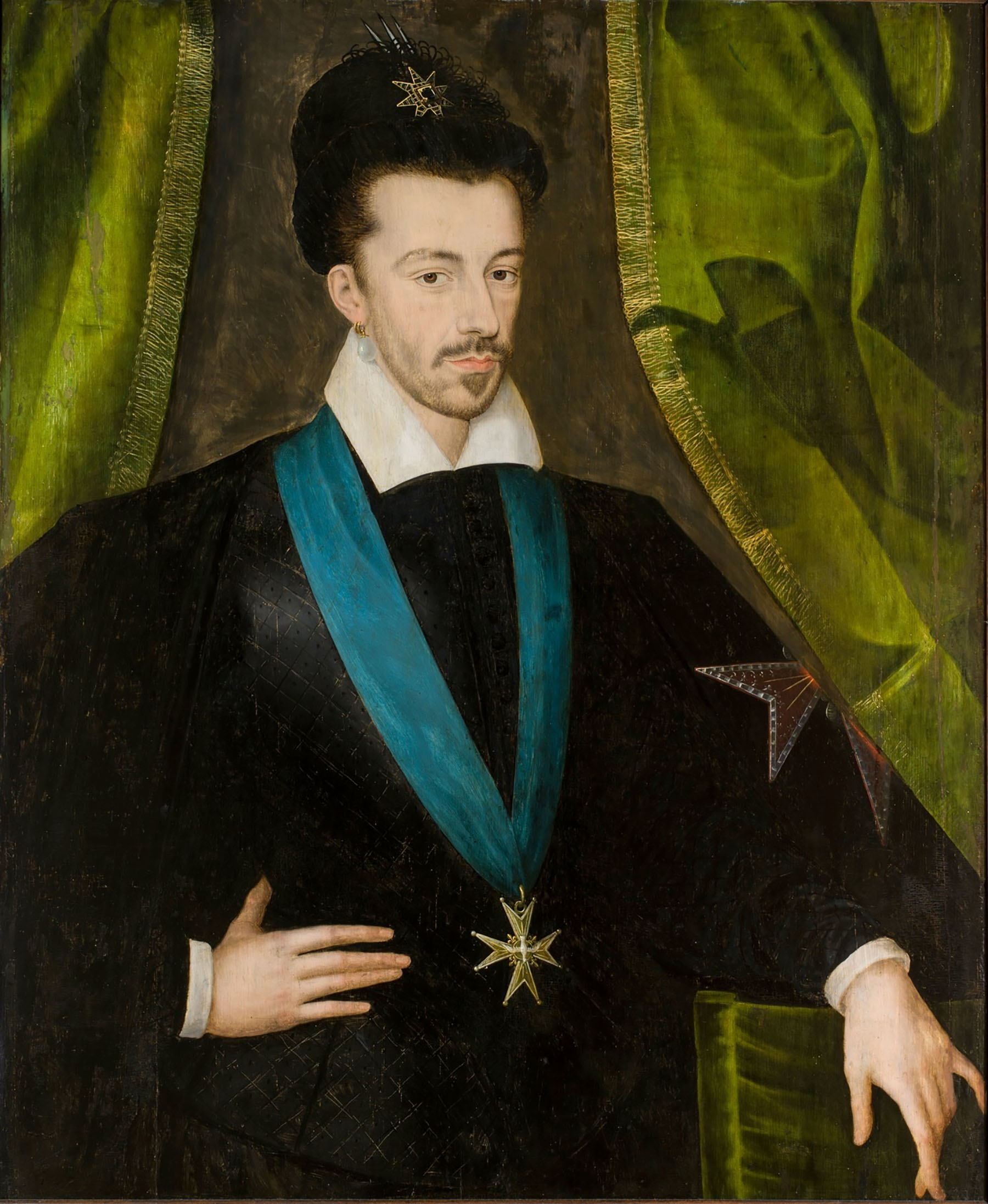
Henry III of France

In 1586 Biron was involved in a major duel with La Vauguyon, a great noble of Limousin over the prospect of being able to marry Anne de Caumont. Several men were killed in the duel.

At court he became a follower of the chief royal favourite the duke of Épernon, joining his Gascon entourage. To reward those in his orbit, Épernon provided an income of 200 écus.

In early 1589, La Valette was forced to yield the office of Admiral. His initial choice to succeed him was Biron, however it was instead granted to the royal favourite, the marquis de Beauvais-Nangis. In 1592 the office was transferred from him to Biron in line with La Valette's original vision.

== Reign of Henry IV ==
=== Loyalist ===
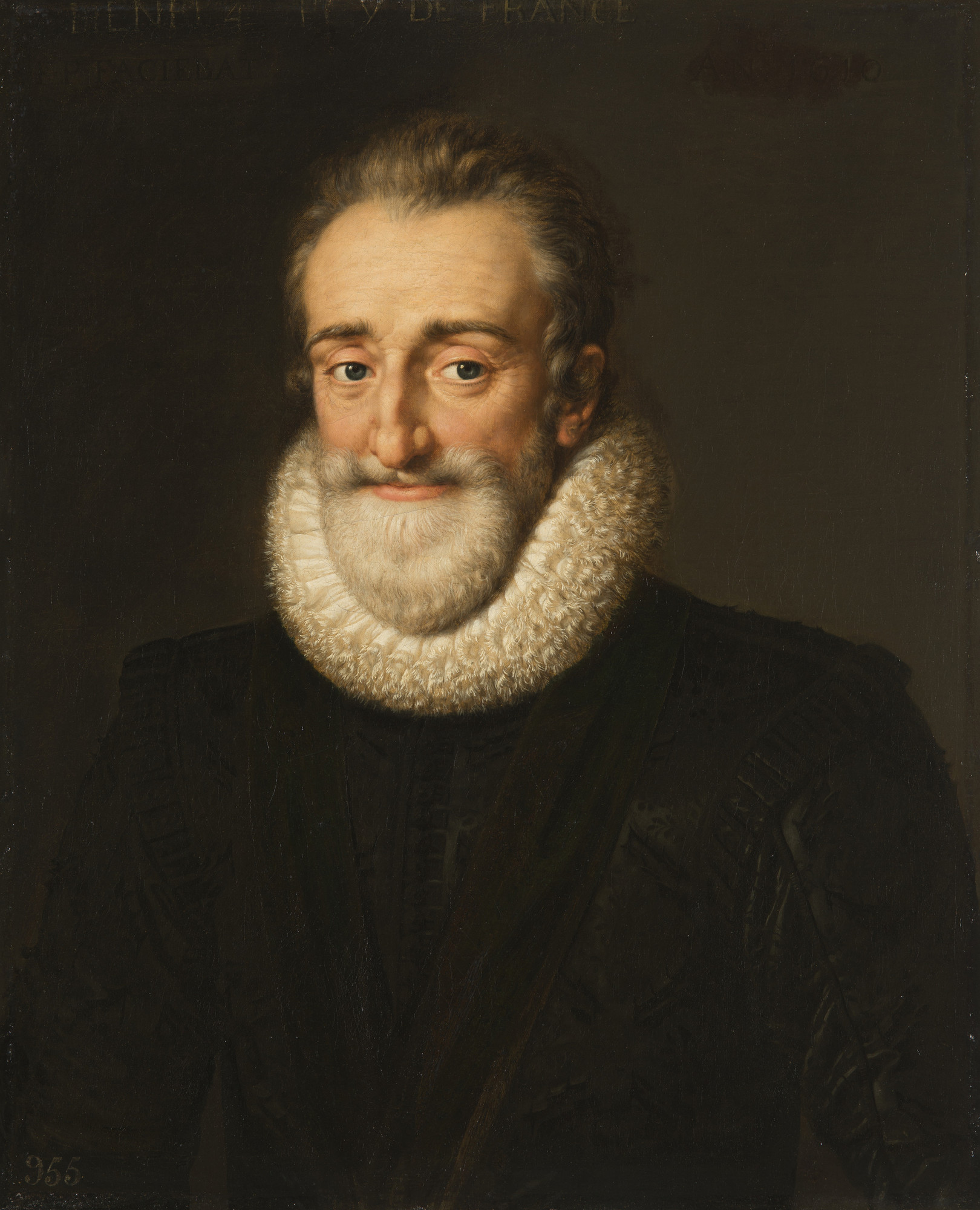
Henry IV of France

Upon the assassination of Henry III in August 1589, Biron and his father quickly transferred their loyalties to his Protestant heir, Henry III of Navarre, who now styled himself Henry IV. Former loyalists to Henri III such as the Biron, Longueville and Gaspard de Schomberg among others formed the second generation of courtiers Henry IV would rely upon.

=== Ivry ===
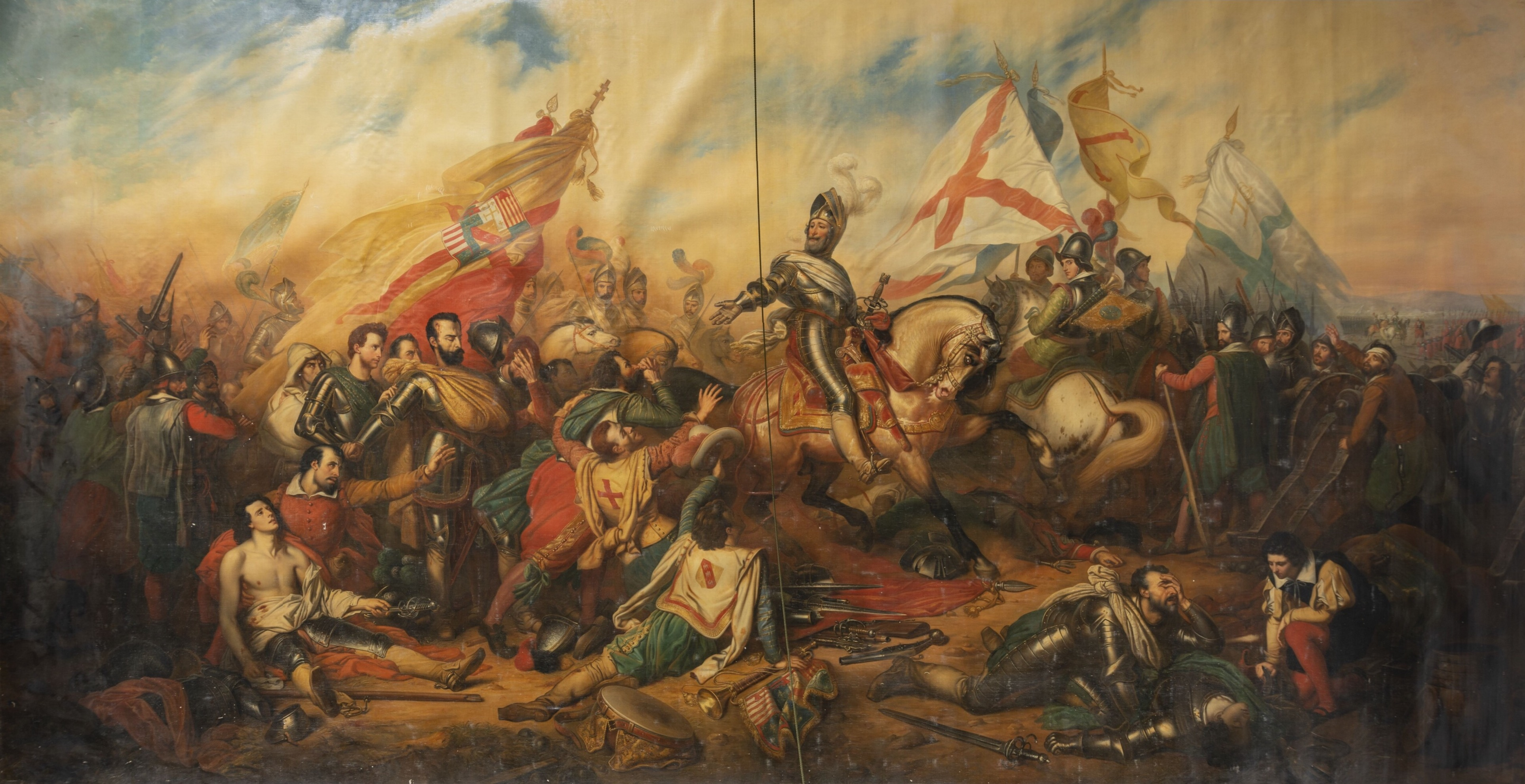
Henry IV at the Battle of Ivry

Biron fought with the royal army against the lieutenant-general of the Catholic League, Mayenne at the victory of Arques in September 1589. Following this victory, Henry advanced towards the capital, near which he faced Mayenne again at Ivry in March 1590. During the battle Biron commanded a cavalry formation alongside the royal bastard the count of Auvergne. The two were opposite the count of Egmont and a contingent of German mercenaries. Egmont initially had success against the royalists, destroying Auvergne's formations, however Biron then charged at the head of his troops, first halting and then reversing Egmont's attack, his formations being scattered with Egmont himself left dead on the field. With victory against Egmont, Biron became involved in an inconclusive struggle with the chevalier d'Aumale before reinforcements under his father Marshal Biron swung the tide. The battle was a decisive royalist victory. He fought at the abortive siege of Paris which followed the victory at Ivry. In these combats he acquired considerable reputation for his military skill.

In early 1593, Biron was in a place of some disenchantment with Henry, and was for a brief time drawn towards the third party at the nascent court, that sought to promote Charles, Cardinal de Bourbon as an alternate candidate to the throne. In response to these rumblings, Henry accelerated his plans to convert to Catholicism.

=== First campaign into Burgundy ===
Biron led a campaign for Henry into Burgundy in late 1593, with considerable success. After 20 villages had fallen to him the authorities of Dijon wrote in panic to Mayenne urging him to come and protect the city from Biron. Ultimately, Biron did not capture any major cities at this time.

=== Marshal Biron ===
Having occupied the post of Admiral for a brief time, Biron was obliged to relinquish it to Villars-Brancas in 1594. This was due to the fact that Villars-Brancas was in command of Rouen, and the Admiralty was one of his several demands for defection. In exchange for yielding the post, Biron was established as a Marshal of France by Henry, just as his father had been. He was further granted a monetary compensation of 420,000 livres. The Marshal baton had recently been granted to several defectors from the League: La Châtre, Brissac and Boisdauphin.

=== Second invasion of Burgundy ===
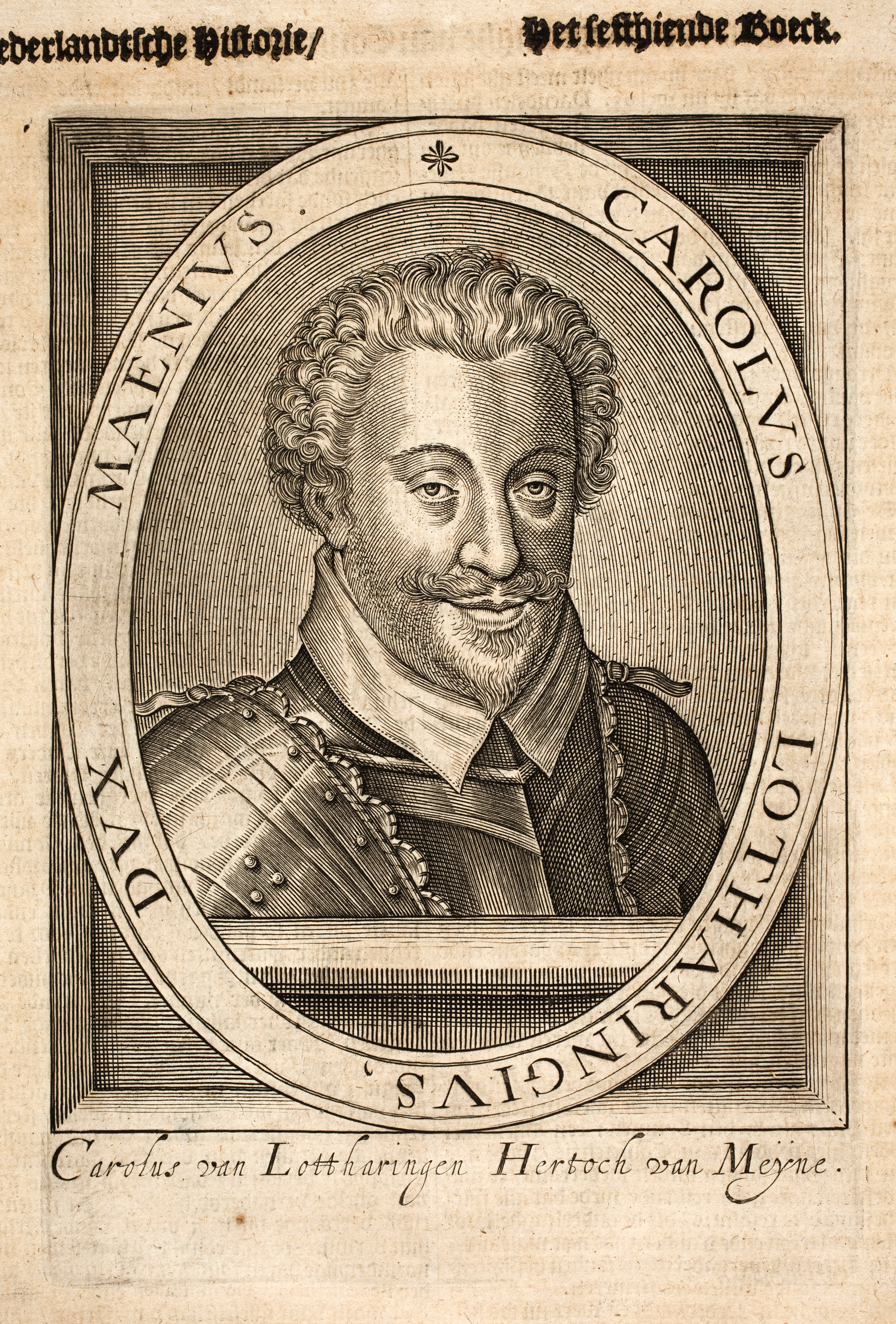
Engraving of Charles de Lorraine, duc de Mayenne. Lieutenant-general of the Catholic League

By the advent of 1595, the war against the Catholic League was entering its final stages. Biron was tasked in January with invading Burgundy, to crush the duke of Mayenne. He swept through the province, with Beaune, Nuits, Auxonne and Autun falling to him in quick succession. Dijon, capital of Burgundy, was defended by Jean de Saulx. Though the post of governor was currently held by Mayenne, Henry considered him to have forfeited his right to the office by his continued resistance to him. Therefore on 20 April 1595 Henry conferred the governate of Burgundy on Biron. This was a heavy blow to the Lorraine family, with the governate they had held since 1543 lost from the family permanently due to Mayenne's intransigence. It proved a strategic choice for Henry, as Mayenne had long built patronage networks in Burgundy that he could rely on to support him.

For a time Henry may have considered establishing a system of creating a system of hereditary fiefs in France, establishing the young duke of Guise as count of Provence, and Biron as count of Périgord. However this did not come to pass.

In late May Biron's troops surrounded Dijon and worked on breaching the walls. Concurrent to the military efforts against the city, Biron conducted negotiations with the local elites to secure the cities surrender. As a result of these negotiations Dijon could not celebrate Corpus Christi day. The terms that he was proposing to the city were continually read aloud to a public assembly.

By June 1595, Dijon had made its submission to Henry, who was sensitive to the urban notables of the city. He therefore was cautious in the impositions he made of the city. For the first year under royalist control half of the échevins were to be selected from a shortlist drawn up by Henry as opposed to their usual appointment by the mayor. He further chose the various captains of the city militia. Biron was charged with explaining the latter innovation to the grandees of Dijon. He stressed that it was his desire to expand the privileges that the city enjoyed. It was a "one time imposition", and the king would soon be in Dijon for them to discuss it with. Henry entered Dijon on 4 June, and went out of his way to demonstrate the veracity of his conversion to Catholicism. After his victory at Fontaine-Française, he arranged a special procession for the consecrated host on 1 July to replace the festivities that Biron had disrupted.

=== Fontaine-Française ===
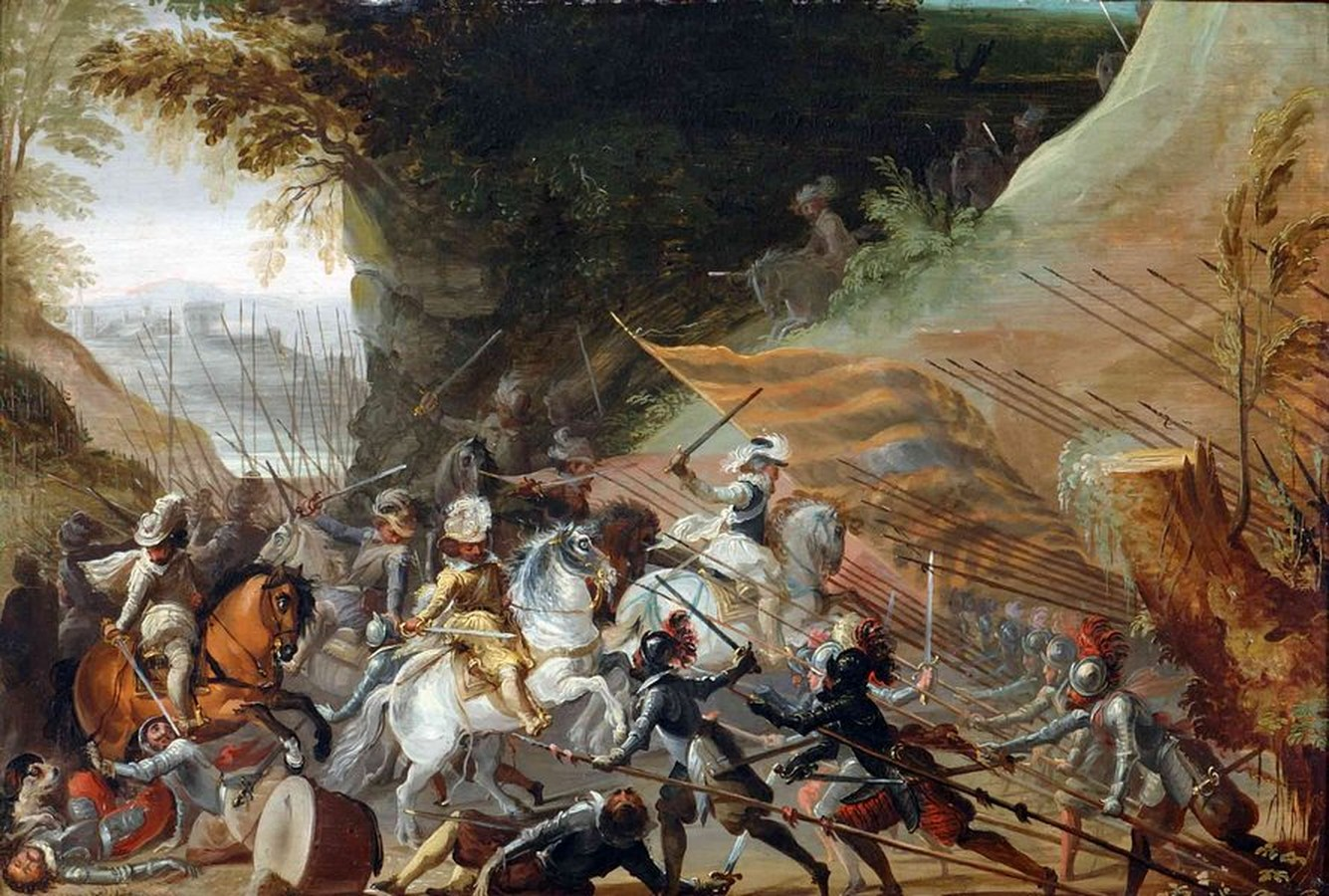
Henry IV leading a charge during the Battle of Fontaine-Française

Biron and Henry did not have time to rest on their laurels in Dijon for long however. An army under the Constable of Castilla linked up with Mayenne, and moved to meet the royalists. Biron, fearful that this army was about to advance on Dijon, called on Henry to bring up reinforcements. Having linked with Biron, the two probed at the advancing enemy, which for the moment far outnumbered them, stumbling into battle at Fontaine-Française on 5 June.

Despite being heavily outnumbered, Henry refused to countenance a retreat, and he and Biron led two successful defences against assaults from the enemy before starting a counterattack. Mayenne urged the Constable to engage his entire army, but he was cautious, suspecting Henry would not dare attack unless he had far greater forces in the area. With this victory Mayenne could no longer maintain his presence in Bourgogne. Henry was ecstatic at the victory, and was generous in his praise towards Biron and other nobleman in his ranks. Soon thereafter Mayenne came to terms with Henr.

Henry was true to the word he had given the people of Dijon, and maintained distance from the elections of the city in the coming years. The Parlement of Dijon was less interested in maintaining distance, and after the victory of the former League member, Bernard Coussin in 1598 with 72% of the vote the Parlement sought to change the electoral process. Henceforth the mayor was to be selected by lot from the top three candidates. Coussin protested and appealed to Biron to intervene against this. Biron and the city council succeeded in overruling the Parlement, and it was declared that elections would occur "in the traditional format... without any changes, alterations or innovations of any kind".

=== Amiens ===
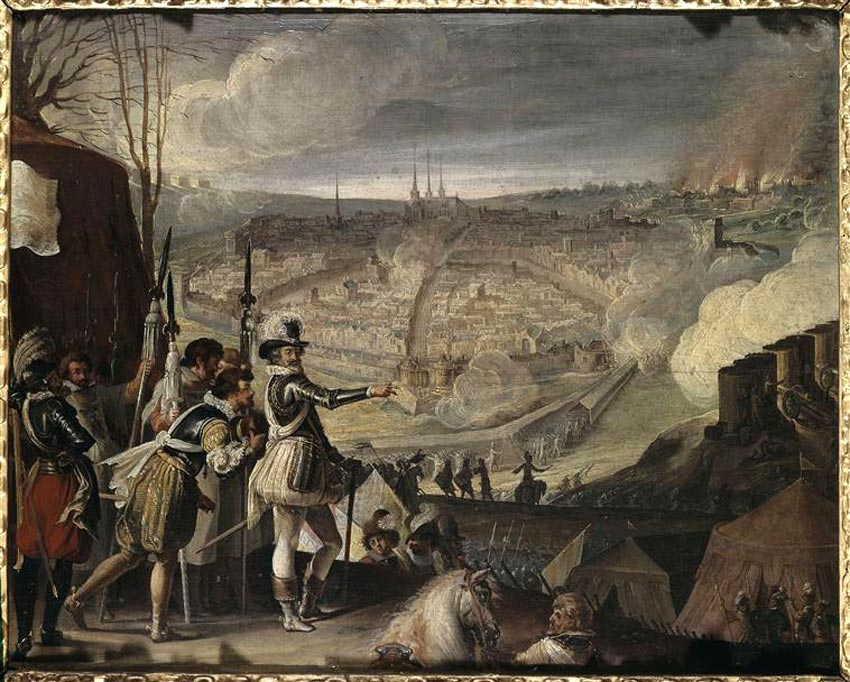
Henry IV during the siege of Amiens

With the League defeated, Henry's attention turned to their chief backer, Spain. Biron led preparations in September 1596 for a campaign into the Spanish Netherlands. To this end military supplies and food were stocked up, however Amiens was conscious that a garrison would infringe upon its traditional liberties and refused the royal presence. The town also neglected to maintain a proper guard or keep its walls in good shape. Therefore, Spain was able to preempt the offensive with a coup of their own, seizing Amiens by surprise on 11 March 1597 without firing a shot. The news of the fall of Amiens fell on the capital like a bombshell.

Biron and Mayenne led the effort that recaptured the city for the French crown. Biron had begun the siege early in April, with an insigificant force of 3000 men, which was outnumbered 2:1 by the Spanish garrison and lacked artillery. The king arrived with reinforcements in June. In one particularly dire episode in July, the Spanish attempted to seize a French artillery position, Biron and the young duke of Guise attempted to rebuff them, in the combat that followed the hair was burned off the right side of Biron's head. During the contact of the siege of Amiens, Biron was elevated to the authority of lieutenant of the French army.

The following year peace was established with Spain in the Peace of Vervins, and Biron led the embassy that travelled to Bruxelles to swear to uphold the French end of the peace. As early as 1596, Biron and others in the French court had been approached by Spanish agents, looking for potential malcontents in the French court that might be turned against the crown. These attempts to coax men from his court were revealed to Henry.

=== Savoy campaign ===
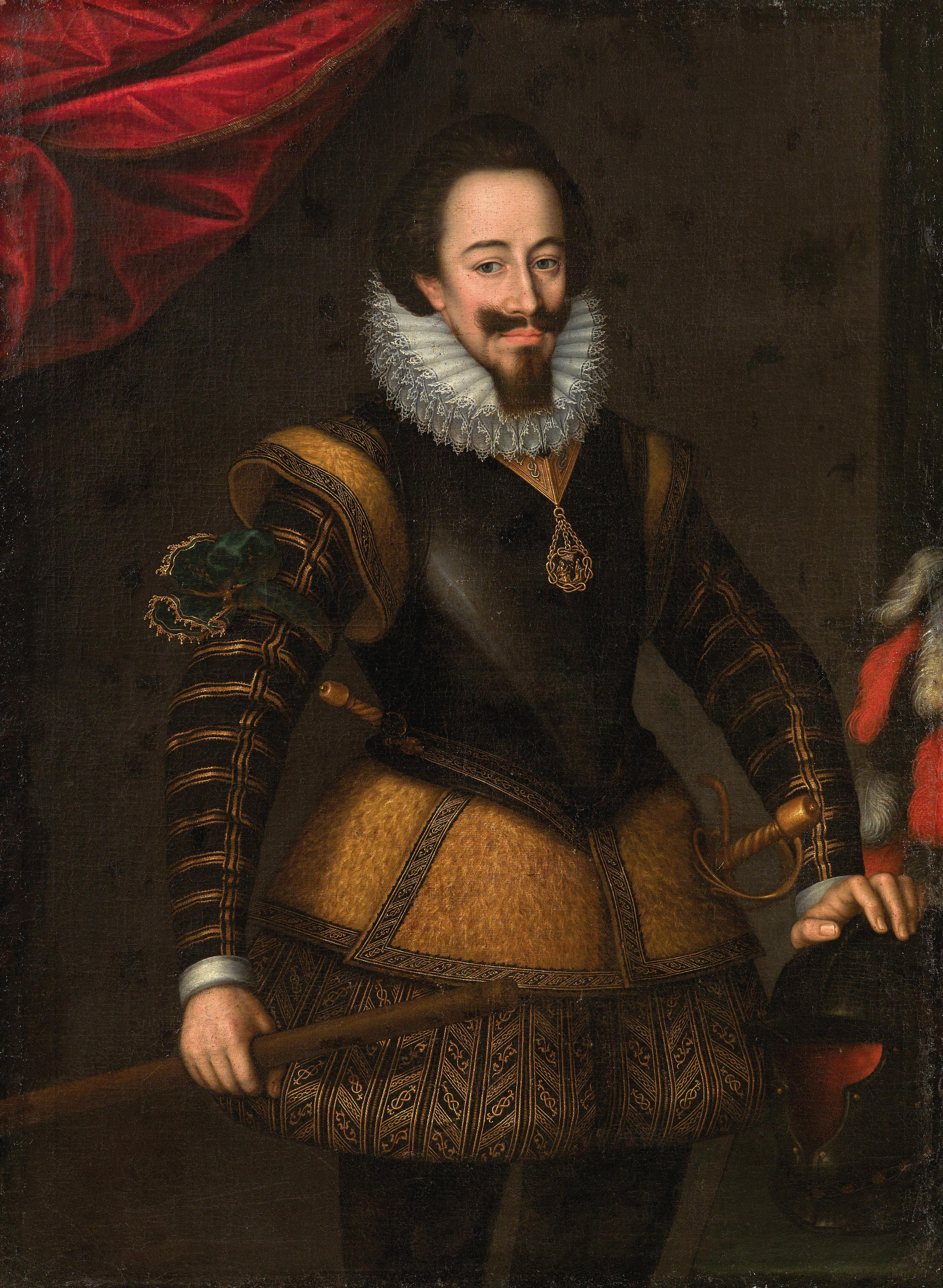
Charles Emmanuel I, Duke of Savoy

After the victory against Spain, Biron led several campaigns against Charles Emmanuel I, Duke of Savoy. By this time Biron was able to boast that he had sustained thirty-two wounds in the service of Henry. In 1598 his barony of Biron was erected into a duché-pairie. Despite the great favour being shown to him, relations between Biron and Henry were increasingly tense.

Biron's military service led to a degree of arrogance, with him boasting that if not for his service, the only crown Henry would wear would be one of thorns. Henry for his part sneered at the social pretensions of the family and mocked Biron's father who had died in service to him. Henry's lack of time for the advice of many of the grandees who had enabled his rise to power led to Biron remarking "courage was of no value" in this new order. Henry for his part admitted the great utility of Biron on the battlefield, but opined that he was not to be entrusted with anything more serious than this.

Biron therefore found himself open to proposals raised with him by the duke of Savoy upon a visit to Paris in 1598 for a marriage with the duke's daughter. Henry ridiculed the prospect, Biron was not of a good enough birth or economic standing for such a match.

Biron continued to campaign against the duke in 1600, although Henry was attempting to reach a peace with the duke in February 1600 in the Treaty of Paris. The duke however refused, securing instead a several month truce in which he hoped Biron would strike at Henry, however no blow against the king came. Henry was annoyed at the continued delays and determined to best the duke before Spain began to look to intervene on the duke's behalf. Biron led a force into the duke's territory in mid-1600, and in August besieged the key town of Bourg-en-Bresse, to the Savoyard duke's disappointment, Biron was not granted command of the entire army. The duke still hoped that Biron would defect and turn his army on Henry. Still excelling at tactics, Biron seized the town by surprise on 13 August, however the citadel held out against him for a while longer. During the campaign, Biron saved the king from an arquebus shot during the siege of Sainte-Catherine.

Soon thereafter, peace was established in the Treaty of Lyon, signed 17 January 1601 which traded the French possession of Saluzzo for Bresse, Bugey, Pays de Gex and Valromey. The government of these new territories was added to Biron's governate as a reward for his military performance in the war, however the formidable fortress of Bourg-en-Bresse was granted to a Protestant, the sieur de Bouaïsse, arousing Biron's fury. Biron saw this as a personal slight, given his considerable role in securing the fortress.

=== Malcontent ===
This personal discontent was combined with a more general disquiet among the great nobles, concerned that Henry's autocratic centralising tendencies were beginning to express themselves. As a result, Biron's negotiations with the duke of Savoy became more serious and conspiratorial, with talks conducted through Jacques de La Fin.

However, Biron got cold feet in his plotting, and during January 1601 he confessed during an interview to the king to having heard these propositions from Savoy. He was verbally pardoned by the king in return. Biron outlined that the king's refusal to grant him Bourg-en-Bresse had led to him holding treasonable thoughts, and that he had desired to secure the hand of the duke of Savoie's third daughter in marriage. Henry was partially reassured by this confession, but still held doubts.

=== La Fin approaches King Henry ===
La Fin later alleged that in the wake of this confession, Biron returned straight to plotting, receiving an offer that exchanged the hand of the duke's daughter, and Bourgogne as his personal fiefdom in return for paying homage to España and declaring war on Henry. La Fin claimed that he was subsequently dispatched by Biron to sign a treaty with the duke to this effect.

In September 1601, Henry and Biron together visited Calais, in the hopes of watching the Spanish Siege of Ostend. Shortly thereafter the king entrusted him with a diplomatic mission to England that year as an indication that he harboured Biron no ill will. He travelled to the country alongside Auvergne, and was warmly received. There was however an air of menace to his visit, with Queen Elizabeth emphasising for him the punishments that befell rebels, even showing him the severed head of the earl of Essex. She told Biron that if she ruled in France there would be many such heads in Paris.

In 1602 he conducted a diplomatic mission to the Swiss confederation. In March of that year, La Fin told the king that Biron had plotted to have him killed during the final campaign against Savoy and had provided secret military information to the Savoyards. According to La Fin, Biron was to lead Henry to an unsafe place, then allow the Savoyard forces to kill him. La Fin alleged that Biron's treasonable dealings had continued after he had been granted a pardon in January 1601. La Fin's defection from Biron in March was motivated by his eclipse in the duke's favour by the baron de Lux. As a reward for his defection, his debts were relieved by the king.

Henry ordered La Fin not to include other lords that he wished to implicate in his depositions, focusing the treason trial on the person of Biron. La Fin had alleged that Auvergne, Bouillon, Constable Montmorency and Épernon were aware of his dealings. Henry then travelled to Périgord to crush some tax rebellions, during which he began to wonder if these too were the work of Biron. Some historians have leant credence to this notion. At this time Henry quizzed Bouillon who was with him on campaign on the subject of treason, but Bouillon proved evasive, and departed from the campaign shortly thereafter.

=== Confrontation ===
In May Henry established himself at Poitiers, ultimately deciding to abolish the tax that had caused the protest, fearing that it might be a channel of support to Biron in any future showdown. Henry was keen to lull Biron into a sense of security, and wrote to him to warn him of Spanish movements across the border from his governate. Meanwhile he dispatched Pierre Jeannin to discuss with Biron various false accusations against him, and upon his return, he wrote to Biron that the matter was closed and to come to court. To further entice Biron he wrote to the baron de Lux, an intimate of Biron, that he harboured no suspicions concerning Biron. With some reservations, Biron arrived at court in Fontainbleau on 12 June.

Henry put on a welcome face publicly after Biron arrived, playing Jeu de Paume with the Marshal, showing him his new statue and plans for Fontainbleau. Upon showing Biron the statue, Henry asked Biron, "what would the king of Spain say if he could see me like this?" Biron responded that the king of Spain would not be afraid of him which Henry found insulting. After playing jeu de paume with Henry, Épernon and Soissons, Biron was left with Soissons in the evening, who attempted to coax him into an admission, but Biron was adamant. Behind closed doors Henry took a different tack with Biron, accusing him of treason, and promising that he would be pardoned if he confessed. Historians are not in agreement as to whether this was a genuine offer. Having been summoned to meet with the king early the next morning in the garden of Tibre, Biron was kept waiting by the king who after his arrival again pressed Biron to confess. Getting nowhere the two parted ways. Henry summoned him again that night at midnight to ask him whether he has reconsidered his position. Biron again denied the accusations. Henry dismissed him: "Farewell baron de Biron, you know what I told you". Biron had been elevated from baron to duke several years previously. Soon thereafter he was arrested by the marquis de Vitry, captain of Henry's guard. Auvergne was also arrested at this time.

=== Treason ===
The two men were taken under heavy guard to Paris. Their interrogations were led by the chancellor of France, Bellièvre. Henry for his part was conscious that Biron's trial would be a sensitive matter for the high nobility, and assembled many grandees, so he could read the documentary evidence La Fin had prepared to them. This proved a failure however, the high nobility largely disgusted by Biron's treatment, refusing to take up their roles in the Parlement to oversee the case. Biron continued to deny the accusations levelled at him and defended himself in front of the Parlement of Paris after his trial began on 17 June. He demonstrated that many of La Fin's accusations were impossible. La Fin was unable to produce the treaty Biron had allegedly signed with the duke of Savoy. He stressed the service he and his father had rendered to the king and his Catholicism. Henry scoffed at the latter, rumours of Biron's atheistic religious leanings having swirled for years.

He was condemned on the charge of treason by the Paris Parlement on 27 July, with a sentence of death. Biron was shocked that this was not commuted by Henry. He noted that the king had taken to his side men like Mayenne who had spent years fighting against him, and yet would not have mercy on a man who had served him for years. Biron's friends and family pled for his life, arguing that his death would be a great dishonour for them. Henry retorted that the dishonour was only that of the "criminal".

=== Execution ===
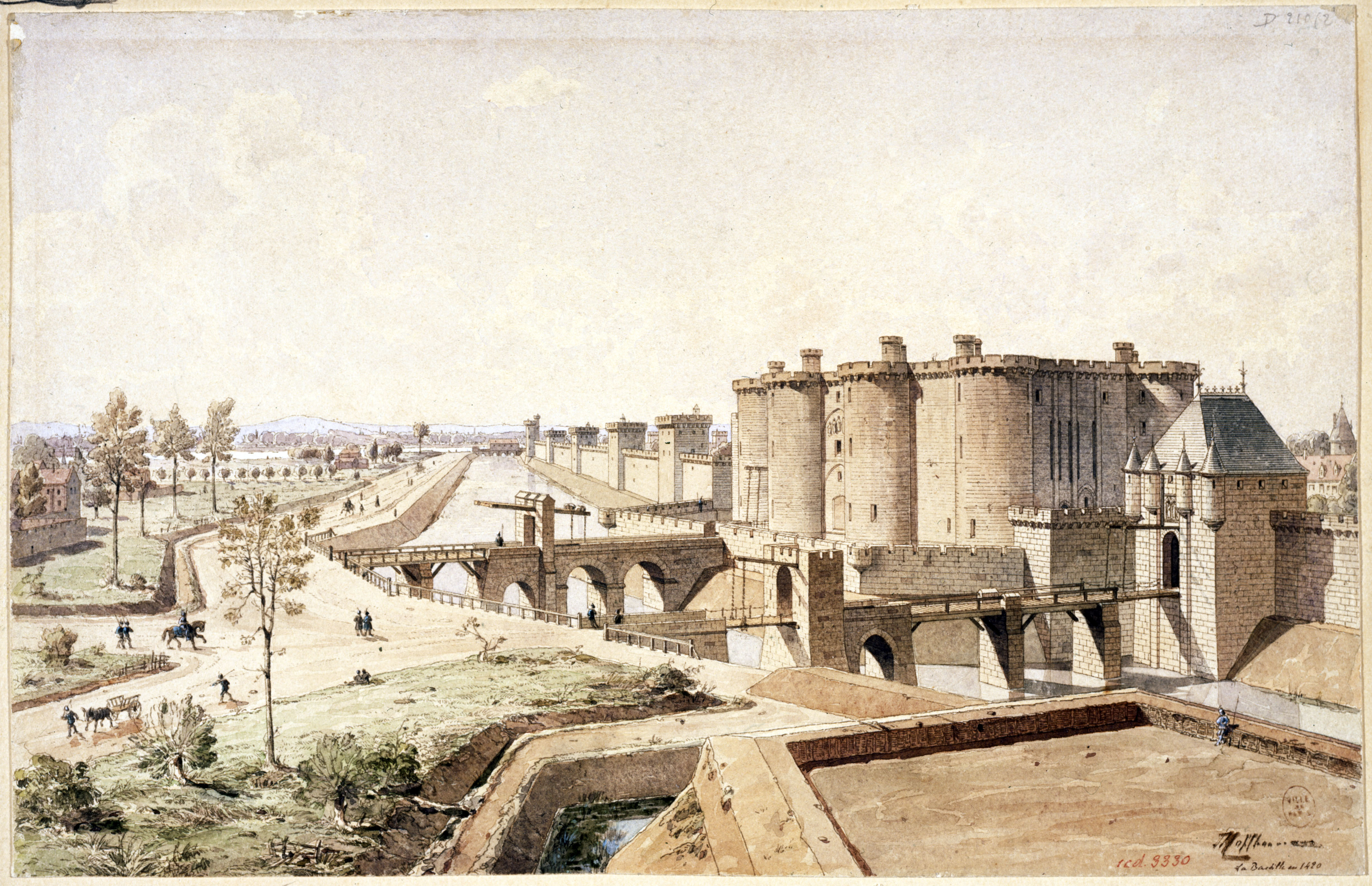
Historical reconstruction of the Bastille, c. 1420

On 31 July 1602 Biron was executed at the Bastille. The only privilege Henry granted him was that the execution took place in the courtyard of the Bastille as opposed to a public execution at the Place de Grève. Henry wrote to Lesdiguières on the day of the execution, insisting that Biron was a prideful and atheistic man. He argued that Biron was ignorant of the Catholic creed and religion. In defiance of Henry, many senior aristocrats would visit his final resting place at the church of Saint-Paul in the coming years.

According to Pierre de L'Estoile, a Parisian diarist in years previous, Biron had been warned that he would be killed by a strike from behind delivered by a man from Dijon. Biron dismissed the warning, however his executioner was allegedly from the city.

Henry wrote that with the execution of Biron he wished to set an example to the nobility, however there would be many more plots against Henry in the coming years. His treatment contrasts with that handed out to other noble conspirators against the crown. Bouillon who had been responsible for disorders in the centre of the kingdom, was treated relatively leniently in comparison. It has therefore been concluded by some historians that an element of personal score settling was involved in his trial.

== Legacy ==
Biron's seigneuries were restored to the Gontaut family after his death, however that of Biron would no longer be a duché-pairie. Henry wrote to Biron's brother-in-law, Jacques Nompar de Caumont, later Duke of La Force, to assure him the king maintained his affections for the other members of the family. However, de Caumont was disgusted at the execution of Biron.

Biron had an extensive clientèle network in the Quercy and Périgord, and it was partly to undermine clientèle systems such as this that Henry IV's chief minister the duke of Sully, established a system of hereditary royal offices through the Paulette. This effort would be largely in vain, and for a long time there were bitter feelings in Périgord concerning Biron's execution. Meanwhile in Burgundy, the various commanders under Biron's authority acquiesced to his execution with relatively little trouble.

In 1604, Auvergne was again suspected of involvement in conspiracy against the crown. Henry tried to lure him to court. Auvergne refused, well aware of what had befallen Biron after such an invitation. He was nonetheless arrested in November of that year, and lodged in Biron's former cell at the Bastille. However, there would be no death penalty for him. In 1606, Biron's brother killed La Fin. He was not prosecuted for the act.

== In literature and pop culture ==
Biron was the inspiration behind the character Berowne in William Shakespeare's Love's Labour's Lost, which was written during his lifetime.

A story of Biron's last days is told in a 1978 song by the French-Canadian rock band Garolou, entitled "La complainte du maréchal Biron". In the song, Biron is depicted as having an affair with the queen of France upon returning to Paris, which is the motivation behind the king's decision to have Biron executed.

Biron is referenced in Gérard de Nerval's famous sonnet, "El Desdichado."

== Sources ==
- Babelon, Jean-Pierre (2009). Henri IV. Fayard.
- Harding, Robert (1978). Anatomy of a Power Elite: the Provincial Governors in Early Modern France. Yale University Press.
- Holt, Mack P. (2020). The Politics of Wine in Early Modern France: Religion and Popular Culture in Burgundy, 1477-1630. Cambridge University Press.
- Jouanna, Arlette (1998). Histoire et Dictionnaire des Guerres de Religion. Bouquins.
- Knecht, Robert (2010). The French Wars of Religion, 1559-1598. Routledge.
- Pitts, Vincent (2012). Henri IV of France: His Reign and Age. Johns Hopkins University Press.
- Roelker, Nancy (1996). One King, One Faith: The Parlement of Paris and the Religious Reformation of the Sixteenth Century. University of California Press.
- Le Roux, Nicolas (2000). La Faveur du Roi: Mignons et Courtisans au Temps des Derniers Valois. Champ Vallon.
- Salmon, J.H.M (1979). Society in Crisis: France during the Sixteenth Century. Metheun & Co.
