= André de Brancas =

French admiral

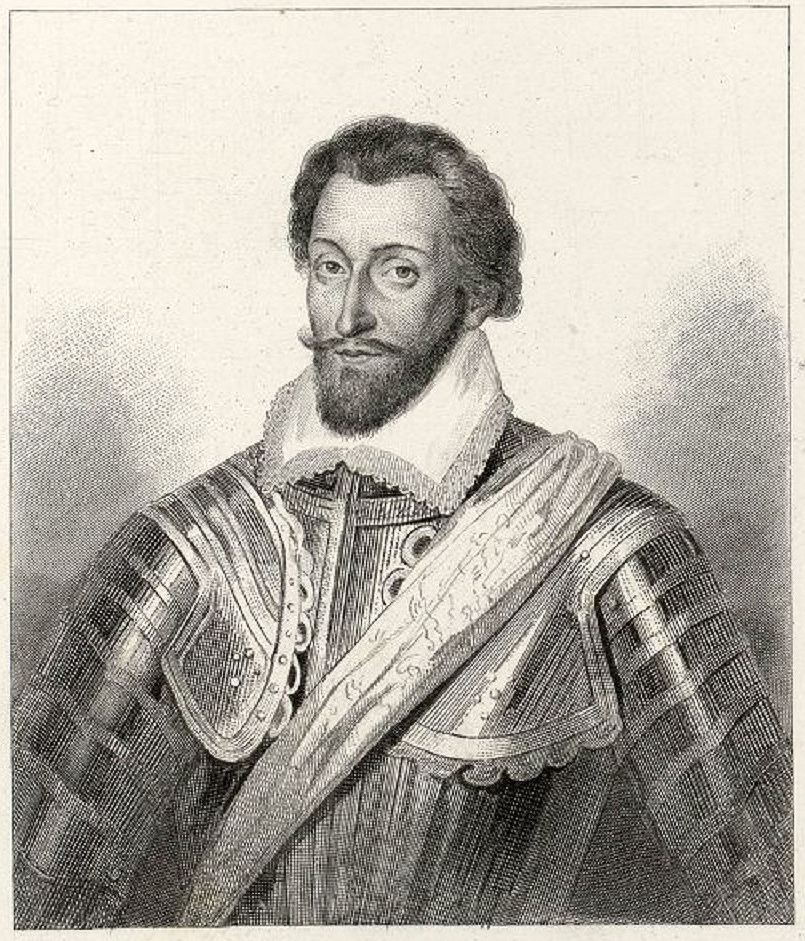
André de Brancas, seigneur de Villars

André de Brancas or Amiral de Villars (died 24 July 1595) was a French admiral.

He fought for the Catholic League and the Spanish, wishing to make Normandy an independent lordship. He remained in Rouen even after the abjuration of Henry IV of France, and did not submit until 1594. He was made an Admiral of France on 23 August 1594. In 1595 he was captured and killed by the Spanish at the Siege of Doullens.
