= Pedro Henriquez de Acevedo, Count of Fuentes =

Spanish general and statesman

General Pedro Henriquez de Acevedo 1st Count of Fuentes Lord of Camabos jure uxoris
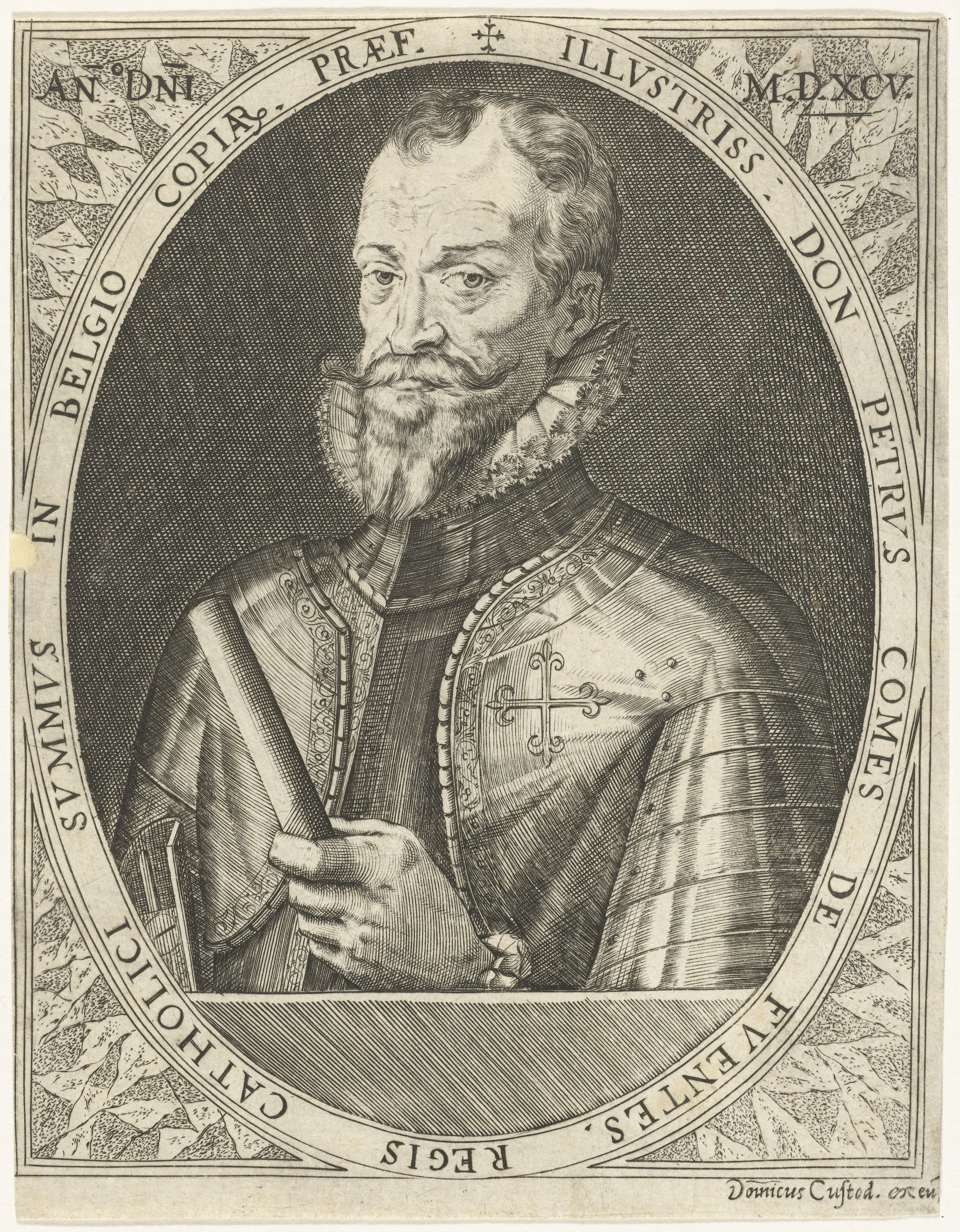
- Count Fuentes
- Born: Pedro Henriquez d'Azevedo y Alvarez de Toledo; 21 September 1525; Zamora, Crown of Castile, Spanish Empire
- Died: 22 July 1610 (aged 84); Milan, Duchy of Milan, Spanish Empire
- Spouse: Juana de Acevedo y Fonseca
- Relatives: Diego Enríquez de Guzmán (father); Catalina de Toledo y Pimentel (mother); Alonso Enríquez de Guzmán y Toledo; Juan Enríquez de Guzmán y Toledo (brother); Fernando Enríquez de Guzmán y Toledo (brother); Teresa Enríquez de Guzmán y Toledo (sister); Jerónima Enríquez de Guzmán y de Toledo (sister); Antonia Enríquez de Guzmán y Toledo (sister)
- Military career
- Allegiance: Spanish Empire
- Branch: (Spanish Empire) Spanish Army (Spanish Empire) Army of Flanders
- Service years: 1557–1610
- Rank: General
- Conflicts: Italian War of 1551–1559 Anglo–Spanish War (1585–1604): English Armada; Defense of Lisbon; Franco-Spanish War (1595–98): Siege of Le Catelet and Clary; Siege of Doullens; Siege of Cambrai

Governor-General of the Spanish Netherlands
- In office 20 February 1595 – 1596
- Monarch: Philip II
- Preceded by: Archduke Ernest of Austria
- Succeeded by: Albert of Austria

Governor of the Duchy of Milan
- In office 20 April 1600 – 22 July 1610
- Monarch: Philip III
- Valido: Duke of Lerma
- Preceded by: Juan Fernández de Velasco y Tovar
- Succeeded by: Diego de Portugal

Pedro Henriquez d'Azevedo y Alvarez de Toledo, Count of Fuentes de Valdepero (1525 – 22 July 1610) was a Spanish general and statesman.

== Biography ==
Born at Zamora, he was a page at the court of Philip II of Spain, training in Naples in 1557, aged 32 with Fernando Alvarez de Toledo, 3rd Duke of Alba, (1507–1582), Governor of the Duchy of Milan, 1555–1556, Viceroy of Naples, 1556–1557, Governor of the Habsburg Netherlands, Viceroy of Portugal, 1582–1584,

He took part in the 1580 campaign in Portugal under the Duke of Alba and in 1582 was given supreme command over the Spanish troops. In 1589, as Captain General of Portugal, he successfully defended Lisbon against the attack by the English Armada, led by John Norreys and Francis Drake.

Sent in 1591 by the king to the Netherlands, he assisted after the death of Alexander Farnese, Duke of Parma, his successor Peter Ernst I von Mansfeld-Vorderort and later Ernst of Austria, after whose death he became interim stateholder of the Netherlands. He conquered Doullens and Cambrai during the Franco-Spanish War (1595–1598). His excessive severity persuaded Philip II to exchange him for Albert of Austria.

He was then made governor and Captain General of Milan, 1600–1610, dying in office aged 85, where he spread fear among the Italian nobility, especially the Venetians through his policies and use of the army. In 1599, he entered into a treaty with the Count of Savoy and assisted in the conspiracy of Biron. Under his rule a famous fortress, the Forte di Fuentes, where the river Adda meets Lake Como, still named after him and now ruined, was built to guard the border against the Grisons near Colico, LC.

He died in office at Milan. He was married, 1585, aged 60, to Juana de Acevedo y Fonseca, who had been awarded the title by king Philip II of Spain in 1572, being thus suo jure 1st Countess of Fuentes de Valdepero, and during that marriage, he was therefore jure uxoris Count of Fuentes de Valdepero. As he and his wife died childless, the title passed to one of her relatives, Manuel de Acevedo y Zúñiga, 6th Count of Monterrey, Ourense, Spain, Grandee of Spain by king Philip IV of Spain on 11 July 1628, Viceroy of Naples, 1631–1637.

== Sources ==
- Parker, Geoffrey (1979). Europe in Crisis, 1598-1648. Fontana Press. ISBN 978-0006356707.
- Gran Enciclopedia de España, 1992, 22 vols, 11,052 pages, vol 8, page 3,574.

Government offices
Preceded by Juan Fernández de Velasco	Governor of the Duchy of Milan; 1600–1610	Succeeded by Juan Fernández de Velasco
Preceded by Ernest of Austria	Governor of the Habsburg Netherlands; 1595–1596	Succeeded by Albert of Austria
Spanish nobility
Preceded by Juana de Acevedo y Fonseca	Count of Fuentes with Juana de Acevedo y Fonseca	Succeeded by Manuel de Acevedo y Zúñiga
