= François d'Orléans-Longueville, duc de Fronsac =

French noble

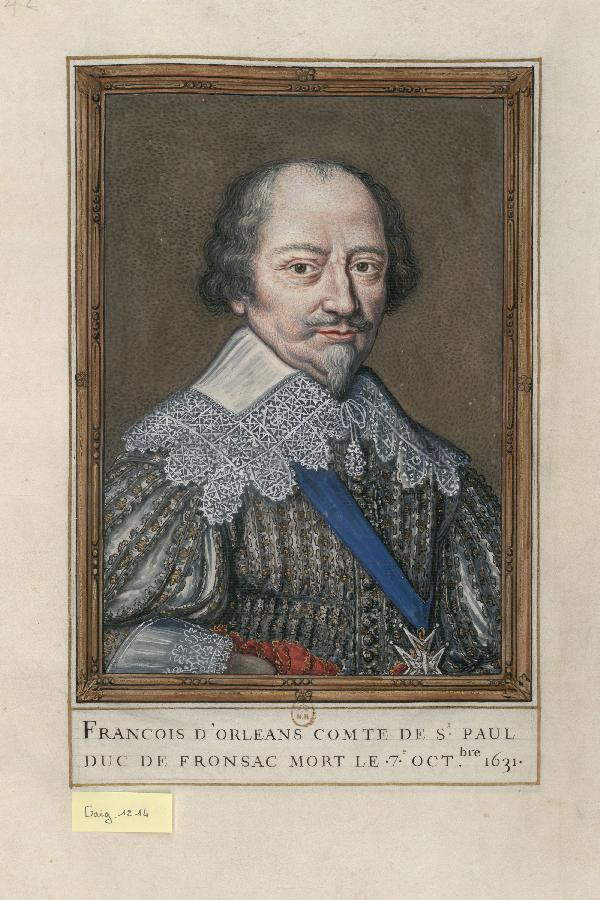
François d'Orléans-Longueville (1570–1631)

François III d’Orléans (1570 – 1631), Duke of Château-Thierry and of Fronsac, Count of Saint-Pol was governor of Orléans, Blois and Tours and a general of the French Wars of Religion. He was the second born son of Leonor of Neuchâtel.

François III was created Count of Saint-Pol in 1601. In January 1608, he inherited the title of Duke of Fronsac when his only son, Léonor II, 1st Duke of Fronsac died without an heir.
