= R. B. Wernham =

English historian

R. B. Wernham FBA
- Born: Richard Bruce Wernham; 11 October 1906; Ashmansworth, Berkshire
- Died: 17 April 1999 (aged 92)
- Spouse: Isobel MacMillan (m. 1939)

Academic background
- Education: Exeter College, Oxford

Academic work
- Discipline: History
- Institutions: Worcester College, Oxford (1951–72)
- Main interests: Elizabethan foreign policy

Richard Bruce Wernham, FBA (11 October 1906 – 17 April 1999) was an English historian of Elizabethan England. After his death The Times called him "the leading historian of English foreign policy in the 16th century".

== Early life ==
Wernham, the son of a tenant farmer, was born in Ashmansworth in Hampshire. He was educated at St Bartholomew's Grammar School before going to Exeter College, Oxford, in 1925, where he achieved a first in modern history in 1927.

== Academic career ==
In 1930 he was appointed a temporary assistant at the Public Record Office as part of a scheme designed to help young scholars achieve archival knowledge and editorial experience in preparation for a career in academia. He was appointed editor of the State Papers foreign series and edited its successor, the Lists and Analyses of State Papers. In October 1933 Wernham was appointed lecturer in history at University College London. In April 1934 he was elected lecturer and then Fellow of Trinity College, which he would hold until 1951.

In 1939 he married Isobel MacMillan, with whom he had a daughter Joan in 1943. During the Second World War he served in the Royal Air Force at the photographic interpretation unit at Medmenham in Buckinghamshire, where his main duty was identifying appropriate landing sites for Special Operations Executive agents.

Wernham was Professor of Modern History and Fellow at Worcester College, Oxford, from 1951 until 1972. He was also a visiting professor at South Carolina University (1958) and California University (1965–6).

In 1956 Wernham criticised Geoffrey Elton's Tudor Revolution in Government for failing to demonstrate that there was any significant reform of the workings of the king's council under Thomas Cromwell, and he pointed out that many of Cromwell's administrative changes were reversed after his fall from power. Wernham also argued that Henry VIII was the dominating influence on policy, not Cromwell.

Wernham also criticised Charles Wilson's 1969 Ford Lectures. Wilson had attacked Elizabeth I for refusing to intervene in the Netherlands during the late 1570s. Wernham responded by claiming that intervention at that time would have provoked Philip II into a trade war, if not actual war.

Wernham delivered the Una Lectures at Berkeley, California in 1975 and these were published as The Making of Elizabethan Foreign Policy (1980).

In his 1984 work, After the Armada, Wernham argued that the strain of an expensive Continental war was a factor that helped pave the way for the English Civil War. In 1997 he was elected Fellow of the British Academy.

Hugh Trevor-Roper considered Wernham "an archivist and not an historian".

== Works ==
- "The Disgrace of William Davison", The English Historical Review, Vol. 46, No. 184 (Oct., 1931), pp. 632–636.
- "Queen Elizabeth and the Siege of Rouen, 1591", Transactions of the Royal Historical Society, Vol. 15 (1932), pp. 163–179.
- (editor), Calendar of State Papers, Foreign Series, of the Reign of Elizabeth. Vol. XXII: July–December 1588 (London: Stationery Office, 1936).
- "Queen Elizabeth and the Portugal Expedition of 1589", The English Historical Review, Vol. 66, No. 258 (Jan., 1951), pp. 1–26.
- "Queen Elizabeth and the Portugal Expedition of 1589 (Continued)", The English Historical Review, Vol. 66, No. 259 (Apr., 1951), pp. 194–218.
- Before the Armada: The Emergence of the English Nation, 1485-1588 (London: Jonathan Cape, 1966).
- (editor), The New Cambridge Modern History. III. The Counter-Reformation and the Price Revolution (London: Cambridge University Press, 1968).
- "Christopher Marlowe at Flushing in 1592", The English Historical Review, Vol. 91, No. 359 (Apr., 1976), pp. 344–345.
- The Making of Elizabethan Foreign Policy, 1558-1603 (University of California Press, 1980).
- After the Armada: Elizabethan England and the Struggle for Western Europe, 1588-1595 (Oxford: Clarendon Press, 1984).
- The Expedition of Sir John Norris and Sir Francis Drake to Spain and Portugal, 1589 (Aldershot: Temple Smith, 1989).
- The Return of the Armadas. The Last Years of the Elizabethan War against Spain, 1595-1603 (Oxford: Clarendon Press, 1994).
