= 1593 in France =

- Decades: 1570s; 1580s; 1590s; 1600s; 1610s
- See also: History of France; Timeline of French history; List of years in France

Events from the year 1593 in France.

== Incumbents ==
- Monarch – Henry IV

== Events ==
=== January–June ===
- January 26 – The Conseil of the Catholic League convenes the Estates General in Paris to receive the decisions of the Council of Trent and to consider the election of a Catholic sovereign, even if it means calling into question the Salic law. Isabella Clara Eugenia, Sovereign of the Habsburg Netherlands, Charles Emmanuel I, Duke of Savoy, Charles III, Duke of Lorraine, and two Catholic Bourbons are candidates. However, Henry IV of France takes the court of deputies by surprise in announcing his intention to return to the Catholic faith on May 17.
- February 6 – Death of Jacques Amyot, following which historian and politician Jacques Auguste de Thou succeed him as director of the Bibliothèque Nationale, an office he and his son will hold until 1642.
- March 17 – Henri IV, visiting Saumur to see his sister Catherine de Bourbon, grants the inhabitants local tax privileges.
- April 18 – Anglo-Spanish War: The Naval Battle of Blaye in the Gironde estuary sees a Spanish victory over the blockading English fleet, allowing the Spanish to relieve the French Catholic garrison of Blaye.
- April 29 – Opening of conferences at Suresnes between the king and the deputies of the League.
- May 2 – Wars of Religion: Battle of Port-Ringeard – Royal army is victorious over the League.
- June 7 – Battle of Salbertrand in Piedmont: Victory of François de Bonne, Duke of Lesdiguières, over the Spanish of Rodrigue Alvarez of Toledo, allies of Charles Emmanuel I, Duke of Savoy.
- June 28 – Lemaistre, president of the Parlement of Paris, decides that the Salic law and the Catholic rule of the kings of France under the fundamental laws of the kingdom are to be judged equally.

=== July–December ===
- July 8 – The king takes Dreux, entrepôt for the Paris food supply.
- July 25 – The king abjures Protestantism at the Basilica of Saint-Denis. Legend attributes to him the saying Paris vaut bien une messe ("Paris is well worth a mass").
- July 31 – Three-month truce was signed at la Villette between the king and the League. One by one, towns rally to the king.
- August 27 – Pierre Barrière attempts to assassinate the king at Melun; he is denounced by Séraphin Banchi, the Dominican priest to whom he confesses, arrested and on August 31 executed on the breaking wheel and suffers dismemberment.
- November 8 – Assembly of Protestants of the kingdom at Mantes (ends 23 January 1594).
- December 8
  - Henri I de Montmorency, one of the 'Malcontents', becomes Grand Constable of France.
  - Royal letters patent for the creation of the Jardin des plantes de Montpellier conferred on Pierre Richer de Belleval.
- December 12 – The marquis of Vitry, gouvernor of Meaux, rallies to the king.
- December
  - Exactions of Anne de Sanzay, Count of la Magnane, captain of Philippe Emmanuel, Duke of Mercœur, in Cornouaille.
  - Origin of wine producer Château d'Yquem

=== Undated ===
- The Academy of Saumur is founded as a Huguenot university at Saumur by Philippe de Mornay.
- The Collège de Bourbon in Rouen, the predecessor of the Lycée Pierre-Corneille, is founded as a Jesuit secondary school by Cardinal-Archbishop Charles de Bourbon.

== Births ==
- February 8 – Louis de Nogaret de La Valette, cardinal and lieutenant-general (died 1639)
- March 13 – Georges de La Tour, painter (died 1652)
- March 20 – Jean de La Haye, Franciscan preacher and biblical scholar (died 1661)
- March 25 – Jean de Brébeuf, Jesuit missionary to New France (martyred 1649 in New France)
- April 27 – Jérôme Lalemant, Jesuit missionary to Canada (died 1673)
- May 19 – Claude Vignon, painter (died 1670)
- November 1 – Abel Servien, nobleman and diplomat (died 1659)
- November 25 – Alain de Solminihac, bishop of Cahors, beatified (died 1659)
- Undated
  - Louis Barbier, Abbé de la Rivière, bishop of Langres, courtier and gambler (died 1670)
  - Claude de Razilly, naval officer (died 1654))
  - Charles de Saint-Étienne de la Tour, colonist and fur trader, governor of Acadia (died 1666 in Acadia)
- Approximate date – Jeanette Abadie, supposed witch
- Probable date – Louis Le Nain, painter (died 1648)

== Deaths ==
- January 12 – Amadis Jamyn, poet (born 1538)
- February 6 – Jacques Amyot, bishop of Auxerre, writer and translator (born 1513)
- Approximate date – Esther Imbert, a maîtresse-en-titre to the king (born 1570)
- Latest date – Jean Cousin the Elder, painter, sculptor, etcher, engraver and geometrician (born 1500)
