= 1585 in France =

- Decades: 1560s; 1570s; 1580s; 1590s; 1600s
- See also: History of France; Timeline of French history; List of years in France

Events from the year 1585 in France.

== Incumbents ==
- Monarch – Henry III from the house of Valois-Angoulême.

== Events ==
- July 7 – The Treaty of Nemours is signed, forcing Henry III of France to capitulate to the demands of the Catholic League (founded 1576) and triggering the Eighth War of Religion.
- September 21 – Pope Sixtus V excommunicates King Henry IV, the heir presumptive to Henry III, and declares him ineligible to inherit the crown.
- By marrying Charles Emmanuel I, Duke of Savoy on March 11, Catalina Micaela of Spain becomes the Duchess consort of Savoy from March 18 until her death in 1597.

== Arts ==
=== Literature ===
- Livre de mélanges by Claude Le Jeune.
- Pierre Bonnet is active from 1585 to 1600.
- Nicolas de Montreux publishes three pastorals named Athlette and the first volume of Les Bergeries de Juliette. The following four volumes were published in the years leading up to 1598.
- Les Quatre premiers livres des navigations et pérégrinations en la Turquie (1568 by Nicolas de Nicolaÿ) is translated into English by Thomas Washington (translation published as The Nauigations into Turkie).

=== Architecture ===
- The Neubau of Strasbourg is finished. The building is not modified until around three hundred years later, when Eugène Petiti (1809–1883) added an aisle on the south side of the building in 1867.
- The Pont-de-Crau, an unused aqueduct, was built in the eponymous city.
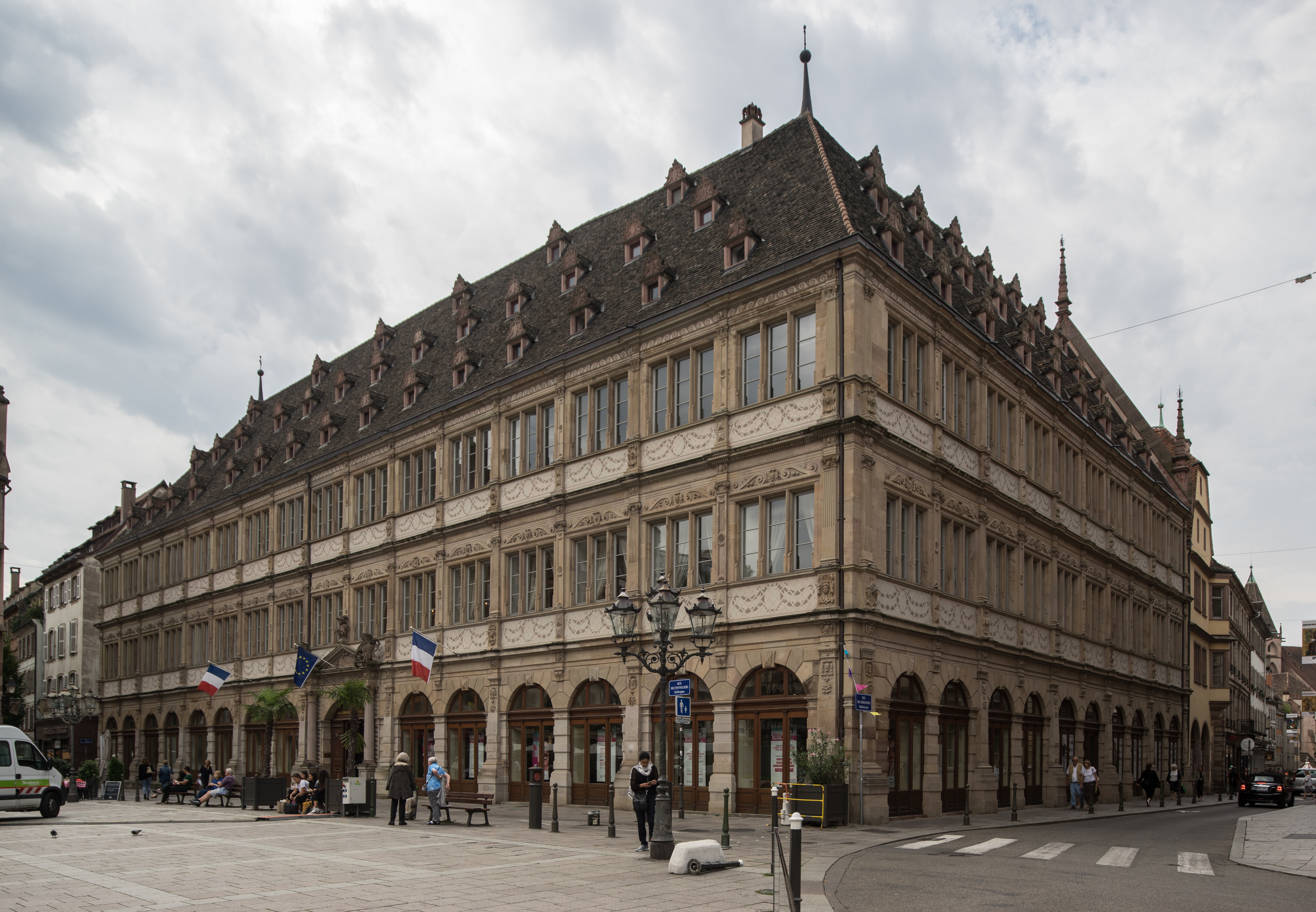
The Neubau in 2018

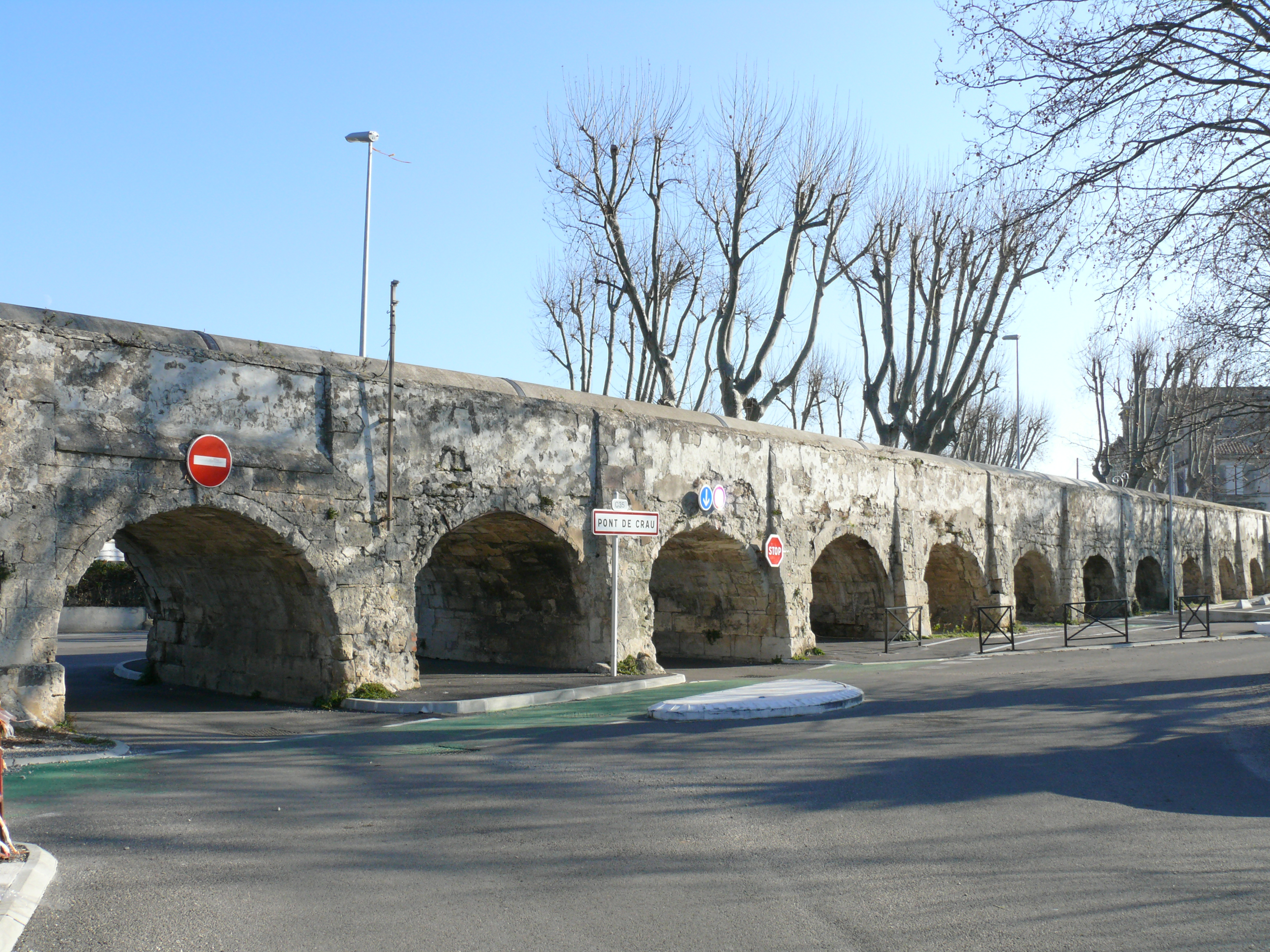
The aqueduct

=== Painting ===
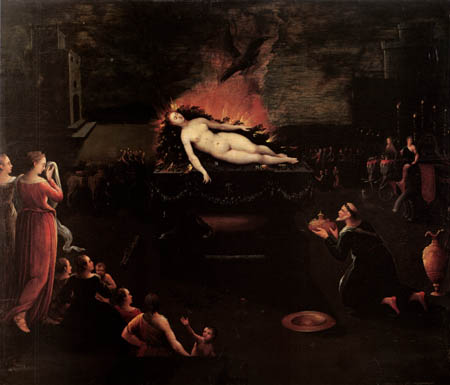
Apotheose of Semele by Antoine Caron. (Private collection/Paris)

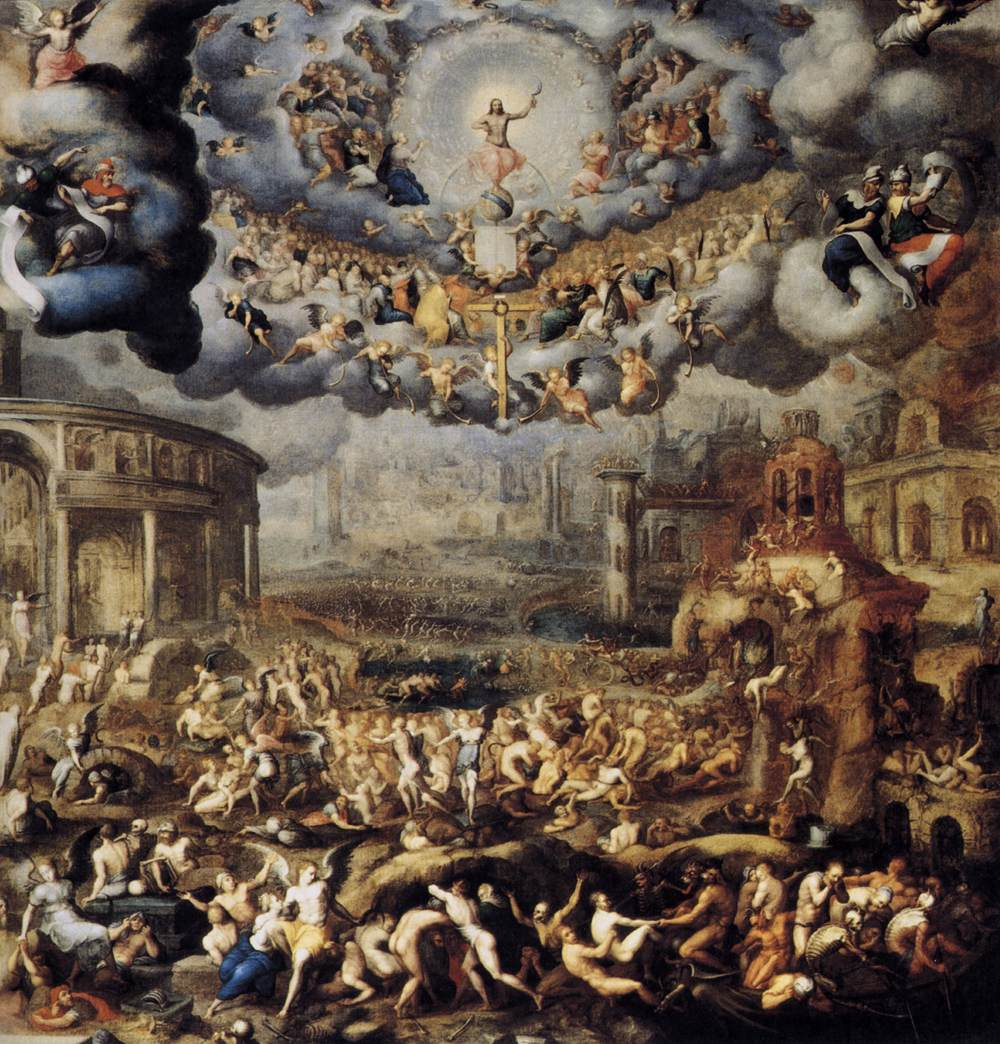
The Last Judgement (Le Jugement dernier) by Jehan Cousin the Younger (Louvre/Paris)

== Births ==
- January 6 – Claude Favre de Vaugelas, Grammarian and academician (d. 1650).
- January 8 – Henriette Catherine de Joyeuse, daughter of Henri de Joyeuse and Duchess of Joyeuse 1608–1656 (d. 1656).
- May 6 – Guy XX de Laval, Count of Laval (Mayenne) and Baron of Quintin (d. 1605).
- July 2 – Jean Guiton, Huguenot ship owner (d. 1654).
- September 9 – Armand Jean du Plessis, Cardinal Richelieu, politician and 4th Prime Minister of France (d. 1642).
- October 15 – Louis Cappel, Protestant churchman and scholar (d. 1658).

=== Full date unknown ===
- Constant d'Aubigné, nobleman (d. 1647).
- Mathias Balifre, singer of the Chapelle royale under Louis XIII (d. 1641).
- Jacques Bordier, lawyer at the Parliament of Paris and Intendant des finances from 1649 to 1660 (d. 1660).
- Catherine of Mayenne, aristocrat (d. 1618).
- Isaac Briot, engraver and draughtsman (d. 1670).
- Nicolas Signac, composer (d. 1645).
- Pierre Belain d'Esnambuc, merchant and adventurer in the Caribbean (d. 1636).
- Jean Caylar d'Anduze de Saint-Bonnet, Marshal of France (d. 1636).
- Pierre Dumonstier II, artist (d. 1656).
- Adrienne d'Heur, alleged French witch who was burned in 1646.
- Jacques Cousinot, Louis XIV's first royal physician (d. 1646).
- Nicolas-Hugues Ménard (Latinized: Hugo Menardus), Benedictine scholar (d. 1644).
- Francis Garasse, Jesuit, preacher, polemicist and writer (d. 1631).

=== Probable ===
- Jean Androuet du Cerceau, architect (d. 1650).
- Claudine de Culam, girl executed in 1601 for committing bestiality with a dog.
- Jacques Lemercier, architect (d. 1654).

== Deaths ==
- March 11 – Jean-François Salvard, Reformed theologian and editor (b. c. 1530).
- June 4 – Marc Antoine Muret (Latinized: Muretus), humanist (b. 1526).
- June 15 – Jacques de Savoie, Duke of Nemours, nobleman and military commander, governor of Lyonnais and Prince Étranger (b. 1531).
- July – Georges d'Armagnac, humanist and cardinal (b. c. 1501).
- September 19 – François de Noailles, Bishop of Dax, French ambassador in Venice and the Ottoman Empire (b. 1519).
- November 5 – Pontus De la Gardie, nobleman (b. c. 1520).
- November 29 – Matthieu Cointerel, cardinal (b. 1519).
- December 27 – Pierre de Ronsard, poet (b. 1524).

=== Full date uncertain ===
- Jacques I Androuet du Cerceau, engraver and architect (b. 1510).
- Louise de Cipierre, court official and Première dame d'honneur from 1583 until her death in 1585 (b. unknown).
