= 1578 in France =

- Decades: 1550s; 1560s; 1570s; 1580s; 1590s
- See also: History of France; Timeline of French history; List of years in France

Events from the year 1578 in France

== Incumbents ==
- Monarch – Henry III

== Events ==
- April 27 – The Duel of the Mignons claims the lives of two favorites of Henry III of France, and two favourites of Henry I, Duke of Guise

== Births ==
- December 20 – Henry of Lorraine, Duke of Mayenne, French noble (d. 1621)

== Deaths ==
- March 7 - Gilles de Gouberville, French diarist (b. 1521)
- March 29 – Louis I, Cardinal of Guise, French cardinal (b. 1527)
- April 2 – Marie Elisabeth of France, French princess (b. 1572)
- April 7 - Gilles Spifame de Brou, French prelate
- April 27 - Georges de Schomberg, French courtier (b. c. 1560)
- April 27 - Louis de Maugiron, French courtier (b. c. 1560)
- April 29 - François d'Aydie, French noble (b. c. 1550)
- April 30 - Jeanne Harvilliers, French alleged witch (b. 1528)
- July 22 - Paul de Stuer, French noble and military commander (b. c. 1554)
- May 29 - Jacques de Lévis, French noble (b. c. 1554)
- September 10 – Pierre Lescot, French architect (b. 1510)
- October 13 - Jean Bullant, French architect and sculptor (b. 1513)
- Antonio Mizauld, French astronomer and physician (b. 1510)
- Jean Raymond Merlin, French Protestant theologian (b. c. 1510)
- Bertrand-Rambaud de Simiane, French military commander (b. c. 1513)
