= 1594 in France =

- Decades: 1570s; 1580s; 1590s; 1600s; 1610s
- See also: History of France; Timeline of French history; List of years in France

Events from the year 1594 in France.

== Incumbents ==
- Monarch – Henry IV

== Events ==
- 6 to 17 September – Siege of Morlaix
- 1 to 19 November – Siege of Fort Crozon

== Births ==
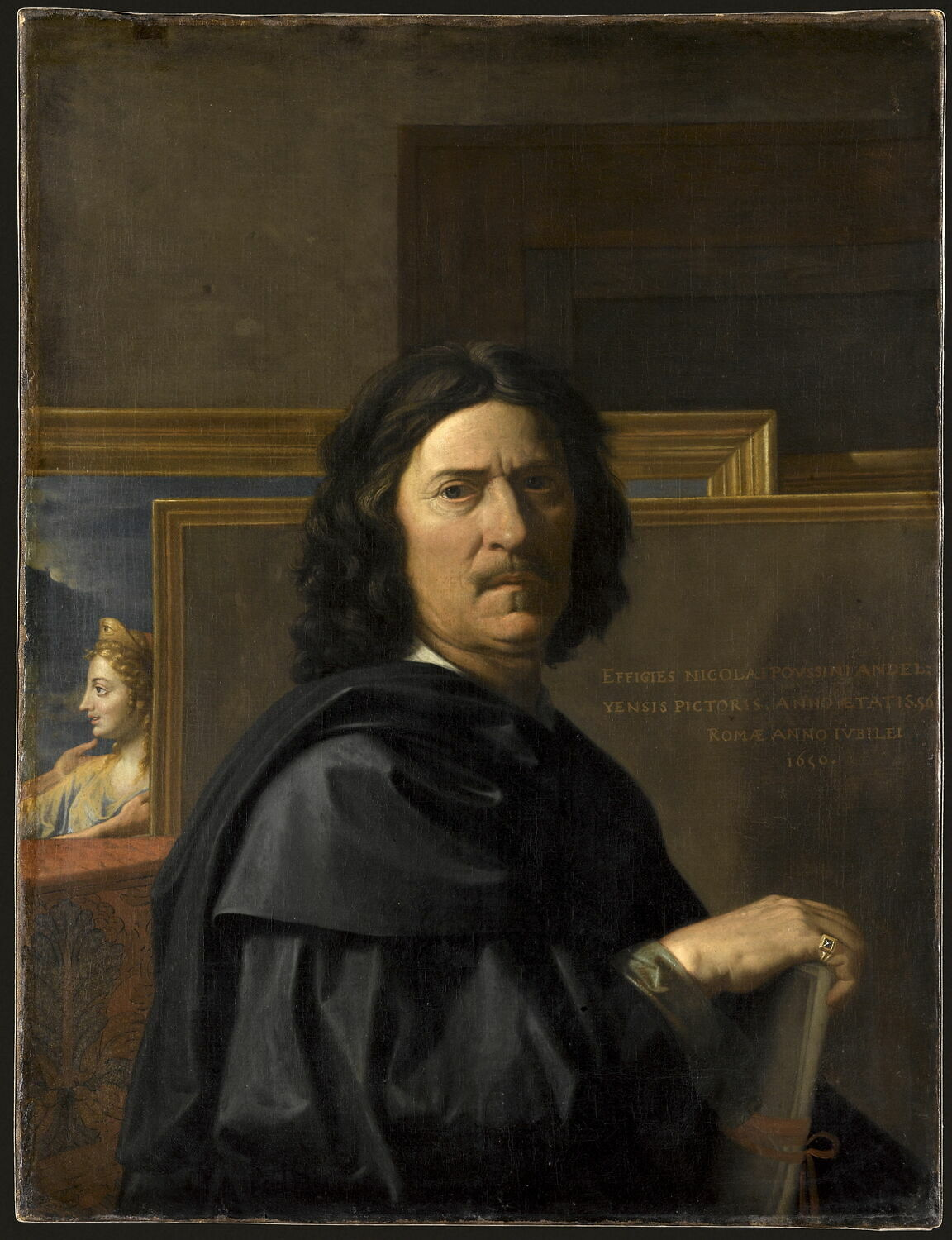
Nicolas Poussin, self portrait

- June – Nicolas Poussin, painter (d. 1665)
- 8 December – Pierre Petit, astronomer, physicist, mathematician and instrument maker (d. 1677)

=== Full date missing ===
- Charles Audran, engraver (d. 1674)
- Noël Quillerier, painter (d. 1669)
- Pierre de Saint-Joseph, French Cistercian monk, philosopher, and theologian (d. 1662)
- Jacques de Serisay, poet, intendant of the duc de La Rochefoucauld, and the founding director of the Académie française (d. 1653)

== Deaths ==
- 29 December – Jean Châtel (b. 1575)

=== Full date missing ===
- Charles II de Bourbon-Vendôme, prince and cardinal (b. 1562)
- Claude Dupuy, jurist, humanist, and bibliophile, (b. 1545)
