= Diego Ruiz =

Diego Ruiz may refer to:

- Diego Ruiz (skier) (born 1977), Spanish cross-country skier
- Diego Ruiz (footballer) (born 1980), Argentine footballer
- Diego Ruiz (runner) (born 1982), Spanish middle-distance runner
- Diego Ruiz de Montoya (1562–1632), Spanish Jesuit theologian
- Diego Ruiz Ortiz (1532–1571), Augustinian missionary and martyr in Peru
- Diego Ruiz Restrepo (born 1990), Colombian serial killer in Chile
- Quas (video gamer) or Diego Ruiz
