= 1584 in France =

- Decades: 1560s; 1570s; 1580s; 1590s; 1600s
- See also: History of France; Timeline of French history; List of years in France

Events from the year 1584 in France.

== Incumbents ==
- Monarch – Henry III

== Events ==
- 31 December – Treaty of Joinville

== Births ==
=== Full date missing ===
- André Duchesne, historian and geographer (d.1640)
- Mathieu Molé, statesman (d.1656)

== Deaths ==
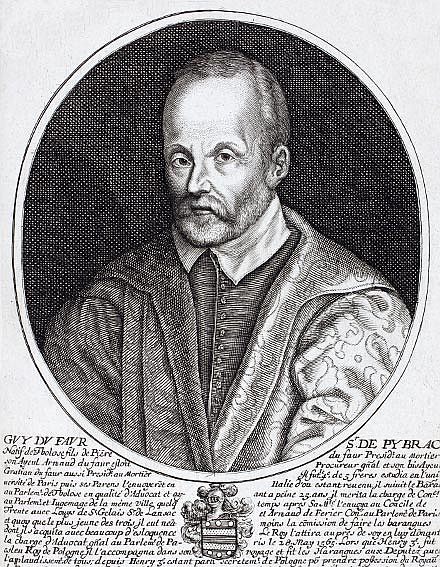
Guy Du Faur, Seigneur de Pibrac

- June 10- François, Duke of Anjou, youngest son of King Henry II of France and Catherine de' Medici.(b.1555)

=== Full date missing ===
- Claude de La Baume, bishop and cardinal (b.1534)
- François Dubois, painter (b.1529)
- Gentian Hervetus, theologian (b.1499)
- Guy Du Faur, Seigneur de Pibrac, jurist and poet (b.1529)
- Pierre Reymond, enamelist (b.1513)
- Paul de Foix, prelate and diplomat (b.1528)
