= 1601 in France =

- Decades: 1580s; 1590s; 1600s; 1610s; 1620s
- See also: History of France; Timeline of French history; List of years in France

Events from the year 1601 in France.

== Incumbents ==
- Monarch – Henry IV

== Events ==
- 17 January – Treaty of Lyon: France gains Bresse, Bugey and Gex from Savoy, ceding Saluzzo in exchange

== Births ==
- 27 May – Antoine Daniel, Jesuit missionary to French North America (d.1648)
- 17 July – Emmanuel Maignan, physicist and theologian (d.1676)
- 22 August – Georges de Scudéry, novelist, dramatist and poet (d.1667)
- 22 September – Anne of Austria, queen consort(d.1666)
- 27 September – Louis XIII (d.1643)
- 7 October – Florimond de Beaune, mathematician (d.1652)

=== Full date missing ===
- Jacques Gaffarel, librarian and astrologer (d.1681)
- Catherine Lepère, midwife (d.1679)

== Deaths ==
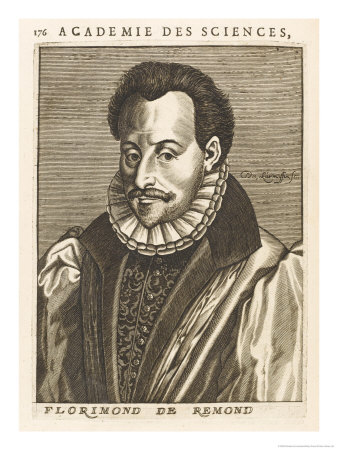
Florimond de Raemond

- 29 January – Louise of Lorraine, queen consort (b.1553)
- 11 June – Françoise d'Orléans-Longueville, princess (b.1549)
- 24 June – Henriette of Cleves, noblewoman (b.1542)
- 17 November – Florimond de Raemond, jurist and historian (b.1540)

=== Full date missing ===
- Germaine Cousin, saint (b.1579)
- Hugues Sambin, sculptor and woodworker (b.c.1520)
