= 1595 in France =

- Decades: 1570s; 1580s; 1590s; 1600s; 1610s
- See also: History of France; Timeline of French history; List of years in France

Events from the year 1595 in France.

== Incumbents ==
- Monarch – Henry IV

== Events ==
- 8 to 24 April – Siege of Calais
- 5 June – Battle of Fontaine-Française
- 20 to 26 June – Siege of Le Catelet
- 14 to 31 July – Siege of Doullens

== Births ==
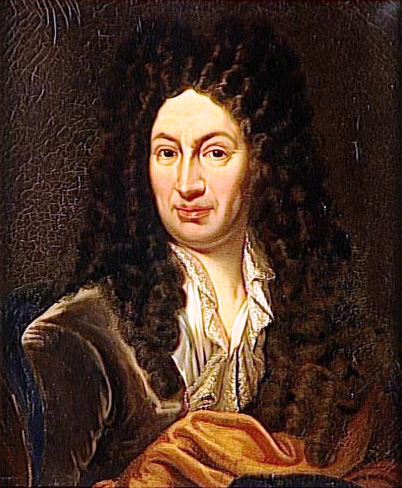
Jean Chapelain

=== Full date missing ===
- Jean Chapelain, poet (died 1674)
- Jean Desmarets, writer and dramatist (died 1676)
- Claude de Mesmes, comte d'Avaux, diplomat (died 1650)
- Henri II de Montmorency, nobleman and military commander (died 1632)
- Jean Ballesdens, lawyer and editor (died 1675)

== Deaths ==
=== Full date missing ===
- André de Brancas, admiral
- Henri I d'Orléans, duc de Longueville, aristocrat (born 1568)
