= 1575 in France =

- Decades: 1550s; 1560s; 1570s; 1580s; 1590s
- See also: History of France; Timeline of French history; List of years in France

Events from the year 1575 in France.

== Incumbents ==
- Monarch – Henry III

== Events ==
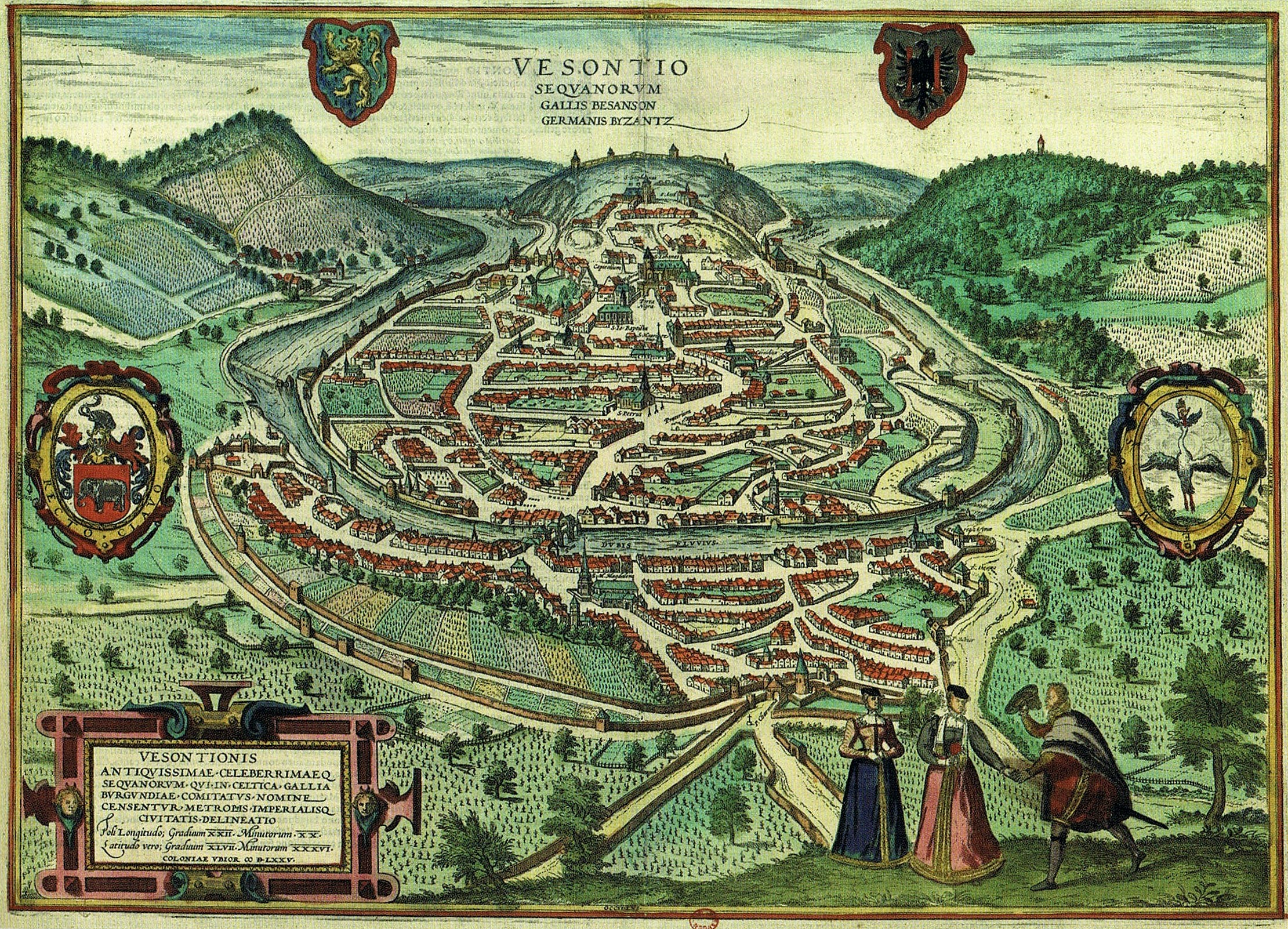
Cavalier view of Besançon, painted by Pierre d'Argent in 1575

- 1 to 7 March – Battle of Dormans
- 21 June – Battle of Besançon

== Births ==
=== Full date missing ===
- Jean Châtel, assassin (d.1594)
- Henri de Schomberg, Marshall of France (d.1632)

== Deaths ==
- November 1 - Simon Vigor, Catholic bishop (b c.1515)
- December 18 - Jean de Nogaret de La Valette, military officer (b.1527)

=== Date Unknown ===
- Gaspard de Saulx, military leader (b.1509)
- Claude of France, Duchess consort of Lorraine (b.1547)
