= 1576 in France =

- Decades: 1550s; 1560s; 1570s; 1580s; 1590s
- See also: History of France; Timeline of French history; List of years in France

Events from the year 1576 in France.

== Incumbents ==
- Monarch – Henry III

== Events ==
- 6 May – Edict of Beaulieu

== Births ==
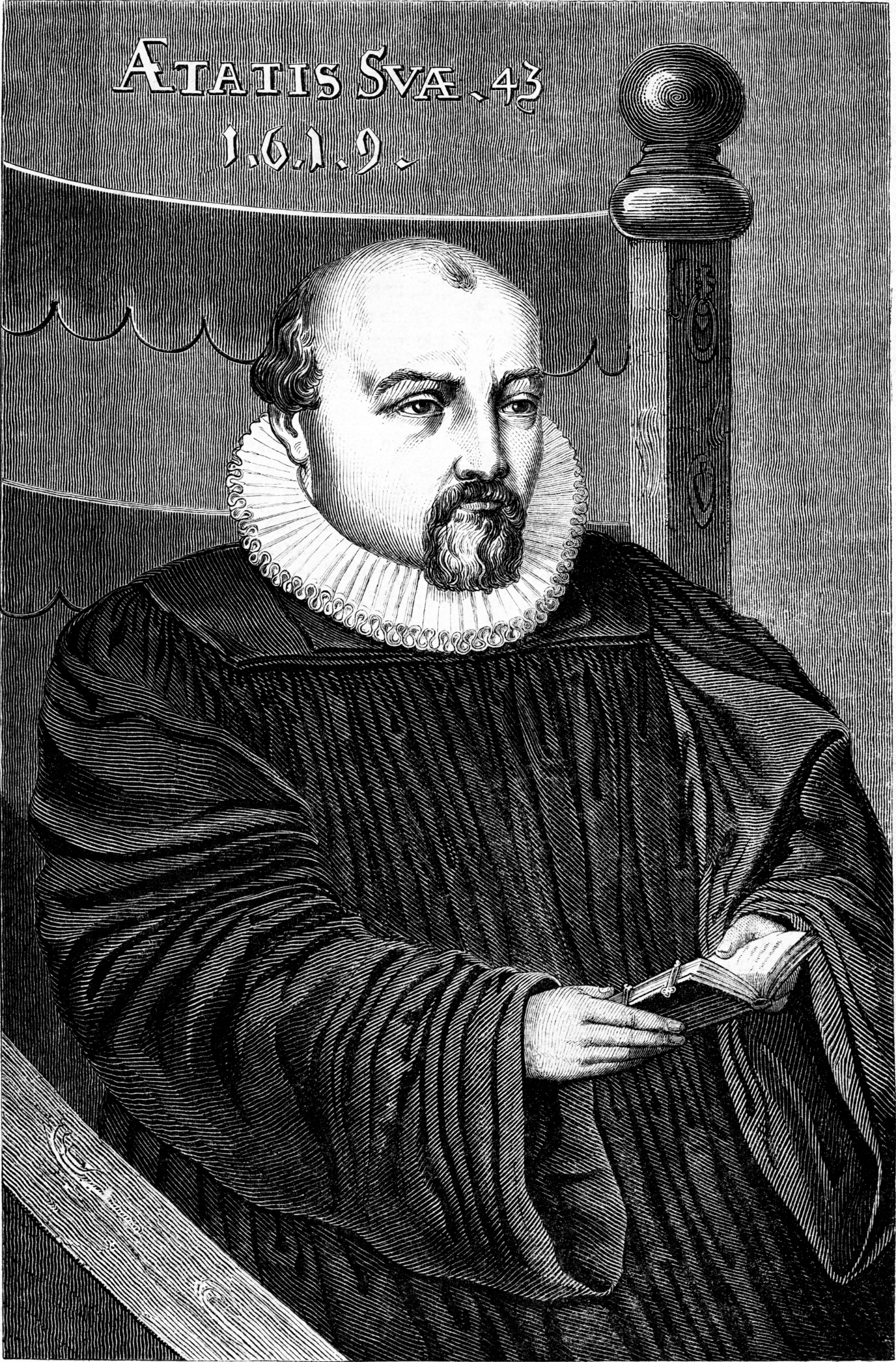
Salomon de Caus

=== Full date missing ===
- Salomon de Caus, Huguenot engineer (died 1626)
- Jean Ogier de Gombauld, playwright (died 1666)
- Bucherius, Jesuit and chronological scholar (died 1665)

== Deaths ==
=== Full date missing ===
- Adam de Craponne, engineer (born 1526)
- John III, Count of Ligny, nobleman
