= 1591 in France =

- Decades: 1570s; 1580s; 1590s; 1600s; 1610s
- See also: History of France; Timeline of French history; List of years in France

Events from the year 1591 in France.

== Incumbents ==
- Monarch – Henry IV

== Events ==
- Siege of Rouen

== Births ==
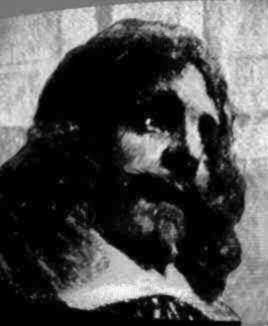
Girard Desargues

- March 15 – Alexandre de Rhodes, Jesuit missionary (d.1660)

=== Date Unknown ===
- Girard Desargues, mathematician (d. 1661)

== Deaths ==
- May 4 – Hugues Doneau, law professor (b.1527).

=== Date Unknown ===
- Barnabé Brisson, jurist and politician (b.1531)
- Noël du Fail, jurist and writer (b.c.1520)
- Edmond Auger, Jesuit (b.1530)
- Claude de Sainctes, Catholic controversialist (b.1525)
