= Thomas Lupton (16th-century writer) =

English polemical writer

Thomas Lupton (fl. 1572–1584) was an English polemical writer of the reign of Elizabeth I. His two-part work Siuqila of 1580–1 could be described as "the first Puritan utopia". Biographical details for Lupton, beyond his list of publications, are not available.

== Chronological list of works ==
- Commendatory verse for The bathes of Bathes ayde (1572) by the Welsh physician John Jones, a work on spa waters. Jones dedicated it to George Talbot, 6th Earl of Shrewsbury.
- Commendatory verse for Allarme to England (1578) by Barnabe Rich, with those by Thomas Churchyard and Barnabe Googe.
- All for Money (1578), a morality play with numerous personified characters. This was a traditional dramatic interlude, and the work was without dedication.
- A Thousand Notable Things of Sundry Sorts (1579) was a compilation, a popular work in the "wonder book" tradition. It ran to numerous editions into the 18th century, the last being in 1793. Sources included Lemnius and Mizaldus. It was dedicated to Margaret Stanley, Countess of Derby. The contents ranged from the use of the eagle-stone (aetites) in childbirth, to the beasts pulling the chariot of Elagabalus according to Aelius Lampridius.
- Siuqila (or Sivqila) was a dialogue, subtitle Too Good to be True, appearing in 1580 (first part, dedicated to Christopher Hatton), and 1581 (second part, dedicated to William Cecil). It made use of reversed names from Latin: Siuqila is from the Latin aliquis (anyone) backwards, a traveller from Ailgna (from Anglia, England), and another character is Omen (from Latin nemo or nobody). The idealised society Mauqsun described is named from the Latin nusquam, nowhere. The use of these terms is a tribute to the wordplay in Utopia of Thomas More, which may derived from the Greek as outopia, no place. Lupton's work has been compared to A Pleasant Dialogue (1579) by T. N. (Thomas Nicholls), dedicated to Edward Dyer.
- A Persuasion from Papistrie (1581), dedicated to Elizabeth I. It mentioned John Nicolls, an apostate Catholic priest, who was then attacked in an anonymous work by Robert Parsons that made a dismissive comment about Lupton.
- The Christian Against the Jesuit (1582), reply to the anonymous work of Parsons, dedicated to Francis Walsingham.
- A Dream of the Devil and Dives (1584). There was a later edition in 1615.
