= 1580 in France =

- Decades: 1560s; 1570s; 1580s; 1590s; 1600s
- See also: History of France; Timeline of French history; List of years in France

Events from the year 1580 in France.

== Incumbents ==
- Monarch – Henry III

== Events ==
- March 1 – Michel de Montaigne signs the preface to his most significant work, Essays. They are published later the same year.

== Births ==
- April 24 – Vincent de Paul, French priest and saint (d. 1660)
- September 15 – Charles Annibal Fabrot, French lawyer (d. 1659)
- December 1 – Nicolas-Claude Fabri de Peiresc, French astronomer (d. 1637)

=== Date unknown ===
- Pierre Vernier, French mathematician and instrument inventor (d. 1637)
- Benjamin, Duke of Soubise, French Huguenot leader (d. 1642)

== Deaths ==
- September 20 – Honorat II of Savoy, French Navy admiral (b.1511)

=== Date unknown ===
- Renée de Dinteville - Princess-Abbess of Remiremont (b. unknown)
- Anne de Pisseleu d'Heilly - French noblewoman and King Francis I's mistress (b.1508)
