= 1589 in France =

- Decades: 1560s; 1570s; 1580s; 1590s; 1600s
- See also: History of France; Timeline of French history; List of years in France

Events from the year 1589 in France.

== Incumbents ==
- Monarch – Henry III (until August 2), then Henry IV

== Events ==
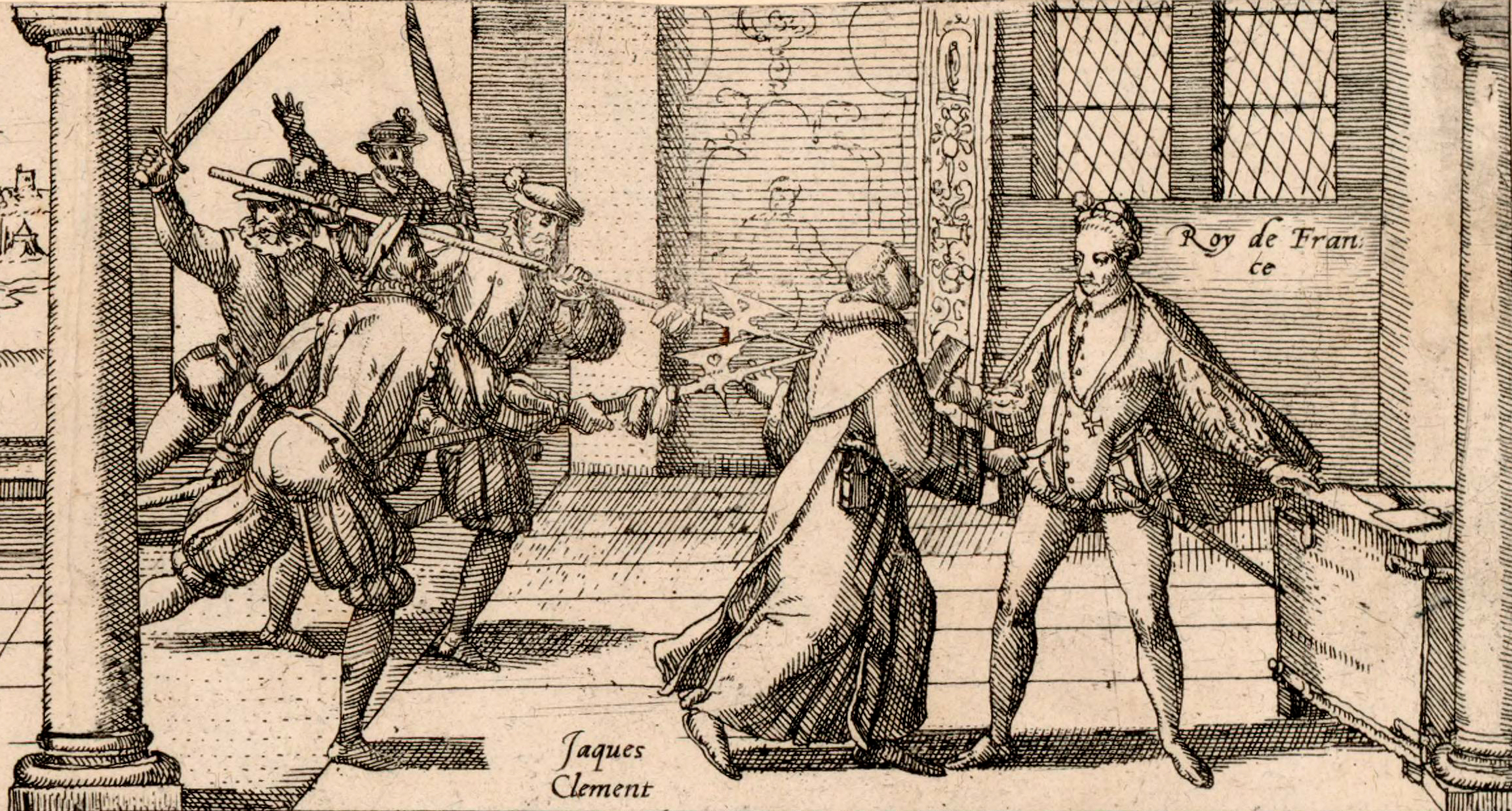
Assassination of Henry III of France

- August 1 – Henry III was stabbed with a knife, and died the next day. Henry IV of France's succession was followed by a four-year long war.
- 15 to 16 September – Battle of Arques

== Births ==
- May 28 – Robert Arnauld d'Andilly, Conseiller d'Etat (d.1674)

=== Full date missing ===
- Jérôme Bignon, lawyer (d.1656)
- Jean Sirmond, poet (d.1649)

== Deaths ==
- January 5 – Catherine de' Medici, Italian noblewoman and Queen of France (b. 1519 in Italy)
- August 1 – Jacques Clément, conspirator and the killer of king Henry III (b.1567)
- August 2 – Henry III of France, King of France from 1574 to 1589 (b.1551)
- September 19 – Jean-Antoine de Baïf, poet (b. 1532)
- Charles Dançay, French diplomat (b. 1510)
