= 1598 in France =

- Decades: 1570s; 1580s; 1590s; 1600s; 1610s
- See also: History of France; Timeline of French history; List of years in France

Events from the year 1598 in France.

== Incumbents ==
- Monarch – Henry IV

== Events ==
- April – signing of the Edict of Nantes.
- 2 May – Peace of Vervins

== Births ==
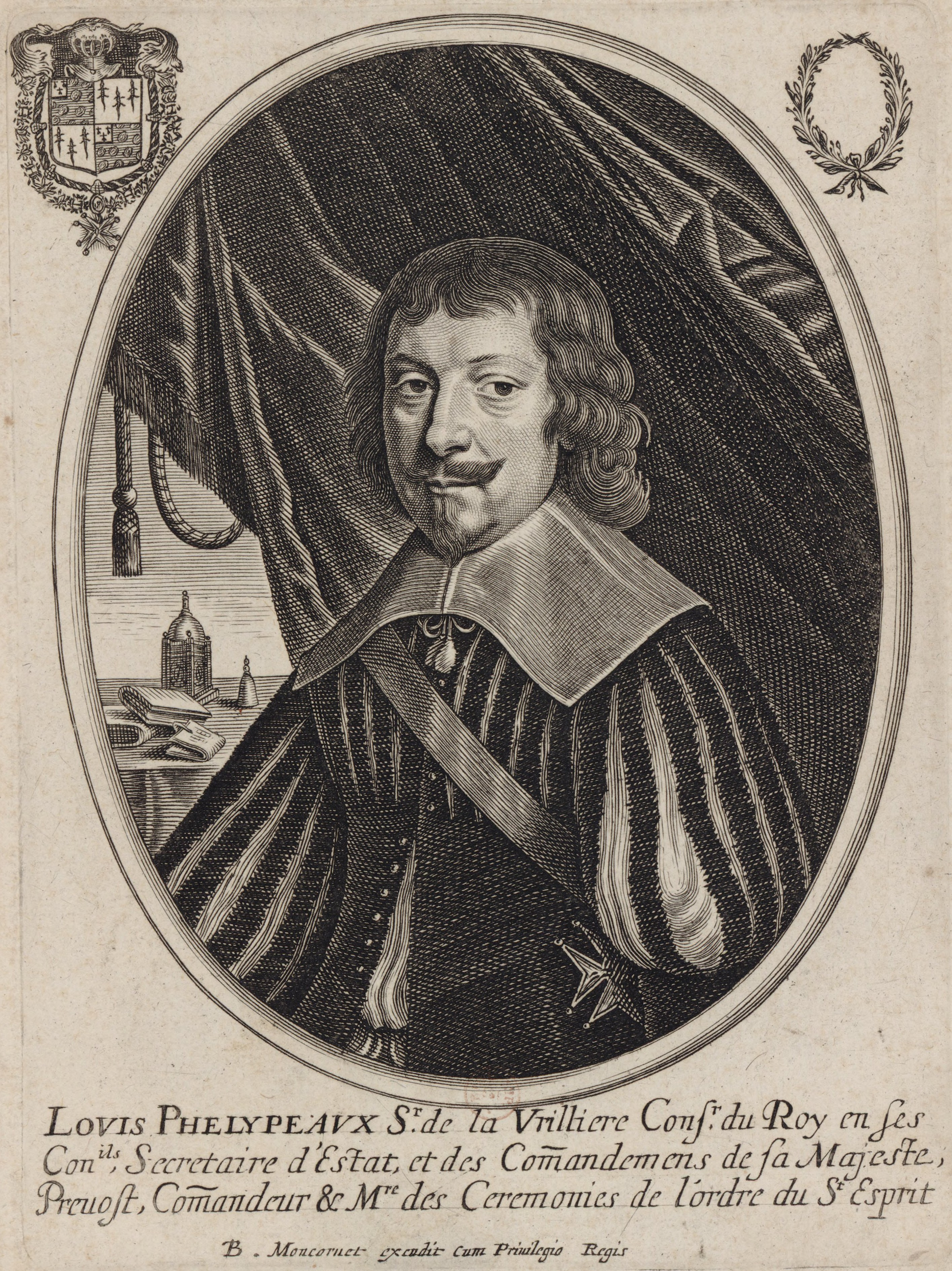
Louis Phélypeaux, seigneur de La Vrillière

=== Date Unknown ===
- Louis Phélypeaux, seigneur de La Vrillière, politician (d.1681)
- Helene Boullé (d.1684)
- Michel Villedo, stonemason, advisor and architect (d.1667)

== Deaths ==
=== Date Unknown ===
- Jean de Serres, historian (b. 1540)
- René Boyvin, engraver (b.1525)
- Guillaume Le Bé, punch cutter and engraver (b.1525)
