= 1579 in France =

- Decades: 1550s; 1560s; 1570s; 1580s; 1590s
- See also: History of France; Timeline of French history; List of years in France

Events from the year 1579 in France.

== Incumbents ==
- Monarch – Henry III

== Events ==
- April 10 – In the village of Cuers, near Toulon, peasants rebel and kill around 600 nobles and upper-class gentlemen of the Catholic League serving the Count of Carces.
- December 25 – Protestant French troops, under the command of Matthieu Merle, seized the capital of Gévaudan, Mende.

== Births ==
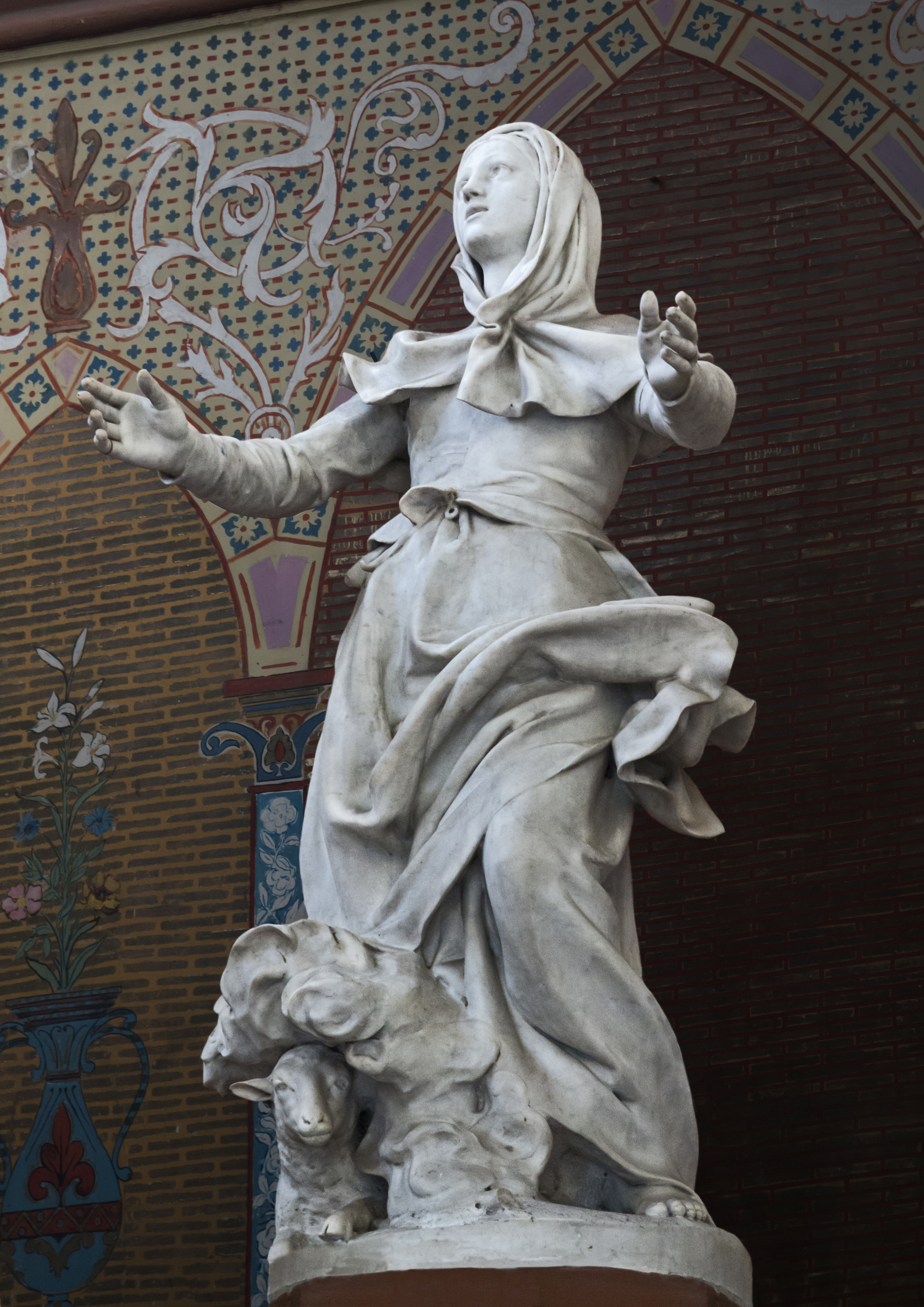
Marble statue of Saint Germaine Cousin

- August 18 – Countess Charlotte Flandrina of Nassau, fourth daughter of William the Silent (d. 1640).
- August 21 – Henri, Duke of Rohan, French soldier, writer and leader of the Huguenots (d. 1638).

=== Date unknown ===
- Germaine Cousin, French saint (d. 1601).
- Étienne de la Croix, Jesuit missionary and writer (d. 1643).

== Deaths ==
- April 12 – Jean de Monluc, French clergyman and diplomat (b. 1508).
- May 6 – François de Montmorency, French noble, governor of Île de France and 2nd Duke of Montmorency (b. 1530).

=== Date unknown ===
- Claude de Rohan-Gié, French lady-in-waiting, and a mistress of King Francis I of France (b. 1519).
