= 1583 in France =

- Decades: 1560s; 1570s; 1580s; 1590s; 1600s
- See also: History of France; Timeline of French history; List of years in France

Events from the year 1583 in France.

== Incumbents ==
- Monarch – Henry III

== Events ==
- January 18 – François, Duke of Anjou, attacks Antwerp.

== Births ==
- Charles de La Vieuville
- Jean de Lauson

== Deaths ==
- November 24 – René de Birague, French cardinal and chancellor (b. 1506)
