= 1582 in France =

- Decades: 1560s; 1570s; 1580s; 1590s; 1600s
- See also: History of France; Timeline of French history; List of years in France

Events from the year 1582 in France.

== Incumbents ==
- Monarch – Henry III

== Events ==
- July 26 – Battle of Ponta Delgada (War of the Portuguese Succession): Spanish admiral Santa Cruz decisively defeats a larger mercenary fleet from France, England, supporters of Portuguese claimant António, Prior of Crato, and the Dutch Republic under Filippo di Piero Strozzi (who is killed) off the Azores. It is the first engagement between large fleets of galleons operating at any great distance from the mainland.
- December 9 (Julian) (December 19 Gregorian) – France discards the Julian calendar at the end of the day and adopts the Gregorian calendar at midnight. Sunday, December 9 is followed the next day in France by Monday, December 20.

== Births ==
- November 21 – François Maynard, French poet (d. 1646).
- November 27 – Pierre Dupuy, French historian (d. 1651).

== Deaths ==
- January 23 – Jean Bauhin, French physician (b. 1511).
- July 17 – Jacques Peletier du Mans, French mathematician (b. 1517).
- October 21 – Laurent Joubert, French physician (b. 1529).
