= 1600 in France =

- Decades: 1580s; 1590s; 1600s; 1610s; 1620s
- See also: History of France; Timeline of French history; List of years in France

Events from the year 1600 in France.

== Incumbents ==
- Monarch – Henry IV

== Events ==
- April 4 – a contract for marriage between king Henry IV and Marie de Medici was signed in Florence.
- August- King Henry IV declares war on Charles Emmanuel of Savoy and shortly after the French army invaded Savoy starting the Franco-Savoyard War of 1600–1601.
- October 5 – a proxy Marriage between king Henry IV and Marie de Medici was held in Florence.

== Births ==
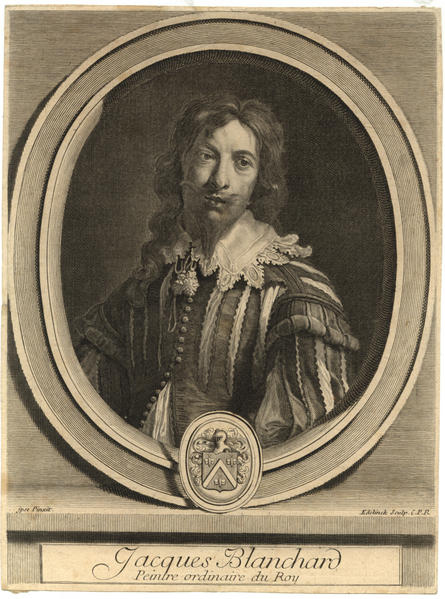
Jacques Blanchard

- February 2 – Gabriel Naudé, French librarian and scholar (d. 1653)
- February 9 – Jean-Joseph Surin, French Jesuit writer (d. 1665)
- April 11 – Jacques Buteux, French missionary (d. 1652)
- July 1 – George Gobat, French theologian (d. 1679)
- July 22 - Michel de Marolles, French translator and churchman (d. 1681)
- August 24 – Antoine de Laloubère, French Jesuit mathematician (d. 1664)
- December 20 – Nicolas Sanson, French cartographer (d. 1667)
- December 12 – Denis of the Nativity, sailor and cartographer (d.1638)

=== Full date missing ===
- Jacques Blanchard, painter (d.1638)
- December - Marie de Rohan, aristocrat (d.1679)
- Marin le Roy de Gomberville, poet and novelist (died 1674)

=== Probable ===
- Martine Bertereau, French mineralogist
- Claude Lorrain, French Baroque painter, draughtsman and engraver (d. 1682)

== Deaths ==
- September 25 – Antoine du Verdier, French politician (b. 1544)
- September 26 – Claude Le Jeune, French composer (b. 1530)

=== Full date missing ===
- Gilles de Noailles, ambassador (b.1524)
