= 1588 in France =

- Decades: 1560s; 1570s; 1580s; 1590s; 1600s
- See also: History of France; Timeline of French history; List of years in France

Events from the year 1588 in France.

== Incumbents ==
- Monarch – Henry III

== Events ==
- 12 May – The Day of the Barricades in Paris

== Births ==
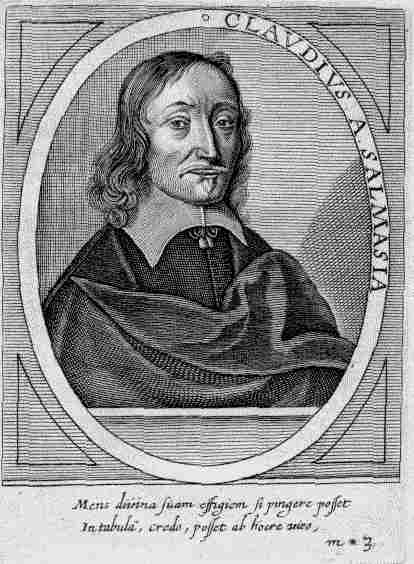
Claudius Salmasius

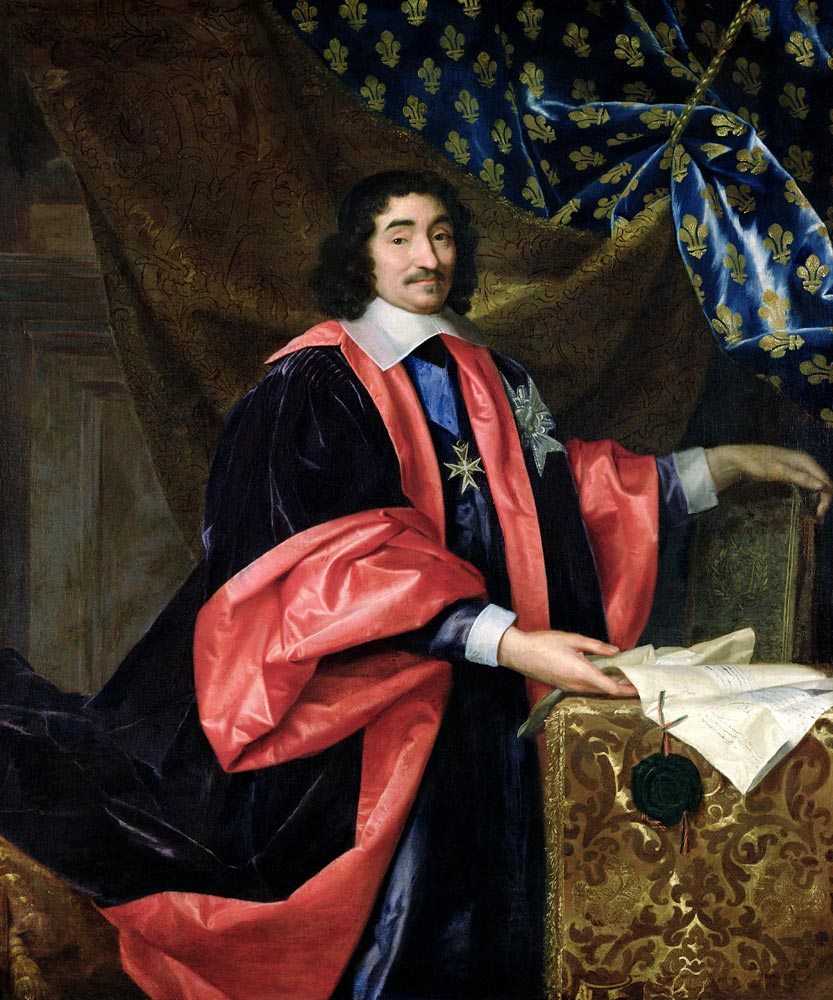
Pierre Séguier

=== Full date missing ===
- Pierre Séguier, statesman, chancellor of France (d.1672)
- Guillaume Bautru, satirical poet (d.1665)
- Claude Deruet, painter (d.1660)
- Étienne Pascal (d.1651)
- Louis Cellot, Jesuit (d.1658)
- Marin Mersenne, theologian, mathematician and music theorist (d.1648)
- Claudius Salmasius, classical scholar (d.1653)

== Deaths ==
- 5 March – Henri I, Prince of Condé (b.1552)

=== Full date missing ===
- Jean Daurat, poet and scholar (b.1508)
