= 1602 in France =

- Decades: 1580s; 1590s; 1600s; 1610s; 1620s
- See also: History of France; Timeline of French history; List of years in France

Events from the year 1602 in France.

== Incumbents ==
- Monarch – Henry IV

== Events ==
- January 26: Maximilien de Béthune, Duke of Sully becomes the governor of the Bastille.
- June 14: Charles de Gontaut-Biron is arrested for Treason
- July 15: Claude de La Trémoille sells the Château de Sully-sur-Loire to Maximilien de Béthune
- July 31: Charles de Gontaut-Biron is executed on the Bastille

== Births ==
- January 31 – Adam Billaut, poet, carpenter (d. 1662)
- February 2 – Jeanne des Anges, Ursuline nun in Loudun (d. 1665)
- March 18 – Jacques de Billy, Jesuit mathematician (d. 1679)
- May 26 – Philippe de Champaigne, painter (d. 1674)
- July 8 – François Perrochel, cleric (d. 1682)
- July 14 – Cardinal Mazarin, statesman (d. 1661)
- August 10 – Gilles de Roberval, mathematician (died 1675)
- November 17 – Agnes of Jesus, Catholic nun (d. 1634)

=== Full date missing ===
- Charles Raymbault, Jesuit missionary (died 1643)
- Françoise-Marie Jacquelin (died 1645)
- Caesar, duc de Choiseul, marshal and diplomat (d. 1675)
- Antoine de l'Age, duc de Puylaurens, courtier (d. 1635)

== Deaths ==
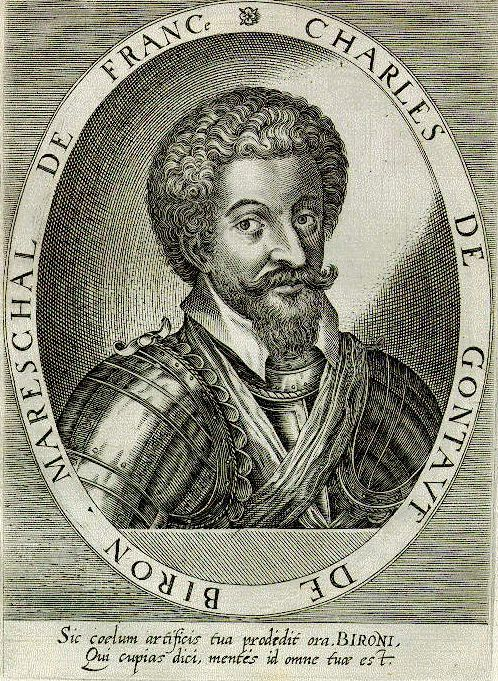
Charles de Gontaut, duc de Biron

- January – Claude Fauchet, French historian
- January 10 – Daniel Tossanus, theologian (born 1541)
- February 19 – Philippe Emmanuel, Duke of Mercœur, soldier (b. 1558)
- July 31 – Charles de Gontaut, duc de Biron, soldier (born 1562)
- September 14 – Jean Passerat, political satirist and poet (born 1534)
- October 13 – Franciscus Junius, theologian (b. 1545)
- October 30 – Jean-Jacques Boissard, poet (born 1528)
- November 22 – Toussaint Dubreuil, painter (born c.1561)
