= 1592 in France =

- Decades: 1570s; 1580s; 1590s; 1600s; 1610s
- See also: History of France; Timeline of French history; List of years in France

Events from the year 1592 in France.

== Incumbents ==
- Monarch – Henry IV

== Events ==
- December 1591 to May 1592 – Siege of Rouen
- 21 to 24 May – Battle of Craon

== Births ==
- 22 January – Pierre Gassendi, philosopher, scientist, mathematician and astronomer (died 1655)
- 10 July – Pierre d'Hozier, genealogist (died 1660)
- 1 August – François le Métel de Boisrobert, poet and playwright (died 1662)
- 18 September – Jean Guyon, patriarch (died 1663)
- November – Françoise de Lorraine, Duchess of Vendôme (died 1669)
- Approximate date – Angélique Paulet, salonnière, singer, musician and actress (died 1651)

== Deaths ==
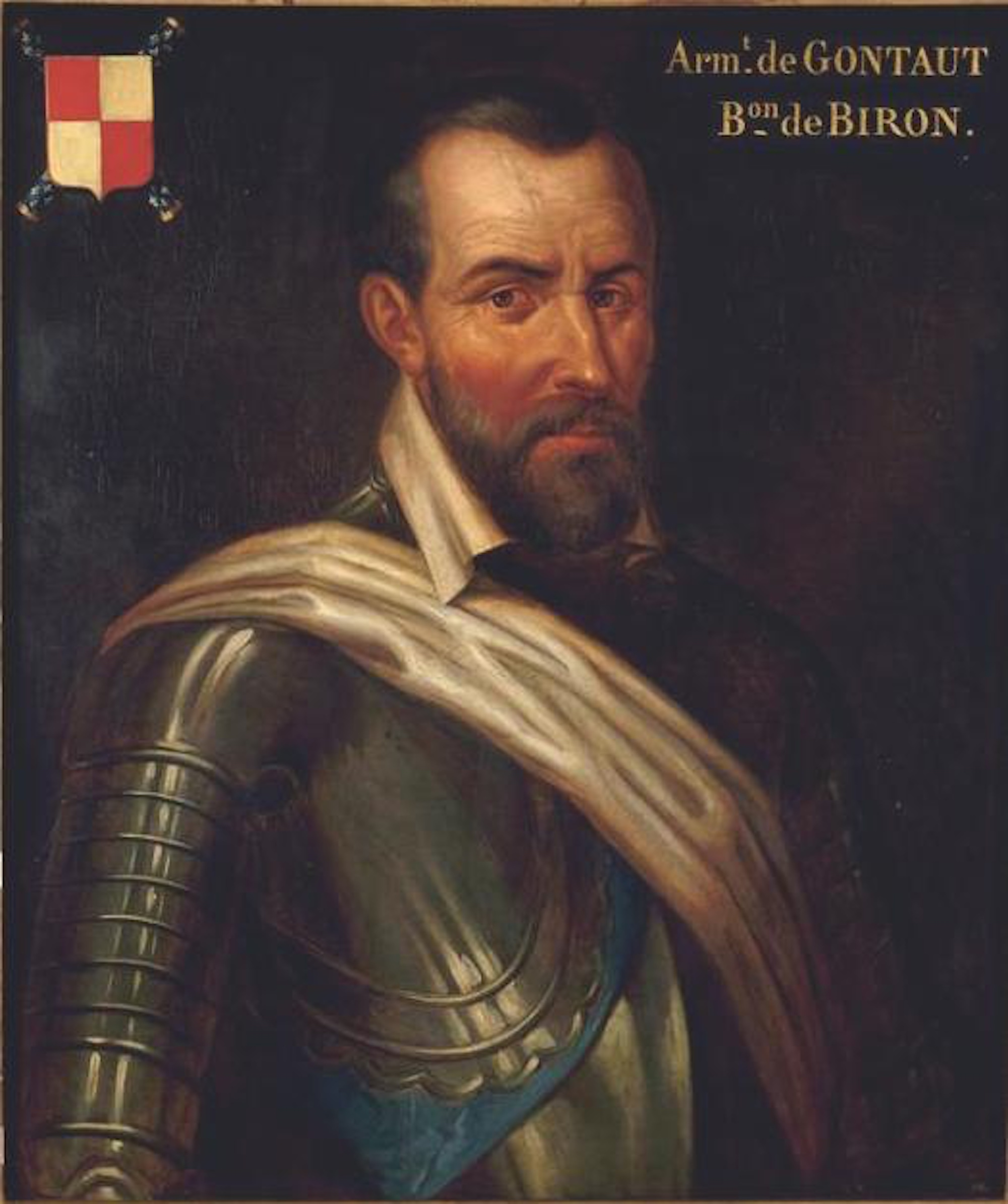
Armand de Gontaut, baron de Biron

- 26 July – Armand de Gontaut, baron de Biron, soldier (born 1524)
- 13 September – Michel de Montaigne, philosopher and essayist (born 1533)
- 27 October – Michel de Castelnau, soldier and diplomat (born c.1520)
