= Diego Ruiz de Montoya =

Spanish theologian (1562–1632)

Diego Ruiz de Montoya (born 1562 in Seville, died 15 March 1632 in Seville) was a Spanish Jesuit theologian.

== Life ==
He entered the Society of Jesus in 1572 and was professed on 22 July 1592. He taught philosophy in Granada, moral theology for one year in Baeza, and theology for about twenty years in Cordova and Seville. For a time he was rector of the College of Cordova, and represented his province, Andalusia, at the Sixth General Congregation.

The last years of his life were devoted to writing. His distinguishing characteristics seem to have been humility, a retiring disposition, and integrity. He declined to advise the citizens of Seville to pay a certain tribute, even though the Duke of Lerma promised to obtain permission from Pope Paul V to publish his manuscripts, De Auxiliis, if he furthered his plans.

Fray Miguel de San José considers him a most finished theologian; Jean Raymond Merlin a prudent student and faithful interpreter of the Church Fathers, and Kleutgen and Menéndez Pelayo think that he combined positive historic theology with scholastic theology, in a manner not achieved by the theologians who preceded him.

== Works ==
His published works are:

- "Doctrine Christiana", written by command of the Bishop of Cordova, published anonymously and several times reprinted;
- "Commentaria ac disputationes in primam partem D. Thomae"-
  - (a) "De Trinitate" (Lyons, 1625), his principal treatise and one of the best on this subject;
  - (b) "De praedestinatione ac reprobatione hominum et angelorum" (Lyons, 1628);
  - (c) "De scientia, ideis, veritate ac vita Dei" (Paris, 1629);
  - (d) "De voluntate Dei et propriis actibus ejus" (Lyons, 1630);
  - (e) "De providentia" (Lyons, 1631); (f) "De nominibus Dei".

These are rare editions.

In manuscript preserved in various libraries:

- "De auxiliis", two volumes classified as very good by Father Mutio Vitelleschi;
- "De angelis";
- "Commentarii in materiam de peccatis";
- "Controversiae et quaestiones theologicae";
- "De beneficiis parochialibus conferendis";
- "De eliminandis e republica comoediis vulgaribus";
- "De statu eorum, qui petunt dimissionem in Societate Jesu";
- "De causis dimittendi a Societate Jesu".
