= 1577 in France =

- Decades: 1550s; 1560s; 1570s; 1580s; 1590s
- See also: History of France; Timeline of French history; List of years in France

Events from the year 1577 in France.

== Incumbents ==
- Monarch – Henry III

== Events ==
- May 2 – La Charite falls to the besieging royal army followed by Issoire a month later, as part of the King's offensive against the Huguenots in the Sixth War of Religion.
- September 17 – The Treaty of Bergerac is signed between king Henry III and the Huguenots and ended the Sixth War of Religion.

== Births ==
- November 14 –François Leclerc du Tremblay. French Frier. (d.1638).
- December 25 – Noël Brûlart de Sillery, French diplomat (d.1640).

== Deaths ==
- January 23 – Nicolas of Lorraine, Duke of Mercœur (b.1524).
- March 25 – Louis III de La Trémoille French nobleman, (b.1521).
- July 24 – Blaise de Monluc, prolific French soldier. (b.1502).
