= Renée de Dinteville =

Renée de Dinteville (died 1580) was a German-Roman monarch as Princess Abbess of the Imperial Remiremont Abbey in France.

She belonged to the local noble family of courtiers in Lorraine, and she was elected Coadjutrice in 1565, and succeeded as abbess in 1570, upon pressure from duke Charles III of Lorraine. She was forced to accept Barbara of Salm as her successor in 1579.
