= 1581 in France =

- Decades: 1560s; 1570s; 1580s; 1590s; 1600s
- See also: History of France; Timeline of French history; List of years in France

Events from the year 1581 in France.

== Incumbents ==
- Monarch – Henry III

== Events ==
- King Henry III established a secret inner council to conduct state affairs in private, this council brought two men, Anne de Joyeuse and Jean Louis de la Valette to prominence in French politics.
- October 15 -The Ballet Comique de la Reine was performed in the great hall of the Petit Bourbon.

== Births ==
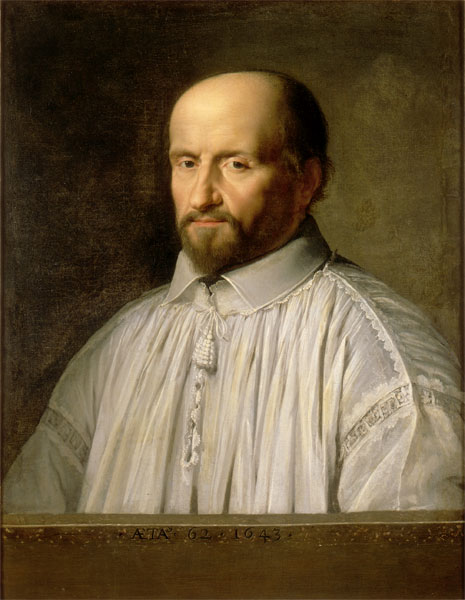
Jean du Vergier de Hauranne

=== Date unknown ===
- Jean du Vergier de Hauranne, Catholic priest (d.1643)
- Claude Bouthillier, statesman (d.1652)
- Claude Gaspard Bachet de Méziriac, mathematician, linguist and poet (d.1638)
- Jean-Baptiste d'Ornano, nobleman and Marshall of France (d.1626)
- Achille Harlay de Sancy, diplomat (d.1646)
- Clément Métezeau, engineer (d.1652)
- Jean Chalette (baptised 27 December), painter (d.1643)

== Deaths ==
- September 6 – Guillaume Postel, linguist (b.1510)
- September 30 – Hubert Languet, French diplomat and reformer (b. 1518)

=== Date Unknown ===
- Odet de Turnèbe, dramatist (b.1552)
- Georgette de Montenay, author (b.1540)
