= 1590 in France =

- Decades: 1570s; 1580s; 1590s; 1600s; 1610s
- See also: History of France; Timeline of French history; List of years in France

Events from the year 1590 in France.

== Incumbents ==
- Monarch – Henry IV

== Events ==
- 14 March – Battle of Ivry
- May to September – Siege of Paris

== Births ==
=== Full date missing ===
- François Perrier, painter (died 1650)

== Deaths ==
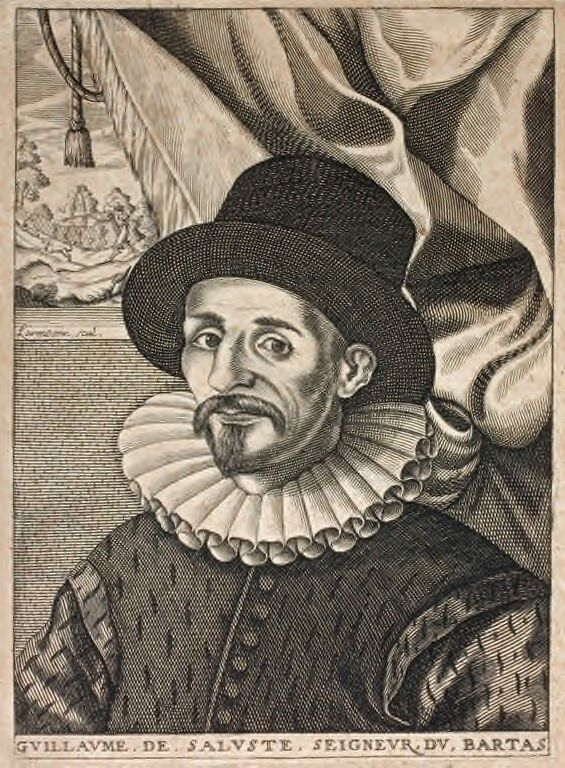
Guillaume de Salluste Du Bartas

=== Full date missing ===
- Guillaume de Salluste Du Bartas, poet (born 1544)
- André Thévet, priest, explorer and cosmographer (born 1516)
- Charles de Bourbon, cardinal (born 1523)
- Germain Pilon, sculptor (born c.1525)
- Jean Baptiste Androuet du Cerceau, architect (born 1544/47)
- Ambroise Paré, barber surgeon (born c.1510)
