= 1586 in France =

- Decades: 1560s; 1570s; 1580s; 1590s; 1600s
- See also: History of France; Timeline of French history; List of years in France

Events from the year 1586 in France.

== Incumbents ==
- Monarch – Henry III

== Births ==
- Jacques de Bela, lawyer and writer (died 1667)
- Antoine Boësset, musician (died 1643)
- Joseph Le Caron, Franciscan friar and missionary to Canada (died 1632)

== Deaths ==
- Jean de Ferrières, nobleman (born 1520)
- Jeanne de Gontaut, noblewoman (born c.1520)
- George de La Hèle, composer (born 1547 in Belgium)
- Gabrielle de Coignard, poet (born c. 1550)
