= 1587 in France =

- Decades: 1560s; 1570s; 1580s; 1590s; 1600s
- See also: History of France; Timeline of French history; List of years in France

Events from the year 1587 in France.

== Incumbents ==
- Monarch – Henry III

== Events ==
- 20 October – Huguenot and Royalist forces clashed at the Battle of Coutras. Hugeunots under Henry of Navarre won the battle.
- 26 October – Royalist forces commanded by Henry I, Duke of Guise won the Battle of Vimory.

=== Full dates missing ===
- Construction of Couvent des Feuillants was started.
- Guillaume Du Bartas was sent on a diplomatic mission to Scotland.
- Collège de France instituted Arabic lessons, with Arnoult de Lisle being the first professor of the chair of Arabic.

== Births ==
- 30 April – Éléonore de Bourbon, French princess (died 1619)
- 17 November – Charles Lallemant, French Jesuit (died 1674)

=== Full dates missing ===
- Catherine de Sainte-Maure, French courtier (died 1648)
- Didier Palleti, French bishop (died 1658)
- Isaac de Razilly, French noble (died 1635)
- Marin Boucher, French pioneer of North America (died 1671)
- Robert Giffard de Moncel, French surgeon (died 1668)

== Deaths ==
- 23 March – Charles de Rambouillet, French cardinal (born 1530)
- 11 May – Élie Vinet, French humanist (born 1509)
- 24 May – Diana of Foix (birth year unknown)
- 20 October – Anne de Joyeuse, French noble and commander (born 1560)
- 30 October – Charles de Vaudémont, French cardinal (born 1561)

=== Full dates missing ===
- Madeleine Des Roches, French writer (born 1520)
- Philibert du Croc, French diplomat (born 1515)
