= 1574 in France =

- Decades: 1550s; 1560s; 1570s; 1580s; 1590s
- See also: History of France; Timeline of French history; List of years in France

Events from 1574 in France.

== Incumbents ==
- Monarch – Charles IX (until May 30), then Henry III

== Events ==
- February 23 – The fifth War of Religion against the Huguenots begins in France.

== Births ==
=== Full date missing ===
- Daniel Dumonstier, artist (d.1646)

== Deaths ==
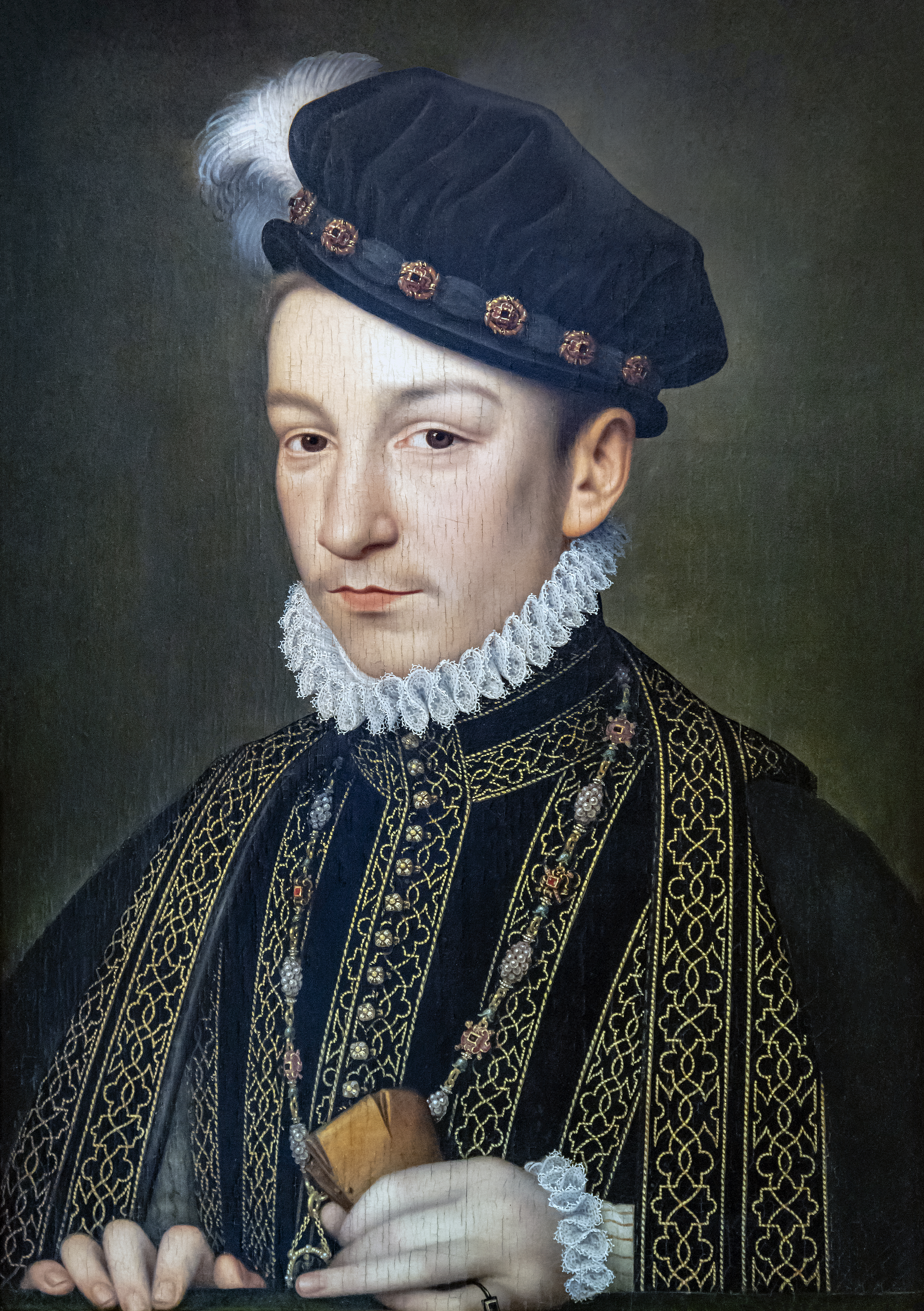
Charles IX, King of France 1560–1574

- May 30 – Charles IX of France (b. 1550)
- June 12 – Renée of France, Duchess of Ferrara (b.1510)
- September 15 – Margaret of Valois, Daughter of king Francis I, Duchess of Berry and Duchess of Savoy by marriage. (b.1523)

=== Full date missing ===
- Gabriel, comte de Montgomery, nobleman (b.1530)
- Joseph Boniface de La Môle, nobleman (b. c.1526)
- Antoine de Créqui Canaples, bishop and cardinal (b.1531)
- Charles, Cardinal of Lorraine, cardinal (b.1524)
