= 1597 in France =

- Decades: 1570s; 1580s; 1590s; 1600s; 1610s
- See also: History of France; Timeline of French history; List of years in France

Events from the year 1597 in France.

== Incumbents ==
- Monarch – Henry IV

== Events ==
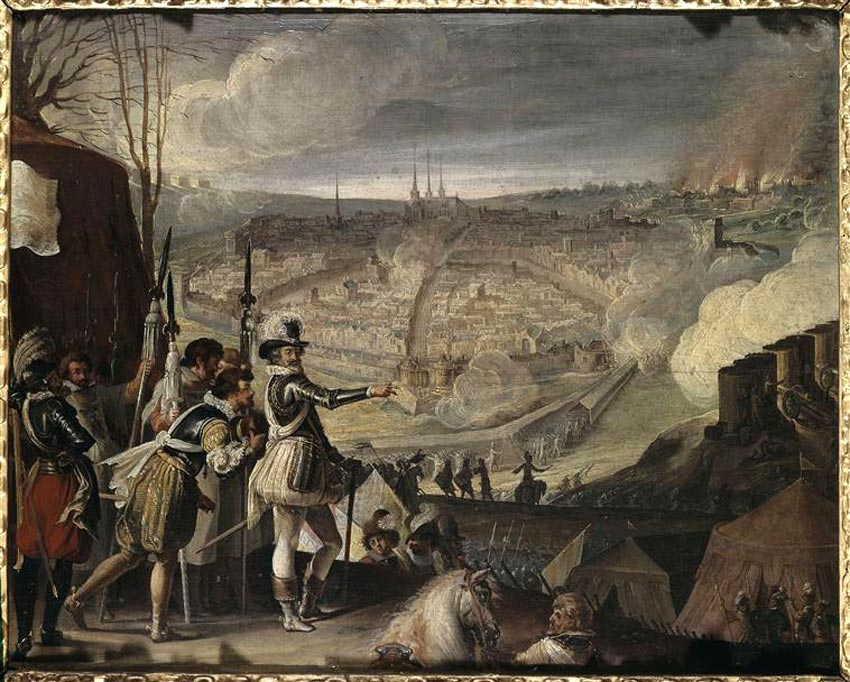
- Siege of Amiens
  March 11 - The French city of Amiens falls to Spanish tropes in a surprise attack by a small force disguised as peasants. This event is in the context of the French Wars of Religion and the Anglo-Spanish War (1585–1604).
- September 25 - The city of Amiens is liberated after a three months of siege by king Henry IV and his army.

== Births ==
- January 31 – John Francis Regis, French saint (d. 1640)
- February 24 – Vincent Voiture, French poet (d. 1648)
- May 31 – Jean-Louis Guez de Balzac, French writer and essayist (d.1654)

=== Date Unknown ===
- Charles Racquet, French organist and composer (d.1664)
- Jacques Linard, French painter (d.1645)
