= 1596 in France =

- Decades: 1570s; 1580s; 1590s; 1600s; 1610s
- See also: History of France; Timeline of French history; List of years in France

Events from the year 1596 in France.

== Incumbents ==
- Monarch – Henry IV

== Events ==
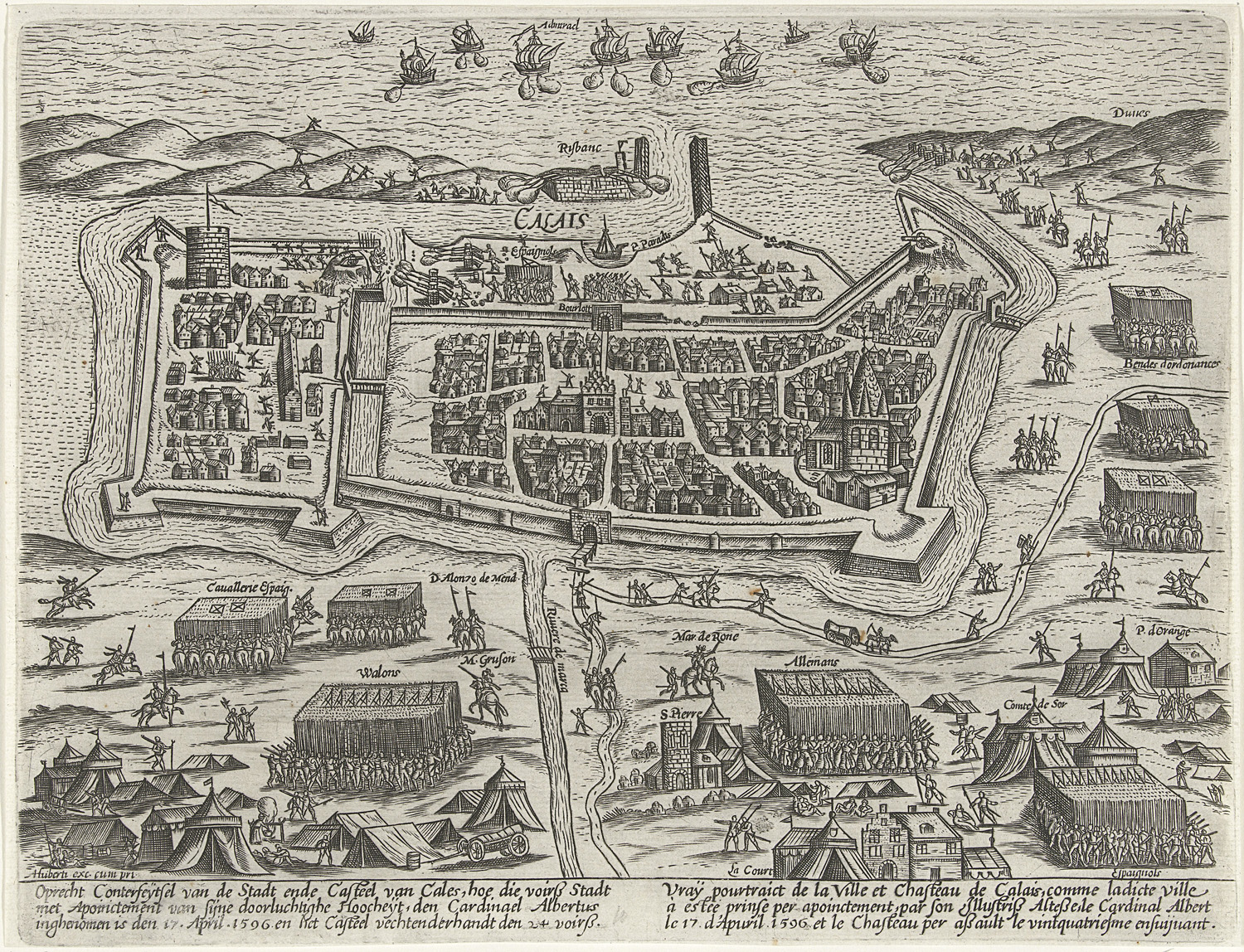
Engraving of the siege of Calais

- Siege of Calais
- Tract of alliance between England, France and the United Netherlands

== Births ==
- 31 March – René Descartes, French philosopher (died 1650 in Sweden)
- 6 June – Michel Particelli d'Émery (died 1650)
- 5 November – Charles II, Duke of Elbeuf, nobleman (died 1657)
- 11 November – Catherine Henriette de Bourbon (died 1663)

== Deaths ==
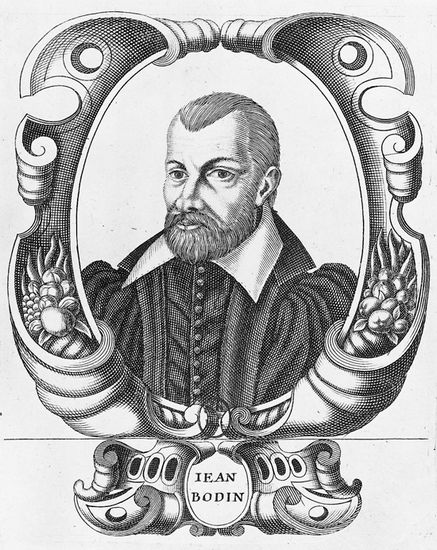
Jean Bodin

- 19 February – Blaise de Vigenère, diplomat, cryptographer, translator and alchemist (born 1523)
- 5 May – Catherine de Montpensier, politically active duchess (born 1552)
- 3 October – Florent Chrestien, satirist and poet (born 1541)
- 1 November – Pierre Pithou, lawyer and scholar (born 1539)

=== Full date missing ===
- Jean Bodin, philosopher and politician (born 1530)
- Madeleine de l’Aubespine, aristocrat and writer (born 1546)
