= 1599 in France =

- Decades: 1570s; 1580s; 1590s; 1600s; 1610s
- See also: History of France; Timeline of French history; List of years in France

Events from the year 1599 in France.

== Incumbents ==
- Monarch – Henry IV

== Events ==
- Paris is described in the Civitates Orbis Terrarum as the capital of France, and "the most fertile kingdom" in the world.
- Thomas Platter calls Paris “sans pair" (peerless), a unique city with a mild climate and pleasant atmosphere.

== Births ==
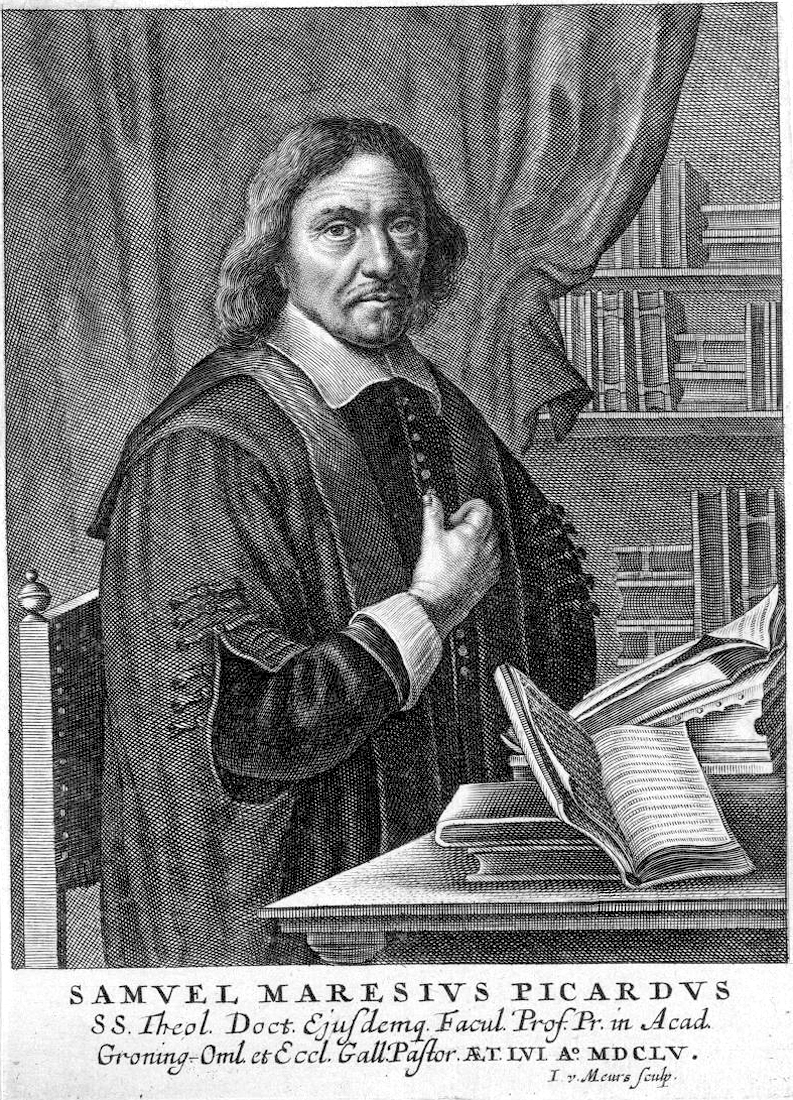
Samuel Maresius

- 11 October – Abraham de Fabert, marshall of France (d. 1662)
- Henri de La Ferté-Senneterre, marshal of France and governor of Lorraine (d. 1681)
- Henri de Talleyrand-Périgord, comte de Chalais (d. 1626)
- Samuel Maresius, Protestant theologian (died 1673)
- Madeleine de Souvré, marquise de Sablé, writer (d. 1678)
- Jean-François Senault, Augustinian philosopher (d. 1672)

== Deaths ==
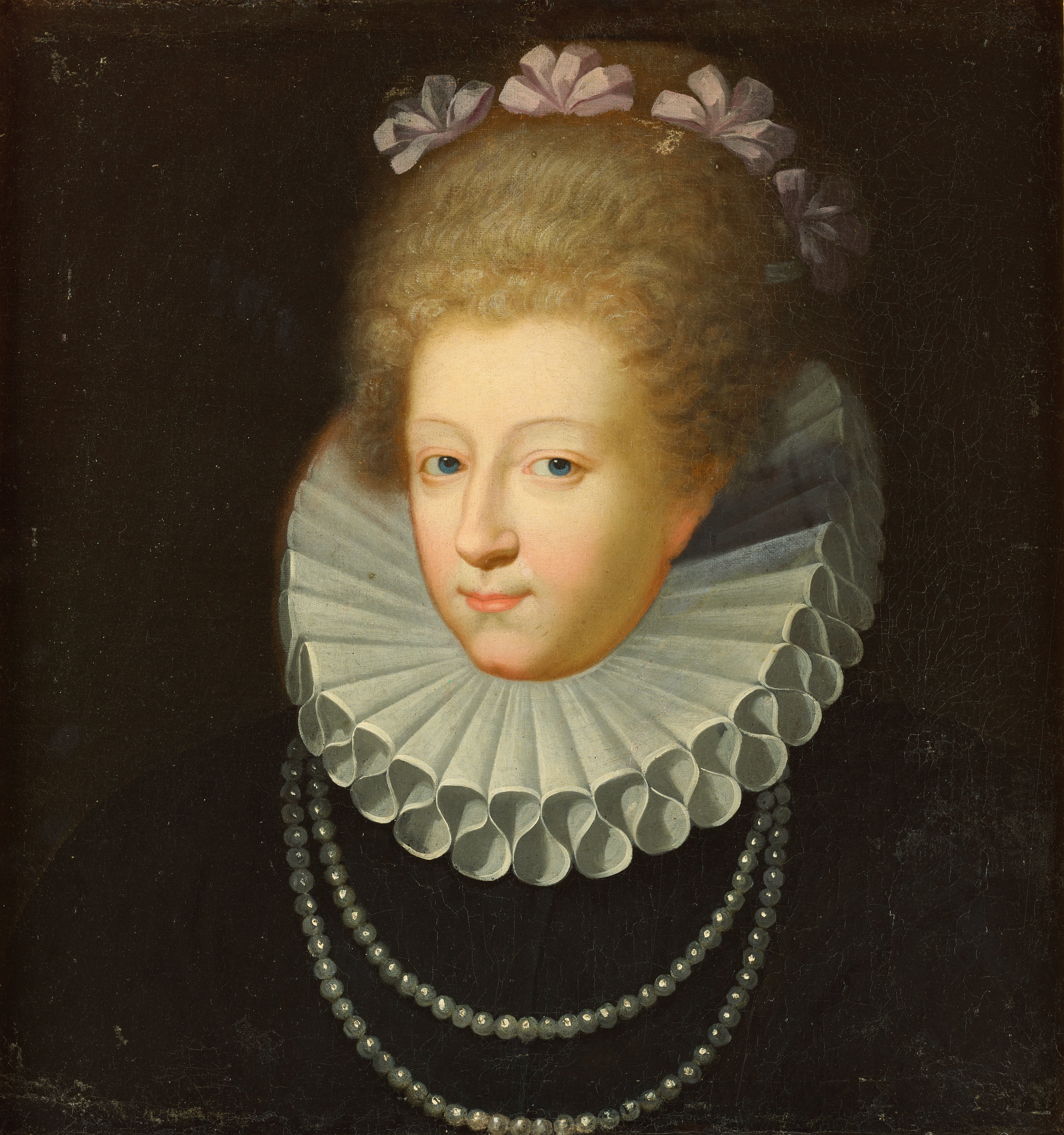
Gabrielle d'Estrées

- 10 April – Gabrielle d'Estrées, mistress, confidante and adviser of Henry IV of France (b. 1573)

=== Full date missing ===
- Antoine Caron, glassmaker, painter and illustrator (b. 1521)
- Philippe Hurault de Cheverny, nobleman and politician (b. 1528)
