= Pierre Barrière =

Attempted assassin of King Henry IV of France (died 1593)

Pierre Barrière (died 31 August 1593) was a would-be assassin of King Henry IV of France.

Barrière attempted an assassination of Henry IV on 27 August 1593. His assassination attempt failed when he was denounced by a Dominican priest to whom he had confessed. He was executed on 31 August 1593 by breaking on the wheel and dismemberment.
