= Jeanette Abadie =

Jeanette Abadie (or l'Abadie; born c. 1593) was a young woman of the village of Ciboure in Labourd, France, who was supposedly lured into witchcraft and was one of the principal witnesses concerning the supposed practices of the witches' Sabbath. Her account of the Sabbath was contained in the narrative of Pierre de Lancre, a royal councillor of Bordeaux, who made an exhaustive study of witchcraft after being appointed in 1609 to a commission to try people accused of it, apparently including the then sixteen-year-old Jeanette.

== Description of witches' sabbaths ==
Jeanette claimed to have been approached by a woman named Gratianne and taken to the witches' Sabbath, presided over by the Devil himself. In return, Gratianne had received a handful of gold. Jeanette said that the Devil took the form of a hideous black-skinned man with either six or eight horns on his head, a great tail, and two faces, one in front and one behind, similar to the depiction of the Roman god Janus. At her first Sabbath, she was required to renounce God, the Virgin Mary, her baptism, family, heaven, earth, and all worldly things, and was also required to kiss the Devil on the buttocks. Every time she went to the Sabbath she had to repeat this renunciation and often also had to kiss the Devil's buttocks, and frequently also his face, navel and penis. There was much dancing at these sabbaths, usually naked. The Devil frequently joined in, taking the best-looking man or woman as his partner.

Another ceremony Jeanette described was the baptising of toads. These creatures were important in the ceremonies and at one Sabbath a woman danced with four toads perched on her body, one on each shoulder and one on each wrist. Tables at the Sabbath were piled with food, but on eating it proved to be either insubstantial or to taste disgusting.

There was considerable sexual activity at the Sabbaths, much of it incestuous. Jeanette claimed to have lost her own virginity to the Devil at the age of thirteen (the usual age, she said, was twelve), and to have also had sexual intercourse with numerous others, including her first cousin (then considered incestuous). Intercourse with the Devil, she said, was very painful, since his penis was a yard long and scaly, and his semen icy cold. No intercourse at the Sabbath ever led to pregnancy. She described these sexual acts with what seemed like great pleasure and in minute detail.

At the ceremonies there were also a number of little demons without arms who kindled a great fire, into which they threw the witches, who emerged unharmed. The grand master of the witches once threw himself in and was burned to a powder, which was then used by the other witches to enchant children and make them go willingly to the Sabbath. She also saw well-known priests, some of whom she named, celebrating mass at the Sabbaths, with the demons taking the place of saints on the altar. Sometimes the Devil pierced one of the celebrants under the little toe and sucked his blood, whereupon the individual could never again make confession. Jeanette named a priest called François de Bideguaray as one of these. She also named many other witches.

== Jeanette's escape ==
Jeanette said, however, that she had made up her mind to escape the witches. For the last nine months she had tried to avoid being taken back and had sat up on the nights of the Sabbath. However, for the first three months the Devil had carried her away by day instead. For the next six months she spent the Sabbath in church, where the Devil could not reach her, and was only tricked into going with him twice. The last occasion was on 13 September 1609. She had sat up in the village church all Saturday night and at daybreak had gone home and fallen asleep. During high mass the Devil came to her, snatched off the protective amulet she wore around her neck (a higo, or piece of leather in the form of a hand, with the fist closed and the thumb passed between the first two fingers), and carried her off to the Sabbath.

That was the last time she went to the Sabbath, claimed Jeanette. She was lucky – the judges believed her story that she had been coerced and had desperately tried to escape, and by confessing her sins and renouncing witchcraft she was spared execution.
