= Jacques de Serisay =

French poet, founding director of the Académie Française

Jacques de Serisay (1594 – November 1653) was a French poet, intendant of the duc de La Rochefoucauld, and the founding director of the Académie française.

He was born in Paris, and was director of the Académie from 1634 to 11 January 1638, as well as being the first occupant of seat three. Only a few of his poems are extant. He died in La Rochefoucauld, Charente.
