= Simon Vigor =

French Catholic bishop and controversialist

Simon Vigor (b. at Evreux, Normandy, about 1515; d. at Carcassonne, 1 November 1575) was a French Catholic bishop and controversialist.

== Life ==
Son of Raynaud Vigor, a court physician, he went to Paris about 1520, where his studies included Greek, Hebrew, and Latin; later he devoted himself to theology. Admitted to the College of Navarre in 1540, in the same year he became rector of the University of Paris. In 1545 he became a doctor of theology and was appointed penitentiary of Evreux. Thenceforth he devoted himself to pastoral and controversial preaching, with great success.

He was called upon to speak at Rouen, Paris, Metz, and elsewhere. When conferences took place at Saint-Germain near Paris (1562) between the Catholics and the Calvinists, defended by Theodore Beza and others, Vigor was one of those chosen to defend the Catholic cause in the name of the Sorbonne. In 1563 he was among the twelve theologians representing the Sorbonne at the Council of Trent, where he took part in the discussions on clandestine marriages and indulgences. He was instrumental in cementing amicable relations between Cardinal Hosius of Warsaw, papal legate to the council, and Francisco Torres (Turrianus), and won the confidence of Charles, Cardinal of Lorraine whom he accompanied on his visit (February 1563) to the Emperor Ferdinand I at Innsbruck.

On his return to France, Vigor became pastor of the Church of St. Paul-de-Paris, the royal parish, theologian of the chapter of Notre-Dame de Paris, and court preacher. He preached against the Protestants with an ardour which drew on him for some of his propositions (March, 1564) if not the censure, at least the displeasure, of the Sorbonne. He converted several of them, among others Pierre Pithou.

After preaching at Lent at Amiens, he stated that at his arrival he had found there more than 800 heretics and at his departure there remained only forty. In 1566 he held, together with Claude de Sainctes, against the Calvinist ministers Jean de l'Epine and Sureau de Rosier, a conference of which the acts were printed (Paris, 1582). According to Génébrard the defeat of the ministers was so overwhelming that the subsequent Calvinist synod forbade conferences to be held thenceforth with Catholics.

These successes had made Vigor famous when in 1572 Pope Gregory XIII raised him to the See of Narbonne. After his consecration he went to his diocese, long without a resident bishop. He never returned to Paris or to his home, being wholly engaged in converting the Protestants of his own and the neighbouring dioceses, in which work death overtook him.

After his death the Bishop of Rennes in a letter to Gregory XIII called him the Athanasius or Hilary of his time, and Duval praised him as a model of learning and piety, a pillar of the Roman Church.

== Works ==
There were edited after his death five volumes of his Sermons ou prédications chrétiennes et catholiques (Paris, 1577–88); several times reprinted.
