= Jacques Cousinot =

French Physician

Jacques Cousinot, also known as Jacobi Cusinoti, (born 1585 in Paris; died on 25 June 1646 in Paris) was the King's First Physician at the beginning of the reign of Louis XIV.

== Biography ==
=== Family and studies ===
His father, who was also named Jacques Cousinot, was dean of the Faculty of Medicine in Paris. The younger Cousinot received a bachelor's degree in 1616, he obtained his license and his doctor's degree in 1618. In the same year, he was appointed district doctor by Louis XIII. In 1623, he was appointed by letters patent to the chair of surgery at the Collège de France, succeeding René Chartier, who had resigned.

=== First Physician to the King ===
Charles Bouvard, first physician to the king, also a professor at the Royal College, gave him his daughter in marriage and had him appointed first physician to the Dauphin in 1638, then in 1643 first physician to Louis XIV. Cousinot also succeeded Charles Bouvard that year as Superintendent of the King's Garden.

He wrote of several medical pamphlets in Latin, Jacques Cousinot also published in 1631 a Speech to the King concerning the nature, virtues, effects and use of Forges mineral water.
