= Esther Imbert =

French noblewoman

Esther Imbert (1570-1593), was a French noblewoman. She was the mistress of Henry IV of France in 1586–1588. She had a child with the king, Gideon (1588-1589). She was accepted by Diane d'Andoins as a mistress of secondary rank.
