= Barbara of Salm =

Barbara of Salm (French: Barbe de Salm; 1570–1611) was a German-Roman monarch as Princess Abbess of the Imperial Remiremont Abbey in France.

She was chosen by her predecessor as Coadjutrice in 1579 after pressure from the Duke of Lorraine. When she succeeded to the position in 1580, she was questioned by the canonesses, who elected Huberte de Chastenay instead. The pope, however, ruled in favor of Barbara, who managed to build up a good relationship with the members of the chapter.
