= Florimond de Raemond =

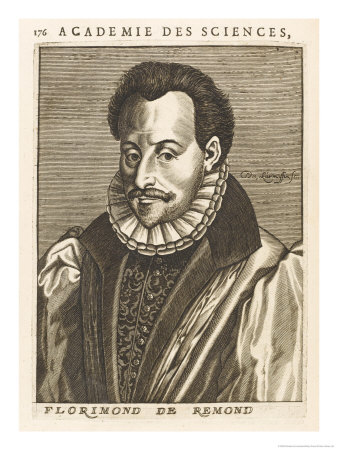
Florimond de Raemond 3^{ème} seigneur de Suquet, seigneur de La Combe et de La Rivallerie, sieur des Cheminées, as a contemporary engraving

Florimond de Raemond (1540– 17 November 1601) was a French jurist and antiquary. He is now known for a multi-volume history of recent events in France, written from a Roman Catholic point of view, and other popular works promoting the Counter-Reformation perspective against Protestant arguments. De Raemond was born in Agen and died in Bordeaux.

== Life ==
His father was Robert I^{er} de Raymond, 2^{ème} seigneur de Suquet (died in 1605) and his mother, née Marie de Saint-Gilis. De Raemond was a pupil of Petrus Ramus and a Protestant convert, but later reverted to Catholicism. He was a friend of Montaigne and Blaise de Monluc.

== Works ==
He published a popular work on Pope Joan in 1587, L'Erreur populaire de la papesse Jeanne, in which he argued, following Onofrio Panvinio, that the story was a myth, and the references in the chronicle of Martinus Polonus were later interpolations. In 1597 his L'Anti-Christ was an exposition in French of the Catholic arguments against the Pope as Antichrist, following Robert Bellarmine and Nicholas Sanders at an accessible level. The primacy of the apostle Peter over the other eleven was referred to Tertullian; the Primacy of Simon Peter is a basic Catholic argument for Papal Primacy. The work is a bitter polemic against Protestants, and defends the role of the Papacy in the Church. His Histoire attributed the impact in France of the Protestant Reformation to Marguerite de Navarre and Gérard Roussel. It appeared posthumously in 1605, in eight books, of which the sixth has been attributed to his son François.
