= Bucherius =

Gilles Bouchier or Boucher, Latinized Aegidius Bucherius or Bucherus (1576–1665) was a Jesuit historian and chronologist from the Low Countries.

Bucherius was born in Arras, then part of the Spanish Netherlands. His Doctrina Temporum (1634) published for the first time some important chronological documents, in particular the Chronography of 354, and work on computation of the date of Easter (the cycle of Victorius of Aquitaine). He also published Anatolius Laodicensis and Hippolytus Romanus.

Originally at Béthune, he moved to Liège, where for six years he was Rector of the Jesuit College. He died in Tournai.

== Works ==
- De doctrina temporum commentarius in Victorium Aquitanum (Antwerp, 1634)
- Belgium Romanum ecclesiasticum et civile (Liège, 1655)
