= Claude de Sainctes =

French Catholic theologist, author and controversialist

Claude de Sainctes (b. at Perche, 1525; d. at Crèvecoeur, 1591) was a French Catholic theologist, author, and controversialist.

== Biography ==
At the age of fifteen he joined the Canons Regular of Saint-Cheron, and was sent to the College of Navarre in Paris, where he received the degree of Doctor of Theology (1555). On account of the erudition of his early works and the aptitude which he showed for controversy, he was called to the Conference of Poissy, held in 1561 between the Catholics and the Huguenots, at which Theodore of Beza and Diego Lainez, Superior General of the Society of Jesus, were present.

He was afterwards deputed to the Council of Trent to represent, with Simon Vigor, the University of Paris. Upon his return, he acquired a reputation for his sermons and discussions with Protestants. He published a work against their spoliation of Catholic churches and a vigorous declaration against the doctrines of John Calvin and Theodore of Beza; the latter replied and drew upon himself a new attack from Claude de Sainctes.

At the same time he charged the King of France by his treatise on "L'ancien naturel des Français" never to tolerate heretics; against these, he later defended Catholic dogma with an exhaustive treatise on the Eucharist. Through the patronage of Charles, Cardinal of Lorraine, he was appointed to the Bishopric of Évreux(1575).

He was very zealous in his efforts to convert Protestants. He assisted at the provincial Council of Rouen (1581) and published its records in French. When the League became active he took sides with it and worked to gain partisans, but the royal troops took possession of Évreux and the bishop was forced to flee. Unfortunately for him, there were found among his papers writings in which he approved of the murder of Henry III of France, and maintained that one could likewise kill his successor.

Arrested and arraigned before the Parlement of Caen, he was condemned to death as guilty of high treason. At the request of the Cardinal de Bourbon and of several bishops, Henry IV commuted his sentence to life imprisonment, and he was confined in the château of Crèvecoeur where he died two months later.

== Important works ==
His works were published, some in Latin and others in French. The more important are:

- "Liturgiae sive missae SS. Patrum Jacobi, Basilii J. Chrysostomi" (Greek-Latin, Paris, 1560)
- "Discours sur le saccagement des églises catholiques par les hérétiques anciens et nouveaux calvinistes" (Paris, 1562)
  - Translated into Dutch as Discours oft corte enarratie, op die beroovinghe der catholycker kercken gheschiet door die oude ketteren, ende nieuwe Calvinisten van onsen tyden (Leuven, Rutger Velpius, 1567) Available on Google Books
- "Traité de l'ancien naturel des Français en la religion chrétienne" (Paris, 1567)
- "Déclaration d'anciens athéismes de la doctrine de Calvin et de Bèze contre les premiers fondements de la chrétienté" (Paris, 1567)
- "De rebus Eucharistiae controversis libri X" (Paris, 1575).
