= Pierre de Saint-Joseph =

French philosopher

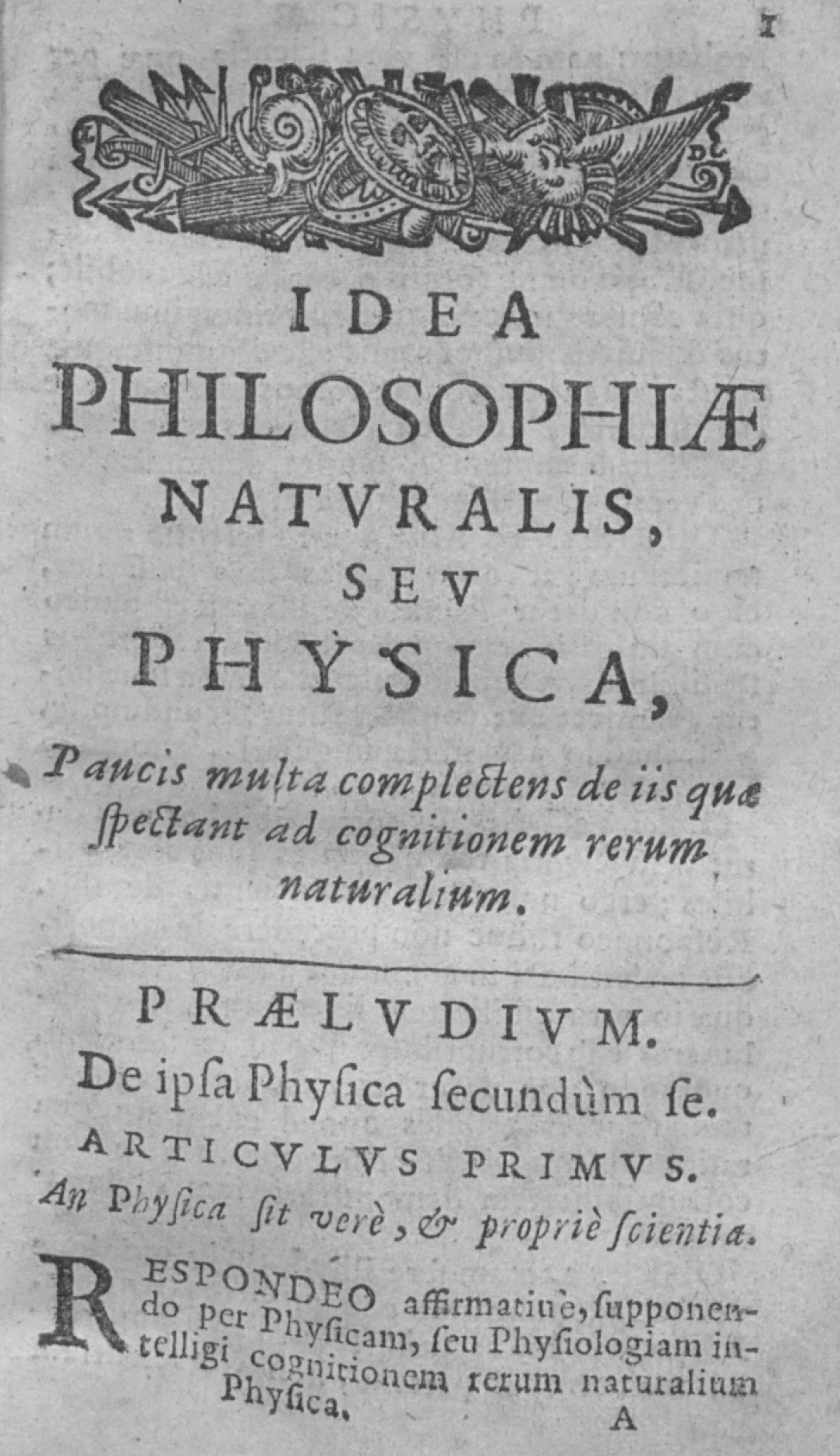
Title page of the 1659 Idea philosophiae naturalis, seu physica

Pierre de Saint-Joseph (born Pierre Comagère; Latin: Petrus A Sancto Josepho; 1594 – 1662), was a French Cistercian monk, philosopher, and theologian.

== Works ==
- Defensio s. Thomae Aquinatis (in Latin). Lyon: Vincent de Coeursilly. 1633.
- Idea theologiae speculativae (in Latin). Cologne: Konstantin Münich. 1640.
- Idea theologiae moralis (in Latin). Paris: Georges Josse. 1645.
- Theses universae theologiae (in Latin). Cologne: Konstantin Münich. 1648.
- Idea philosophiae rationalis, seu logica (in Latin). Paris: Georges Josse. 1654.
- Idea philosophiae naturalis, seu physica (in Latin). Paris: Georges Josse. 1659.
- Summula casuum conscientiae (in Latin). Lyon: Antoine Beaujolin & Michel Goy. 1666.
- Les sentimens de Saint François de Sales (in French). Paris: F. Muguet. 1669.
- Idea philosophiae universalis, seu metaphysica (in Latin). Cologne: Konstantin Münich. 1671.
