= Jean Sirmond =

French neo-Latin poet

Jean Sirmond (1589, Riom, France – 1649, Riom, France) was a French neo-Latin poet and man of letters, historiographer of Louis XIII.

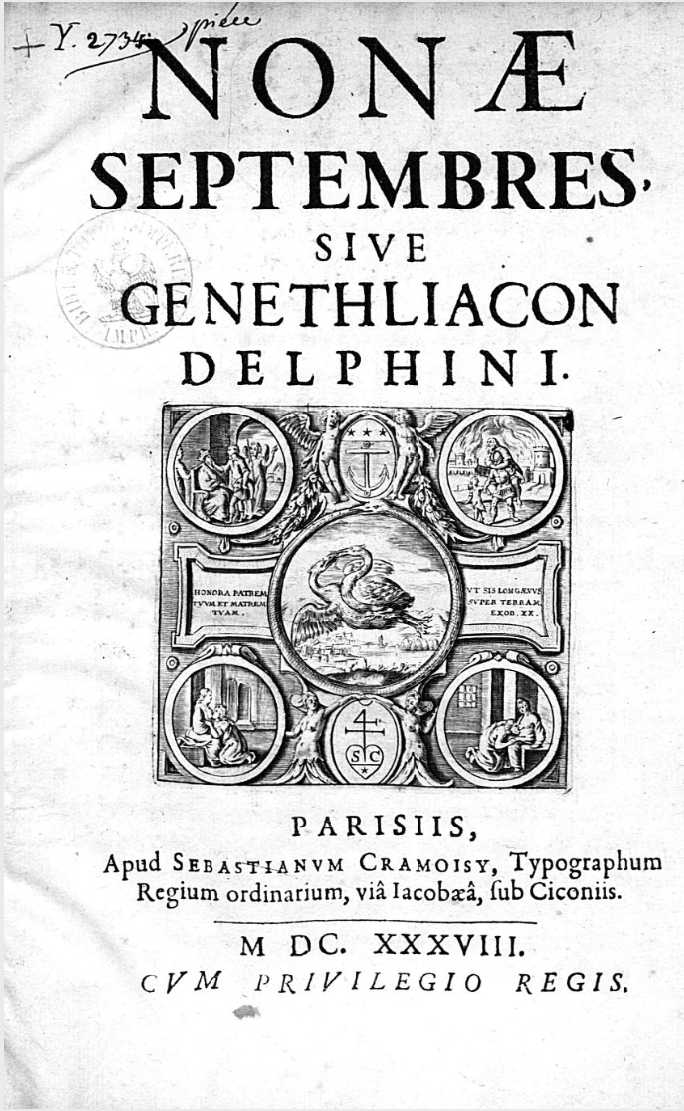

== Biography ==
Sirmond is known especially for his lifelong feud with Mathieu de Morgues, known as the lord of Saint-Germain, who favored Marie de Médicis and was against Cardinal Richelieu. Jean Sirmond answered it with a series of small works which he writes under various pseudonyms, such as Julius Pomponius Dolabella, the faithful French or Sieur of the Mountains.

He is nephew of P. Sirmond Jésuite, Confessor of King Louis XIII, & one of the wiser men of our century. He came to the Court, & by the favour of the Cardinal of Richelieu, which he estimated one of the best writers then, he was made Historiographer of the King...

At the time of his stay in Paris, Sirmond collaborated in the drafting of the statutes of the l'Académie française, of which he became one of the first members in 1634. He also authored a Life of the Cardinal of Amboise, published in 1631, and wrote Latin poems, published posthumously in 1653. After the death of the king and the cardinal, he withdrew to his native Auvergne, finding himself without support after having fought so much.

Paul Pellisson paid Sirmond a personal homage, which also constitutes a testimony on the evolution of the French language, which some said was now sufficiently "reasonable" to be worthy to replace Latin and the Greek as the erudite and literary language of the day. Pellison writes:

J'ajoûterai ici par une espèce de reconnaissance, qu'un de ses ouvrages est une des premières choses, qui m'ont donné goût pour notre Langue. J'étois fraîchement sorti du Collège : on me présentoit je ne sais combien de Romans, & d'autres pièces nouvelles, dont tout jeune, & tout enfant que j'étois, je ne laissois pas de me mocquer, revenant toûjours à mon Cicéron, & à mon Térence, que je trouvois bien plus raisonnables. Enfin, il me tomba presque en même temps quatre livres [de Jean Sirmond] entre les mains [...]. Dès-lors, je commençai non-seulement à ne plus mépriser la Langue Françoise; mais encore à l'aimer passionnément, à l'étudier avec quelque soin, & à croire, comme je fais encore aujourd'hui, qu'avec du génie, du temps, & du travail, on pouvoit la rendre capable de toutes choses.

== Writings ==
- Les Bons et Vrays Advis du François fidelle. Aux Mal-contans retirez de la Cour
- La Pitarchie française ou réponse aux vaines plaintes des malcontens (1615)
- Discours au Roy sur l'excellence de ses vertus incomparables et de ses actions héroïques (1624)
- Astraea redux. Ad illustrissimum virum, Stephanum Haligrum, Galliae cancellarium (1624)
- Illustrissimi Francisci cardinalis Barberini legatio Gallica (1625)
- La Lettre déchiffrée (1627). Éloge de Richelieu.
- Advertissement aux provinces sur les nouveaux mouvemens du royaume (1631)
- La Vie du Cardinal d'Amboise, en suite de laquelle sont traictez quelques poincts sur les affaires présentes (1631)
- Le Coup d'estat de Louys XIII (1631)
- La Défense du roi et de ses ministres contre le manifeste que sous le nom de Monsieur on fait courre parmi le peuple (1631)
- L'Homme du pape et du roy, ou Réparties véritables sur les imputations calomnieuses d'un libelle diffamatoire semé contre sa Sainteté et sa Majesté très-chrestienne (1634)
- Ioannis Sirmondi De eloquentissimo principe, sylua (1635)
- Advis du Francois fidelle: aux mal-contents nouvellement retirez de la Cour (1637)
- Le Souhait du Cid en faveur de Scudéri : une paire de lunettes pour faire mieux ses observations (1637). Documents sur la querelle du Cid.
- La Chimère deffaicte, ou Réfutation d'un libelle séditieux tendant à troubler l'Estat, sous pretexte d'y prévenir un schisme (1640)
- Chimæra excisa, siue confutatio libelli seditiosi, cuius autor vt schisma politicum excitet in Gallia, ecclesiasticum ab ea se fingit auertere (1641)
