= François Dubois =

16th-century French painter

François Dubois (French pronunciation: [fʁɑ̃swa dybwa]; c. 1529 – 24 August 1584) was a French Huguenot painter of the Fontainebleau School.

== Biography ==
Dubois was born around 1529 in Amiens, in the province of Picardy. He was likely related to the anatomist Jacques Dubois.

Dubois fled France following the St. Bartholomew's Day massacre in 1572, when Catholic mobs killed about 3,000 Protestants (Huguenots) in Paris. It is not known whether he witnessed the event but a possible relative, the surgeon Antoine Dubois, died in the slaughter. He settled in Geneva in the Protestant Republic of Geneva, where he died on 24 August 1584.

== Works ==
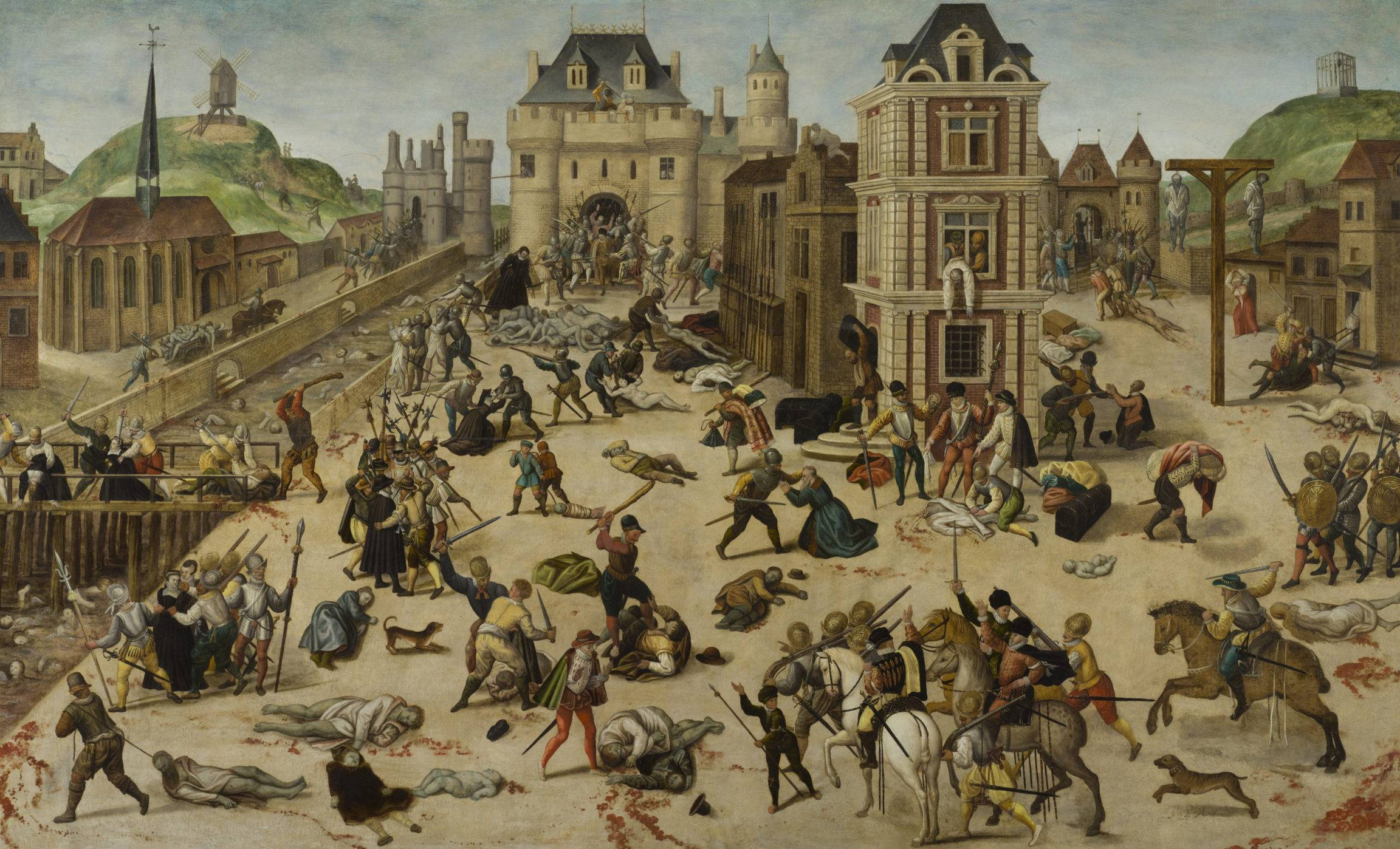
The Saint Bartholomew's Day Massacre by François Dubois. Oil on panel, 94 × 154 cm; Cantonal Museum of Lausanne.

His only surviving work is the best-known depiction of the St. Bartholomew's Day massacre. A fellow Huguenot refugee, a banker from Lyon, commissioned the painting to commemorate the event. The painting shows two incidents from the massacre frequently seen in other depictions in popular prints and book illustrations: the body of Huguenot leader Gaspard de Coligny hangs out of a window at the rear to the right, and is also depicted decapitated on the ground under the window, with the Duke of Guise standing behind it. To the left rear, Catherine de' Medici, emerges from the Louvre Palace and inspects a heap of bodies.

Dubois is also known to have painted a picture of the Roman Triumvirate.

== Sources ==
- Martin Schieder, Die göttliche Ordnung der Geschichte. Massaker und Martyrium im Gemälde »La Saint-Barthélemy« von François Dubois, ib: Uwe Fleckner (ed.): Bilder machen Geschichte. Historische Ereignisse im Gedächtnis der Kunst, Berlin 2014, pp. 127–140 (Studien aus dem Warburg-Haus, Bd. 13).
