= Adrienne d'Heur =

Alleged French witch (1585-1646)

Adrienne d’Heur'
- Born: 1585
- Died: 1646; France

Adrienne d’Heur (1585 – 11 September 1646) was an alleged French witch.

Adrienne d'Heur was the widow of goldsmith Pierre Bacqueson of Montbéliard. Unlike many people accused of sorcery in France, she was described as intelligent and well-educated. She was arrested by the French Inquisition. By torture, she was encouraged to confess having made a pact with the Devil. Despite hours of torture, she refused to confess. She was accused of having murdered her husband, caused the death of a horse, of the abduction of children and numerous other charges. During examination, they found a mark on her body which was decided to be the Devil's mark. She was judged guilty and executed by burning.
