= Jean Ballesdens =

French lawyer, editor and bibliophile

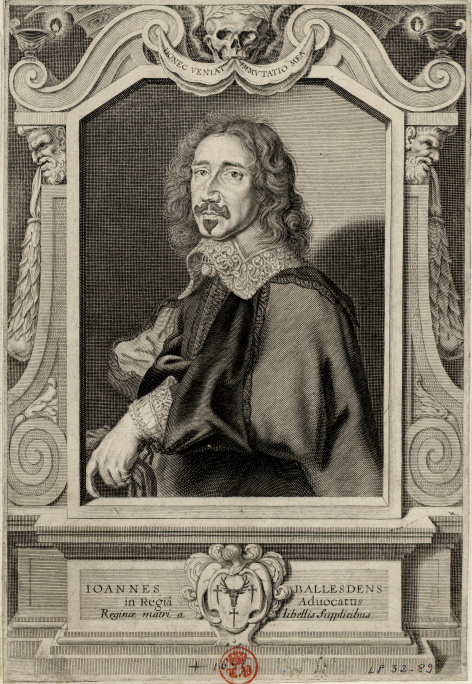
Jean Ballesdens

Jean Ballesdens (1595 in Paris – 1675 in Paris) was a French lawyer, editor, and bibliophile, though he has left practically no writings. He is the first known collector of books with historic bindings.

== Biography ==
A lawyer to the parlement de Paris and secretary to chancellor Séguier, he was elected to the Académie française in 1648 - though he had renounced a place when it was first offered him, in favour of Pierre Corneille. He collected books and formed a library that was the rival of his master's in terms of numbers, choice and the editions' beauty. Notable books from it were the nine volumes in Grolier bindings.
