= Antonio Mizauld =

French astronomer and physician (1510–1578)

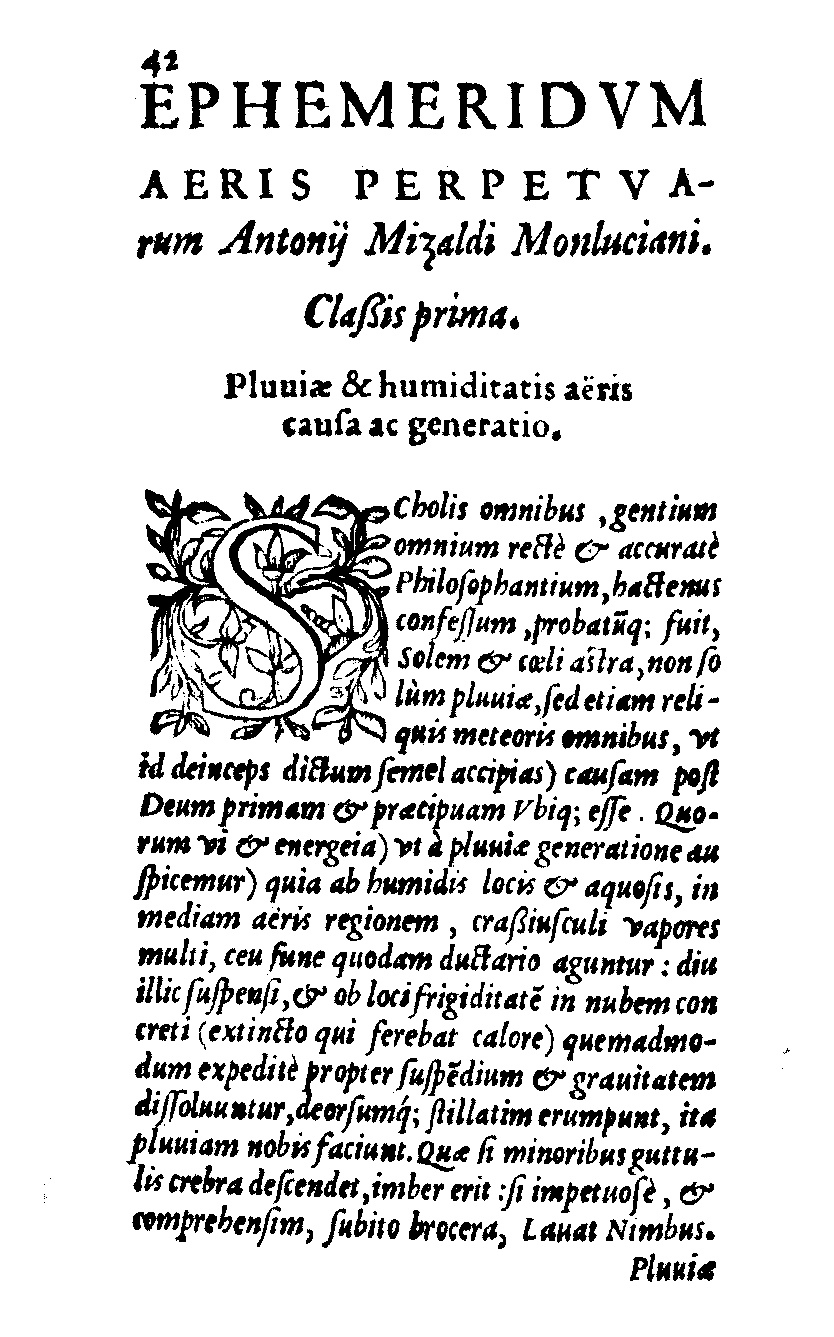
Ephemerides aeris perpetuae, 1560

Antoine Mizauld, known in Latin as Antonius Mizaldus (born in Montluçon in 1510 and died in Paris in 1578) was a French astronomer and physician.

== Biography ==
A doctor and professor of medicine in Paris, and a close friend of Oronce Fine, he acted as astrologer and physician to Marguerite de Valois.

His first published work, a treatise on weather prediction, appeared in 1546. He was a prolific author, writing about comets, gardens, herbs, medicine and astronomy. He published a variety of tracts on medical, astronomical, botanical and meteorological subjects. Mizauld is best known for his treatises on medicine and astrology, Secrets of the Moon (1571), and Harmonia Coelestium Corporum & Humanorum (1555). Harmonia Superioris is rooted in Renaissance discourse on the relationship between macrocosm and microcosm.

He devoted most of his research to the study of natural curiosities. In these two books, he brings together the essence of his knowledge of horticulture, in particular the cultivation and care of fruit trees. He devoted himself entirely to the publication of unusual treatises, including several on gardening, medicinal plants and popular pharmacy.

He tried to make medicine accessible to all, and to free poor patients from the notorious rapacity of apothecaries.

In several of his books, he claims to show that, in many cases, one have to look far and wide for remedies that they can pick from their own garden!

According to Gérard Oberlé,

"Mizault's works deserve to be researched today, when health manuals are resurfacing, concocted by distant epigones of the Bourbonnais scientist, unemployed singers, leek magicians and other natural healers".

== Works ==
- Mizauld, Antoine (1553). Planetae, sive Planetarum collegium (in Latin). Charlotte Guillard.
- Mizauld, Antoine (1560). Ephemerides aeris perpetuae (in Latin). Jean Bellère.
- Mizauld, Antoine (1560). De hortensium arborum insitione (in Latin). Paris: Fédéric Morel (1.).
- Mizauld, Antoine. Orontii vita (in Latin).
- Mizauld, Antoine (1562). Singuliers secrets et secours contre la peste, souventesfois experimentez et approuvez, tant en certaine preservation que parfaicte guarison [Singular secrets and help against the plague, often experienced and approved, both in certain preservation and perfect healing] (in French). Paris: M. Breuille.
- Mizauld, Antoine (1572). Opusculum de sena, planta inter omnes, quotquot sunt, hominibus beneficentissima et saluberrima [Treaty of the senna, of all plants, the most useful for human health] (in Latin). Paris: Frédéric Morel..

== Bibliography ==
- R. P. Niceron, « Antoine Mizauld », in Mémoires pour servir à l'histoire des hommes illustres dans la république des lettres, Paris, 1739, t. 40, p. 201-213.
- William Eamon, Science and the Secrets of Nature, Princeton University Press, 1994, p. 274.
- Jean Dupèbe, Médecine, astrologie et religion à Paris : Antoine Mizauld (ca. 1512-1578), thèse d’état, Paris-X Nanterre, 1999.
- Hiro Hirai, "Lecture néoplatonicienne d’Hippocrate chez Fernel, Cardan et Gemma", in Pratique et pensée médicales à la Renaissance, éd. Jacqueline Vons, Paris, De Boccard, 2009, p. 241-256.
- Maurice Malleret, Encyclopédie des auteurs du pays montluçonnais et de leurs œuvres (de 1440 à 1994), Charroux, Éd. des Cahiers bourbonnais, 1994, p. 29-34 (notice no 3).
- Maurice Sarazin, Les Bourbonnais célèbres et remarquables des origines à la fin du XXe siècle, tome III : Arrondissement de Montluçon, Charroux, Éditions des Cahiers bourbonnais, 2014, p. 236-237.
