= Jean Raymond Merlin =

French protestant theologian

Jean Raymond Merlin (surnamed Monroy, c. 1510 – c. 1578) was a French Protestant theologian.

== Biography ==
Jean Raymond Merlin was born at Romans-sur-Isère, France, about 1510. He was a professor of Hebrew at Lausanne, probably from 1537 to 1558, when he resigned his position in order the better to protest against the removal from office of two of his colleagues, Pierre Viret and Jacob Valier, by act of the Bernese government. He afterwards retired to Geneva, where he was pastor for three years. Called to Paris in 1561, at the instance of Coligny, he was intrusted with a mission to La Rochelle, and attended the Colloquy of Poissy, where he took, however, only a secondary part. Jeanne d'Albret then invited him to visit the Béarn, and engaged him to propagate the doctrines of the Reformation. He returned to Geneva about the middle of 1564. Shortly thereafter he came in conflict with the civil authorities, and, because of his decided opposition to civil interference in ecclesiastical affairs, was removed. Merlin then went into the Dauphiné, from which the massacre of St. Bartholomew drove him away. He sought refuge in Geneva. He died about 1578.

== Works ==
Merlin wrote a French translation entitled Commentaires d'Œcolampade sur Job et Daniel (Geneva, 1561, 8vo). He also published Catéchisme extrait de celuy de Genève, pour examiner ceux qu'on veut recevoir à la Cène, avec la translation en langue bernoise (Limoges, s. d.); Les dix Commandements de la loi de Dieu, translates d'Hébreu en Français, et exposés avec six autres translations (Geneva, 1561).

== Bibliographie ==
- This article incorporates public domain material from McClintock, John; Strong, James (1867–1887). Cyclopædia of Biblical, Theological and Ecclesiastical Literature. Harper and Brothers.
- Kingdon, Robert (1967). Geneva and the Consolidation of the French Protestant Movement 1564-1572. Madison: University of Wisconsin Press.
