= 1663 in France =

- Decades: 1640s; 1650s; 1660s; 1670s; 1680s
- See also: History of France; Timeline of French history; List of years in France

Events from the year 1663 in France.

== Incumbents ==
- Monarch – Louis XIV

== Events ==
- The Académie des Inscriptions et Belles-Lettres is founded
- Construction of the Church of Saint-Just, Lyon is completed
- The Prix de Rome scholarship is established for students of the arts

== Births ==
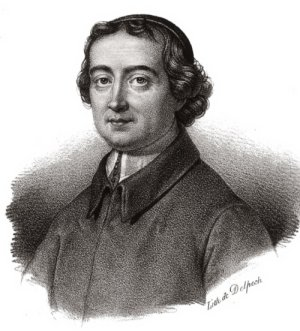
Jean Baptiste Massillon

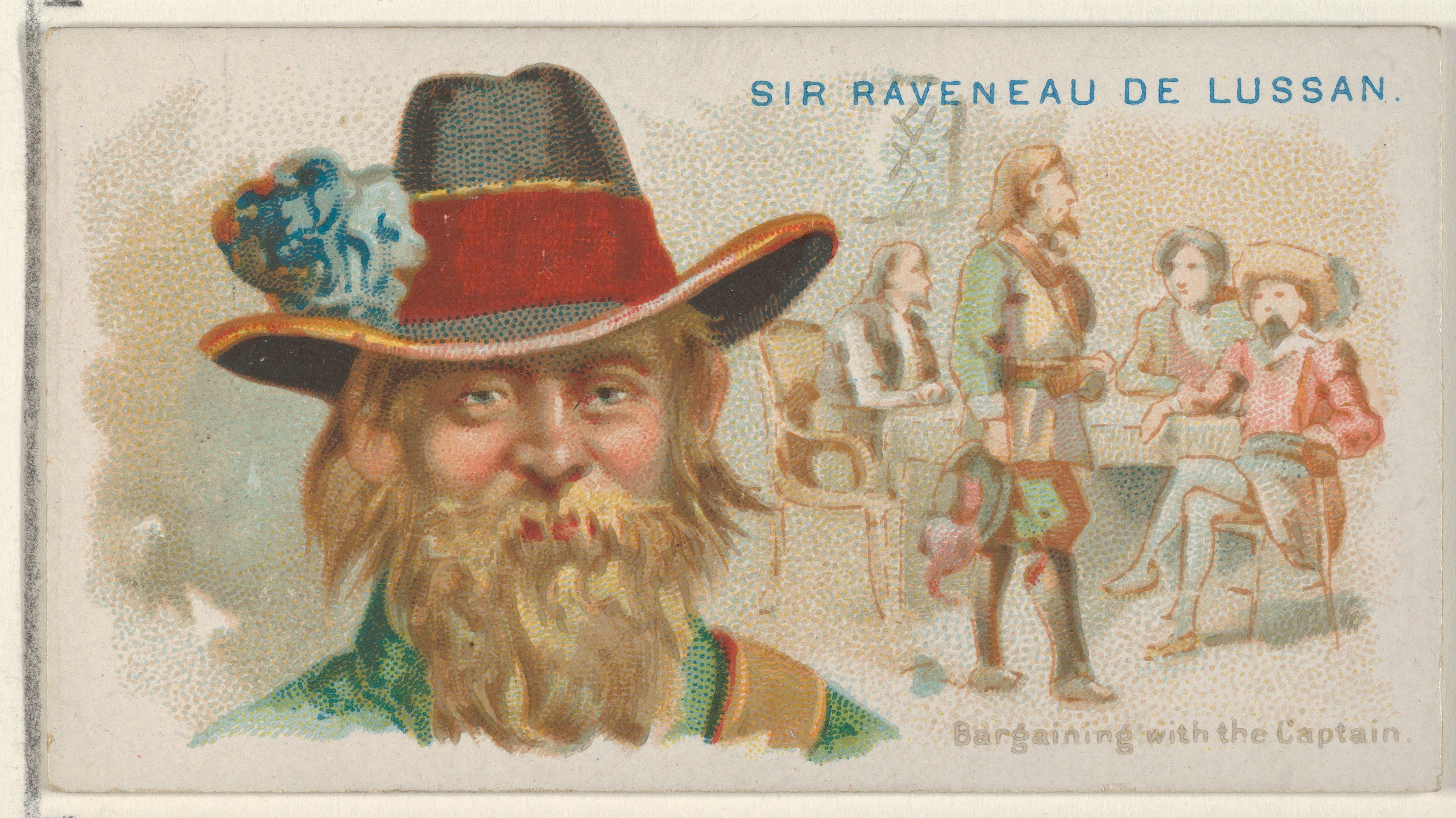
Raveneau de Lussan

- 16 March – Jean-Baptiste Matho, composer (d 1743)
- 25 March – Félix Le Pelletier de La Houssaye, statesman (d. 1723)
- 2 June – Anne-Marguerite Petit du Noyer, journalist (d. 1719)
- 24 June – Jean Baptiste Massillon, Roman Catholic bishop and famous preacher (d. 1742)
- 26 July – Louis Carré, mathematician (d. 1711)
- 5 August – Charles-Armand de Gontaut, duc de Biron, military leader (d. 1756)
- 31 August – Guillaume Amontons, scientific instrument inventor and physicist (d. 1705)
- 1 September – Jean Boivin the Younger, writer, scholar and translator (d. 1726)
- 20 September – Louis-François Duplessis de Mornay, prelate (d. 1741)
- 18 October – Prince Eugene of Savoy, military commander (d. 1736)
- 14 December – Jean de Forcade de Biaix (d. 1729)

=== Full date unknown ===
- Jacques Adam, translator (d. 1735)
- Louis Deseschaliers, actor
- Jean-Baptiste Labat, clergyman, botanist, writer, explorer, ethnographer, soldier, engineer and landowner (d. 1738)
- Louis Laguerre, painter (d. 1721)
- Louis Le Pelletier, linguist (d. 1733)
- Raveneau de Lussan, buccaneer
- Pierre-Denis Martin, painter (d. 1742)

== Deaths ==
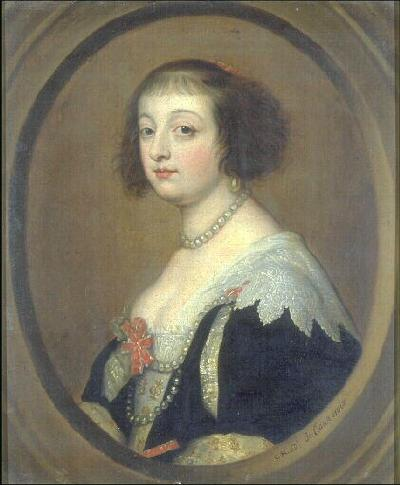
Béatrix de Cusance

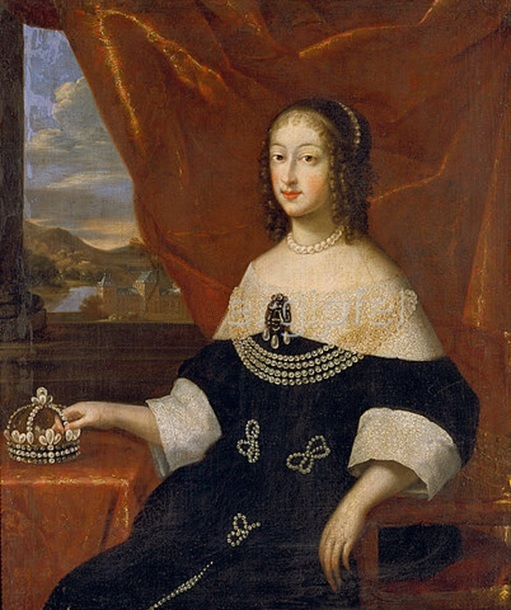
Christine of France

- 11 may – Henri II d'Orléans, Duke of Longueville (b. 1595)
- 5 June – Béatrix de Cusance, baroness (b. 1614)
- 20 June – Catherine Henriette de Bourbon, Légitimée de France, Duchess of Elbeuf (b. 1596)
- 31 October – Théophile Raynaud, Jesuit theologian and writer (b. 1583)
- 27 December – Christine of France, Duchess of Savoy (b. 1606)

=== Full date unknown ===
- Gauthier de Costes, seigneur de la Calprenède, novelist and dramatist (b. 1609 or 1610)
- Claude de Bourdeille, comte de Montrésor, aristocrat and Count of Montrésor (born c. 1606)
