= 1666 in France =

- Decades: 1640s; 1650s; 1660s; 1670s; 1680s
- See also: History of France; Timeline of French history; List of years in France

Events from the year 1666 in France.

== Incumbents ==
- Monarch – Louis XIV

== Events ==
- 13 January – French traveller Jean-Baptiste Tavernier arrives in Dhaka, and meets Shaista Khan.
- 4 June – Molière's comedy The Misanthrope is premièred at the Théâtre du Palais-Royal in Paris, by the King's Players.
- 22 December – The French Academy of Sciences, founded by the king, first meets.
- The Institution libre du Sacré-Cœur at Tourcoing is founded.

== Births ==
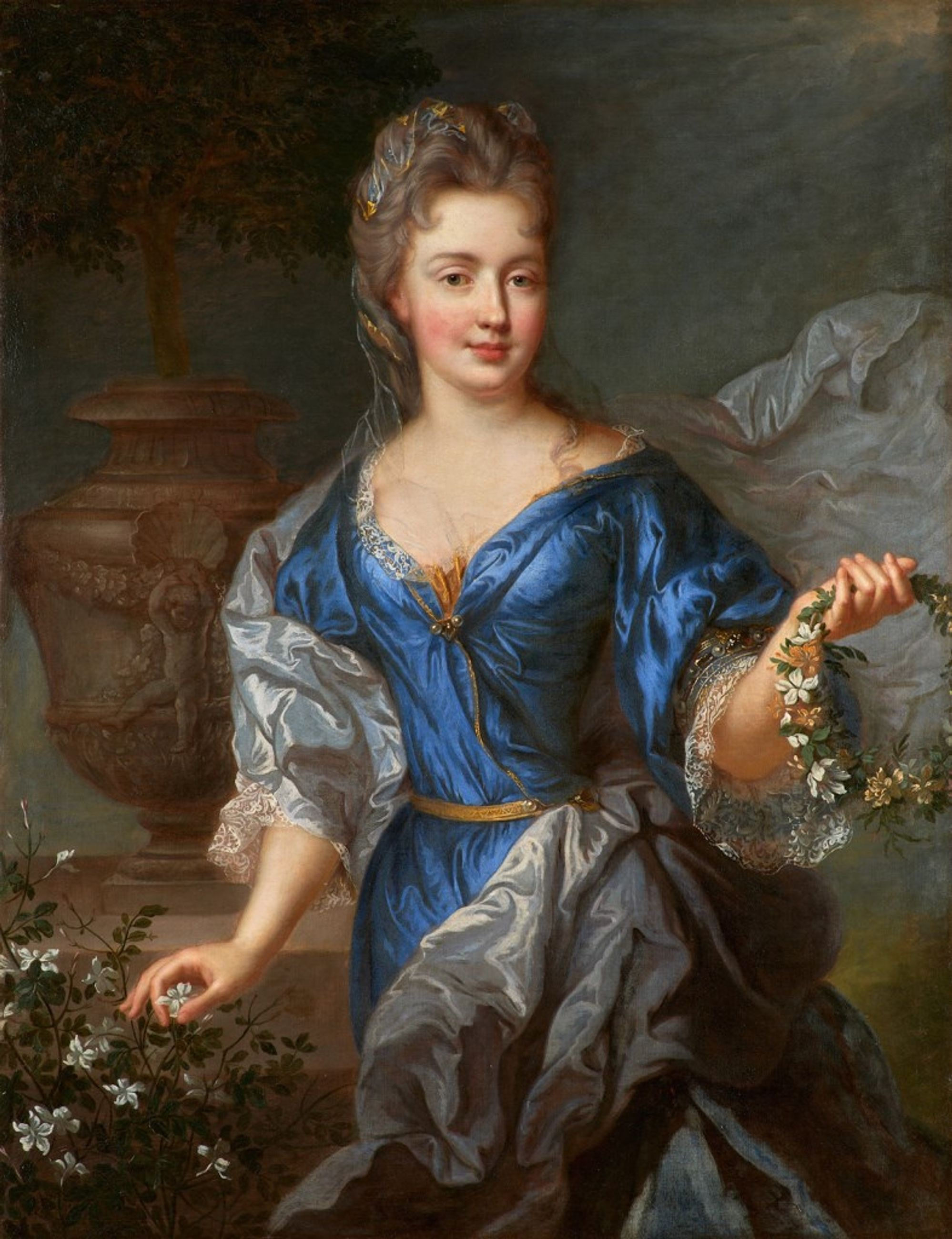
Marie Anne de Bourbon

- 15 February – Claude-Élisée de Court de La Bruyère, naval officer (d. 1752)
- 18 June – Jeanne Delanoue, saint in the Roman Catholic Church (d. 1736)
- 2 October – Marie Anne de Bourbon, Légitimée de France, Duchess of La Vallière (d. 1739)

=== Full date unknown ===
- Léopold Durand, architect (d. 1746)
- Jean d'Estrées, priest and politician (d. 1718)
- Philippe Grandjean, type engraver (d. 1714)

== Deaths ==
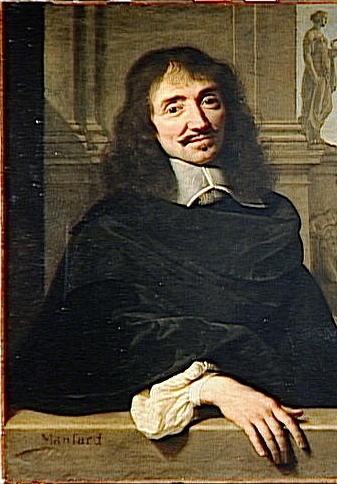
François Mansart

- 20 January – Anne of Austria, Queen of France 1615-1643 (b. 1601)
- 16 February – Jean de Lauson, governor (b. 1584)
- 26 February – Armand de Bourbon, Prince of Conti, nobleman (b. 1629)
- 23 September – François Mansart, architect (b. 1598)
- 23 September – Hannibal Sehested, Dano-Norwegian statesman and diplomat (b. 1609)
- 3 November – Henri-Auguste de Loménie, comte de Brienne, politician (b. 1594)

=== Full date unknown ===
- Louis de La Forge, philosopher (b. 1632)
