= Huquier =

Huquier is a surname. Notable people with the surname include:

- Gabriel Huquier (1695–1772), French drawer (artist), engraver, printmaker, publisher, and art collector
- James Gabriel Huquier (1730–1805), French portrait-painter and engraver
