= Jean-François Cars =

French engraver (1661–1738)

- Born: 16 October 1661; Lyon, France
- Died: 30 August 1738 (aged 76); Paris, France
- Occupations: Engraver, printer, publisher, printseller
- Spouse: Marie Barbery
- Children: Laurent Cars, Agatha Cars
- Parent(s): François Cars (père), Virginie Chesne

Jean-François Cars (16 October 1661 – 30 August 1738) was a French engraver, printer, publisher, and printseller from Lyon, France. Active during the late 17th and early 18th centuries, Cars operated workshops in both Lyon and Paris, producing portraits, book illustrations, and theses for Jesuit colleges. He trained numerous apprentices and established a multi-generational legacy in engraving, notably as the father of Laurent Cars.

== Biography ==
Jean-François Cars was born in Lyons on 16 October 1661, the son of François Cars père [Senior], and his wife, Virginie Chesne. His father was an engraver and printseller who had come from Paris to settle in Lyon, at rue [Street] Mercière, with his brother, Gabriel, also an engraver. They were the sons of Jean Cars, an artisan and a sculptor “de peu de notoriété” [“of little notoriety”] of Paris, and his wife, Maria Firans, the daughter of an engraver. So Jean-François and his brothers, François fils [Junior] (1682–1763) and Joseph, were the fourth generation of engravers in their family. Baptized on the next day, Jean-François had as his godfather another engraver, François Demasso of Lyon, who also worked as a merchant of prints and figurines.

Jean-François learned his craft in the workshop of his father, as well as from the maker of intaglios, Pierre Husson (1675–1676), and the printer of intaglios, Chabrilland. However, his earliest prints by hand dated only from 1693, when, in the wake of his father, he provided the plates for the illustrations of the works being published in Lyon.

On 18 October 1695 in Lyon, Jean-François married a Parisian, Marie Barbery, the sister of the engraver Louis Barbery. They had seven children, including Laurent Cars and a daughter, Agatha, who married the King's printer Gabriel-François Quillau. The family lived with François Cars at first and then settled, under their own sign, “A Saint-Hubert”, at rue Mercière, in 1698. At this shop, Jean-François engraved portraits of local notables as well as vignettes for the works that were being published in Lyon. He also engraved the titles and frontispieces of the books for the libraries of Lyon.

He had several presses and employed several Lyonnaise engravers, including Claude Séraucourt and especially his own brother, François Cars fils.

Jean-François moved to Paris at the beginning of the 18th century, followed by his younger brother, François. However, for nearly ten years, the brothers stayed active in both cities. In Paris, Jean-François had had his shop at rue de la Savonnerie since 1702 yet his youngest son was born in Lyon in December 1704. In 1711, he extended his lease of the Lyonnaise home for five years. In 1720, he bought his own Parisian house at rue Saint-Jacques, where he had already been renting since 1712. It was adjacent to either the Sorbonne or the Collège du Plessis. He changed his shop's sign to “Au Nom de Jésus” [Latin, “At the Name of Jesus”], and, in 1726, he expanded his shop to a bigger building, probably to move his operations. He continued not only to make engravings (an activity he gradually abandoned) but also work as a publisher and seller of prints. He specialized, among other things, the placards for the theses for the Jesuit colleges, especially the ones in Paris and Bordeaux.

Jean-François kept a workshop where many apprentices, especially François Boucher and Jean-Baptiste Perronneau learned and worked; in 1730, it had six presses for making the intaglios. But he also found the time to serve his parish church, Church of Saint-Benoît-le-Bétourné, just down the street from his house, as a commissioner of the poor and a churchwarden.

Jean-François died on 30 August 1738 at his home on rue Saint-Jacques in Paris. He was buried on the next day at the Church of Saint-Benoît-le-Bétourné.

== Engravings ==
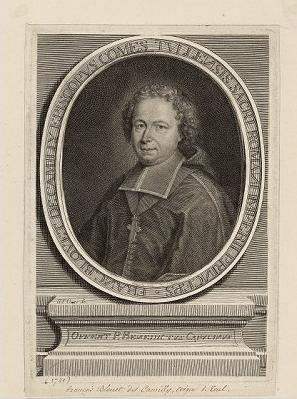
François Blouet de Camilly Archbishop of Tours

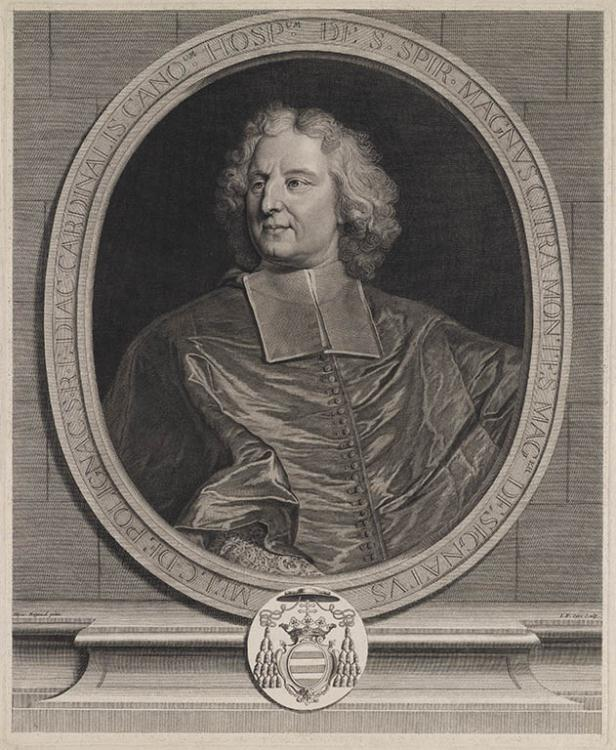
Melchior, Cardinal de Polignac

Jean-François Cars’ works are not comparable to those of his more renowned son, Laurent Cars His plates are sometimes marked “J. F. Cars” but more frequently “J. F. Cars fils [Junior]”. He is known to have engraved the portraits of the following notables:

- Louis XIV, engraved at Lyons, sold at Paris, marked “J. F. C.”
- Père Nicolas de Dijon, Superior of the Order of Capuchins at Lyons, engraved at Lyons, 1694, under the title “R. Ad. P. Nicolas Divionensis” [Latin, “Nicholas of Dijon”] and signed “J. f. Cars le fils”
- Henri, Prince de la Tour d'Auvergne, 1699.
- Charles le Goux de la Berchere, Archbishop of Albi, 1702
- Étienne, Cardinal Le Camus, Bishop of Grenoble, 1703.
- François-Joseph de Grammont, the Archbishop of Besançon, 1706.
- Pierre de Sève, Baron de Fléchères, engraved and signed “J. f. Cars”, 1706, after Rigaud
- François Blouet de Camilly, Archbishop of Tours, 1707
- Camille de Neufville de Villeroy, Archbishop and Count of Lyon, engraved and signed “J. f. Cars”, 1717, after Grandon of Lyons
- Joseph-Jean-Baptiste Fleurieu, Seigneur d’Armenonville, Keeper of the Seals of France [Garde des sceaux de France], 1720, after Rigaud
- Melchior, Cardinal de Polignac, 1720, after Rigaud
- Michel Poncet de la Rivière, Bishop of Angers, 1722, signed “J. F. Cars”
- Dominique de Saint Clair, Bishop of Séez
- Louis Auguste, Prince de Dombes, signed “J. f. Cars le fils”
- Louis, Vicomte d'Aubusson

== Bibliography ==
- (in French) F[rédérique]. Bon, État de la question sur Jean-François Cars, graveur et marchand d'estampes [State of the Question about Jean-François Cars, engraver and printseller] (Lyon, 1661 - Paris, 1738), 2 Volumes (Lyon: Mémoire de DEA, université Lyon II, 1997)
- (in English) Michael Bryan, Bryan’s Dictionary of Paints and Engravers, Biographical and Critical, Volume 1: A—K, edited by Robert Edmund Graves and Sir Walter Armstrong (London: George Bell and Sons, 1886), page 243.
- (in French) Sylvie Martin-de Vesvrotte; Henriette Pommier and Marie Félicie Pérez, Dictionnaire des graveurs-éditeurs et marchands d'estampes à Lyon aux XVIIe et XVIIIe siècles et catalogue des pièces éditées [Dictionary of Engravers, Publishers and Merchants of Prints in Lyon in the 17th and 18th Centuries and Edited Catalogue of the Pieces] (Lyon: Presses universitaires de Lyon [University of Lyon Press], 2002), pages 30-34.
- (in French) Maxime Préaud, Pierre Casselle, Marianne Grivel and Corinne Le Bitouzé, “Jean-François Cars”, Dictionnaire des éditeurs d'estampes à Paris sous l'Ancien Régime [Dictionary of the Publishers of Prints in Paris under the Ancient Regime] (Paris: Promodis / éditions du Cercle de la librairie, 1986), pages 73–74.
- (in French) Natalis Rondot, Les gravers d’estampes sur cuivre à Lyon: au XVIIe siècle [The Engravers of Prints on Copper in Lyon during the 17th Century] (Lyon: Imprimerie Mougin-Rusand, 1896), page 111
