= 1664 in France =

- Decades: 1640s; 1650s; 1660s; 1670s; 1680s
- See also: History of France; Timeline of French history; List of years in France

Events from the year 1664 in France.

== Incumbents ==
- Monarch – Louis XIV

== Events ==
- French West India Company established
- Kronenbourg Brewery established in Strasbourg

== Births ==
- 5 April – Élisabeth Thérèse de Lorraine, noblewoman (died 1748)
- 22 May – François Blouet de Camilly, clergyman (died 1723)
- 16 July – Philippe Charles, Duke of Valois, prince (died 1666)
- 31 August – Paul Lucas, merchant, naturalist, physician and antiquarian (died 1737)

== Deaths ==
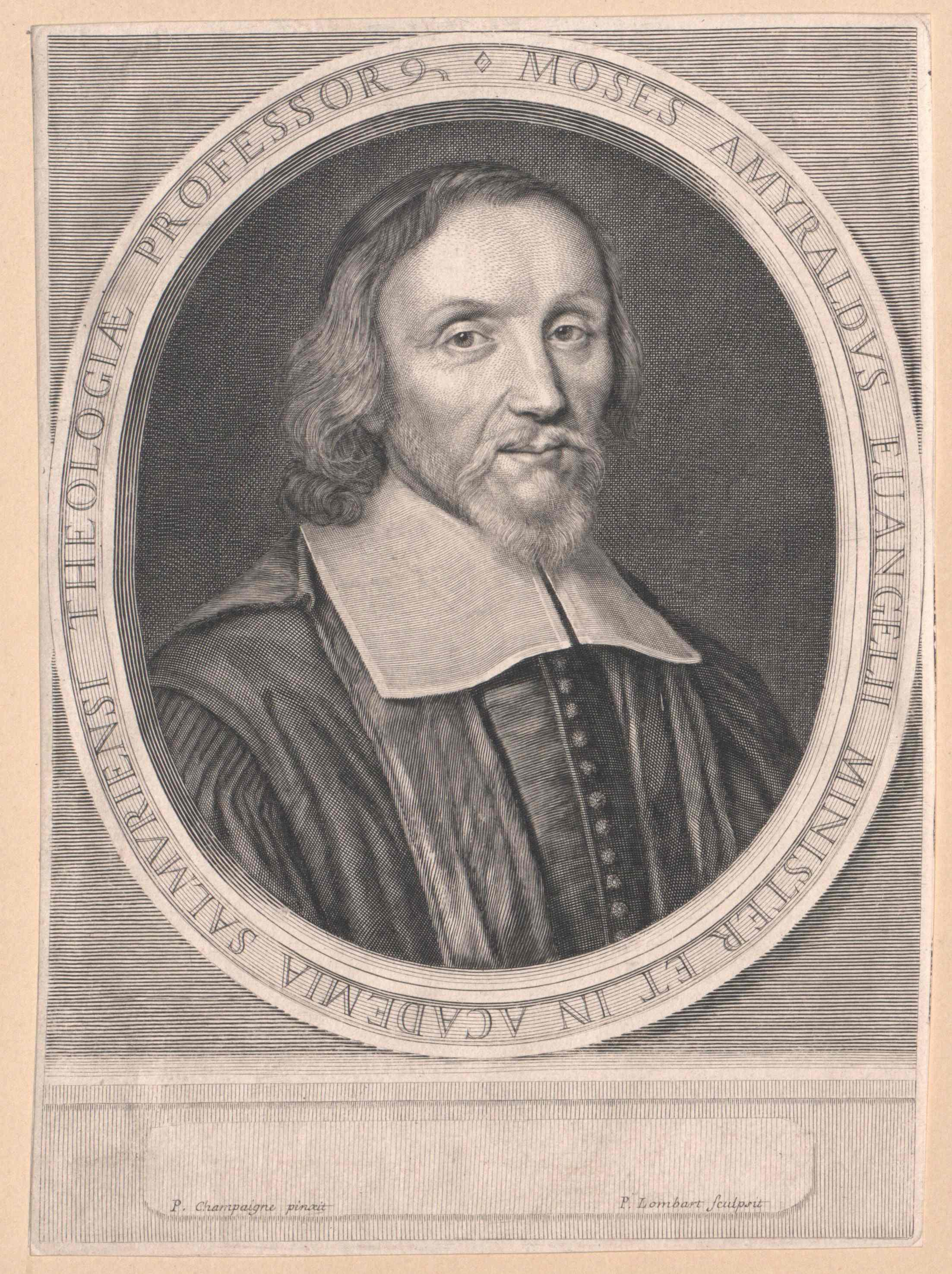
Moïse Amyraut

- 8 January – Moses Amyraut, Protestant theologian and metaphysician (born 1596)
- 17 November – Nicolas Perrot d'Ablancourt, translator (born 1606)

=== Full date unknown ===
- Michel Corneille the Elder, painter (born c.1601)
- Charles Racquet, organist and composer (born 1597)
- Antoine Singlin, Jansenist Catholic priest (born 1607)
- David Derodon, Calvinist theologian and philosopher (born c.1600)

== See also ==
- Kronenbourg 1664, a beer
