= Alexis Peyrotte =

French painter (1699–1769)

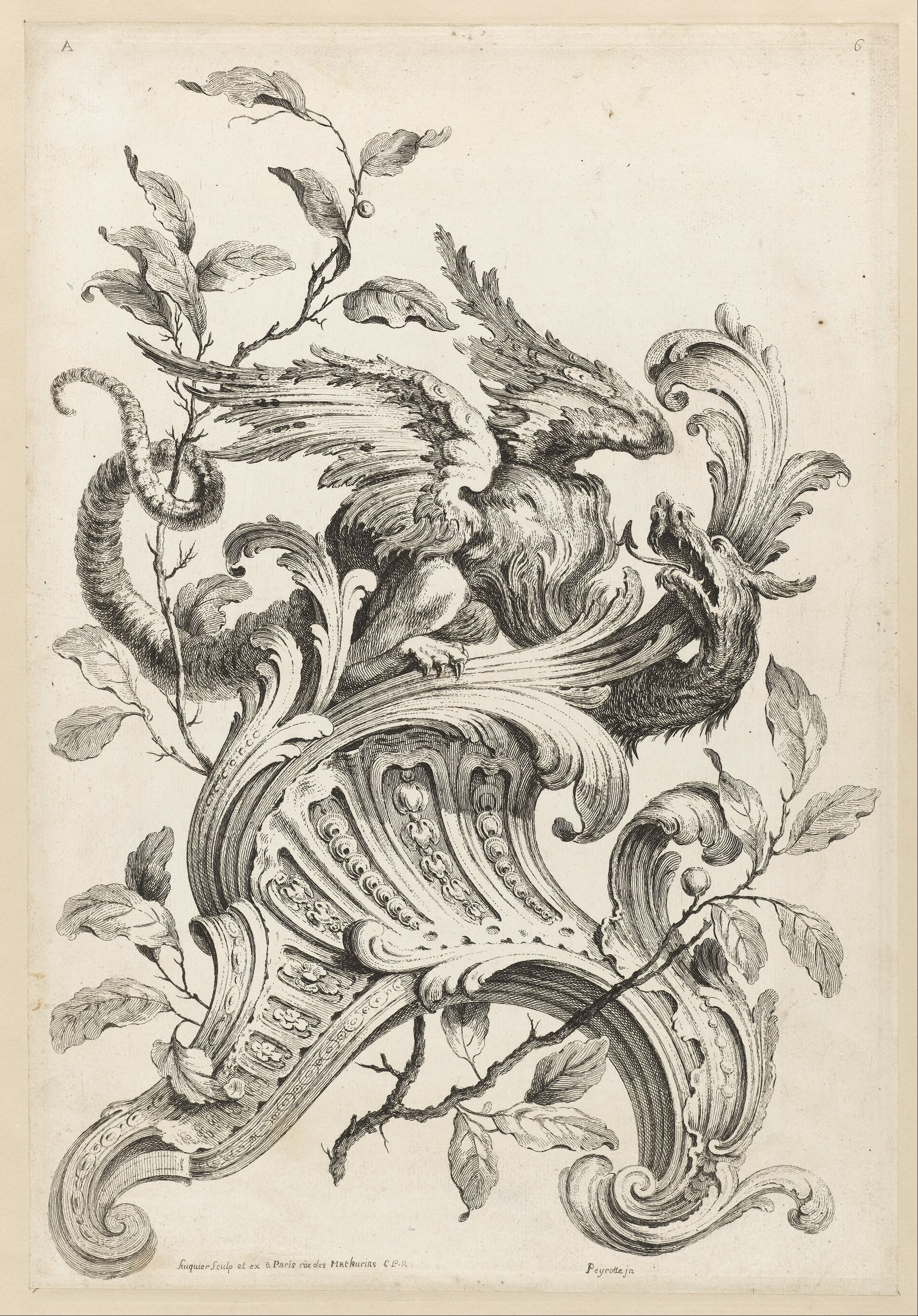
etching on white laid paper, Winged Griffon on a Rocaille Bracket, from Premiere Partie Diverse Ornements by Alexis Peyrotte, Cooper–Hewitt, National Design Museum, 1745

Alexis Peyrotte (1699–1769) was a French decorator painter.

Peyrotte was born in Avignon, Papal States, and was the son of a sculptor. Early in his career he painted in the region of Carpentras (also in the Papal States) parishes and congregations. He participated with Joseph Duplessis to produce art decorations in the pharmacy of the Hôtel-Dieu of Carpentras.

In 1736, he moved to Paris. His decorating work included apartments of the king and queen at Versailles (1738 and 1747), and the Board Room of the Palace of Fontainebleau with Charles-André van Loo, and the Château de Marly. He also worked with the Gobelins Manufactory. He was particularly known for his chinoiserie. A number of his works were engraved and printed by Gabriel Huquier.
