= 1669 in France =

- Decades: 1640s; 1650s; 1660s; 1670s; 1680s
- See also: History of France; Timeline of French history; List of years in France

Events from the year 1669 in France.

== Incumbents ==
- Monarch – Louis XIV

== Events ==
- The Paris Opera was founded
- The École des Jeunes de langues was founded
- The Régiment Royal–La Marine was established

== Births ==
- 17 August – Jean-Baptiste Brutel de la Rivière, Protestant minister (d. 1742)

=== Full date unknown ===
- Charles d'Agar, painter (d. 1723)
- Jacques Bouillart, Benedictine monk (d. 1726)
- Philip Bouquett, linguist (d. 1748)
- Michel-Celse-Roger de Bussy-Rabutin, churchman and diplomat (d. 1736)

== Deaths ==
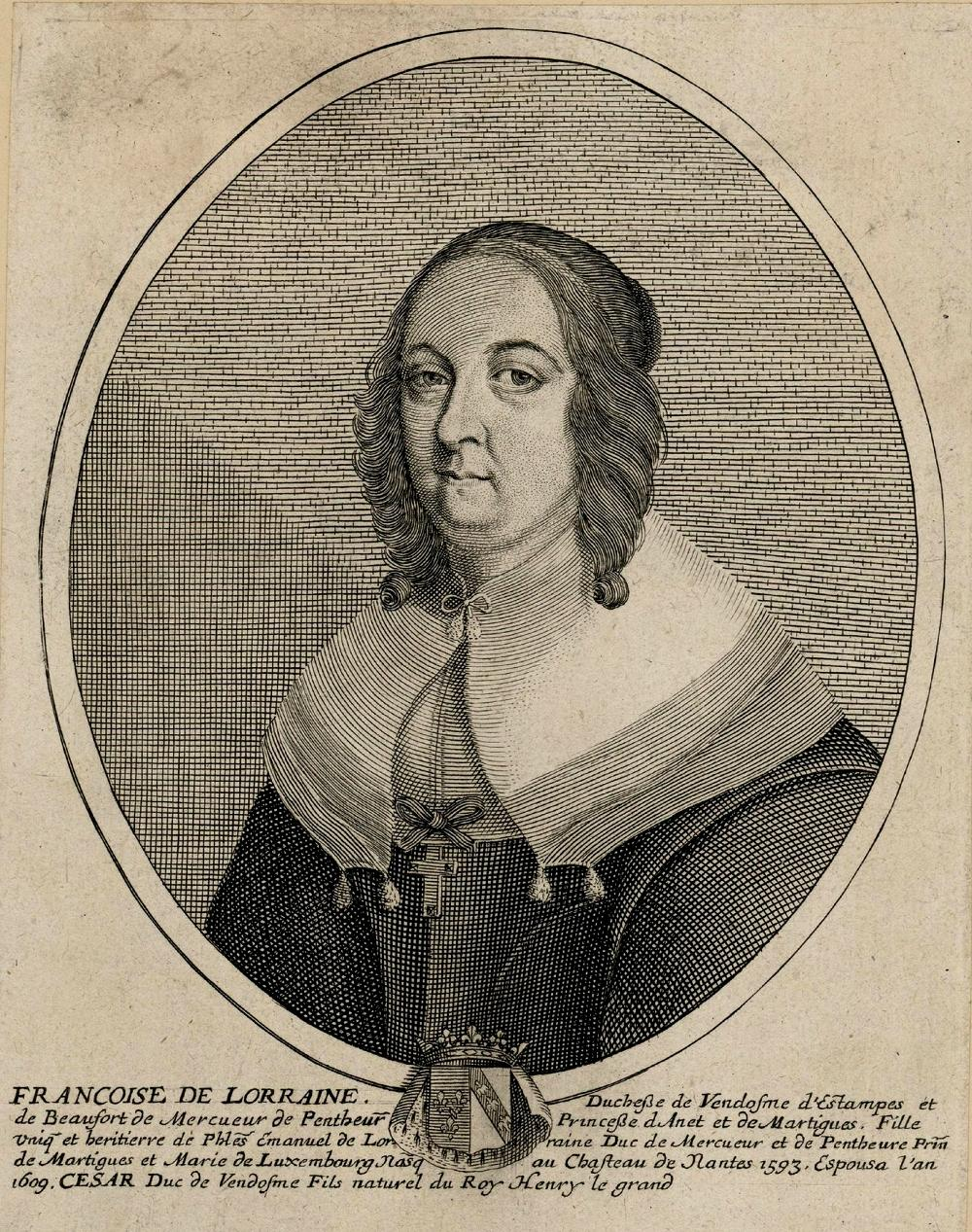
Françoise de Lorraine, Duchess of Vendôme

- 18 March – Gilles Boileau, translator (b. 1631)
- 6 August – Louis, Duke of Vendôme (b. 1612)
- 8 September – Françoise de Lorraine, Duchess of Vendôme (b. 1592)
- 10 September – Henrietta Maria of France, Queen of England, Scotland, and Ireland (b. 1609)
- 29 December – Marin Cureau de la Chambre, physician and philosopher (b. 1594)

=== Full date unknown ===
- Pierre Affre, sculptor (b. 1509)
- François Anguier, sculptor (born c.1604)
