= 1667 in France =

- Decades: 1640s; 1650s; 1660s; 1670s; 1680s
- See also: History of France; Timeline of French history; List of years in France

Events from the year 1667 in France.

== Incumbents ==
- Monarch – Louis XIV

== Events ==
- March – Louis XIV abolishes the livre parisis (Paris pound), in favor of the much more widely used livre tournois (Tours pound). He also designates Gabriel Nicolas de la Reynie as the first chief of police of Paris.
- 24 May – The War of Devolution begins: France invades Flanders and Franche-Comté; on 10 August the siege of Lille, the war's only main engagement, begins, ending in a French victory.
- 26 June – Louis XIV conquers Tournai.
- 31 July – The Treaty of Breda ends the Second Anglo-Dutch War and recognizes Acadia as a French possession.

== Births ==
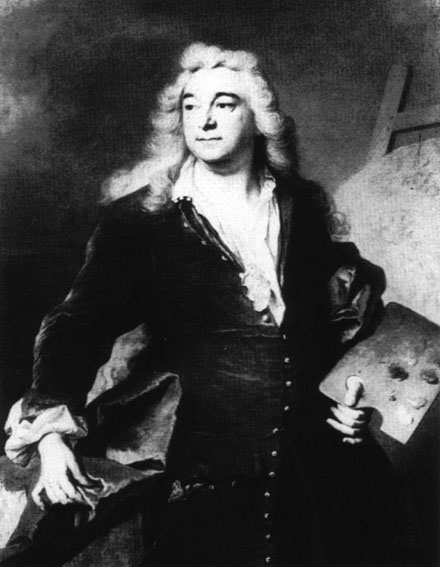
Nicolas Bertin

- 2 November – James Louis Sobieski, Prince of Poland (died 1737)

=== Full date unknown ===
- Nicolas Bertin, painter (died 1736)

== Deaths ==
- 16 or 17 March – Philippe Labbe, Jesuit writer on historical, geographical and philological issues (born 1607)
- 16 May – Samuel Bochart, biblical scholar (born 1599)
