= Jeanne Delanoue =

French Roman Catholic saint

Saint Jeanne Delanoue
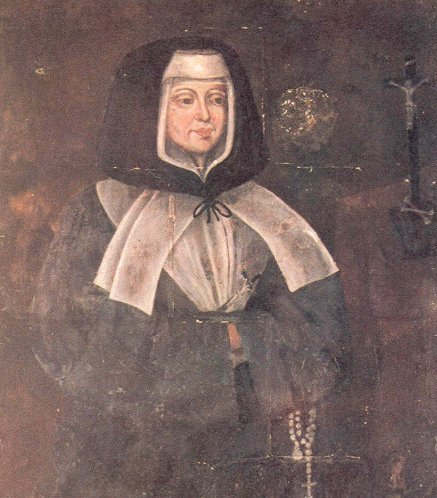

Virgin
- Born: 18 June 1666; Saumur, France
- Died: 17 August 1736 (aged 70); Saumur, France
- Venerated in: Roman Catholic Church
- Beatified: 8 November 1947 by Pope Pius XII
- Canonized: 31 October 1982 by Pope John Paul II
- Feast: 17 August

Jeanne Delanoue, religious name Joan of the Cross, (18 June 1666 – 17 August 1736) was the founder of the Congregation of St. Anne of Providence, and is venerated as a saint in the Roman Catholic Church.

== Biography ==
=== Early life ===
Delanoue was born in Saumur, located in the region of Anjoú, France, the youngest of twelve children. Her parents had a shop in the city's Fenêt district, near the shrine of Notre-Dame-des-Ardilliers. Her father was a draper, who died when she was six years old. She helped her mother run the shop selling religious goods, catering to pilgrims to the shrine. She took over the business at the age of 25 when her mother died. She also provided accommodations to pilgrims who were visiting the shrine. A skillful businesswoman, she kept the store open even on Sundays and holydays, which was considered somewhat scandalous in 17th century France. Her early life was characterized as one of self-centeredness, pride and avarice.

=== Conversion ===
On Pentecost 1693, Delanoue encountered Francoise Fouchet, a poor widowed pilgrim from Rennes, who predicted that Jeanne would one day spend her life caring for the poor. She greeted this prediction with some skepticism; but as time passed, caring for the less fortunate began to take up more of her time. She began by visiting the poor in her neighborhood. Eventually she closed the family business to commit herself more fully to this work. Her house, near the Loire, had caves and cellars similar to those of wine merchants, in which she provided shelter for orphans, the sick, the aged, and the indigent. Delanoue gave particular attention especially to abandoned single mothers and prostitutes. A landslide during the earthquake in 1703 destroyed her home, but undeterred, she found another. Many of the poor could only find shelter in the caves carved out of the tuff along the Loire. She made them as comfortable as she could.

In 1704, she was joined by a few other young women who shared her vision of helping the needy. Thus was founded the Sisters of Saint Anne of Providence of Saumur. Her work was endorsed by noted preacher Louis de Montfort. Delanoue founded Providence House, which during the famine of 1709, cared for about 100 people. That same year, Michel Poncet de La Rivière, Bishop of Angers approved the constitutions of the small congregation.

In 1715, she established Saumur's first home for the poor. Delanoue died of natural causes on 17 August 1736 in Fenêt, where she lived her whole life. At the time of her death there were twelve communities of her sisters, spread throughout France, serving the poor and needy.

== Veneration ==
Jeanne Delanoue was beatified on November 9, 1947 by Pope Pius XII, and the cause for her canonization was opened on January 7, 1951. She was canonized in October 1982 by Pope John Paul II. Her feast day is August 17. The Roman martyrology writes:

In Saumur, in 1736, Saint Jeanne Delanoue, virgin. With total confidence in the Providence of God, she first welcomed home orphans, old women, the sick, and lost women, then, with companions, she founded the Institute of the Sisters of Saint Anne-of-Providence.

The congregation Jeanne founded was renamed as Congregation of the Sisters of St. Anne of Providence on 3 December 1964. As of 2021, over 400 members serve the poor in France, Madagascar and Sumatra.

La Nef ardente is an oratorio by Michel Bosc about Jeanne Delanoue.

== See also ==
- List of saints canonized by Pope John Paul II
