= Montils =

- Commune
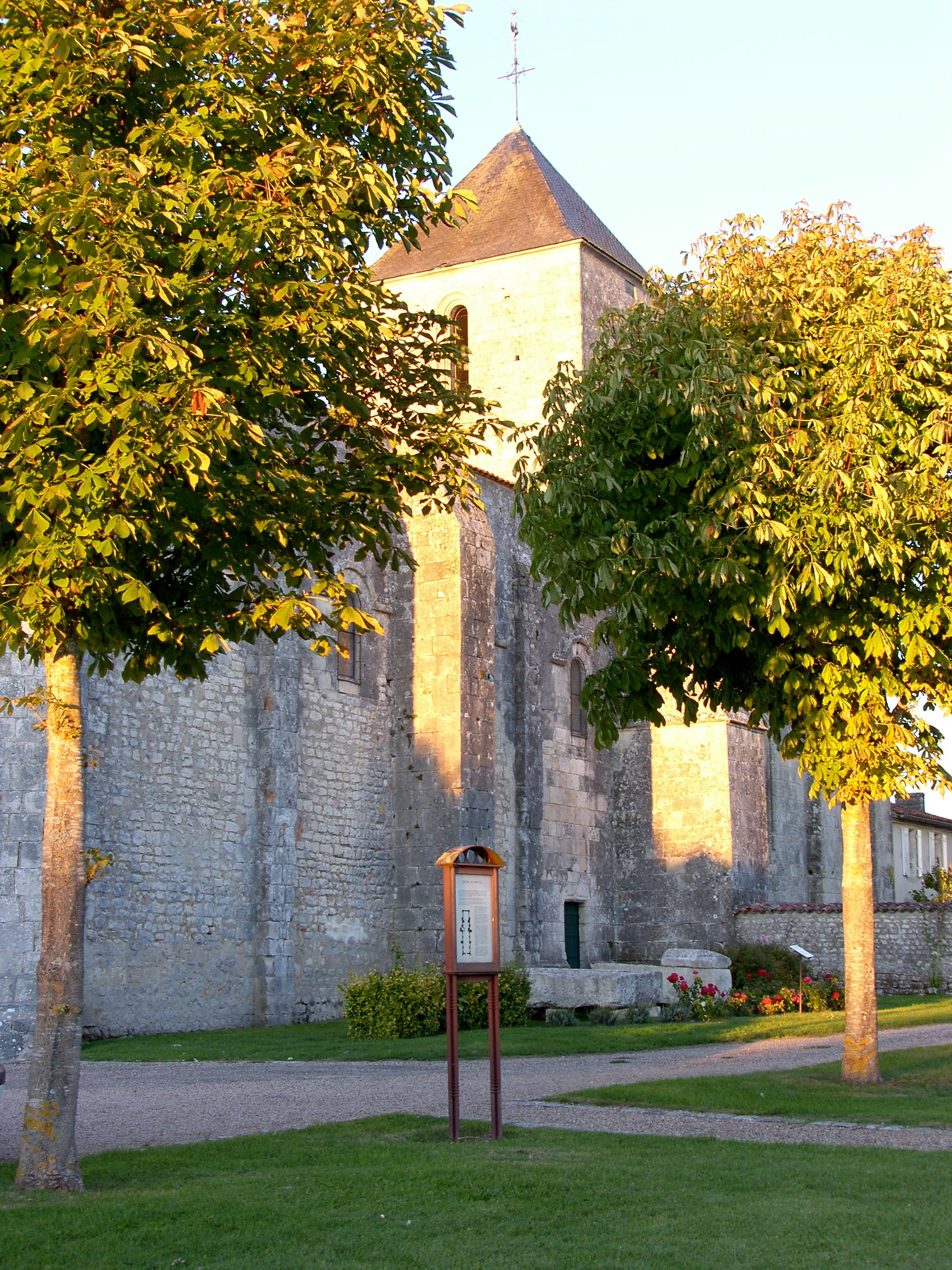
- The church in Montils

- Coat of arms
- Location of Montils
- Location within France Location within Nouvelle-Aquitaine
- Coordinates: 45°38′55″N 0°30′08″W
- Country: France
- Region: Nouvelle-Aquitaine
- Department: Charente-Maritime
- Arrondissement: Saintes
- Canton: Thénac
- Intercommunality: CA Saintes

Government
  - Mayor (2020–2026): Victor Alain Nguewoua
- Area^{1}: 23.64 km^{2} (9.13 sq mi)
- Highest elevation: 56 m (184 ft)
- Lowest elevation: 2 m (6.6 ft)
- Population (2023): 867
  - Density: 36.7/km^{2} (95.0/sq mi)
- Time zone: UTC+01:00 (CET)
  - Summer (DST): UTC+02:00 (CEST)
- INSEE/Postal code: 17242 /17800
- Website: www.montils.fr
- ^{1} French Land Register data, which excludes lakes, ponds, glaciers > 1 km^{2} (0.386 sq mi or 247 acres) and river estuaries.

Montils (French pronunciation: [mɔ̃ti(l)]) is a commune in the Charente-Maritime department in southwestern France. The 17th–18th actor Louis Deseschaliers was born in Montils.

Montils is also the name of a grape grown in this area to make white Pineau des Charentes and Cognac.

== Geography ==
The Seugne flows north-northwest through the western part of the commune.

== Population ==
Historical population
Year	Pop.	±% p.a.
1968	647	—
1975	620	−0.61%
1982	617	−0.07%
1990	644	+0.54%
1999	652	+0.14%
2007	731	+1.44%
2012	815	+2.20%
2017	853	+0.92%
2023	867	+0.27%
Source: INSEE

== See also ==
- Communes of the Charente-Maritime department
