= 1671 in France =

- Decades: 1650s; 1660s; 1670s; 1680s; 1690s
- See also: History of France; Timeline of French history; List of years in France

Events from the year 1671 in France.

== Incumbents ==
- Monarch: Louis XIV

== Events ==
- 30 December – The Académie royale d'architecture is founded by Louis XIV in Paris, the world's first school of architecture.

== Births ==
- 11 January – François-Marie, 1st duc de Broglie, French military leader (d. 1745)
- 6 April – Jean-Baptiste Rousseau, French poet (d. 1741)
- 14 July – Jacques d'Allonville, French astronomer and mathematician (d. 1732)
