= James Gabriel Huquier =

French painter

James Gabriel Huquier, originally Jacques-Gabriel (1730–1805) was a portrait-painter and engraver. He was the son of the roccoco engraver Gabriel Huquier and his wife Marie-Ann (Desvignes). One of Huquier's subjects was Chevalier d'Eon, an early transvestite.

== Life ==
Huquier was born in Paris in 1730. His father was an engraver in the style of Watteau and Boucher. His father's work based on the style of J. A. Meissonnier and Oppenord helped set styles in Louis XV's reign with regard to furniture, silver, and other decorative ornament.

James Huquier assisted his father in many of his engravings. He married Anne Louise, the daughter of the engraver Jacques Chéreau, in 1758 in Paris. He collaborated as an engraver and printseller with his father-in-law. They created a shop that sold wallpapers and prints in 1764 and two years later they had a wallpaper factory. The business appears to have struggled, however, and after making a number of excursions, Huquier left his family behind and moved to England.

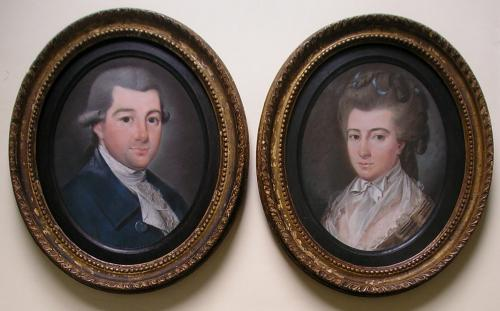
Mr and Mrs Hall of Bristol

Huquier emigrated to England with his father. He exhibited some pastels at the Royal Academy and was also represented at the Society of Artists. Huquier also completed a number of pastel portraits which sold well. He had a self-portrait in the Royal Academy in 1771 and in 1785. The pastels illustrated are on paper and are of Mr Hall, a Bristol-based glass manufacturer, and his wife.

One of Huquier's more remarkable subjects was Chevalier d'Eon, a French spy who served as an ambassador in London. Chevalier d'Eon was notably transvestite and an early transgender person . The Chevalier spent the end of her life living as a woman.

In 1783, Huquier lived in Cambridge but later retired to Shrewsbury. As Huquier's wife Anne Louise had already died, he may have thought to benefit when his father-in-law and collaborator died. In the event, however, his three daughters Julie-Marie, Rosalie, and Anne-Geneviève were left shares, and were made wards of their cousin, Jacques-Francois Chéreau. Huquier died on 7 June 1805.
