= Laurent Cars =

French designer and engraver

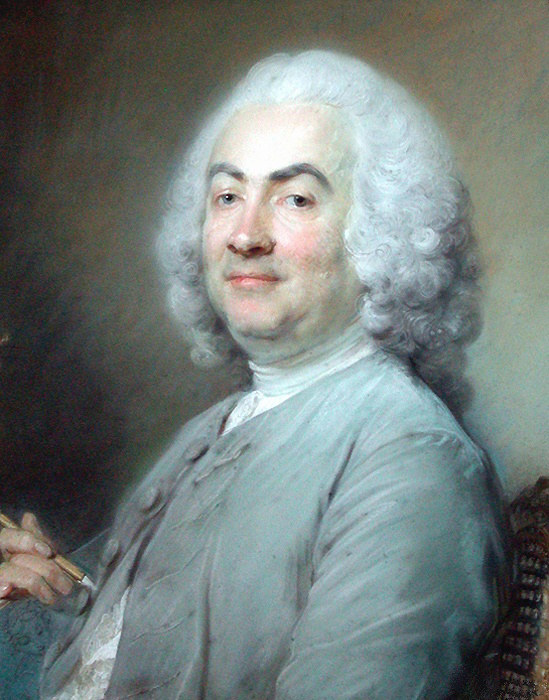
Portrait of Laurent Cars by Jean-Baptiste Perronneau, pastel, 1745, now at the Louvre.

Laurent Cars (28 May 1699 – 14 April 1771) was a French designer and engraver.

He was born at Lyon, the son of Jean-François Cars, who took him when quite young to Paris, where it was not long before he distinguished himself. In 1733 he was received as an Academician upon his portraits of Michel Anguier and Sébastien Bourdon. Cars, who was the master of Beauvarlet, may be considered one of the best French engravers of the 18th century, in the kind of subjects he selected. He died in Paris in 1771. His best plates are those engraved after Lemoyne, particularly that of 'Hercules and Omphale,' and the series of illustrations after Boucher's designs to the Comedies of Molière, and after Oudry to the Fables of La Fontaine. His work is extensive; the following are his principal plates:

== Portraits ==
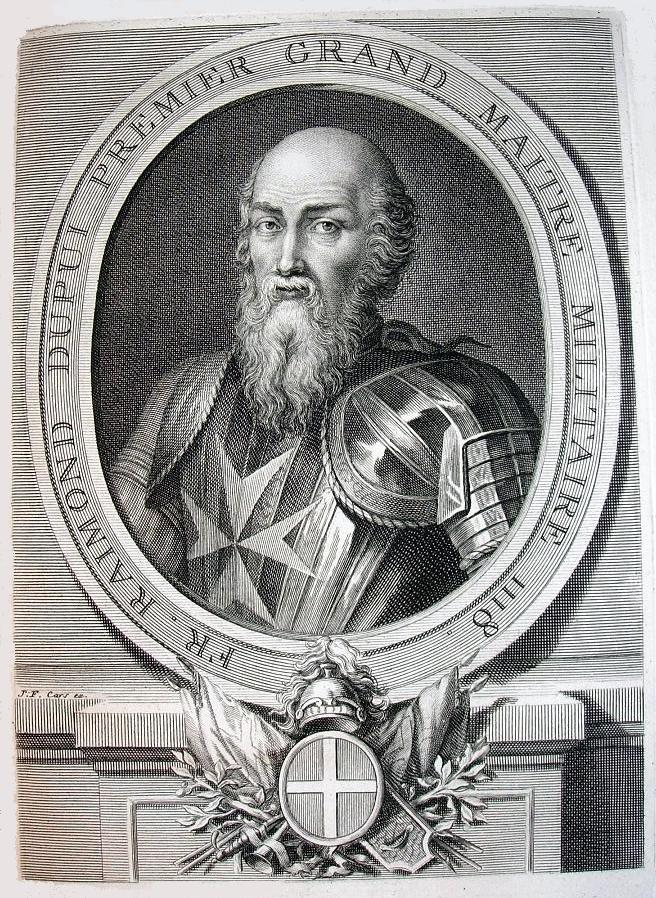
Raymond du Puy de Provence, portrait from circa 1725.

- Louis XV, an allegorical portrait; after Lemoyne.
- Louis XV, an allegorical subject; after Boucher.
- Stanislaus, King of Poland; after van Loo.
- Michel Anguier, sculptor; after Revel.
- Cardinal Armand Gaston de Rohan; after Rigaud.
- Marie Leszczinska, Queen of France; after Van Loo.
- François Boucher, painter; after Cochin, fils.
- Jean Baptiste Chardin, painter; after Cochin, fils.
- Madame Chardin; after Cochin, fils.
- Mlle. Camargo, dancing; after Lancret.
- Mlle. Clairon, in the part of Medea.

== Subjects after various masters ==
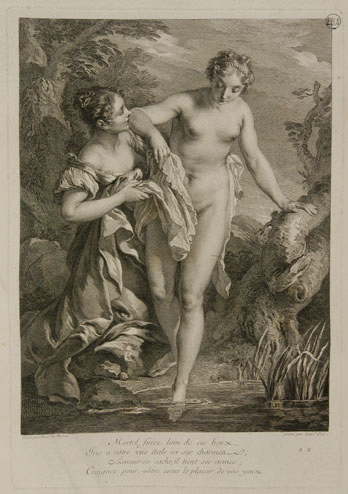
Iris at the bath, 1731, after Lemoyne.

- The Adoration of the Shepherds; after van Loo.
- The Flight into Egypt; after van Loo.
- Bathsheba at the Bath; after De Troy.
- Susannah and the Elders; after De Troy.
- Adam and Eve in Paradise; after Lemoyne.
- Hercules and Omphale; after Lemoyne.
- Perseus and Andromeda; after Lemoyne.
- The Sacrifice of Iphigenia; after Lemoyne.
- Hercules and Cacus; after Lemoyne.
- Iris at the Bath; after Lemoyne.(pictured)
- Cephalus and Aurora; after Lemoyne.
- The Rape of Europa; after Lemoyne.
- Time discovering Truth; after Lemoyne.
- Monument in honour of the Duke of Marlborough.
- Silence; after Greuze.
- L'Aveugle trompé, after Greuze.
- The Fortune-teller; after Watteau.
- The Venetian Festival; after Watteau.
- A Convoy of Equipages; after Watteau.
