= Jean-Jacques Quesnot de La Chênée =

French playwright and theatre manager

Jean-Jacques Quesnot de La Chênée was a French playwright and theatre manager at the end of the 17th century who performed mainly in the Spanish Netherlands.

The son of Daniel Quesnot (1630–1702), a Protestant minister in Langlade and Clarensac, and Louise Bacuet (or Baccuet), he studied pharmacy and married Marie Roux in Mizoën 15 December 1680. After the Revocation of the Edict of Nantes (1685), he moved to Brandenburg and established in Berlin a braid factory which does not seem to have prospered. He transferred his industry to Denmark. On the death of his father, he returned to France in 1688 to collect his inheritance, but a collateral relative who had already taken hold of it, denounced him. He was arrested on charges of having come into the Dauphiné only to hire newly converted workers and persuade them to go to Denmark. He was detained for several months in different prisons of the diocese of Grenoble. He was eventually released on the pressing demands of the Ambassador of Denmark.

Quesnot then returned to his adopted country. In a petition he addressed to "their High Powers", he adopted the pompous title of "Intendant of Delights of the King of Prussia".

After he stayed six months in Warsaw in the last years of the seventeenth century, Quesnot gathered a troupe in Paris to go to The Hague, which was placed under the direction of Louis Deseschaliers and his wife. The contract was signed on 1 October 1701. But misunderstandings grew between the couple and the intendant, and Quesnot was eventually ousted from the troupe's leadership. In 1704 he asked and obtained permission to present theater plays in The Hague. However the Deseschaliers opposed him and finally a year later, Quesnot was banned from the place. He then went to Brussels, where he probably only spent one season in the Théâtre de la Monnaie, after which he was director of the theatre of Ghent from July 1706 to January 1707.

Back in The Hague and Amsterdam, he again opened theaters but setbacks made him give up acting. He died n Amsterdam and was buried on 8 November 1708 in the Westerkerkhof.

== Bibliography ==
- L'Innocence accablée, ou le Prisonnier trahi, Cologne, Guillaume Forbenius, 1689.
- La Femme démasquée, ou l'Amour peint selon l'usage nouveau, The Hague, Abraham De Hondt, 1698; Jena, Meyer, 1701.
- Parnasse belgique, ou Portraits caractérisés des principaux sujets, qui l'ont composé depuis le premier janvier 1705 jusqu'au seize may 1706, Cologne, Héritiers de Pierre Le Sincère, 1706. Imprimé sous l'anonyme à Gand, chez Corneille Meyer (Read online).
- L'Opéra de La Haye. Histoire instructive et galante, Cologne, Héritiers de Pierre Le Sincère, 1706. Imprimé sous l'anonyme (Read online).
- La Bataille de Ramelie ou les Glorieuses Conquestes des Alliez, Gand, Héritiers de Maximilien Great, 1706.
- La Bataille de Hoogstet, l'auteur, 1707.
- Le Parallèle de Philippe II et de Louis XIV, Cologne, Jacques Le Sincère, 1709 (Read online).

== Sources ==
- Jean-Jacques Quesnot de la Chênée on Google Play
- Eugène et Émile Haag, La France protestante, Paris, Cherbuliez, 1846–1859, t. VIII, pp. 339–340.
- J. Fransen, Les comédiens français en Hollande au XVIIe et au XVIIIe siècles, Paris, Champion, 1925, (p. 194–225).
