= 1670 in France =

- Decades: 1650s; 1660s; 1670s; 1680s; 1690s
- See also: History of France; Timeline of French history; List of years in France

Events from the year 1670 in France.

== Incumbents ==
- Monarch – Louis XIV

== Events ==
- January – Françoise-Marguerite, daughter of Marie de Rabutin-Chantal, marquise de Sévigné, marries the Comte de Grignan.
- 1 June – At Dover, England, Louis XIV and Charles II of England sign the Secret Treaty of Dover, ending hostilities between their kingdoms. Louis will give Charles 200,000 pounds annually. In return, Charles will relax the laws against Catholics, gradually re-Catholicize England, support French policy against the Dutch Republic, and convert to Catholicism himself.
- 14 October – The première of Molière's 5-act comédie-ballet Le Bourgeois gentilhomme is performed by his troupe with himself in the title rôle before Louis XIV and the royal court at the Château de Chambord, with incidental music by Jean-Baptiste Lully.
- 21 November – The première of Racine's tragedy Berenice takes place with the Comédiens du Roi at the Hôtel de Bourgogne in Paris.
- 24 November – Louis XIV authorises work to commence on construction of Les Invalides, the veterans' hospital in Paris.
- The first French settlers arrive at the Petite Côte of modern-day Senegal.
- Jean Picard calculates the Earth radius to within 0.44% of the modern value.

== Births ==
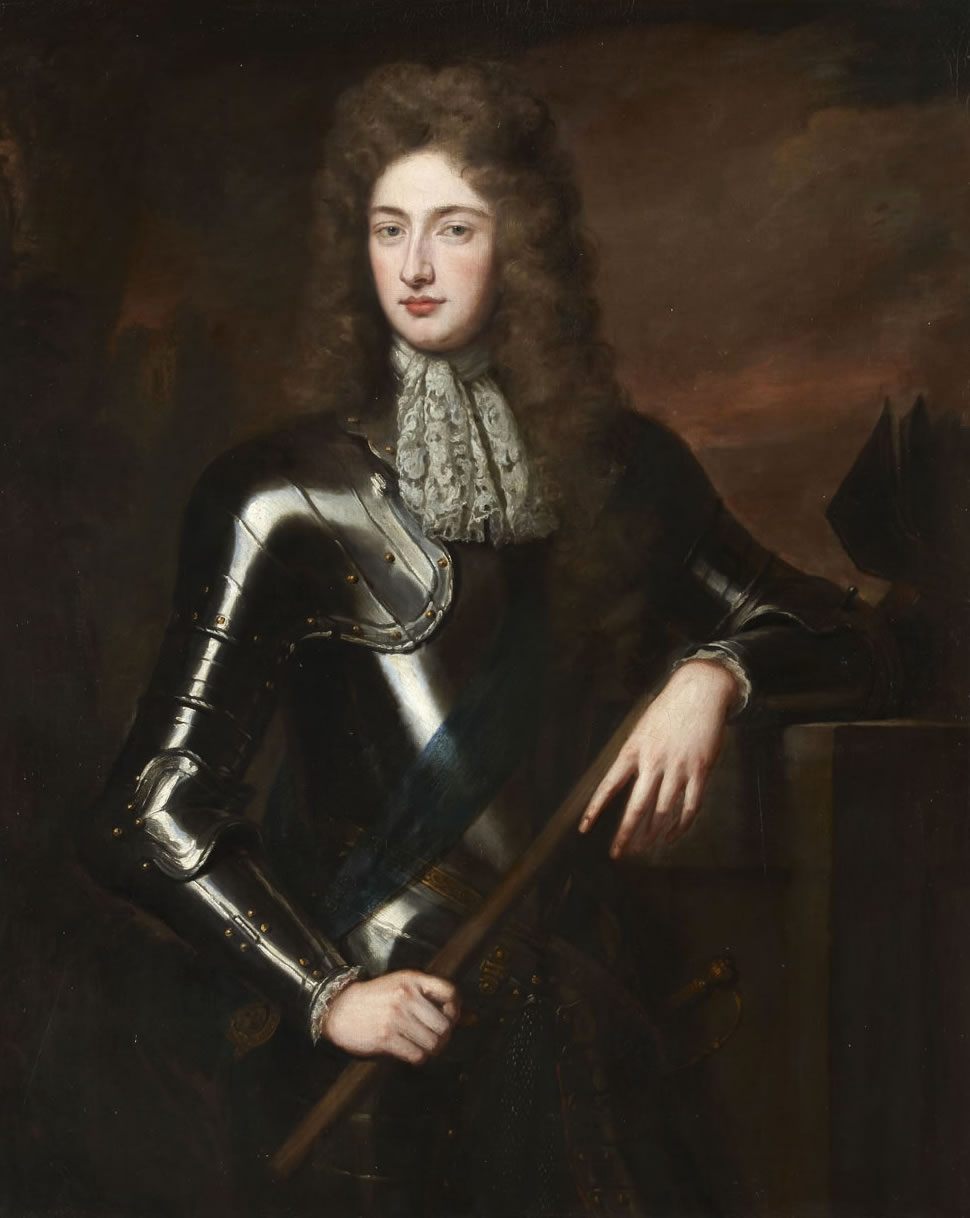
James FitzJames, 1st Duke of Berwick

- 21 August – James FitzJames, 1st Duke of Berwick, military leader (died 1734)
- 24 August – Louis Galloche, French painter (died 1761)
- 14 December – Jean-Baptiste Dubos, historian (died 1742)

=== Full date unknown ===
- Louis Audran, engraver (died 1712)
- François Boitard, printmaker and illustrator (died ca. 1715)
- Catherine-Charlotte de Boufflers, court official (died 1739)

== Deaths ==
- 17 January – Jean Leurechon, Jesuit priest and mathematician (born 1591)
- 21 January
  - Honorat de Bueil, seigneur de Racan, aristocrat, soldier, poet, dramatist and original member of the Académie française (born 1589)
  - Claude Duval, highwayman, hanged in England (born 1643)
- 2 March – François-Henri Salomon de Virelade, lawyer (born 1620)
- 10 March – Ludovicus a S. Carolo, Carmelite scholar, writer, and bibliographer (born 1608)
- 9 April – Samuel de Sorbiere, physician, philosopher, and translator (born 1615)
- 28 April – Alexandre de Prouville de Tracy, aristocrat, statesman and military leader (born 1596 or 1603)
- 10 May – Claude Vignon, painter (born 1593)
- 14 June – François Annat, Jesuit theologian (born 1590)
- 11 September – Jeanne Chezard de Matel, mystic (born 1596)
- 28 September – Alexander Morus, Calvinist preacher (born 1616)
- 11 October – Louis Le Vau, architect (born 1612)

=== Full date unknown ===
- Nicolas Prévost, painter (born 1604)
