= 1674 in France =

- Decades: 1650s; 1660s; 1670s; 1680s; 1690s
- See also: History of France; Timeline of French history; List of years in France

Events from the year 1674 in France.

== Incumbents ==
- Monarch: Louis XIV

== Events ==
- August 11 – Battle of Seneffe: The French army under Louis II de Bourbon, Prince de Condé defeats the Dutch–Spanish–Austrian army under William III of Orange.
- December 4 – Father Jacques Marquette founds a mission on the shores of Lake Michigan to minister to the Illinois Confederation (which will in time grow into the city of Chicago).

== Births ==
- January 15 – Prosper Jolyot de Crébillon, French writer (d. 1762)
- August 2 – Philippe II, Duke of Orléans, regent of France (d. 1723)

== Deaths ==
- February 22 – Jean Chapelain, French writer (b. 1595)
- March 8 – Charles Sorel, sieur de Souvigny, French writer (b. 1597)
- June 14 – Marin le Roy de Gomberville, French writer (b. 1600)
- August 12 – Philippe de Champaigne, French painter (b. 1602)
