= 1665 in France =

- Decades: 1640s; 1650s; 1660s; 1670s; 1680s
- See also: History of France; Timeline of French history; List of years in France

Events from the year 1665 in France.

== Incumbents ==
- Monarch: Louis XIV

== Events ==
- January 5 – The Journal des sçavans begins publication, the world's first scientific journal.
- October 21 – Manufacture royale de glaces de miroirs (Royal Mirror-Glass Factory, a predecessor of Saint-Gobain), is established by royal letters patent issued by Jean-Baptiste Colbert in Paris.
- Colonisation of Réunion begins with the French East India Company sending twenty settlers.

== Arts and literature ==
- February 15 – Molière's comedy Dom Juan is first presented, at the Théâtre du Palais-Royal (rue Saint-Honoré) in Paris, in its original prose version with the playwright playing Sganarelle; it is withdrawn after 15 performances following attacks on its morality.
- April–November – Italian sculptor Gian Lorenzo Bernini is fêted in Paris.
- April 17 – Roger de Rabutin, Comte de Bussy (elected this year to the Académie française), begins a year's imprisonment in the Bastille for besmirching the reputation of the ladies of the French Court in Histoire amoureuse des Gaules.
- September 22 – Molière's L'Amour médecin is first presented, before Louis XIV at the Palace of Versailles with music by Jean-Baptiste Lully.
- December 4 – Jean Racine's tragedy Alexandre le Grand is premièred by Molière's troupe at the Théâtre du Palais-Royal (rue Saint-Honoré) in Paris. 11 days later, Racine moves it to the Comédiens du Roi at the Hôtel de Bourgogne, causing a rift with Molière.
- Guillaume-Gabriel Nivers publishes Livre d'orgue contenant cent pièces de tous les tons de l'église, the first organ collection that featured forms that became standard for the Baroque French organ school.
- Claude Perrault begins work on the eastern wing of the Louvre.

== Births ==
- March 12 – Jean-François Foucquet, Jesuit prelate, missionary and scientist (d. 1741)
- March 17 – Élisabeth Jacquet de La Guerre, harpsichordist and composer (d. 1729)
- April 19 – Jacques Lelong, bibliographer (d. 1721).

== Deaths ==
- January 11 – Louise de La Fayette, courtier, friend of King Louis XIII (b. 1618)
- January 12 – Pierre de Fermat, mathematician (b. 1601)
- January 29 – Jeanne des Anges, Ursuline nun in Loudun (b. 1602)
- April 21 – Jean-Joseph Surin, Jesuit writer (b. 1600)
- July 28 – Louis Giry, lawyer and classical scholar (b. 1596)
- October 22 – César, Duke of Vendôme, nobleman (b. 1594)
- November 19 – Nicolas Poussin, painter (b. 1594)
- November 24 – Simon Le Moyne, missionary (b. 1604)
- December 2 – Catherine de Vivonne, marquise de Rambouillet, socialite (b. 1588)
