= 1668 in France =

- Decades: 1640s; 1650s; 1660s; 1670s; 1680s
- See also: History of France; Timeline of French history; List of years in France

Events from the year 1668 in France.

== Incumbents ==
- Monarch: Louis XIV

== Events ==
- May 2 – The first Treaty of Aix-la-Chapelle ends the War of Devolution.
- September 9 – Molière's comedy The Miser (L'Avare) is first performed, in Paris.

== Births ==
- May 8 – Alain-René Lesage, novelist and playwright (d. 1747)
- November 10
  - Louis, Prince of Condé, Bourbon royal duke (d. 1710)
  - François Couperin, composer (d. 1733)
- November 27 – Henri François d'Aguesseau, Chancellor of France (d. 1751)

== Deaths ==
- May 8 – Catherine of St. Augustine, canoness and nurse of New France (b. 1632)
- December 11 – Marquise-Thérèse de Gorla, actress (b. 1633)
