= 1672 in France =

- Decades: 1650s; 1660s; 1670s; 1680s; 1690s
- See also: History of France; Timeline of French history; List of years in France

Events from the year 1672 in France.

== Incumbents ==
- Monarch – Louis XIV

== Events ==
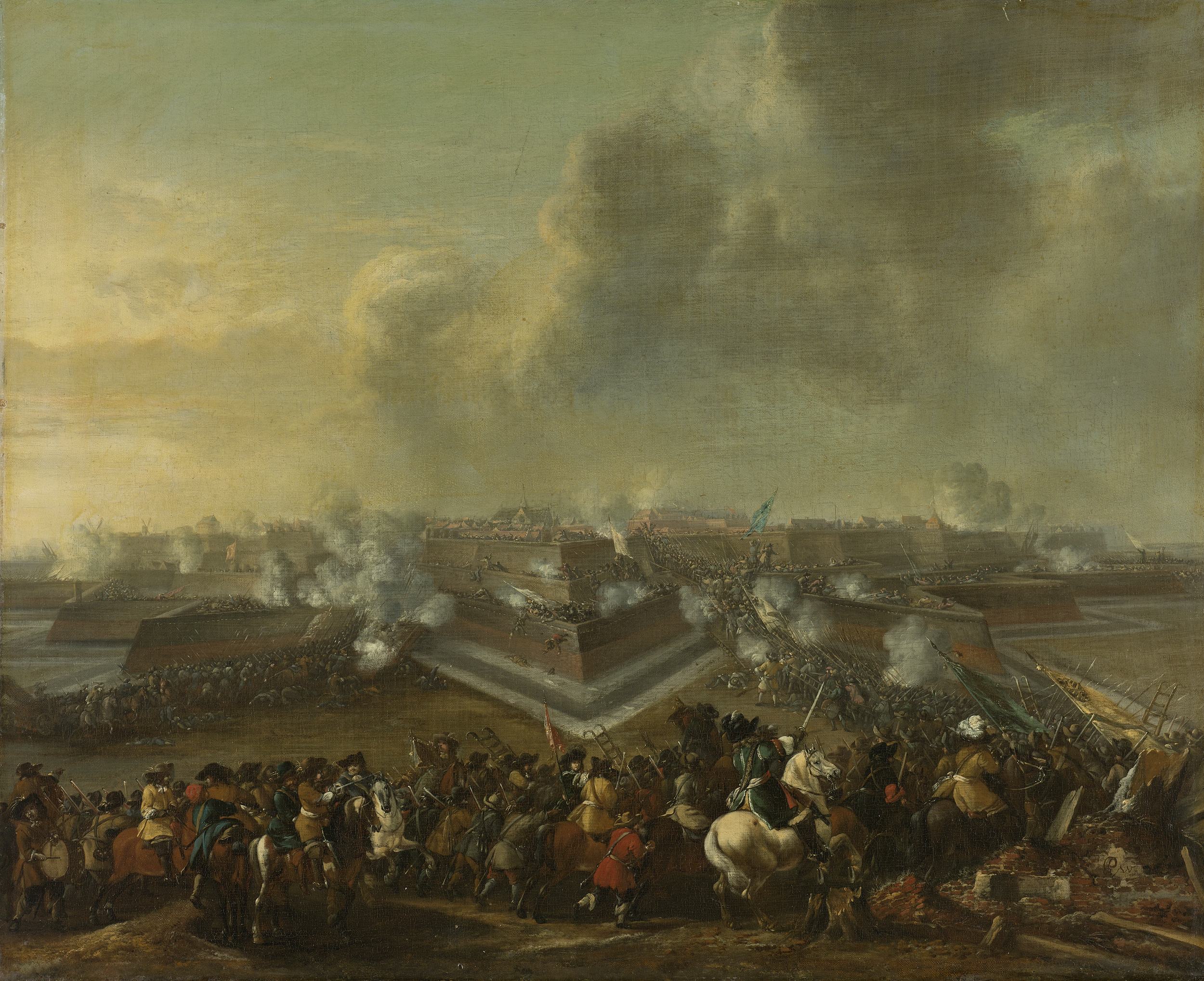
Painting of the capture of Coevorden by Dutch troops in December 1672

- 1672 to 1678 – the Franco-Dutch War

== Births ==
=== Full date unknown ===
- Antoine Augustin Calmet, Benedictine monk (died 1757)

== Deaths ==
- February 17 – Madeleine Béjart, French actress and theatre director (b. 1618)

=== Full date unknown ===
- Jacques Rohault, philosopher, physicist and mathematician (born 1618)
- Pierre Séguier, statesman (born 1588)
- Denis Gaultier, lutenist and composer (born c.1600)
- Tanneguy Le Fèvre, scholar (born 1615)
- Thomas Gobert, priest and composer (born c.1600)
- Antoine Godeau, bishop, poet and exegete (born 1605)
