= 1673 in France =

- Decades: 1650s; 1660s; 1670s; 1680s; 1690s
- See also: History of France; Timeline of French history; List of years in France

Events from the year 1673 in France.

== Incumbents ==
- Monarch – Louis XIV

== Events ==
- 17 May – Jesuit missionary Jacques Marquette joins Louis Jolliet on his expedition to explore the northern Mississippi River.
- 7 June – First Battle of Schooneveld: In a sea battle of the Third Anglo-Dutch War, fought off the Netherlands coast, the Dutch Republic fleet (commanded by Michiel de Ruyter) defeats the allied Anglo-French fleet, commanded by Prince Rupert of the Rhine.
- 14 June – The Dutch fleet again defeats the combined Anglo-French fleet in the Second Battle of Schooneveld.
- 6 July – French troops conquer Maastricht.
- 21 August – Battle of Texel: The Dutch fleet (under de Ruyter) again defeats the combined Anglo-French fleet.
- 30 August – Leopold I, Holy Roman Emperor, Spain, Netherlands and the Lutherans form an anti-French covenant.
- France begins its expedition against Ceylon.

== Arts and literature ==
- 10 February – The première of Molière's comédie-ballet The Imaginary Invalid (Le malade imaginaire) takes place in Paris. During the fourth performance, the playwright, playing the title rôle, collapses on stage, dying soon after.
- 27 April? – Jean-Baptiste Lully's first opera, Cadmus et Hermione, is premièred.

== Births ==
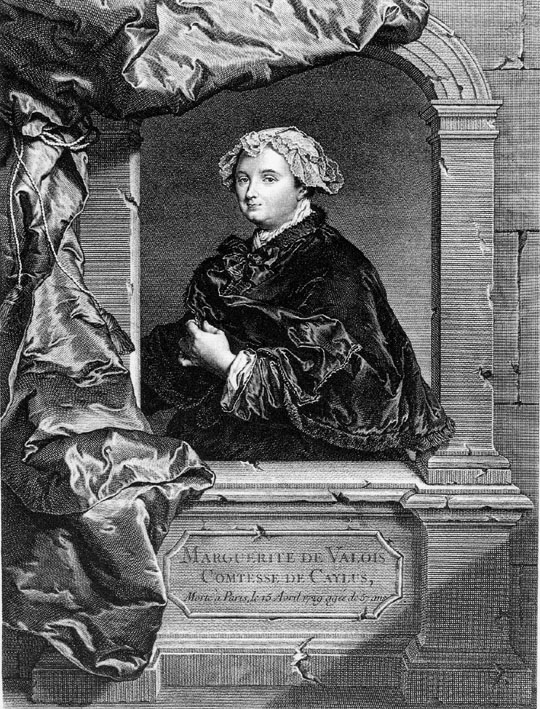
Marthe-Marguerite Le Valois de Villette de Mursay, marquise de Caylus

- Marquise de Caylus, noblewoman (died 1729)

== Deaths ==
- 17 February – Molière, playwright and actor (born 1622)
- 10 March – Henriette de Coligny de La Suze, writer (born 1618)
- 18 June – Jeanne Mance, nurse (born 1606)
- 29 November – Armand de Gramont, Comte de Guiche, nobleman (born 1637)
- 6 December – Guillaume Le Vasseur de Beauplan, cartographer (born c.1600)
