= Michel Poncet de La Rivière =

French clergyman

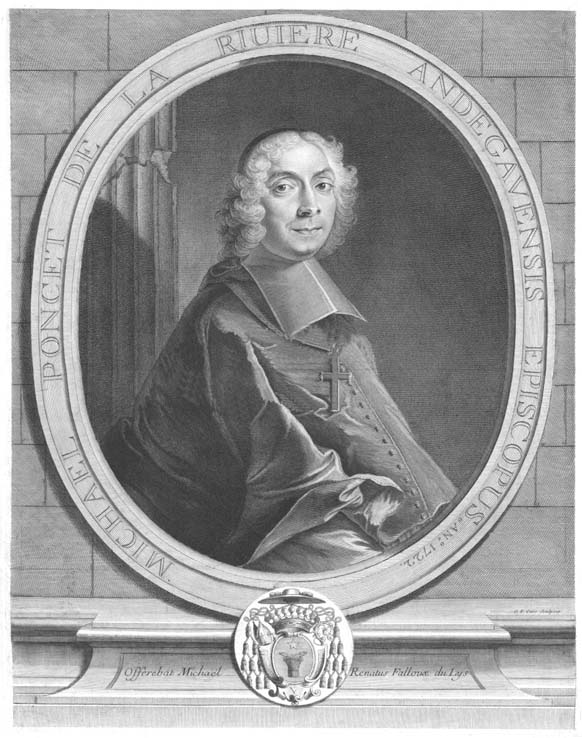
Michel Poncet de la Rivière, the Bishop of Angers, in an engraving by Jean-François Cars

Michel Poncet de la Rivière (11 July 1671 in Strasbourg, France – 2 August 1730 in Château d’Éventard, near Angers, France) was a French clergyman, preacher and, from 1706 to 1730, the 79th bishop of Angers. He was the son of Vincent-Matthias Ponchet de la Riviere, the Lord Lieutenant of Alsace, and his wife, Marie Betauld; the nephew of Michel Poncet de la Rivière, the 61st Bishop of Uzès (1677–1728); the uncle of Mathias Poncet de la Rivière, the 90th Bishop of Troyes (1742–1758); and the cousin of Joseph Poncet de la Rivière, the Jesuit missionary of Canada.

== Early life ==
Michel de la Rivière studied theology at the University of Bourges, where he graduated with a doctorate in 1695. His uncle rewarded him with the appointments as the dean of Navacelles near Uzès and the Vicar General of Uzès in the Cévennes, where young Michel had to deal with the revolt of the Camisards, for which he drew up a proposal for their expulsion. In 1689, he also became the commendatory abbot of the Benedictine abbey of Saint-Pierre in Vierzon and managed to add the post of canon, through régale, in Sarlat. He was ordained as a priest in the next year.

On 7 June 1706, Michel de la Rivière was appointed as the 79th Bishop of Angers. Two months later, on 1 August, he was consecrated in Paris at the Église des Grandes-Jésuits [ Great Church of the Jesuits ] by the Archbishop of Paris, Cardinal de Noailles.

== The Bishop of Angers ==
As the Bishop of Angers, La Rivière was firm and orthodox. He assigned his Vicar General, François Babin, to write the essay, Conferences d’Angers, published in 1716; promoted the Papal bull, Unigenitus, against Jansenism; condemned Les Hexples, ou les six colomnes sur la Constitution Unigenitus, the 1721 collection of six Jansenist essays; denied the appeal from the Benedictines of the five Angevin abbeys; defeated two bishops in a debate at the Assembly of the Clergy in 1725. But he also found the time to dedicate in 1710 l'Église du Bon-Pasteur [ Church of the Good Shepherd ], built on rue Saint-Nicolas [ St. Nicholas Street ] in Angers, for the Soeurs du Bon Pasteur [ not to be confused with the modern Good Shepherd Sisters ], a local community of non-cloistered nuns; and to build, at his own expense, the Chapel of the Calvary, set against the Cathedral, as the shrine of the mission cross. He was also on a shortlist of three clergymen for the post of the preceptor of King Louis XV in 1714 but he did not get the post.

In his youth, before he became famous as an orator, Michel devoted himself to poetry with some success. As an orator, he was considered to be one of the best, along with Jean Baptiste Massillon and Jacques-Bénigne Bossuet. He earned great praise for two speeches he made at the Court – one of them in 1715 during Lent and the other in 1722 for the coronation of King Louis XV – but Saint-Simon felt that La Rivière's skills as an orator were not the equal of these important occasions. A year later, in 1723, his fortunes came to a sudden end. Philippe II, Duke of Orléans, the Regent of France, had just died. His death caused the clergy considerable distress because, in spite his notoriously dissolute lifestyle, his funeral oration would have to be delivered to the pleasure and satisfaction of the King and his Court. La Rivière was chosen for this job. But, during the funeral, when he came to the matter of the salvation of the Duke’s soul, the Bishop blurted, "Je crains; mais j'espere [ I fear but I hope ]". These words were enough to banish him from the Court. However, his oration remains as one of the best funeral sermons ever written in the French language. In fact, d'Alembert declared, "Quand l'évêque d'Angers n'eût écrit que ce peu de mots en toute sa vie, il ne devrait pas être placé dans la classe des orateurs ordinaires [ If the Bishop of Angers had not written these few words, he would be counted only among the ordinary orators ]." It is notable for the following passage:

(in French) "Du pied du plus beau trône du monde il tombe ... dans l'éternité. Mais pourquoi, mon Dieu, après en avoir fait un prodige de talents, n'en feriez-vous pas un prodige de miséricorde?"

(in English) "From the foot of the most beautiful throne of the world he falls ... in eternity. But why, my God, after having made a miracle of talent, have You not done a miracle of mercy?"

== Last years ==
In his retirement, La Rivière was rewarded with the esteem of the men of letters when he was elected as a member of the Académie française in 1728. He was received at the Academy on 10 January 1729 but he was not able to enjoy such an honor for a long time. On 2 August 1730, he died at the Château d’Éventard, in Écouflant, 3 miles (5 km) north of Angers.

La Rivière left only a few speeches, sermons, harangues and parish letters, and a funeral sermon, Oraison funèbre de très-haut, très-puissant et très-excellent prince Mgr Louis, Dauphin, prononcée dans l'église de l'abbaye royale de Saint-Denys, le dix-huitième juin 1711 [ French, Funeral Oration of Most High, Most Perfect and Most Excellent Prince, Msgr. Louis, the Dauphin, delivered at the Church of Saint-Denis, on the Eighteenth of June 1711 ].

Another book, which seems to have been written by the Bishop, or at least by his secretary, appeared in 1721. The literal translation of its Latin title is:

Series of Lessions, of the Breviary of Angers, of the Most Reverend and Illustrious Father in Jesus Christ Don Michel Poncet de la Rivière, Bishop of Angers, Recognized by the Authority and Approval of the Venerable Chapter, Château-Gontier, House of Joseph Gentil, Printer and Bookseller of the Town and College, 1721, by the Privilege of the King.

== Works ==
- Oraison funebre du Cardinal de Bonzi, Archevêque de Narbonne (1704)
- Oraison funebre de Monseigneur Louis Dauphin par Michel Poncet de La Rivière (1711)
- Harangue faite au Roy (30 octobre 1715) Mgr par l'Eveque d'Auxerre (Michel Poncet) pour la cloture du General de l' assemblée clergé (1715)
- Harangue faite Son Altesse Royale Monseigneur le duc d'Orleans, Regent sur sa qualité de du Royaume . Par Monseigneur l'Eveque d'Angers Poncet de La Riviere des autres Accompagné Députez de l' Assemblée du Clergé general . À the Versailles Mardy 3 Septembre 1715 (1715)
- Consolantes fondées Reflexions sur la première pastoral instruction de Mgr le Cardinal de Noailles archevêque de Paris du 14 janv ., 1719 adressées par Mgr Poncet et de la Rivière aux Eveque d'Angers Fideles de son diocèse confirmer pour les dans leur foi (1716)
- Avis aux instructif curés (1717)
- Mgr Poncet de réponse de la Rivière, Eveque d'Angers, à M. Dublinean, doc. en théologie, sur l'appel au futur concile. Communiquée au clergé pour servir d'Anjou au sujet d'instruction dudit appel (1718)
- Mandement de l' Eveque d'Angers (Mic Poncet), portant condamnation d'une thèse soutenue dans la maison de Notre-Dame des Ardilliers de Saumur, 23 et 29 Aoust 1718 (1718)
- Lettre de l' évêque d'Angers (Mich. - Ponc. La Rivière) à M. the Marquis de **** (au sujet des des intrigues appelans). Angers 30 oct. 1720 (1720)
- Lettre de l' évêque d'Angers (Mic P. de la Rivière) à l' Abbé de Claye, (au sujet of a libelle calommieux) . À ce Eventard 7 Aoust 1721 (1721)
- Harangue faite a la Reine, 10 Septembre 1725 à Fontainebleau . Evêque the par Monseigneur d'Angers Poncet de La Riviere (1725)
- Réception et discours de réponse de l' Abbé de Rothelin (1729)

== Bibliography ==
- (in English) Joseph Bergin, Crown, Church, and Episcopate Under Louis XIV (New Haven, Connecticut: Yale University Press, 2004), ISBN 0-300-10356-5, page 466.
- (in French) Jean le Rond d'Alembert, "Eloge de Poncet de la Rivière [ Elegy of Poncet de la Rivière ]", Œuvres Complètes de d’Alembert, Tome Troisième, 1re Partie [ Complete Works of d'Alembert, Third Volume, First Part ], edited by Jean-Antoine-Nicolas de Caritat, Marquis de Condorcet (London: Martin Bossange & Co., 1821), pages 109-111.
- (in French) J[ean]. F[rançois]. Bodin, Recherches historiques sur l' Anjou, Seconde Édition, Tome Second [ Historical Research of Anjou, Second Edition, Second Volume ] (Angers: Cosnier et Lachése, 1847), pages 436-441
- (in French) Jules Candel, Les prédicateurs français dans la première moitié du XVIIIe siècle, de la Régence a l'Encyclopédie (1715–1750) [ The French Preachers in thé First Half of thé 18th Century: The Encyclopedia of the Regency (1715-1750) ] (Paris: Alphonse Picard & Fils, 1904), pages 352-363
- (in French) Jean-Chrétien-Ferdinand Hoefer, Nouvelle biographie générale depuis les temps les plus reculés jusqu'à nos jours : avec les renseignements bibliographiques et l' indication des sources à consulter, Tome Quarantième [ New General Biography, from earliest times to the present, with bibliographic information and details of sources to consult, Volume 40 ] (Paris: Firmin Didot Frères, Fils et Cie, Éditeurs [Firmin Didot Brothers, Son & Co., Publishers], 1862), columns 739 -740
- (in French) Armand Jean, S.J., "79. –- Michel Poncet de la RIVIÈRE", Les évêques et les archévêques de France depuis 1682 jusqu'a 1810 [ The Bishops and Archbishops of France between 1682 and 1810 ] (Paris: Alphonse Picard, 1891), page 427.

Catholic Church titles
Preceded by Michel le Peletier	79th Bishop of Angers; 1706–1730	Succeeded by Jean de Vaugirault
