= Louis Deseschaliers =

Louis Deseschaliers (1663, Montils – after 1713) was a French actor.

An actor in Rouen en 1689, he married Catherine Dudard, an actress born in Paris in 1666. The couple ran the theatre of Lille from 1695 to June 1699, played in Tournai in February 1699 and in Warsaw in 1700 for six months. In Paris, the actor recruited for The Hague, where he became co-director of the theatre with Jean-Jacques Quesnot de La Chênée from 1701. He still played in Mons in 1705.

He retained the theater management in The Hague until 1713, after ousting his co-director and competitor, then finally we lost track of him.

== Bibliography ==
- Jean-Jacques Quesnot de La Chênée: L'Opéra de La Haye. Histoire instructive et galante, Cologne, Héritiers de Pierre Le Sincère, 1706. Imprimé sous l'anonyme (Read online).
- J. Fransen, Les Comédiens français en Hollande au XVIIe et au XVIIIe siècle, Paris, Champion, 1925.
