= Louis Le Pelletier =

Franco-Breton linguist

Dom Louis Le Pelletier (1663, Le Mans – 1733, Landévennec) was a Franco-Breton linguist.

He became a religious in Saumur and followed the rule of Benedict of Nursia. Noted for his ability to study languages, he took advantage of his stay in the Abbaye Saint-Mathieu de Fine-Terre to familiarize himself with the Breton language.

== Publications ==
- Dictionnaire de la Langue Bretonne, où l’on voit son Antiquité, son Affinité avec les anciennes langues, l’Explication de plusieurs passages de l’Ecriture Sainte, et des Auteurs profanes, avec l’Etymologie de plusieurs mots des autres langues. François Delaguette editor, Paris, written in 1716, published in 1752. This dictionary was published under the auspices and at the cost of the Estates of Brittany. He devoted 25 years to the composition of his dictionary, the result of an immense research to which Leon Roussel, whom he called his oracle, collaborated. He compares armoricains words to those in Wales using the Davies dictionary. For the etymology, he cites Hebrew and Ancient Greek words.
