= Jean-Baptiste Perronneau =

French painter (c. 1716 – 1783)

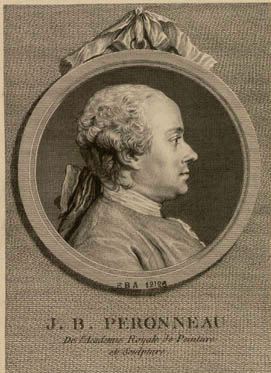
- Bernard-Antoine Nicolet after Charles-Nicolas Cochin, J. B. Peronneau, etching, Beaux-Arts de Paris
- Born: c. 1716; Paris, France
- Died: 19 November 1783 (aged 66–67)
- Occupation: Painter

Jean-Baptiste Perronneau (French pronunciation: [ʒɑ̃ batist pɛʁɔno]; c. 1716 – 19 November 1783) was a French Rococo painter and draughtsman, best known for his portrait pastels.

== Biography ==
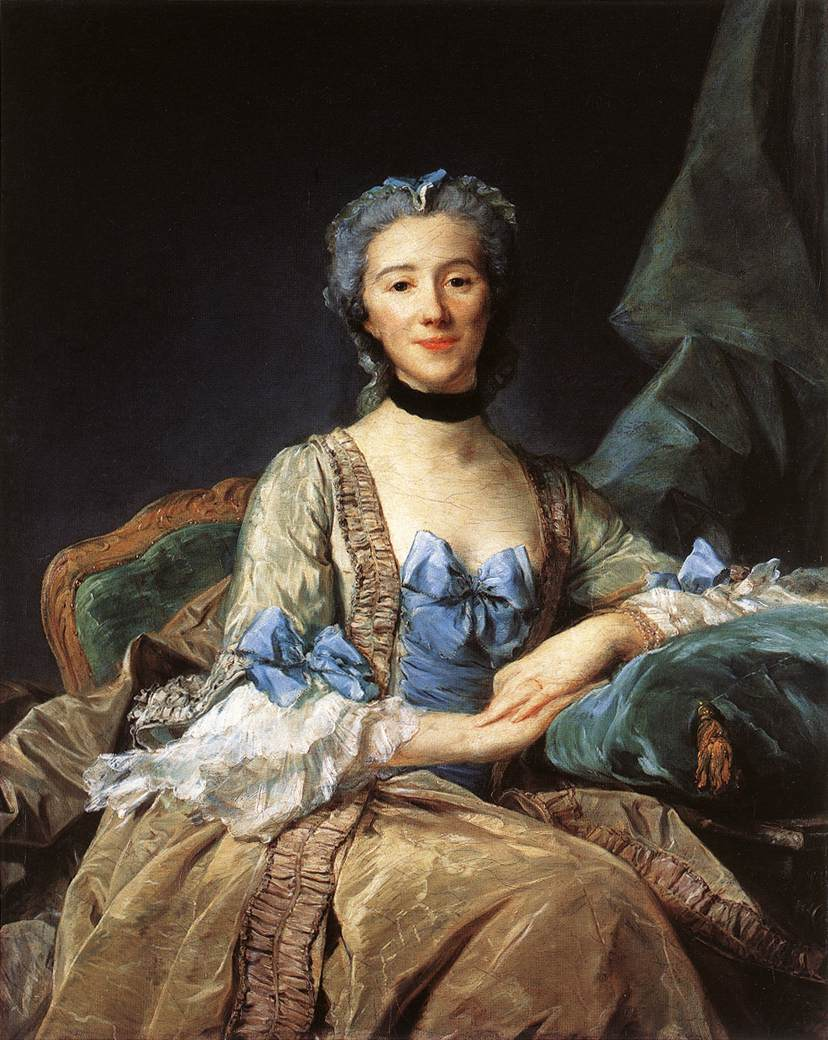
Jean-Baptiste Perronneau, Madame de Sorquainville, 1749

Perronneau was born in Paris. His exact date of birth is unknown, but posthumous accounts suggest that it was around 1716. He began his career as an engraver, apparently studying with Laurent Cars, whose portrait he drew, and working for the entrepreneurial printseller Gabriel Huquier, rue Saint-Jacques, Paris, making his first portraits in oils, and especially in pastels, in the 1740s. His career was much in the shadow of the master of the French pastel portrait, Maurice Quentin de La Tour. In the Salon of 1750, Perronneau exhibited his pastel portrait of Maurice Quentin de la Tour, but found to his dismay that La Tour was exhibiting his own self-portrait, perhaps a malicious confrontation to demonstrate his superiority in the technique. He made his Salon debut with a pastel portrait in 1746 and received full membership in the Académie Royale de Peinture et de Sculpture in 1753, with portraits of fellow artist Jean-Baptiste Oudry and the sculptor Lambert-Sigisbert Adam, both now at the Louvre Museum. After 1779 he no longer exhibited in the Paris Salons, but the clientele in his portraits reveal how widely he travelled in the provinces of France, with a group of sitters connected with Orléans, but also in Toulouse, Bordeaux, and Lyon. Farther afield he may have been in Turin and Rome, and in Spain, Hamburg, Poland, Russia, and England.

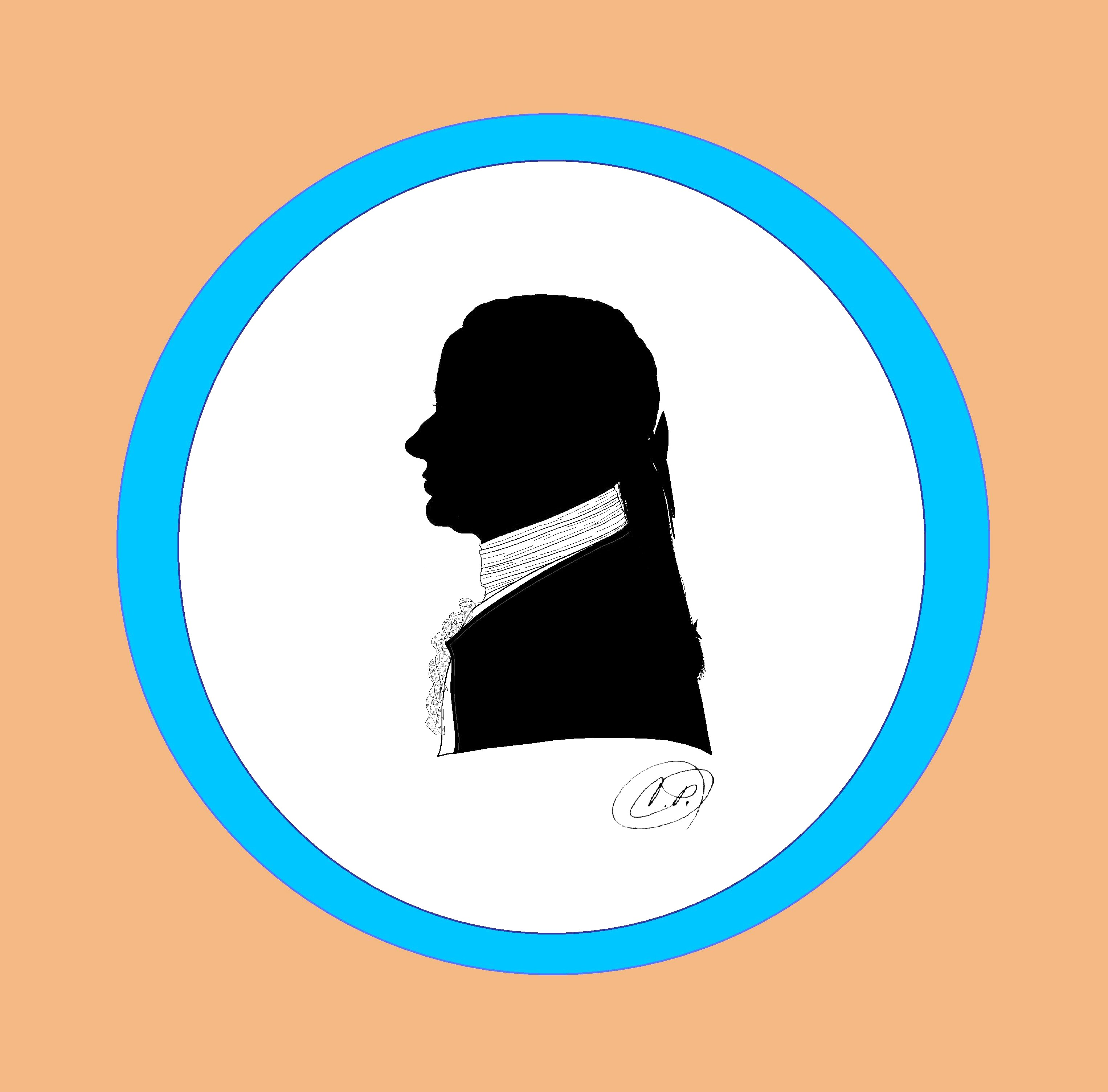
J. B. Perronneau, old fashioned silhoutte style by Carlos Fuentes y Espinosa.

Perronneau produced a varied body of work in which he insists on the psychology of his characters and transmits a little of the spirit of the Enlightenment, as evidenced by the expressiveness of the faces he depicts, the liveliness of the looks, the half-smiles we can watch and guess about. Often close to the harmonies of "camaïeu", his pastels and oils willingly play on monochrome variations: the ochres of the portrait of Mme. de Sorquainville, the grays of Pierre Bouguer, François-Hubert Drouais or Laurent Cars, the blue-grays of the Fillette au chat from the National Gallery in London. Georges Brunel notes that 'Perronneau's pastels always look somewhat unfinished, or weathered by time', and adds: 'Misleading impression, as it is probably a deliberate choice of style and technique. Above all, Perronneau seeks solidity and strength [...].

Unusually for his time, Perronneau also depicts cats in the foreground, that is to say as pets. This is the case for Magdaleine Pinceloup de La Grange, for Mlle Huquier or for the Girl with a Cat (1745) from the National Gallery in London –undoubtedly one of her most famous works-.

=== Perronneau´s works ===
Several portraits of this artist can be found today in various museums or private collections in Europe and America. Although his work is particularly dispersed, the two most important public collections are at the Louvre, in Paris, and at the Musée des Beaux-Arts, in Orléans.

=== Anecdote ===
Perroneau, while in London (1761) testified twice at court during the famous trial of his painter friend, Theódore Gardelle, who had brutally killed and burned his landlady.

Perronneau died in Amsterdam virtually unknown, according to his biographers.
