= Louis Carré (mathematician) =

French mathematician

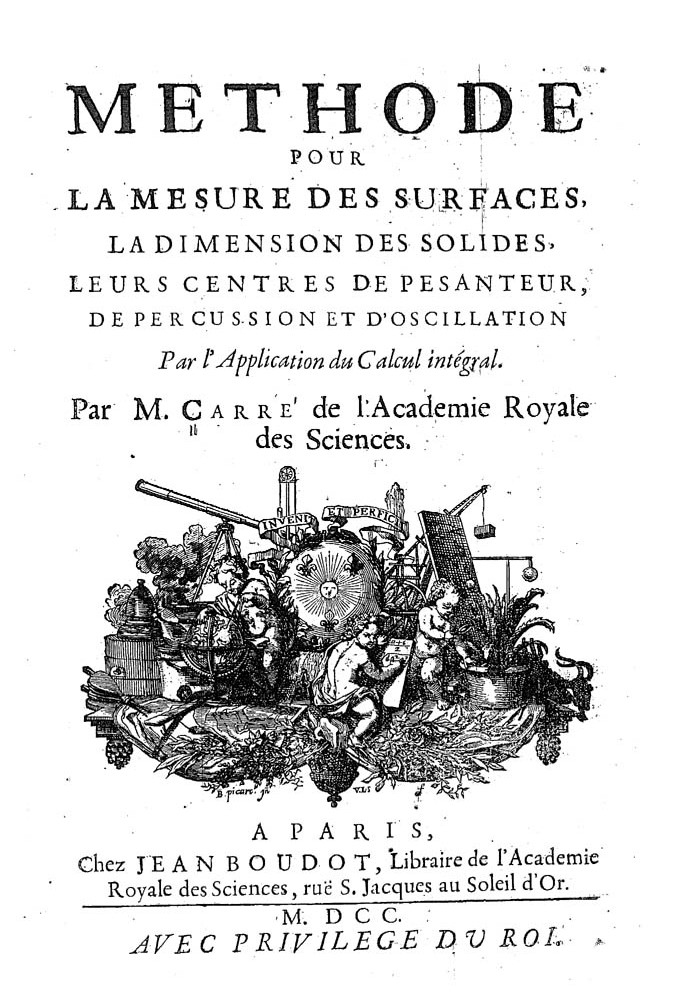
Méthode pour la mesure des surfaces, la dimension des solides, leurs centre de pesanteur, de percussion et d'oscillation, 1700

Louis Carré (French pronunciation: [lwi kaʁe]; 26 July 1663 – 17 April 1711) was a French mathematician and member of the French Academy of Sciences. He was the author of one of the first books on integral calculus.

== Early life ==
Due to his father's wish that he become a priest, Carré studied theology for several years but did not join the priesthood. He took a post as an amanuensis for philosopher Nicolas Malebranche, a mathematics professor at the Congregation of the Oratory, and tutored students as well.

On February 4, 1699, he became a student of Pierre Varignon at the Academy of Sciences. In 1700, his book Une méthode pour Ia mesure des surfaces, la dimension des solides, leurs centres de pesanteur, de percussion, et d'oscillation par l'application du calcul integral was published.

== Publications ==
Between 1701 and 1705, Carré published over a dozen papers on a variety of mathematical and physical subjects:

- Méthode pour la rectification des lignes courbes par les tangentes (1701)
- Solution du problème proposé aux Géomètres dans les mémoires de Trévoux, des mois de Septembre et d'Octobre (1701)
- Réflexions ajoutées par M Carré à la Table des Equations (1701)
- Observation sur la cause de la réfraction de la lumière (1702)
- Pourquoi les marées vont toujours en augmentant depuis Brest jusqu'à Saint-Malo, et en diminuant le long des côtes de Normandie (1702)
- Nombre et noms des instruments de musique (1702)
- Observations sur la vinaigre qui fait rouler de petites pierres sur un plan incline (1703)
- Observation sur la rectification des caustiques par réflexions formées par le cercle, la cycloïde ordinaire, et la parabole, et de leurs développées, avec la mesure des espaces qu'elle renferment (1703)
- Méthode pour la rectification des courbes (1704)
- Observation sur ce qui produit le son (1704)
- Examen d'une courbe formée par le moyen du cercle (1705)
- Expériences physiques sur la réfraction des balles de mousquet dans l'eau, et sur la résistance de ce fluide (1705)
- Problème d'hydrodynamique sur la proportion des tuyaux pour avoir une quantité d'eau déterminée (1705)
