= Institution libre du Sacré-Cœur =

Coordinates: 50°43′22″N 3°08′56″E

Collège de Tourcoing Institution Libre du Sacré-Cœur

Location
- 111, rue de Lille; Tourcoing, Nord; France

Information
- Type: Independent school
- Motto: Timete Dominum et Nihil Aliud (To fear the Lord, and nothing other)
- Religious affiliation: Catholic
- Established: 1666
- Founders: Fathers Recollets
- Headmasters: Bertrand Van Nedervelde and Louis-Marie Tanghe
- Gender: Coeducational
- Age: 11 to 18
- Enrolment: c. 1500 (2007)
- Former Pupils: Association des Anciens Elèves (founded in 1882)
- Website: http://www.sacre-coeur-tourcoing.net/

The Institution Libre du Sacré-Cœur is the oldest and most prestigious school of Tourcoing, next to Lille, France. Its current name is the Collège de Tourcoing (Tourcoing School).

== History ==
This Institution was created in 1666 by the Récollets (a Catholic congregation), with permission from Philip IV, King of Spain, the Lord of Tourcoing, and the bishop of Tournai. It was a free grammar school.

During the French Revolution, the establishment was closed from 1790 to 1802. The First Consul, Napoléon Bonaparte, allowed the Fathers Récollets to come back to Tourcoing.

Tourcoing School, managed by headmaster-priest Albert Lecomte, erected new buildings in Gothic Revival architecture in 1853 and 1885. Since December 1853, the School has been at 111, rue de Lille. The Institution and classrooms are still there.

After several arguments between the headmaster, bishop Henri Leblanc and the city of Tourcoing, about nominations for teachers' jobs, the school ceased to be financed by the city, became an independent school and was renamed "Free Institution of Sacred Heart" on 2 October 1882.

During World War I, German soldiers arrested the headmaster, the priest Achille Leleu, because he protected his students against the requisitions.

The religious staff left the establishment in 1982. The Free Institution of Sacred Heart is still considered one of the best schools in Lille's vicinity.

In 2015, the Free Institution of Sacred Heart is ranked 1st in Nord secondary schools. The success rate at the Baccalaureate was 100%.
