= François Blouet de Camilly =

French Catholic clergyman

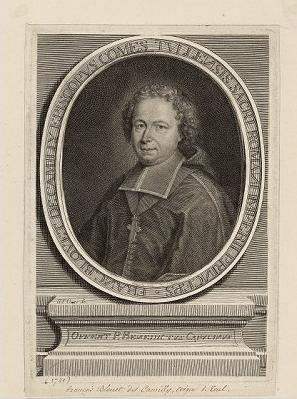
François Blouet de Camilly Bishop of Toul and later Archbishop of Tours, in a 1707 engraving by Jean-François Cars

François Blouet de Camilly, Comte de Saint-Pierre-sur-Dives, D.D., (22 May 1664, Rouen, Normandy, France – 17 October 1723, Ligueil, Touraine, France), a French Catholic clergyman, was the 88th Bishop of Toul from 1706 to 1721 and the 117th Archbishop of Tours from 1721 to 1723.

== Life and career ==
François was born on 22 May 1664 in Rouen, Normandy, France, the son of Augustin Blouet, Seigneur de Camilly, du Fresne, de Cainet et d'Yquelon, a counselor of King Louis XIV and a member of the Parliament of Normandy, and of Catherine Grossin. Although two of his brothers went into the military, François's choice of a career in the Catholic Church was influenced by the examples of his father's brothers and sisters. One of the brothers became a théologal [a teacher of theology at a Cathedral chapter] in Bayeux and another was an archdeacon in Coutances. The third brother, Jean-Jacques Blouet de Camilly (1632–1711), C.J.M., was the 2nd Superior General of the Congregation of Jesus and Mary ("Eudists"), succeeding the founder, St. John Eudes, C.J.M. Two of their sisters both became nuns. So did three of François's own sisters.

With his studies at the Sorbonne in Paris, François graduated with a M. A. in August 1682 and a theological licentiate and a doctorate on 30 September 1692. When he was still at the Sorbonne, he was posted to the Church of Saint-Sulpice, Paris, for two years, beginning in November 1683, and then lived at the Missions Etrangères seminary, also in Paris. He became the commendatory abbot and Comte (Count) de Saint-Pierre-sur-Dives in Normandy on 4 November 1690 but he was not ordained as a priest until 1692. The next year, in 1693, he became the commendatory abbot of the Val Richer Abbey in Saint-Ouen-le-Pin, also in Normandy, with the Cistercian Order, in 1693; and the Grand Vicar of Strasbourg with the Order of Saint Benedict in 1694.

=== The Bishop of Toul ===
On 11 May 1704, by letters patent, Blouet de Camilly was promoted to the ranks of the Bishop and Comte of Toul but he did not assume his authority until 7 September 1705. He was ordained as the Bishop on 12 November 1705 and installed on 13 December 1705.

As the Bishop and Count of Toul, Blouet de Camilly found himself in the controversy over Jansenism, which threatened to send the Catholic Church of France into a schism. Personally a Molinist, he tried to stay in the middle throughout the furore. He favoured the Jansenists in his diocese but he also corresponded with the Archbishop of Cambrai, François Fénelon, who was against the Jansenists. When Pope Clement XI issued his Apostolic constitution, Vineam Domini, in 1705 against Jansenism, the Bishop published it for his diocese as a mild command. In 1713, he was one of the forty bishops who received Unigenitus, the Papal Bull against Jansenism from Pope Clement XI, but he was also the first to withdraw his support.

=== The Archbishop of Tours ===
Nevertheless, on 9 January 1721, again by letters patent, Blouet de Camilly became the Archbishop of Tours. He was the 117th Archbishop of Tours, with the added rank of the Primate of the Catholic Church for the province of Touraine. When Matthieu Marais heard the news, he commented, "grand théologien, mais moliniste, et qui trouve, à Tours, à qui parler [great théologian but a Molinist, and that, in Tours, is the one to talk]".

Saint-Simon added, "Fin Normand de beaucoup d'esprit et d'adresse [ thin Norman of great wit and charm ]".

The promotion might have been engineered by the Duke of Lorraine, Leopold. When François was still the Bishop of Toul, Leopold made several attempts to remove his duchy from the Bishop's authority. He tried to have the Diocese dismembered and its parts given to its neighboring dioceses but the Parliament of Metz would not allow him. Neither would the Bishop and he did not wish to speak to him, either. The Duke then tried to get the help from his brother-in-law, the Regent of France, Philippe II, the Duke of Orléans, but the Regent refused. Then François was given the transfer to Tours.

Blouet de Camilly held his new office from 1721 to 1723. His appointment was finally confirmed on 20 January 1723 and his consecration was performed on 1 May 1723. But his pinnacle was short-lived. He died on 17 October 1723 in Ligueil, Touraine, France, while he was on the tour of his Archdiocese. When his body was brought to Saint-Gatien, his heart and entrails were removed from it and buried in the choir of the St. Martin's Church in Ligueil. His death was blamed by his contemporaries on "the work of his ministry, and indeed he fell ill after he preached and confirmed."

The Archbishop's body was brought to Tours for burial. He left behind his personal library of over 2,211 books. He left behind a house in Liverdun, 9.6 miles (15.5 kilometers) northeast of Toul. As the Bishop of Toul, he had it built to be the official residence of the Bishops of Toul. It is still standing today with the name of "Hôtel de Camilly".

Catholic Church titles
Preceded by Henri-Pons de Thiard de Bissy	88th Bishop of Toul; 1706–1723	Succeeded by Scipion-Jérôme Begon
Preceded by Henri Oswald de la Tour d'Auvergne	117th Archbishop of Tours; 1721–1723	Succeeded by Louis Jacques de Chapte de Rastignac
