= Jacques Adam =

French translator

Jacques Adam (1663 – 12 November 1735) was a French translator.

== Biography ==
Adam was born at Vendôme, where he was a gifted pupil of the Oratory of Saint Philip Neri, he was sent to Paris where, at the age of 14, he assisted Claude Fleury in his research and participated in the production of his classic Histoire ecclésiastique. He became the tutor of the Prince of Conti, and then of his son, who helped him gain membership in the Académie française in 1723.

A scholar of Greek and Hebrew, he translated Athenaeus and also published his works in Greek. In 1712, he also translated Raimondo Montecuccoli's Memorie della guerra from the Italian, helping its author to become better known in Europe. He died in Paris.

D'Alembert said of Jacques Adam:

Adam was one of those academics little suited, in truth, for the public sphere, but all the more so necessary in private discussions, supporting and strengthening our work by the breadth and variety of their knowledge. This class of colleagues serves, among us, as farmers do in our society at large, nourishing and enlivening all the others; they do not play the most brilliant role, but fulfill the most useful role.
