= Gabriel Huquier =

French engraver and printmaker

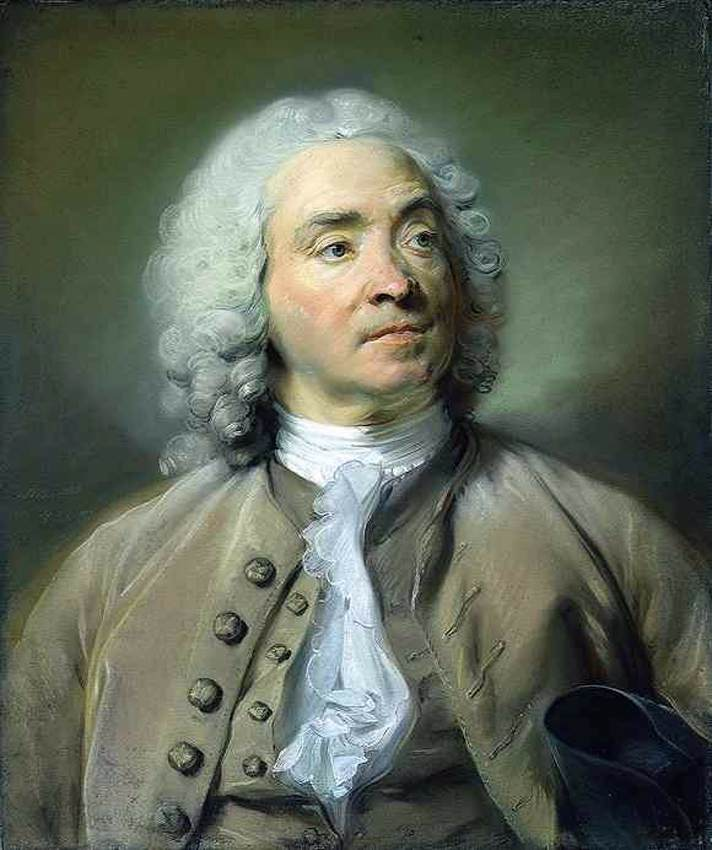
Portrait in pastels by Jean-Baptiste Perronneau.

Gabriel Huquier (1695–1772) was an entrepreneurial French drawer (artist), engraver, printmaker, publisher, and art collector, who became a pivotal figure in the production of French 18th-century ornamental etchings and engravings

== Biography ==
Huquier moved to Paris from Orléans in 1727 and opened a workshop, Aux armes d'Angleterre at rue Saint-Denis in the vicinity of the Grand Châtelet, advertising in the Mercure de France. In 1734, he etched the first print after François Boucher, Andromeda, which was followed by many others. Altogether, Huquier published over eighty of Boucher's prints, including his chinoseries.

Huquier became a prominent engraver and designer of ornament in an advanced Rococo taste, working from about 1731 until his apparent retirement in 1761. He engraved Watteau's designs, interpreting and adapting them so that he became the main source through whom Watteau's ornament was known in the 18th century and went on to etch and engrave designs of Jacques de Lajoue, François Boucher, Gilles-Marie Oppenord, Juste-Aurèle Meissonnier, Alexis Peyrotte, Nicolas Pineau and many other contemporary painters and designers.

Huquier was a collector of works of art, whose collections were dispersed at three great auction sales, in Amsterdam, 1761, in Paris, 1771, and after his death, in Paris, 1772.

== Legacy ==
His son Jacques (or James) Gabriel Huquier (1730–1805) known as Huquier fils, was also an engraver, as well as a portrait painter.

Works by Huquier are held in the collections of the Cooper-Hewitt, National Design Museum, the Science Museum Group, the Fine Arts Museum of San Francisco, the Minneapolis Institute of Art, the University of Michigan Museum of Art, the British Museum, the Metropolitan Museum of Art, and the Harvard Art Museums.
