= Gilles-Marie Oppenordt =

French designer

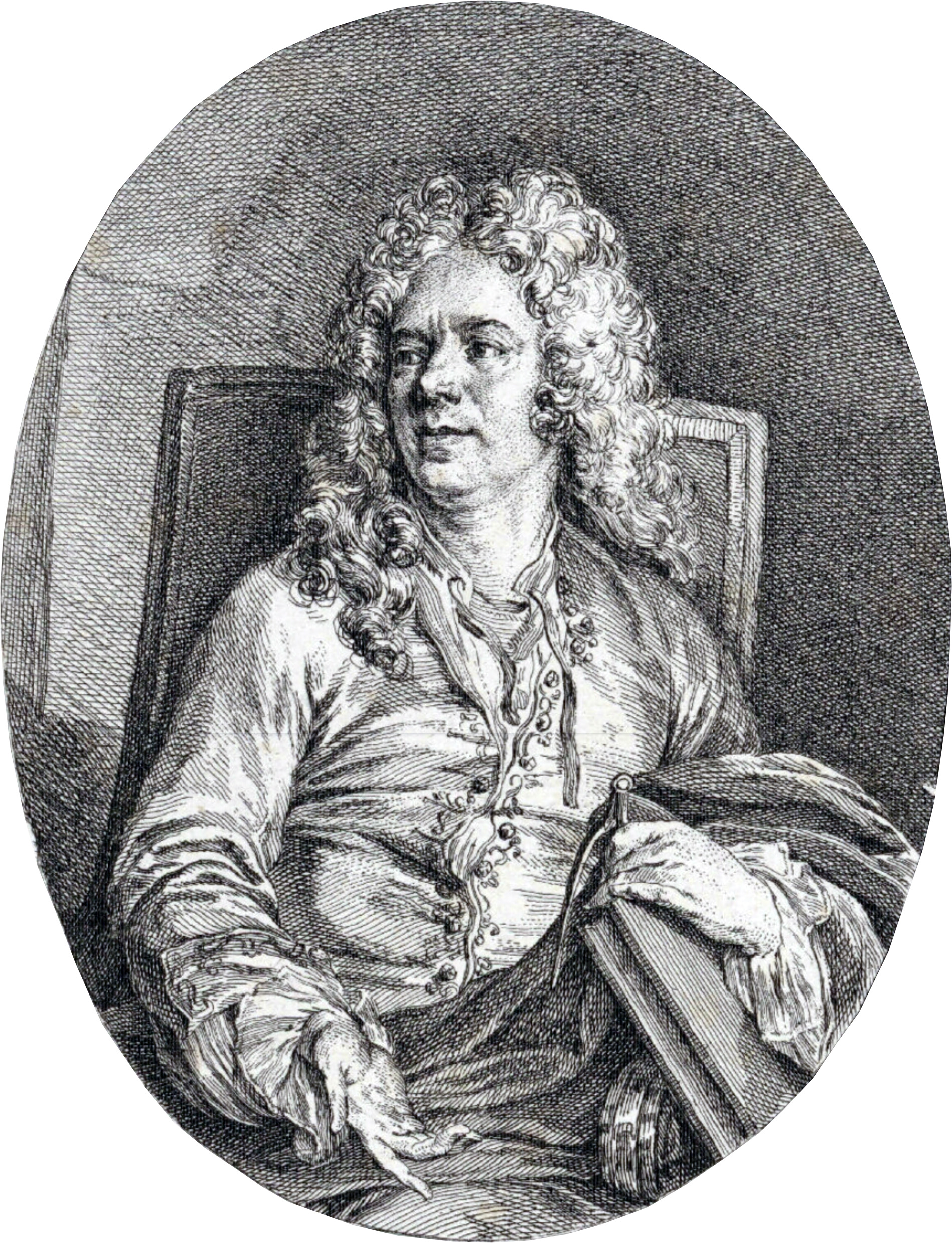
Gilles-Marie Oppenordt

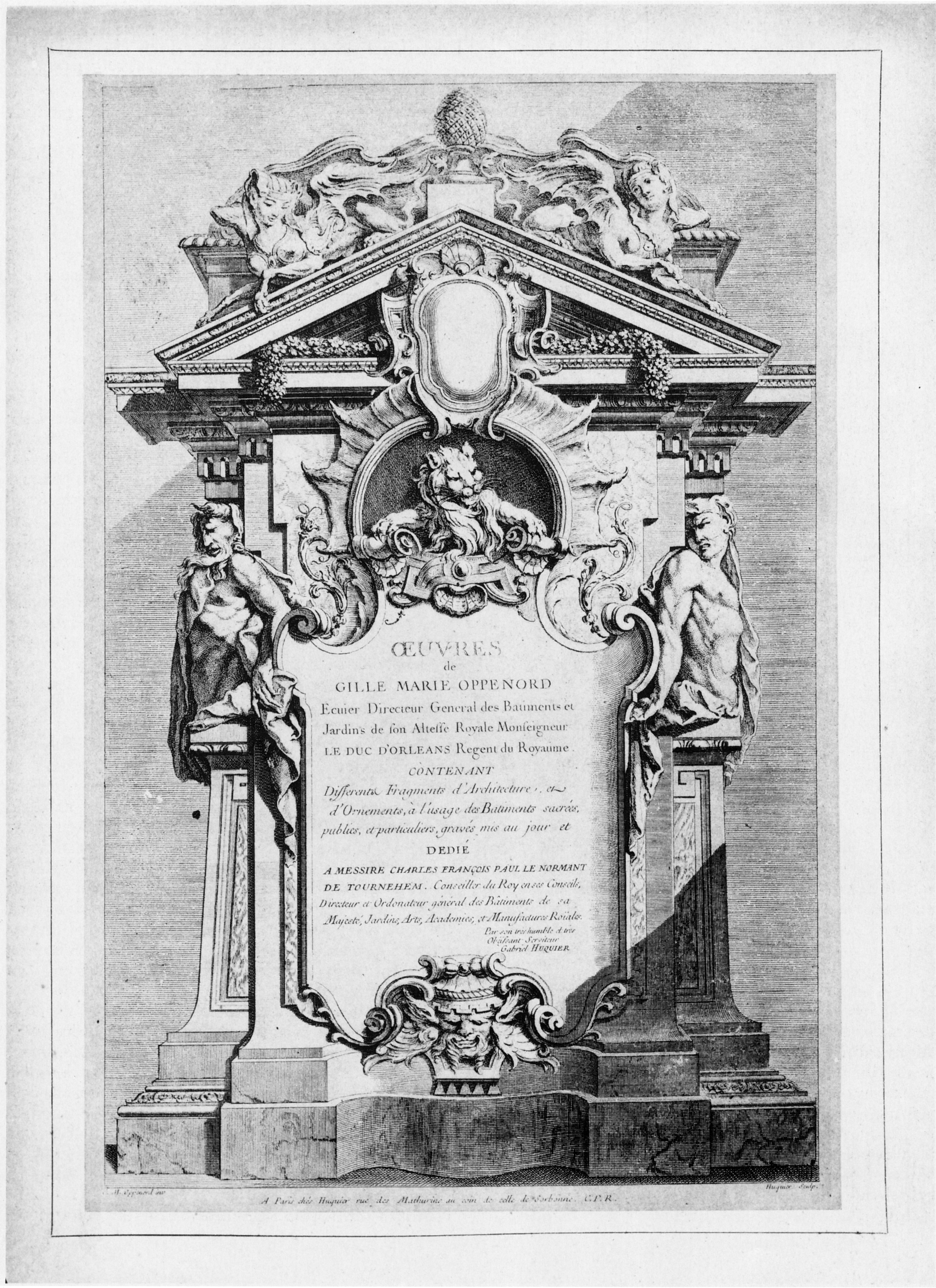
Title page of the Grand Oppenord

Gilles-Marie Oppenordt (French: [ʒil maʁi ɔpənɔʁ]; 27 July 1672 – 13 March 1742) was a celebrated French designer at the Bâtiments du Roi, the French royal works, and one of the initiators of the Rocaille and Rococo styles, nicknamed "the French Borromini". He specialized in interior architecture and decoration, though he has been connected with the furniture of Charles Cressent. His surname has also been spelled Oppenord and Oppenort.

== Biography ==
Gilles-Marie Oppenordt was born in Paris. His father Alexandre-Jean Oppenord (1639–1713) was an ébéniste, born Cander-Johan Oppen Oordt at Guelders, one of numerous cabinet-makers from the Low Countries who were drawn to Paris by the opportunity of patronage; the elder Oppenord was naturalized in 1679, when he was a menuisier en ebène ("furniture-maker in ebony") at the Manufacture Royale des Gobelins; in 1684 the elder Oppenord was appointed an ébéniste du Roi, with official lodgings in the Galeries du Louvre that had been perquisites in the royal gift of outstanding craftsmen in the luxury trades since the time of king Henri IV.

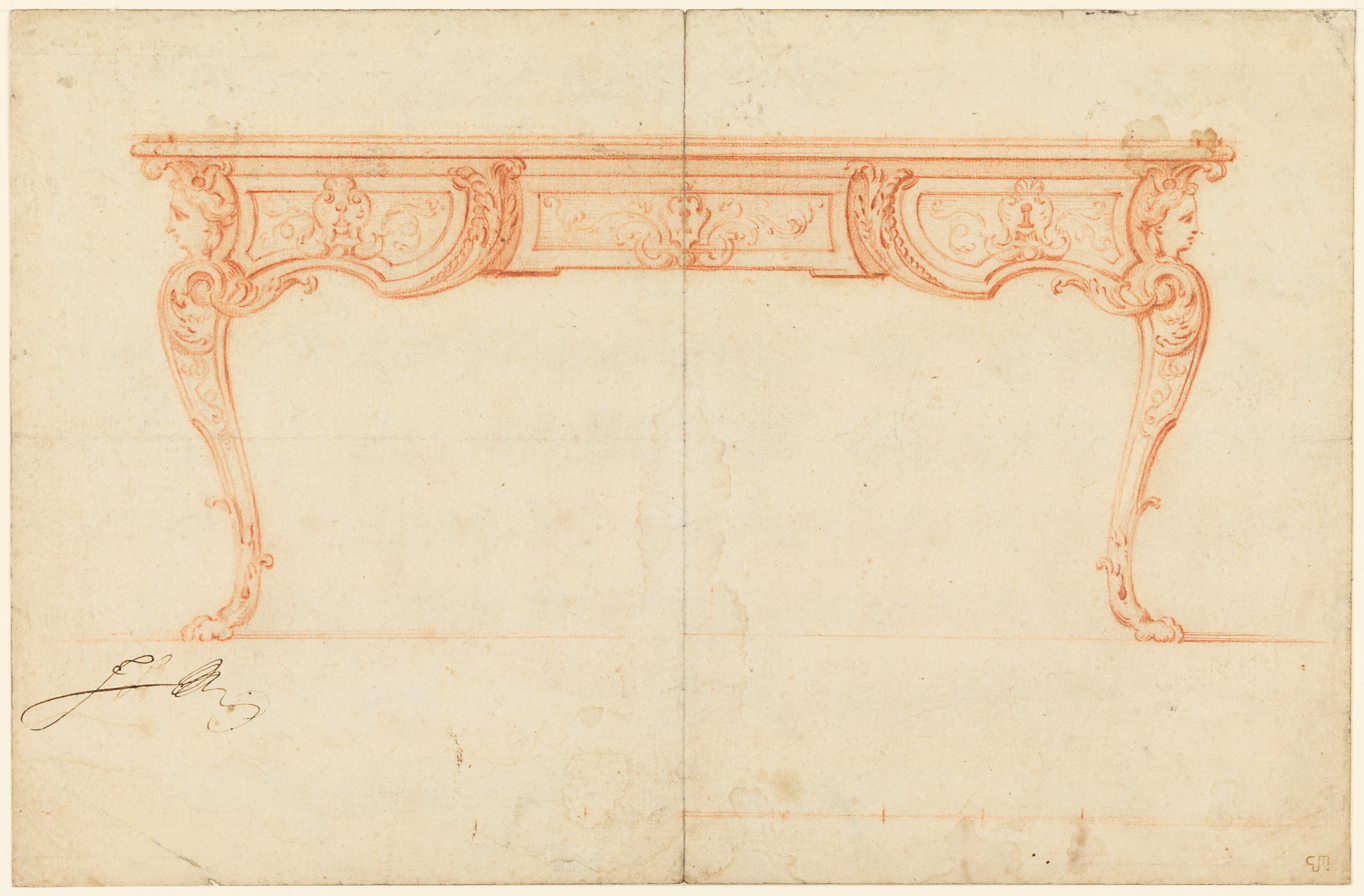
Signed drawing of a writing desk

As a boy Gilles-Marie Oppenord was trained in the studio of Jules Hardouin-Mansart and was sent in 1692 to study as a royal pensioner in Rome for eight years, where he largely ignored the remains of Classical Antiquity and spent his time instead sketching the Baroque sculptural ornaments of the preceding generations, principally those carried out under Bernini and Borromini, and in northern Italy the ornament of Mannerist architects like Pirro Ligorio. Three notebooks of his youthful drawings survive.

On his return to France in 1699 he failed to secure a post in the Bâtiments du Roi. His only known early commissions, for the high altar (demolished) for Saint Germain des Prés, Paris and that of Saint-Sulpice (1704), gained for him the favour of the duc d'Orléans, soon to become Regent: in the year his father died (1713) he was listed as premier architecte of the duke. He remained an outsider, never taken into the Académie, but found private commissions, such as the engravings of the collection of the sculptor François Girardon (1710) while he added to his notebooks details of the most advanced recent French decorations, gaining fluency in the French idiom.

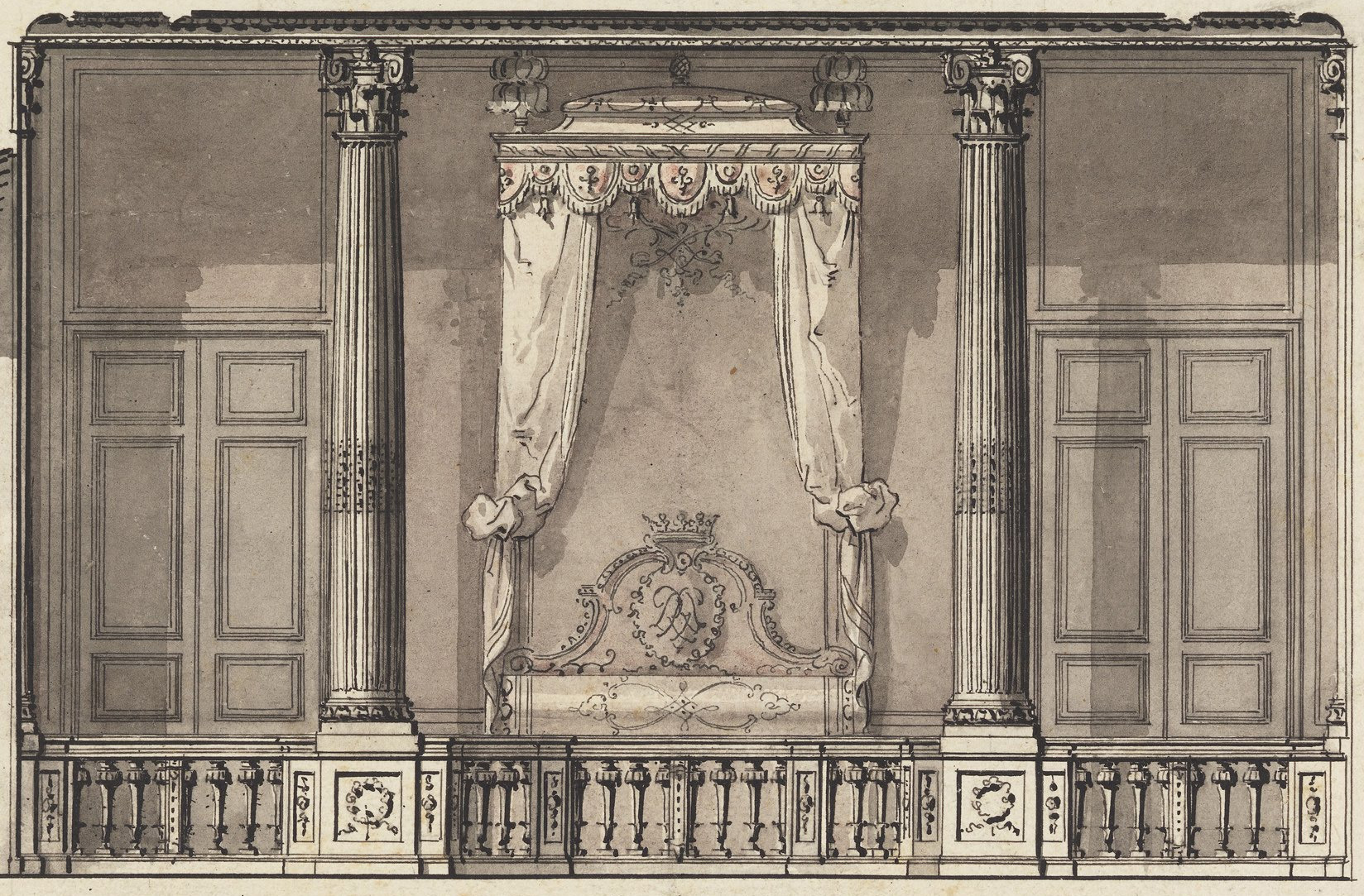
Palais-Royal. Preliminary design (c. 1716) for a bed alcove

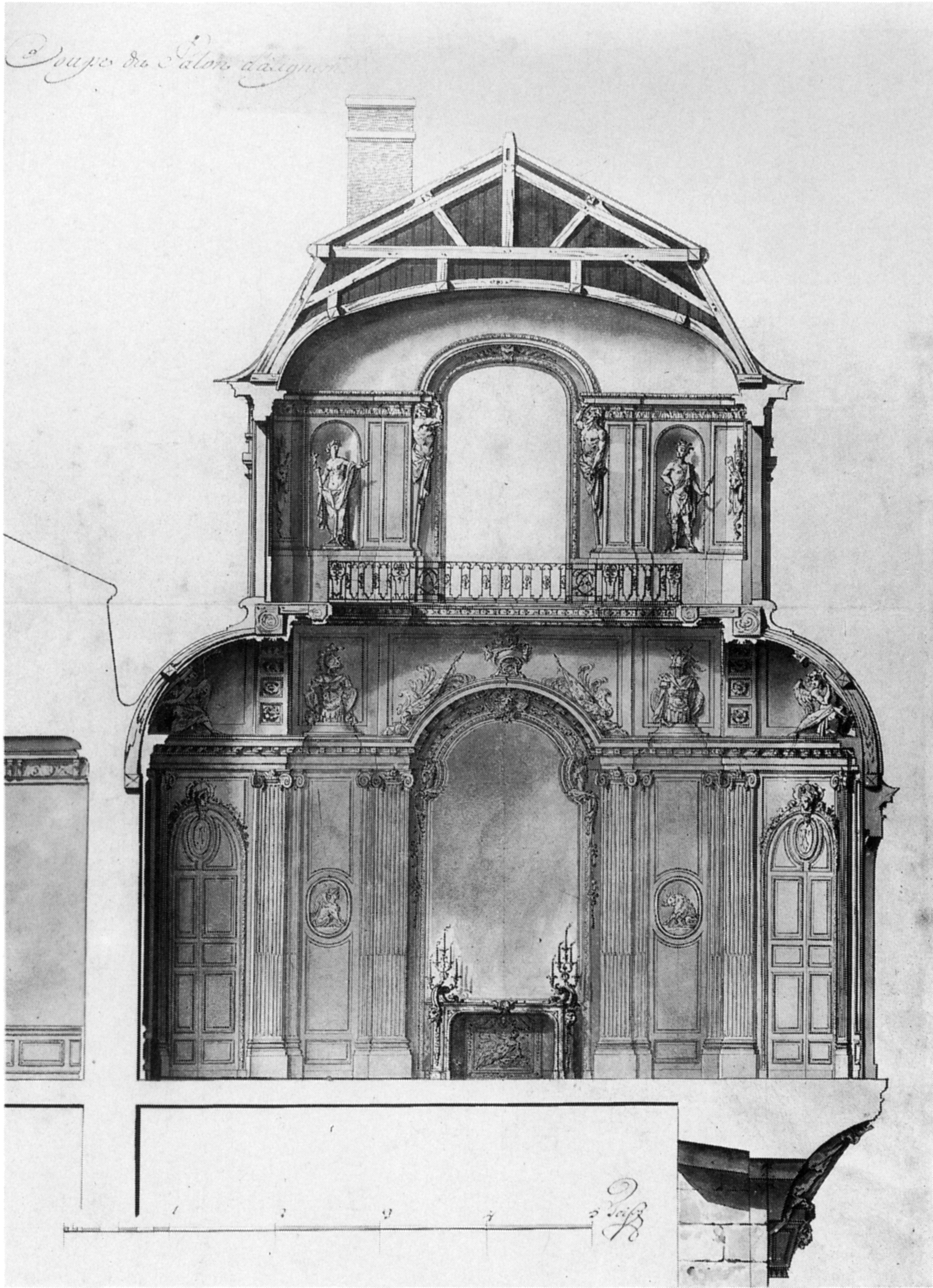
Palais-Royal. Preliminary design (c. 1719–1720) for the Salon d'Angle (demolished c. 1784)

Oppenordt, along with designers working officially for Robert de Cotte, developed the voluptuous rocaille border and shell ornamentation, founded on the Italian Grotesque, that had been developed by Jean Bérain. His earliest known commission to design interiors was at the Hôtel de Pomponne in Place des Victoires, Paris (1714). He was entrusted with the restoration and decoration of the Château de Villers Cotterets, for the reception of the king after his anointing at Reims (1723). In the Palais Royal and the Hôtel du Grand Prieur de France he proved himself an elegant decorator. In 1721 the continuation of the work on Saint-Sulpice was transferred to him. He had already built (in 1710) the chapel of St. John the Baptist in the cathedral of Amiens and earlier the Dominican novitiate church in Paris.

He also possessed unusual talent as a draughtsman. Two books of his engraved designs were published, called by connoisseurs the Grand Oppenord and the Petit Oppenord. In his Dessins, couronnements et amortissements convenables pour dessus de porte etc., Gabriel Huquier engraved many of Oppenordt's designs.

He died in Paris in 1742.

== Notes ==
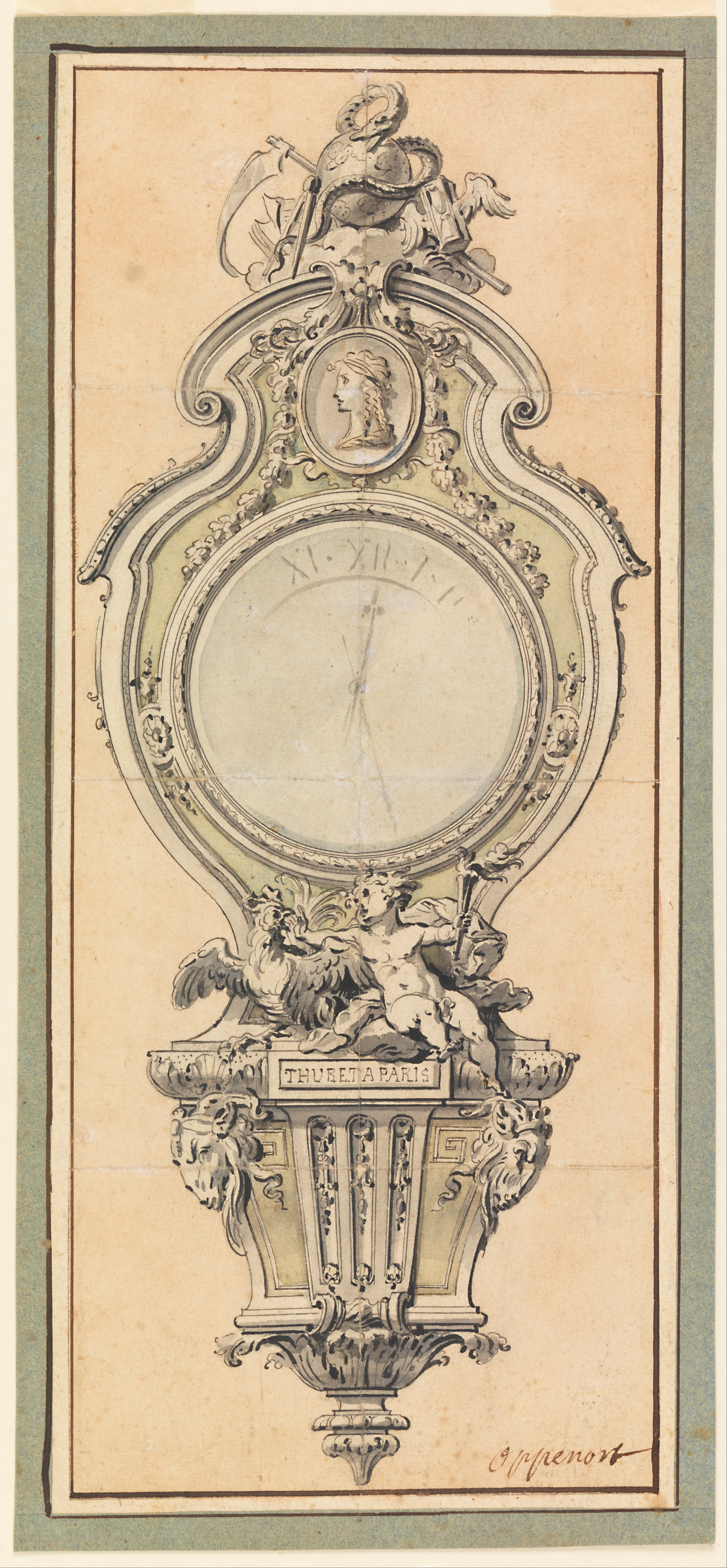
Design for a clock case

== Bibliography ==
- Bédard, Jean-François (2009). "Political Renewal and Architectural Revival during the French Regency: Oppenord's Palais- Royal", Journal of the Society of Architectural Historians, vol. 68, no. 1 (March), pp. 30–51. JSTOR 10.1525/jsah.2009.68.1.30 .
- Connors, Joseph (1996). "Borromini in Oppenord's Sketchbooks", in Ars naturam adiuvans. Festschrift für Matthias Winner. Mainz am Rhein: Philipp von Zabern, pp. 598–612.
- Dee, Elaine Evans (1996). "Oppenord [Oppenordt], Gilles-Marie", vol. 23, pp. 457–459, in The Dictionary of Art, 34 volumes, edited by Jane Turner, reprinted with minor corrections in 1998. New York: Grove. ISBN 9781884446009. Also at Oxford Art Online (bibliography updated 15 July 2008; subscription required).
- Dell, Theodore (1992). The Frick Collection: V. Furniture. Italian & French. New York. ISBN 9780691038674.
- Destailleur, Hippolyte (1863). Recueil d'estampes. Paris. Idem, Notices sur quelques artistes français Paris. Copy at the Internet Archive.
- Gietmann, Gerhard (1911). "Oppenordt (Oppenord), Gilles-Marie", vol. 11, pp. 261–262, in The Catholic Encyclopedia. New York: The Encyclopedia Press.
- Kimball, Fiske (1943). The Creation of the Rococo. Philadelphia Museum of Art. OCLC 2892380. 1980 Dover reprint: ISBN 9780486239897.
- Lance, Adolphe (1873). "Oppenordt ou Oppen Oordt (Gilles-Marie)", vol. 2., pp. 173–174, in Dictionnaire des architectes français, 2 volumes. Paris: Morel. Vols 1 and 2 at the Internet Archive.
