= 1653 in France =

- Decades: 1630s; 1640s; 1650s; 1660s; 1670s
- See also: History of France; Timeline of French history; List of years in France

Events from the year 1653 in France.

== Incumbents ==
- Monarch: Louis XIV

== Events ==
- 3 February – Cardinal Mazarin returns to Paris from exile.
- Petite post, a system of postage using prepaid labels and post boxes, is introduced in Paris by Jean-Jacques Renouard de Villayer.
- Madeleine de Scudéry and her friend, the lutenist Mlle Bocquet, launch a salon.
- Jean-Baptiste Boësset and Jean-Baptiste Lully start their collaboration to produce ballets de cour
- Blaise Pascal publishes his Traité du triangle arithmétique in which he describes Pascal's triangle; and his Traités de l’équilibre des liqueurs in which he explains Pascal's law.

== Births ==
- 24 January – Dom Jacques Alexandre, Benedictine (d. 1734)
- 1 March – Jean-Baptiste-Henri de Valincour, classical scholar (d. 1730)
- 24 March – Joseph Sauveur, mathematician (d. 1716)
- 8 May – Claude Louis Hector de Villars, Marshal of France (d. 1734)
- 10 August – Louis-Guillaume Pécour, dancer and choreographer (d. 1729)
- 8 October – Michel Baron, actor (d. 1729)
- 20 October – Charles-François Poerson, painter (d. 1725)

=== Full date unknown ===
- Sébastien Barras, painter and engraver (d. 1703)
- Jacques-Philippe Ferrand, miniaturist and painter in enamel (d. 1732)
- Nicolas Fouché, painter (d. 1733)

== Deaths ==
- 10 July – Gabriel Naudé, librarian and scholar (b. 1600)
- 26 June – Juliana Morell, Dominican nun and scholar (b. 1594 in Spain)
- 3 September – Claudius Salmasius, classical scholar (b. 1588)
- 23 September – Jacques Goar, Hellenist (b. 1601)
- 26 September – Charles de l'Aubespine, marquis de Châteauneuf, diplomat and government official (b. 1580)
