= 1657 in France =

- Decades: 1630s; 1640s; 1650s; 1660s; 1670s
- See also: History of France; Timeline of French history; List of years in France

Events from the year 1657 in France.

== Incumbents ==
- Monarch – Louis XIV

== Events ==
- March – The Treaty of Paris allied the English Protectorate of Oliver Cromwell with King Louis XIV of France against King Philip IV of Spain.
- The 54th Infantry Regiment was formed.

== Births ==
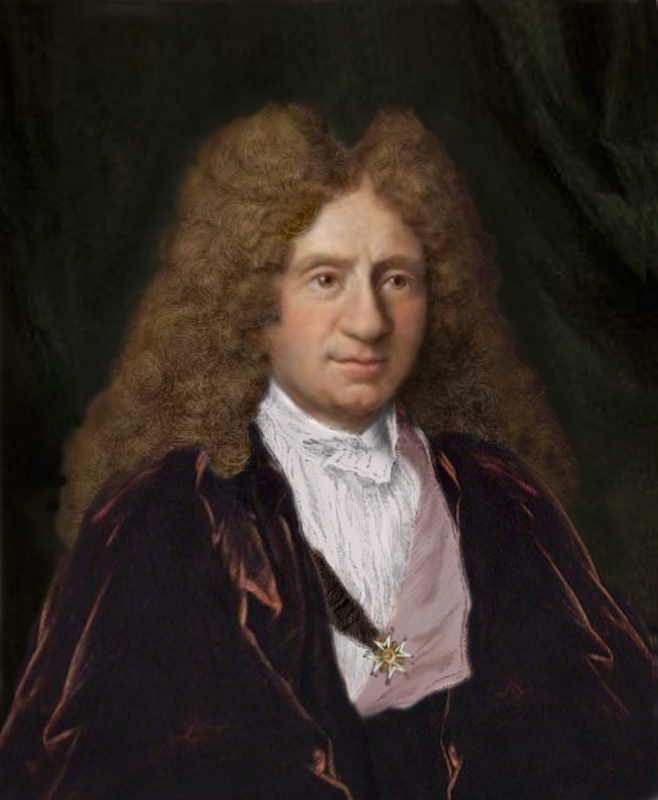
Michel Richard Delalande

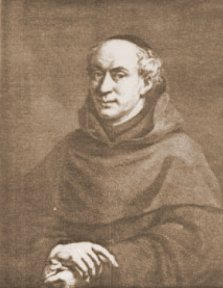
Sébastien Truchet

- 11 February – Bernard Le Bovier de Fontenelle, writer (d. 1757)
- 25 May – Henri-Pons de Thiard de Bissy, bishop and cardinal (d. 1737)
- 16 June – Louis Ellies Dupin, ecclesiastical historian (d. 1719)
- 24 July – Jean Mathieu de Chazelles, hydrographer (d. 1710)
- 7 August – Henri Basnage de Beauval, Huguenot historian, lexicographer and journal editor (d. 1710)
- 9 August – Pierre-Étienne Monnot, sculptor (d. 1733)
- 15 December – Michel Richard Delalande, composer and organist (d. 1726)

=== Full date unknown ===
- Jean-François de Chamillart, churchman (d. 1714)
- Anne Ferrand, writer (d. 1740)
- Pierre-Charles Le Sueur, fur trader and explorer (d. 1704)
- Jean-Baptiste Nolin, cartographer and engraver (d. 1708)
- Jacques Savary des Brûlons, lexicographer (d. 1716)
- Sébastien Truchet, Dominican priest, scientist and inventor (d. 1729)

== Deaths ==
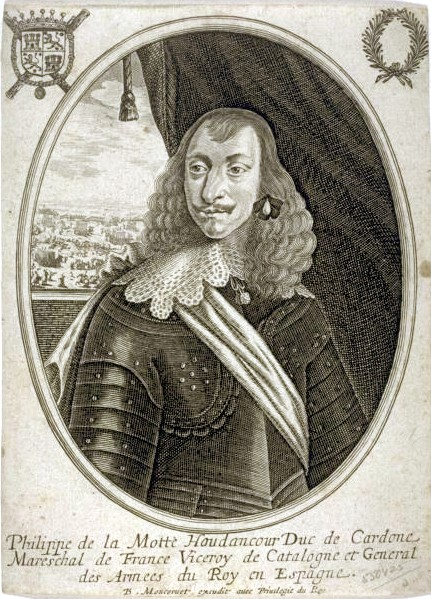
Philippe de La Mothe-Houdancourt

- 19 February – Jean Riolan the Younger, anatomist (b. 1577 or 1580)
- 24 March – Philippe de La Mothe-Houdancourt, count and marshal (b. 1605)
- 24 December – Philippe Le Sueur de Petiville, poet (b. 1607)

=== Full date unknown ===
- Pompone de Bellièvre, magistrate, ambassador and statesman (b. 1606)
- Françoise de Lansac, courtier (b. 1582)
