= 1655 in France =

- Decades: 1630s; 1640s; 1650s; 1660s; 1670s
- See also: History of France; Timeline of French history; List of years in France

Events from the year 1655 in France.

== Incumbents ==
- Monarch – Louis XIV

== Events ==
- The French army under Turenne took Landrecies after a siege in 14 July, and the towns of Condé and Saint-Ghislain, on 18 and 25 August.

== Births ==
- 14 February – Jacques-Nicolas Colbert, churchman (died 1707)
- 30 September – Charles III, Prince of Guéméné, nobleman (died 1727)
- 4 October – Lothar Franz von Schönborn, archbishop (died 1729)

== Deaths ==
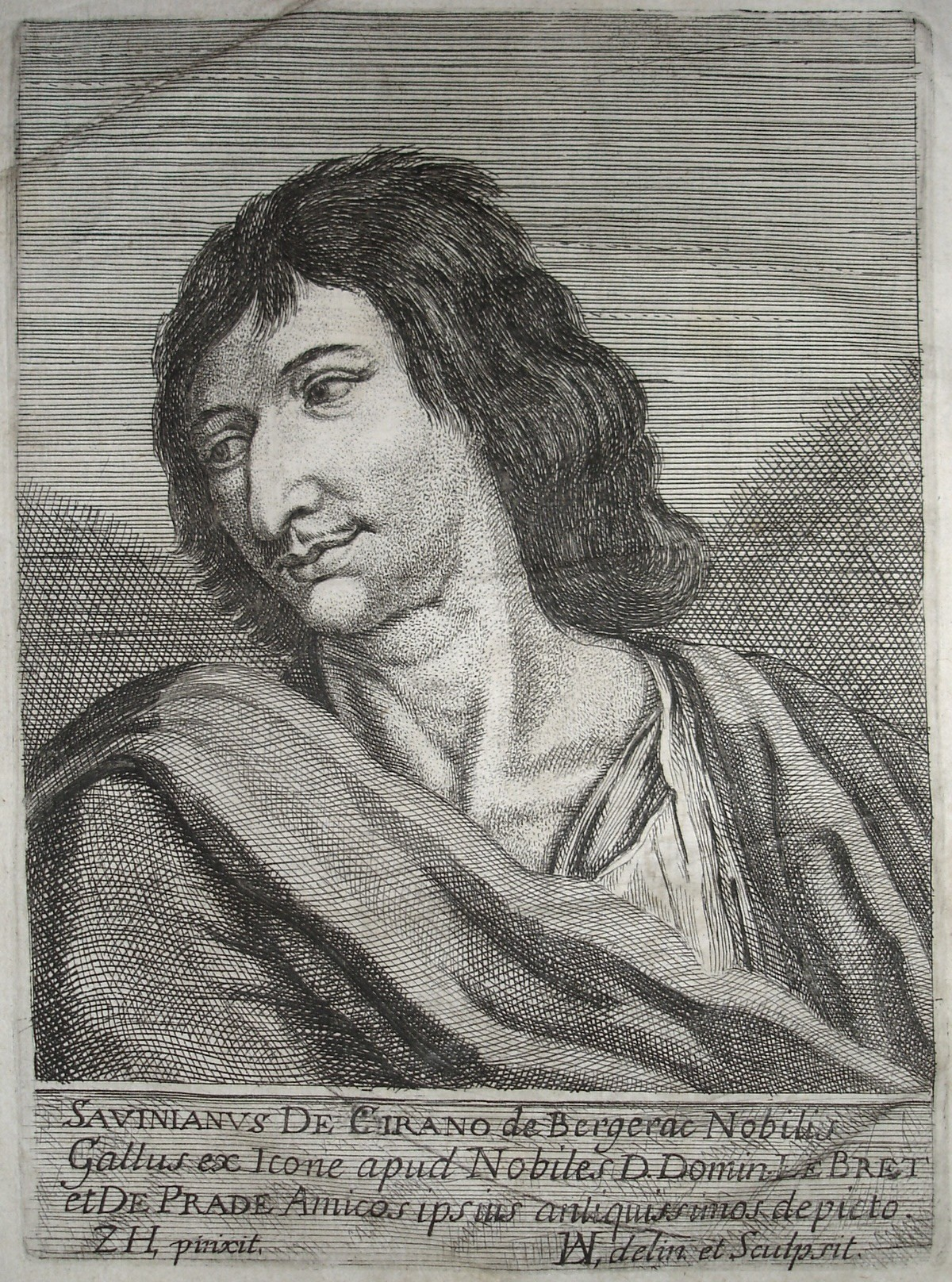
Cyrano de Bergerac

- 27 February – Henri Chabot, nobleman (born 1616)
- 6 April – David Blondel, clergyman, historian and classical scholar (born 1591)
- 28 July – Cyrano de Bergerac, novelist and playwright, (born 1619)
- 7 September – François Tristan l'Hermite, dramatist (born c.1601)
- 24 October – Pierre Gassendi, philosopher, priest, scientist, astronomer and mathematician (born 1592)
