= Jean-Baptiste Nolin =

French cartographer and engraver

Jean-Baptiste Nolin (French pronunciation: [ʒɑ̃ batist nɔlɛ̃]; c. 1657–1708) was a French cartographer and engraver.

== Life and career ==
Jean-Baptiste Nolin was born c. 1657. He trained with the engraver François de Poilly, which caught the attention of the Italian cartographer Vincenzo Coronelli, who invited him to engrave his own maps. In 1694 Nolin was named geographer to Philippe I, Duke of Orléans, and in 1701 he was named engraver to King Louis XIV. Nolin set up a family publishing house on Rue Saint-Jacques, Paris, which was initially unsuccessful until it was moved nearer to other geographers on Quai de l'Horloge. Many of Nolin's maps were based on previous works by Coronelli and the amateur geographer Jean-Nicholas de Tralage, known as Sieur de Tillemon, who supplied him with most of his material.

In 1700, Nolin published Le Globe Terreste, a 125×140 cm world map. He was subsequently accused of plagiarism by Claude Delisle, the father of Guillaume Delisle, another cartographer. Claude accused Nolin of copying both the shape of California (depicting it as a peninsula rather than an island) and the mouth of the Mississippi River from a manuscript globe by Guillaume, which he had been working on since 1697 for Louis Boucherat, the chancellor of France. Nolin denied these accusations. Eventually, both Nolin and Guillaume were compelled to present their respective maps before a panel of experts, and to explain their sources for them. Nolin argued that the information he had used for his map was in the public domain, but the panel ruled in the Delisles' favour. Nolin was ordered to stop producing his map. The entire case took six years.

Nolin's son, also named Jean-Baptiste Nolin (1686–1762), took over the business upon his father's death. Jean-Baptiste the younger produced an atlas that was published posthumously in 1783, 21 years after his death.

== Gallery ==
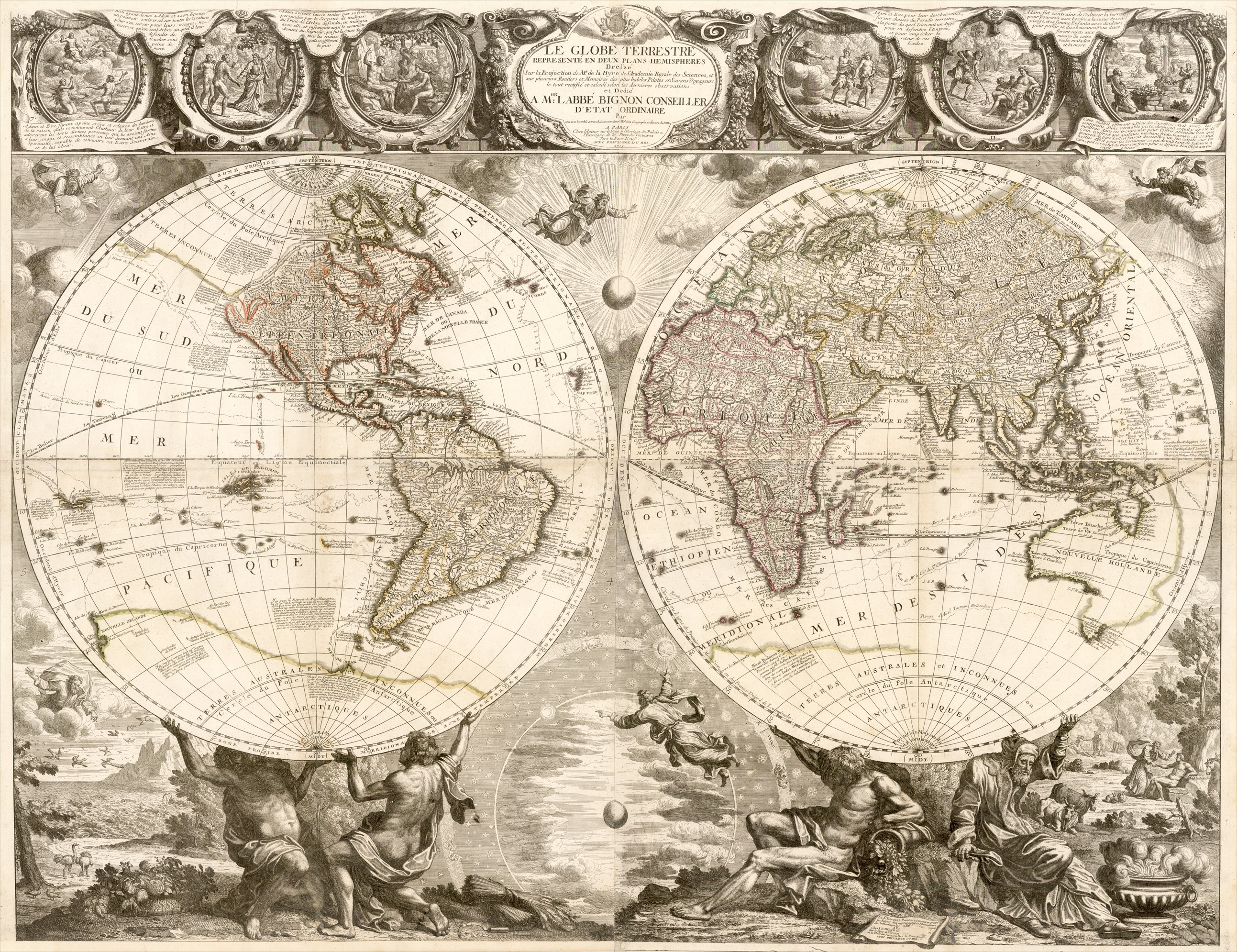
Le Globe Terreste

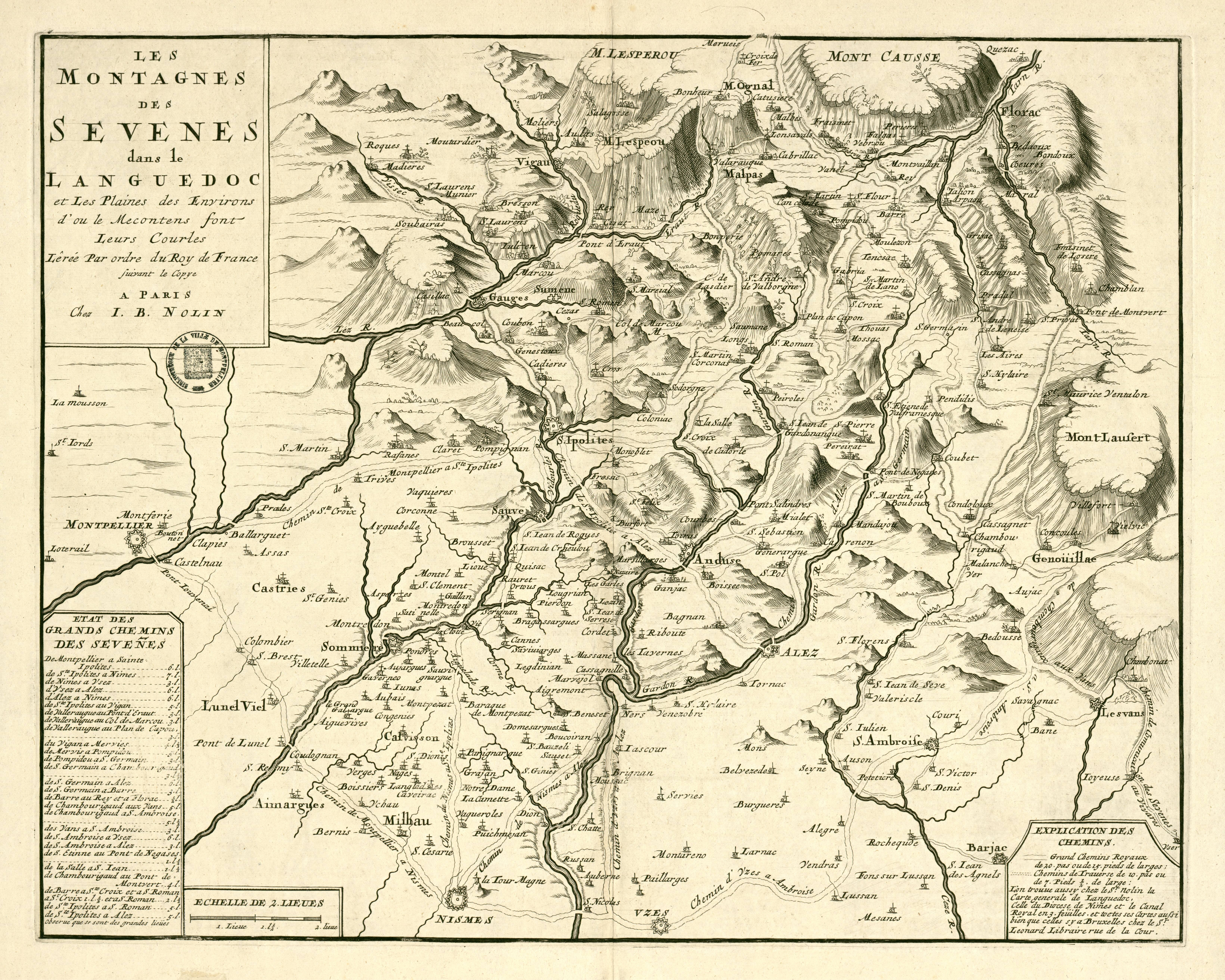
Les Montagnes des Sevenes dans le Languedoc

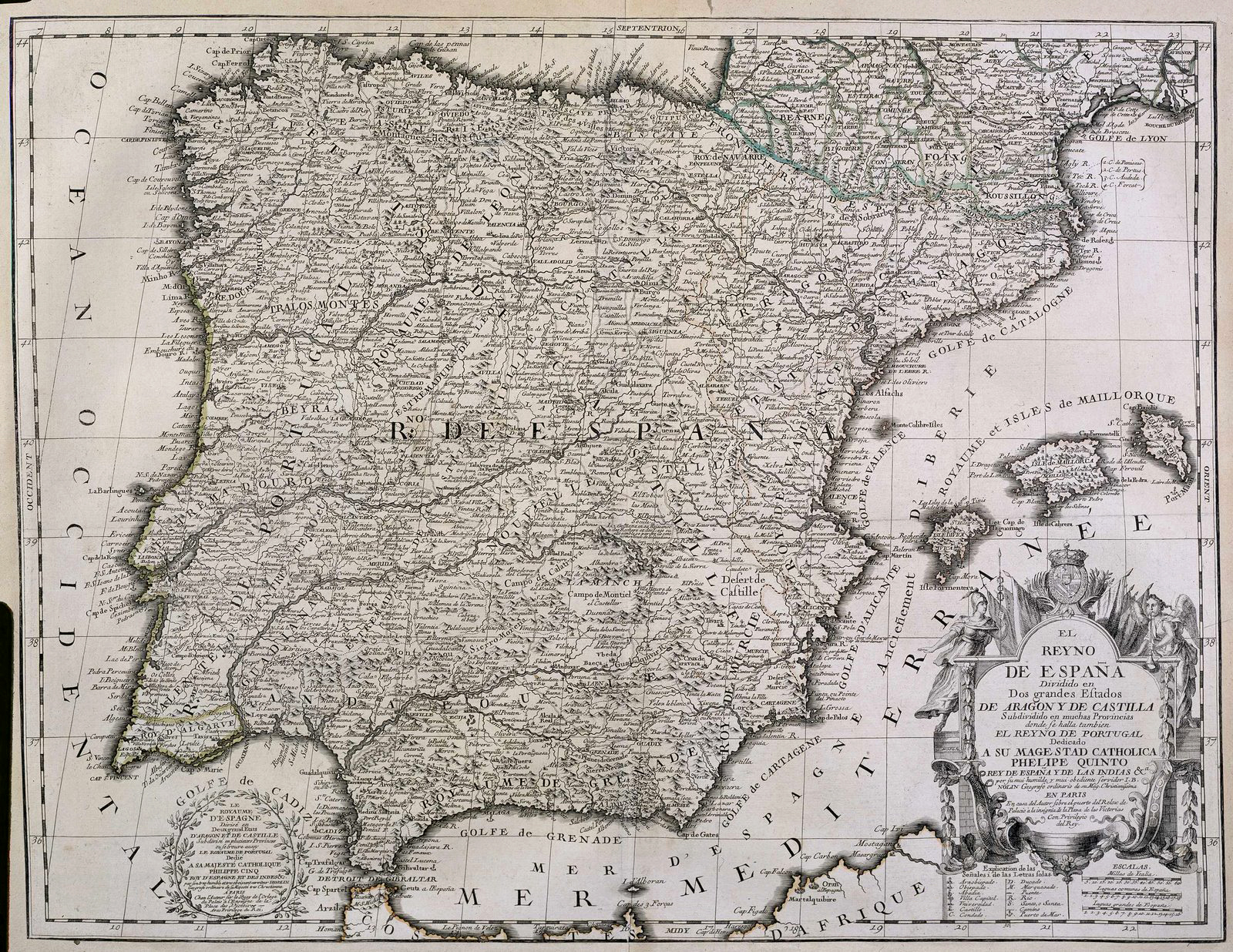
El Reyno de España

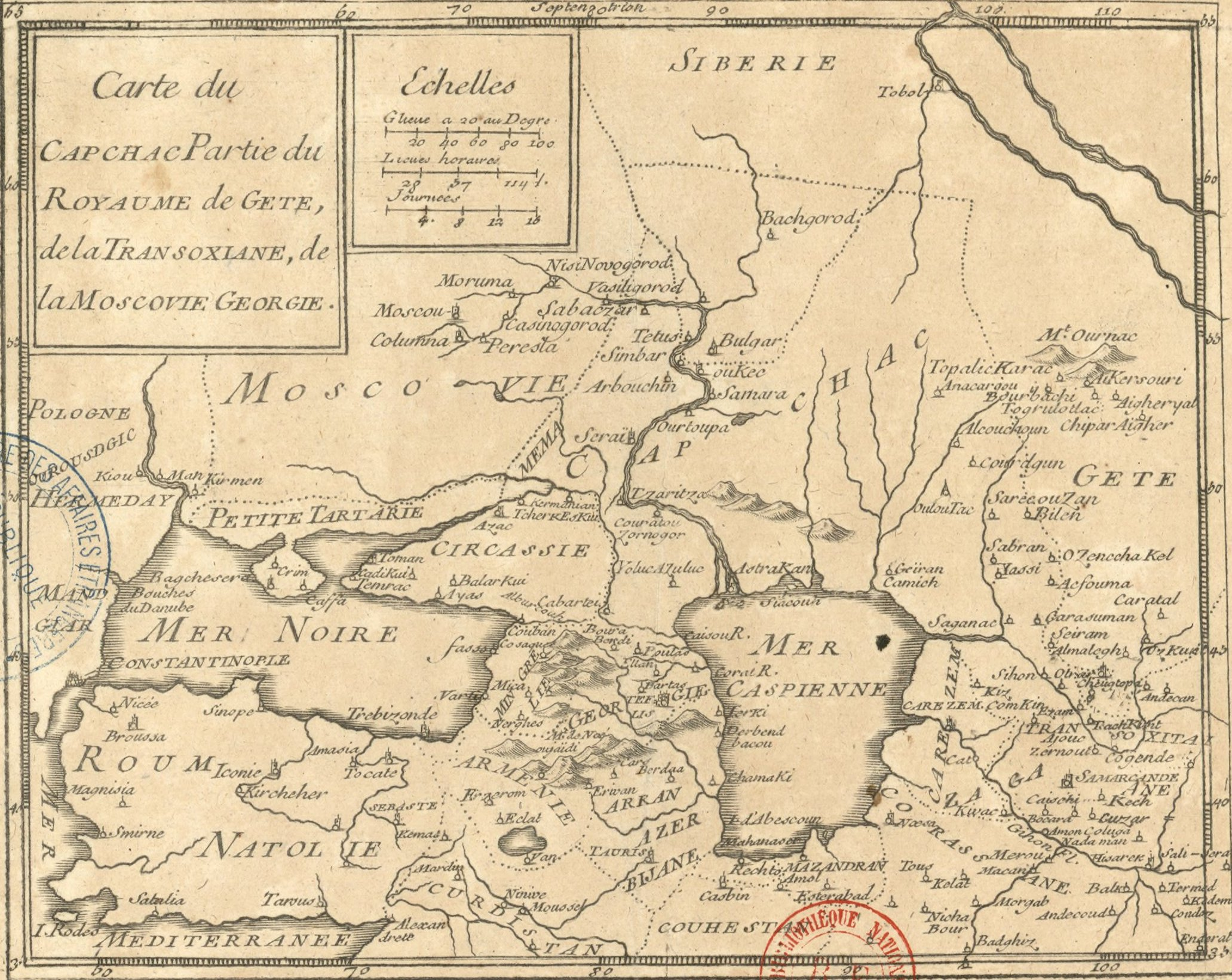
Carte du Capchac Partie du Royaume de Gete

== See also ==
- Sea of the West
