= Louis de l'Isle de la Croyère =

French astronomer (c. 1685 – 1741)

Louis de l'Isle de la Croyere
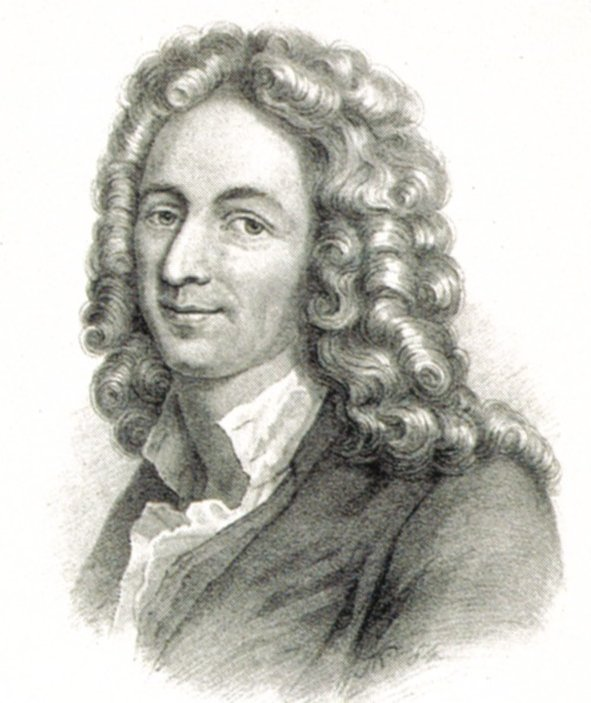
- Portrait
- Born: c. 1685; Paris, France
- Died: October 21, 1741 (aged 55–56); Petropavlovsk, Russia

Academic work
- Discipline: Astronomy

Louis de l'Isle de la Croyère (Note: He added his mother's name) (Russian: Людовик Делиль де ла Кроер; c. 1685 – 10 October 1741) was a French astronomer in Russian service who became an academician of the Russian Academy of Sciences in Saint Petersburg.

== Biography ==
Louis de l'Isle was the son of historian and geographer Claude Delisle (1644–1720) and half brother of cartographer Guillaume Delisle (1675–1726). He was invited to Russia in February 1726 by his brother Nicolas (1688–1768) who had arrived the previous year as the director of the cartography department at the Imperial Saint Petersburg Academy of Sciences. Louis de l'Isle was made professor of astronomy and academician in January 1727.

He was named as the head of the first astronomical and geological expedition in Russia's European north. He reported observations on the region of Arkhangelsk and on the Kola Peninsula (1727–1729). His journals were the first to report the geographical locations of many shores along the White Sea.

As part of the academic component of the Second or Great Northern Expedition, in 1741 de l'Isle was with the Russian explorer Aleksei Chirikov on the ship St. Paul en route from Kamchatka to Alaska. On the return voyage, he died of scurvy at Avacha Bay (Oct. 21, Gregorian). He was buried near Avacha.
