= 1652 in France =

- Decades: 1630s; 1640s; 1650s; 1660s; 1670s
- See also: History of France; Timeline of French history; List of years in France

Events from the year 1652 in France.

== Incumbents ==
- Monarch – Louis XIV

== Events ==
- 7 April – Battle of Bléneau

== Births ==
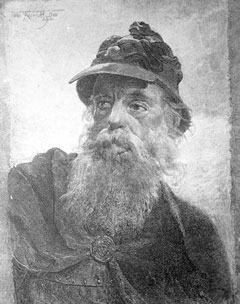
Jean-Vincent d'Abbadie de Saint-Castin

- 24 January – Nicolas Chalon du Blé, general (died 1730)
- 14 February – Camille d'Hostun, duc de Tallard, nobleman, diplomat and military officer (died 1728)
- 9 April – Jean Le Fèvre, astronomer and physicist (died 1706)
- 21 April – Michel Rolle, mathematician, known for Rolle's theorem (died 1719)
- 9 November – Marie Anne d'Orléans, princess (died 1656)

=== Full date missing ===
- Jean-Vincent d'Abbadie de Saint-Castin, military officer (died 1707)
- Charles de Ferriol, ambassador (died 1722)

== Deaths ==
- 13 March – Claude Bouthillier, statesman (born 1581)
- 13 April – Georges Fournier, Jesuit priest, geographer and mathematician (born 1595)
- May – Claude de L'Estoile, playwright and poet (born 1602)
- 10 May – Jacques Buteux, Jesuit missionary in Canada, shot (born 1600)
- 10 August – Jean Gaston, Duke of Valois, prince (born 1650)
- 18 August – Florimond de Beaune, mathematician (born 1601)
- November – Charles Fleury, lutenist, fell down a flight of stairs and apparently died in the arms of composer Johann Froberger (born c.1605)

=== Full date missing ===
- Jacques Gaultier, lutenist (born c.1600)
