= 1659 in France =

- Decades: 1630s; 1640s; 1650s; 1660s; 1670s
- See also: History of France; Timeline of French history; List of years in France

Events from the year 1659 in France.

== Incumbents ==
- Monarch: Louis XIV

== Events ==
- 21 May – France, the Commonwealth of England, and the Dutch Republic sign the Concert of The Hague.
- 7 November – Treaty of Pyrenees: French King Louis XIV and King Philip IV of Spain agree to French acquisition of Roussillon and
- The Spanish Infanta Maria Theresa brings cocoa to Paris.
- Parisian police raid a monastery, sending monks to prison for eating meat and drinking wine during Lent.

== Births ==
- 4 March – Pierre Lepautre (1659–1744), French artist (d. 1744)
- 8 March – Isaac de Beausobre, French Protestant pastor (d. 1738)
- 22 June – Simon-Pierre Denys de Bonaventure, French officer and governor of Acadia (d. 1711)
- 18 July – Hyacinthe Rigaud, French painter (d. 1743)

=== Full date unknown ===
- Charles Ancillon, French Protestant pastor (d. 1715)

== Deaths ==
- 16 January – Charles Annibal Fabrot, French lawyer (b. 1580)
- 17 February – Abel Servien, French diplomat (b. 1593)
- 8 October – Jean de Quen, French Jesuit missionary and historian (b. c. 1603)
