= 1661 in France =

- Decades: 1640s; 1650s; 1660s; 1670s; 1680s
- See also: History of France; Timeline of French history; List of years in France

Events from the year 1661 in France.

== Incumbents ==
- Monarch – Louis XIV

== Events ==
- The Paris Opera Ballet established
- The Académie Royale de Danse established

== Births ==
- 1 November – Louis, Grand Dauphin, heir apparent to the throne (died 1711)

=== Full date unknown ===
- Daniel d'Auger de Subercase, naval officer (died 1732)

== Deaths ==
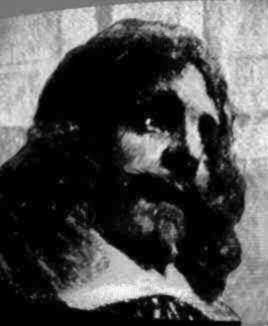
Girard Desargues

=== Full date unknown ===
- Girard Desargues, mathematician (born 1591)
- René Menard, Jesuit missionary (born 1605)
- Louis Couperin, composer (born c.1626)
- Georges de Brébeuf, poet (born 1618)
