= Guillaume Delisle =

French cartographer (1675–1726)

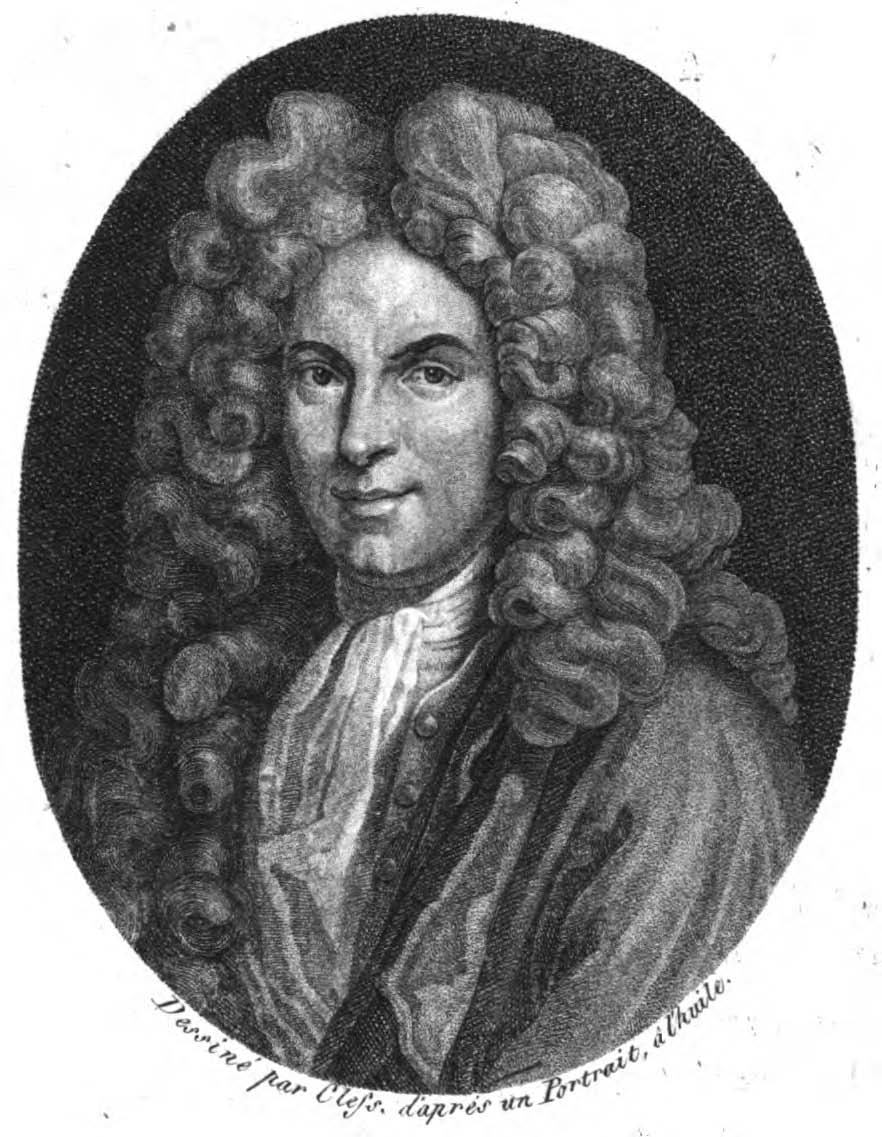
- Guillaume Delisle portrayed by Konrad Westermayr, 1802
- Born: Guillaume Delisle; 28 February 1675; Paris, France
- Died: 25 January 1726 (aged 50); Paris, France
- Other names: Guillaume de l'Isle, Guillelmo Delille
- Education: Student of Giovanni Domenico Cassini
- Occupation: Cartographer
- Years active: 1696-1726
- Known for: Scientific cartography; accurate maps of Canada, Europe and the Americas
- Notable work: Carte de la Nouvelle-France et des Pays Voisins (1696); Mappe-Monde (1700); Carte du Canada ou de la Nouvelle France (1703); Carte du Bourdelois du Périgord et des provinces voisines (1714); Carte de la Lousiane et du Cours du Mississippi (1718); Carte de Perse (1724)
- Relatives: Father: Claude Delisle; Half-brothers: Joseph Nicolas Delisle; Louis de l'Isle de la Croyère
- Awards: Member of the Académie Royale des Sciences (1702); Premier Géographe du Roi (1718)

Guillaume Delisle, also spelled Guillaume de l'Isle, or Guillelmo Delille (French pronunciation: [ɡijom dəlil]; 28 February 1675, Paris – 25 January 1726, Paris) was a French cartographer known for his popular and accurate maps of Europe and the newly explored Americas.

== Childhood and education ==
Delisle was the son of Marie Malaine and Claude Delisle (1644–1720). His mother died after childbirth and his father married again, to Charlotte Millet de la Croyère. Delisle and his second wife had as many as 12 children, but many of them died at a young age. Although the senior Delisle had studied law, he also taught history and geography. He had an excellent reputation in Paris’ intellectual circles, and served as a tutor to lords. Among them was the duke Philippe d’Orléans, who later became regent for the crown of France, and collaborated with Nicolas Sanson, a well-known cartographer. Guillaume and two of his half-brothers, Joseph Nicolas and Louis, ended up pursuing similar careers in science.

While his father has to be given credit for educating Guillaume, the boy showed early signs of being an exceptional talent. He soon contributed to the family workshop, by drawing maps for his father's historical works. Some have questioned the authorship of these first maps, saying that Delisle only copied what his father had done before him. In order to perfect his skills, Guillaume Delisle became the student of the astronomer Jean-Dominique Cassini. Early on he produced high-quality maps, the first being his Carte de la Nouvelle-France et des Pays Voisins in 1696.

== Career ==
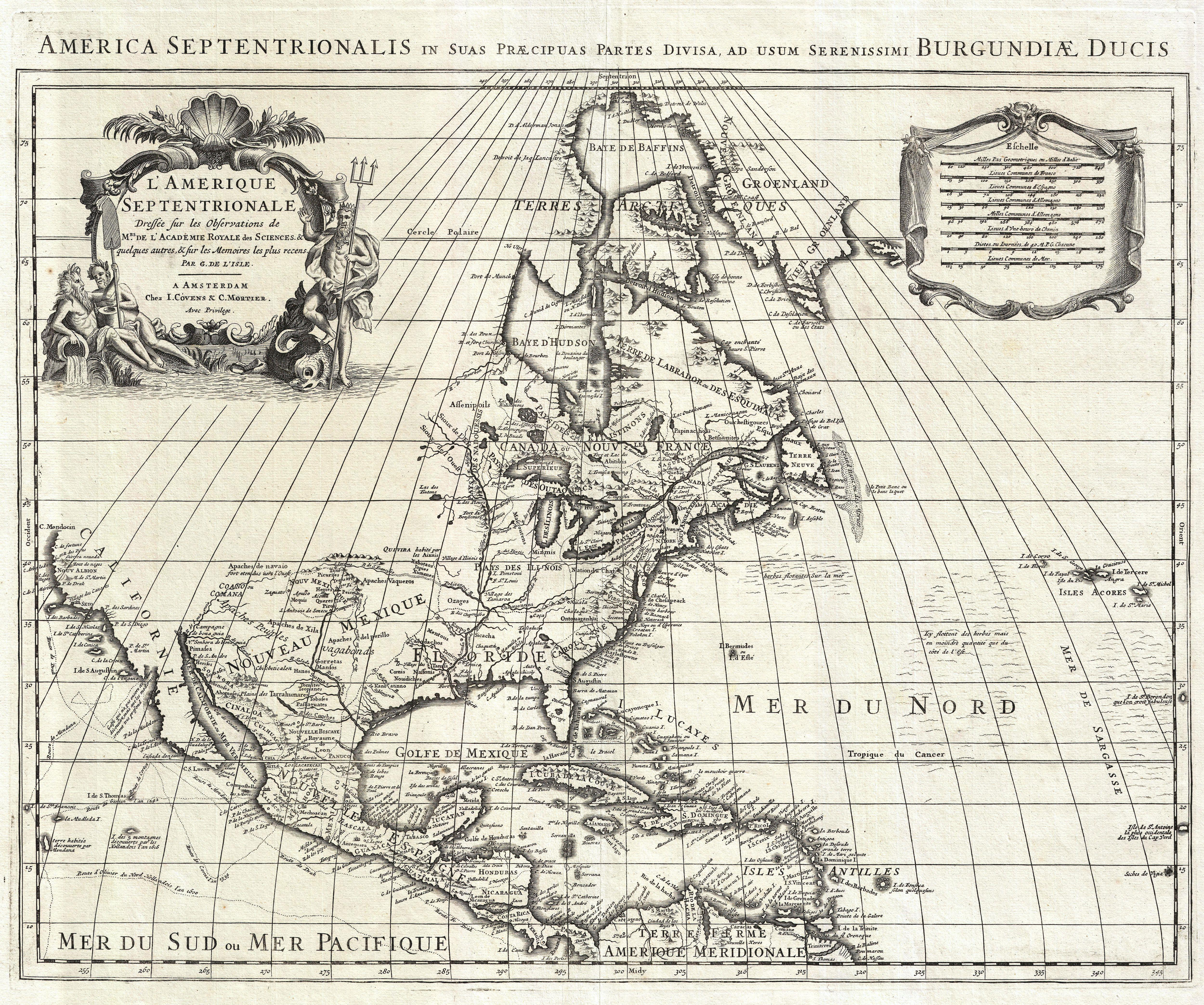
1700 map by De L'Isle of North America, reissued by Covens and Mortier in 1708.

At 27, Delisle was admitted into the French Académie Royale des Sciences, an institution financed by the French state. After that date, he signed his maps with the title of "Géographe de l’Académie". Five years later, he moved to the Quai de l’Horloge in Paris, a true publishing hub where his business prospered. Delisle's progress culminated in 1718 when he received the title of Premier Géographe du Roi. He was appointed to teach geography to the Dauphin, King Louis XIV’s son, a task for which he received a salary. Historian Mary Sponberg Pedley says, "once authority was established, a geographer's name might retain enough value to support two or three generations of mapmakers". In Delisle's case, it could be said that his accomplishments surpassed his father's. Up to that point, he had drawn maps not only of European countries, such as Italy, Spain, Germany, Great Britain, Poland, and regions such as the Duchy of Burgundy, but he had also contributed to the empire's claims to recently explored continents of Africa and the Americas.

Like many cartographers of his day, Delisle did not travel with the explorers. He drew maps mostly in his office, relying on a variety of data. The quality of his maps depended on a solid network to provide him first-hand information. Given his family's and his own reputation, Delisle had access to fairly recent accounts of travellers who were returning from the New World, which gave him an advantage over his competitors. Being a member of the Académie, he also kept current with recent discoveries, especially in astronomy and measurement. When he could not confirm the accuracy of a source, he would indicate it clearly on his maps. For instance, his Carte de la Louisiane shows a river that the baron of Lahontan claimed he discovered. As no one else could validate it, Delisle noted a warning to the viewer that it might not exist.

Delisle's search for exactitude and intellectual honesty entangled him in a legal dispute in 1700 with Jean-Baptiste Nolin, a fellow cartographer. On March 8, 1700, De L'Isle accused Nolin (at first not naming him) of having copied proprietary cartographic information from a manuscript globe that he had made for Chancellor Boucherat, which resided in the cabinet of the latter's son. This globe included information that De L'Isle had intentionally not put in print, such as the Sea of the West, because, according to De L'Isle himself, he did not want to make it available to France's competition. De L’Isle wrote of the Sea of the West. Delisle took Nolin to court to prove his plagiarism. In the end, Delisle convinced the jury of scientists that Nolin knew only the old methods of cartography and must have stolen the information from Delisle's own manuscript. Nolin's maps were confiscated and he was forced to pay the court costs of the case. The high scientific quality of the work produced by the Delisle family contrasted with the workshop of Sanson. While Sanson knowingly published outdated facts and mistakes, Delisle worked to present up-to-date knowledge.

== Legacy ==
After Guillaume Delisle's death in 1726, his widow tried to preserve the workshop and protect the family. She appealed to the king with the help of the abbot Bignon, the king's librarian and president of the academies. By that time, Guillaume's brothers Joseph-Nicolas and Louis had already left France to serve Peter the Great in Russia. The youngest Delisle, Simon Claude, lacked practical knowledge in cartography; he asked for the king's help in finding him an associate. The Delisle workshop was bequeathed to Philippe Buache.

Dutch cartographer Jan Barend Elwe reissued maps by Delisle in the late 18th century.

== Maps ==
=== Louisiana ===
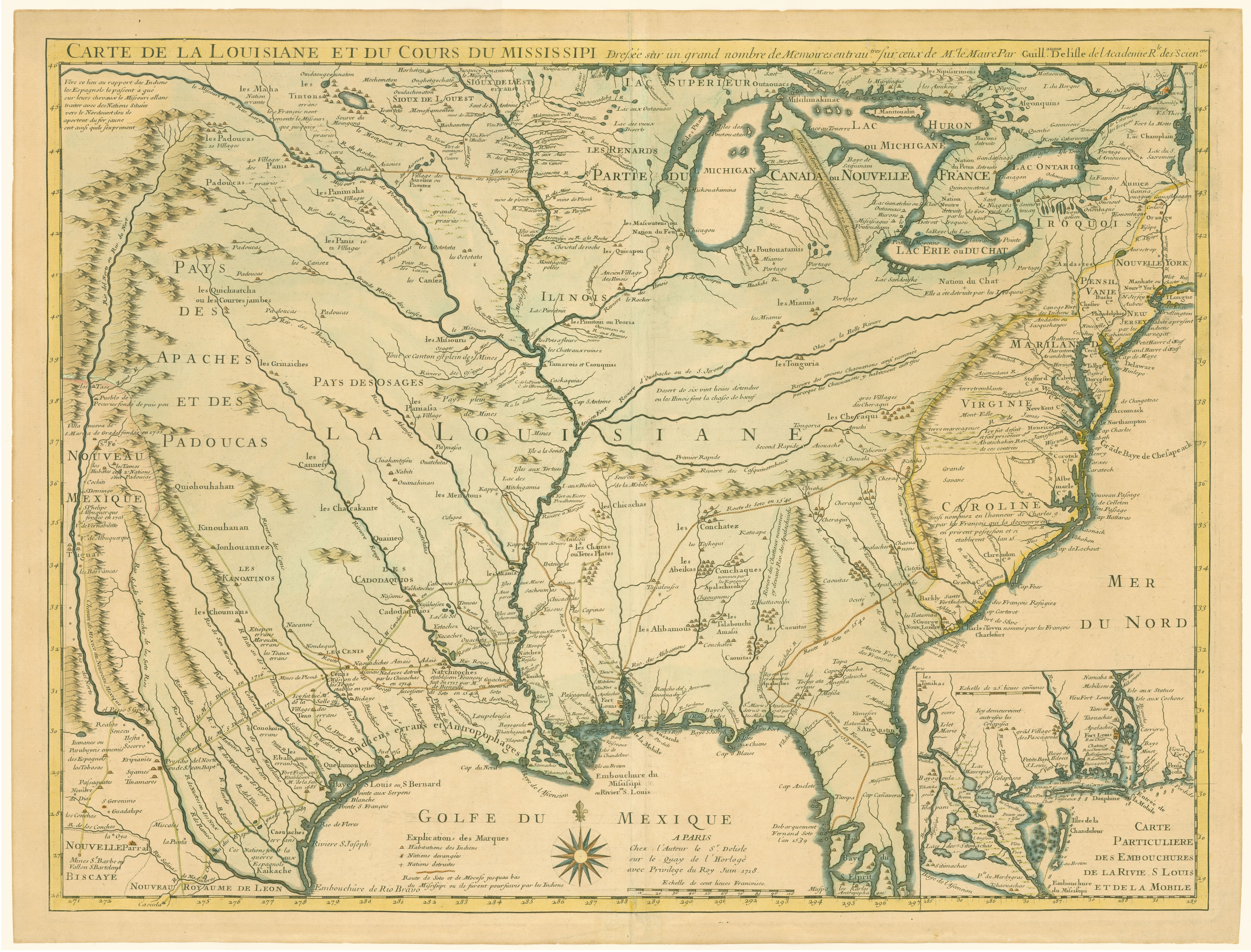
Delisle's 1718 Carte de la Louisiane

Delisle's 1718 Carte de la Louisiane et du Cours du Mississippi is an example of French cartography at its height. It was widely circulated in Europe and remained in print for years, either copied exactly or used as a base map. As a result of its accurate representation of the lower Mississippi and the surrounding areas, Delisle's map became a source map for all succeeding maps of the Mississippi River. It is particularly notable for its relatively accurate depiction of the Gulf area, as well as for its wealth of detail and information. The map is centered on the Mississippi River and the interior of what would later become the continental United States. It spans the area from the bottom of Lake Superior in the north to the point at which the Rio Grande meets the Gulf of Mexico in the south; the map also extends from the Atlantic coast, where numerous European settlements had been made, and westward to the Rocky Mountains.

The map is very detailed, including information on both known Indian territories (identified by tribes) and English colonies. The hundreds of labels on the map name lakes, rivers, colonies, cities, forts, mountains, and Indian tribes. It is ornamented with animals, ships, and cities, marked by small squares, circles, or rectangles with crosses on the top. These symbols are defined in the legend, which is located at the bottom of the map. It notes Indian habitations and includes an undulating line to mark the routes of Fernando de Soto and Louis de Moscoso in the area of the Mississippi where they were chased by Indian tribes. Next to the legend is a 16-point compass, placed in the center of the Gulf of Mexico. A fleur-de-lis indicates the geographic north; the magnetic north is omitted from the compass, suggesting that the map was not created as for navigational purposes.

The map does not have much detail for the Carolina region, shown as extending into present-day Tennessee and Kentucky. For example, there is a flawed conception of the Appalachians as reaching into the Michigan peninsula, an error potentially borrowed from earlier maps by Morden Brown or Sanson. The largest area of the map by far was "La Louisiane", or Louisiana. This was a France-centric version of the continent, intended to convey that the colony was firmly established colony by 1718. The colony consisted of between four hundred to seven hundred men, women, and children clustered around the mouth of the Mississippi. The map labeled major waterways and copper mines which could serve to boost the nation's commerce. It was considered to be a politically charged document that also depicted explorers’ routes and controversial territorial claims in the New World.

The British and Spanish areas of the map appear small compared to those of the French, even though the French presence in the interior of the continent was minimal at the time. The map extended the territories under French control by pushing the British colonial border further east than the Appalachian frontier. The British were incensed to see the claim that the Province of Carolina was named for the French king, Charles IX, and not for England's Charles II.

Because of the perceived territorial offenses against the British colonies on the map, there was a political controversy between England and France that lasted for at least fifteen years. The English Board of Trade filed several complaints. In 1720 a rival map was published and distributed by Englishman Herman Moll. Delisle's map is part of the complex relationship between Europe and the Americas known as the Trans-Atlantic Exchange. Delisle extended the French territorial claims to the Rio Grande and Pecos River, causing outrage in turn in Spain. Spanish cartographers reacted by producing their own maps of their territories; this information had previously been protected as "virtual state secrets." Months after Delisle's map of Louisiana was published, Louis XV awarded him the unique title of premier geographe du roi, with a pension of 1200 livres.

The Delisle map of 1718 is significant as a major shift in cartographic authority in the Western cartographic tradition, from the classical Greek traditions to one based more strongly on science. Delisle based this and other maps on astrologically determined latitudes and longitudes, as well as on critical examinations of primary and secondary source material. In this way, this map is a precursor to the cartography of the later 18th century, which relied on science and expressed imperial ambitions.

=== New France ===
Delisle's 1703 Carte du Canada ou de la Nouvelle France is praised as the first map to correctly depict the latitude and longitude of Canada. To accomplish this feat, Delisle – while never having personally visited the New World – devoted seven years to in-depth research. He made several earlier sketches drawn from information extracted from the Jesuit Relations, and personal relationships with many missionaries and explorers enhanced his ability to gain a rather extensive knowledge of the landscape. He also used calculations of the eclipse to find the precise longitude of Quebec which had, up until that point, only been guessed at. The research behind this map, in addition to its mathematical nature, made it a standard for maps to come. It had a large impact when it was published, underscoring the French strength in New France in the early 18th century, and it stood out as an early example of a more dispassionate, scientific type of map relative to the impressionistic ones of centuries before.

The map itself is quite detailed, covering such vast areas as New France, Greenland, Labrador, Hudson Bay, Baffin Bay, and the Great Lakes and Arctic regions. Delisle did not attempt to fill in areas of white space where his knowledge was insufficient, rather he let these spaces remain, a decision indicative of cartographical renewal in France in that period. In spite of these holes and the scientific nature of his map, Delisle's 1703 Carte still contains a large amount of information from Indians and considerations on imperial influence. In at least one instance, Delisle employed information from Indians that was not necessarily confirmed by a European authority. For example, on the map, Lake Winnipeg – marked as Lac des Assenipoils – is shown with its water communication down to the Hudson Bay, information taken from an Indian report rather than one of European discovery. Furthermore, although hundreds of Indian tribes were identified in Delisle's earlier sketches, he consolidated a number of related bands under one heading in his final map. In other instances, information about certain traditional grounds provided in earlier maps, such as those of the Mistassini Cree, was omitted in Delisle's 1703 map either due to famine, disease, or collapse of hunting grounds.

The map provides a large cartouche in the upper left corner, which includes scenes from the New World implying imperial claims. The cartouche was done by the artist N. Guerard and carried the symbol of French royalty. Other parts of the cartouche included a Jesuit missionary performing a baptism of an Indian and a Recollects missionary guiding Indians toward the road to heaven. There is also the image of a Haudenosaunee brandishing a scalp of a Frenchman, and Haudenosaunee on a bed of thistles, a Huron holding rosary beads, and beaver. In this way, the map – which is otherwise relatively scientific – is not entirely depoliticized.

== Persia ==
The map of Iran at the end of the Safavid period is depicted in 1724 (late Safavid dynasty). In French this is named Carte de Perse. Starting from the Sea of Azov and the Crimea from the West, it extends to Kashmir and Kabul in the east. In the north, the map goes to the highest point of the Caspian Sea and to the south the Persian Gulf and the Strait of Hormuz. The name of Persian Gulf in the map is explicitly included as the Golfe Persique.

This map covers areas which today are countries including Iraq, Afghanistan, Iran, Kuwait, Uzbekistan, Turkmenistan, Tajikistan, Armenia, and the republic of Azerbaijan. The map also contains parts of today’s Russia, Pakistan, Turkey, Ukraine, Kazakhstan, Kurdistan, and the Arabian Peninsula. In the map Delisle has drawn mountains and connecting roads between cities.

== Gallery ==
=== International ===
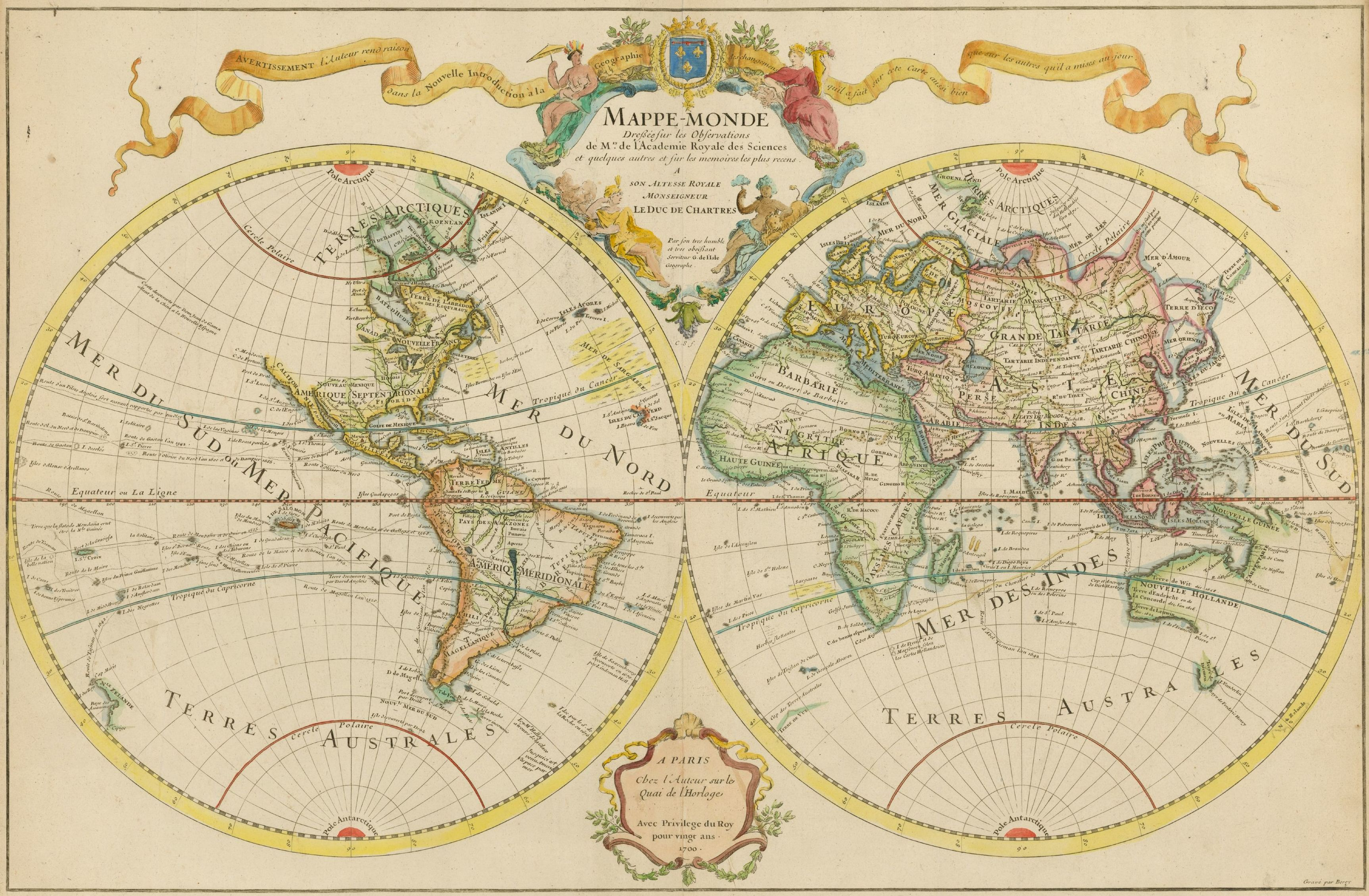
Delisle's Mappe-Monde, 1700

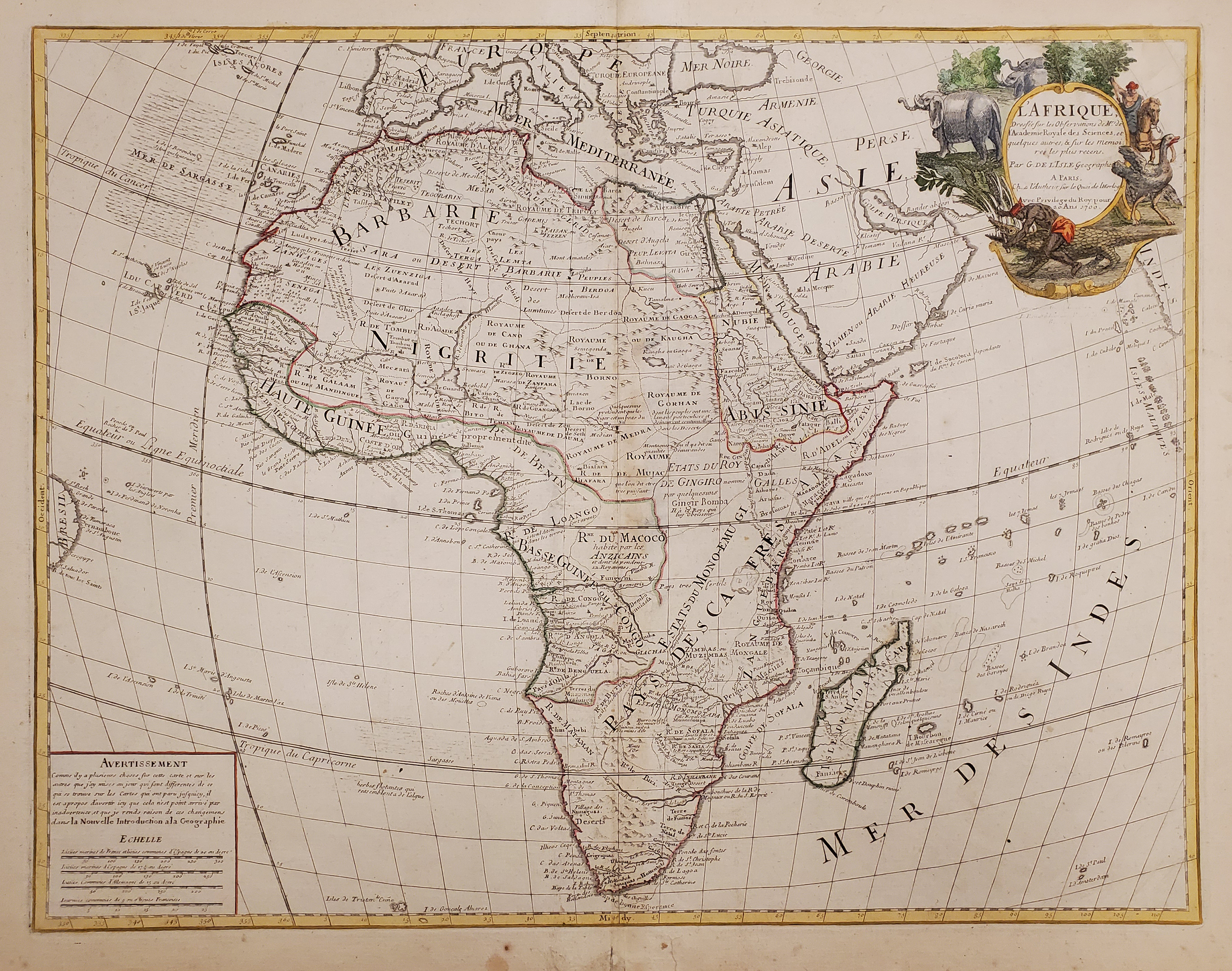
Delisle's L'Afrique, 1700

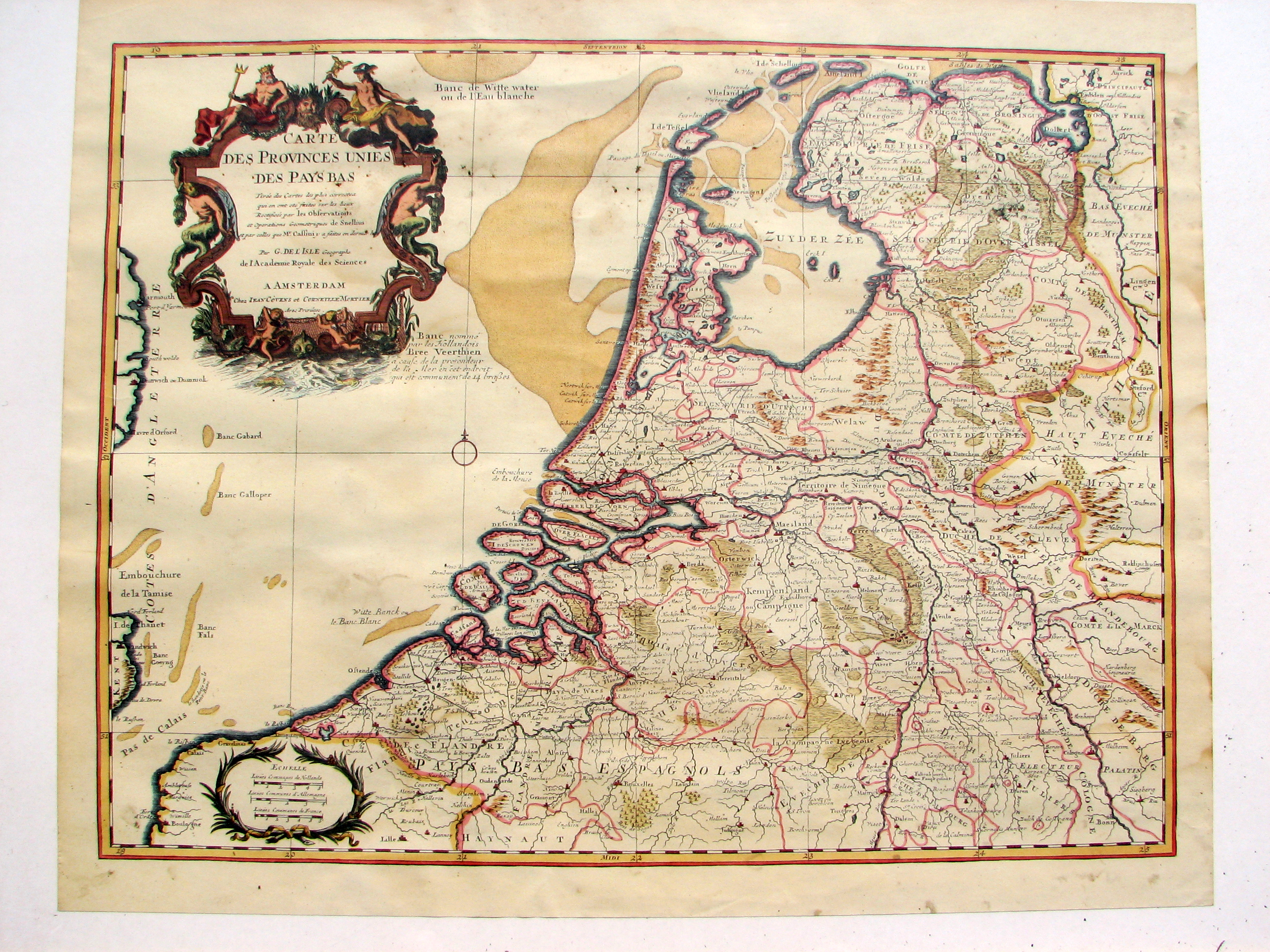
Delisle's Carte des Provinces Unies des Pays Bas, 1702. Posthumous Amsterdam 1743 edition of the original map of 1702

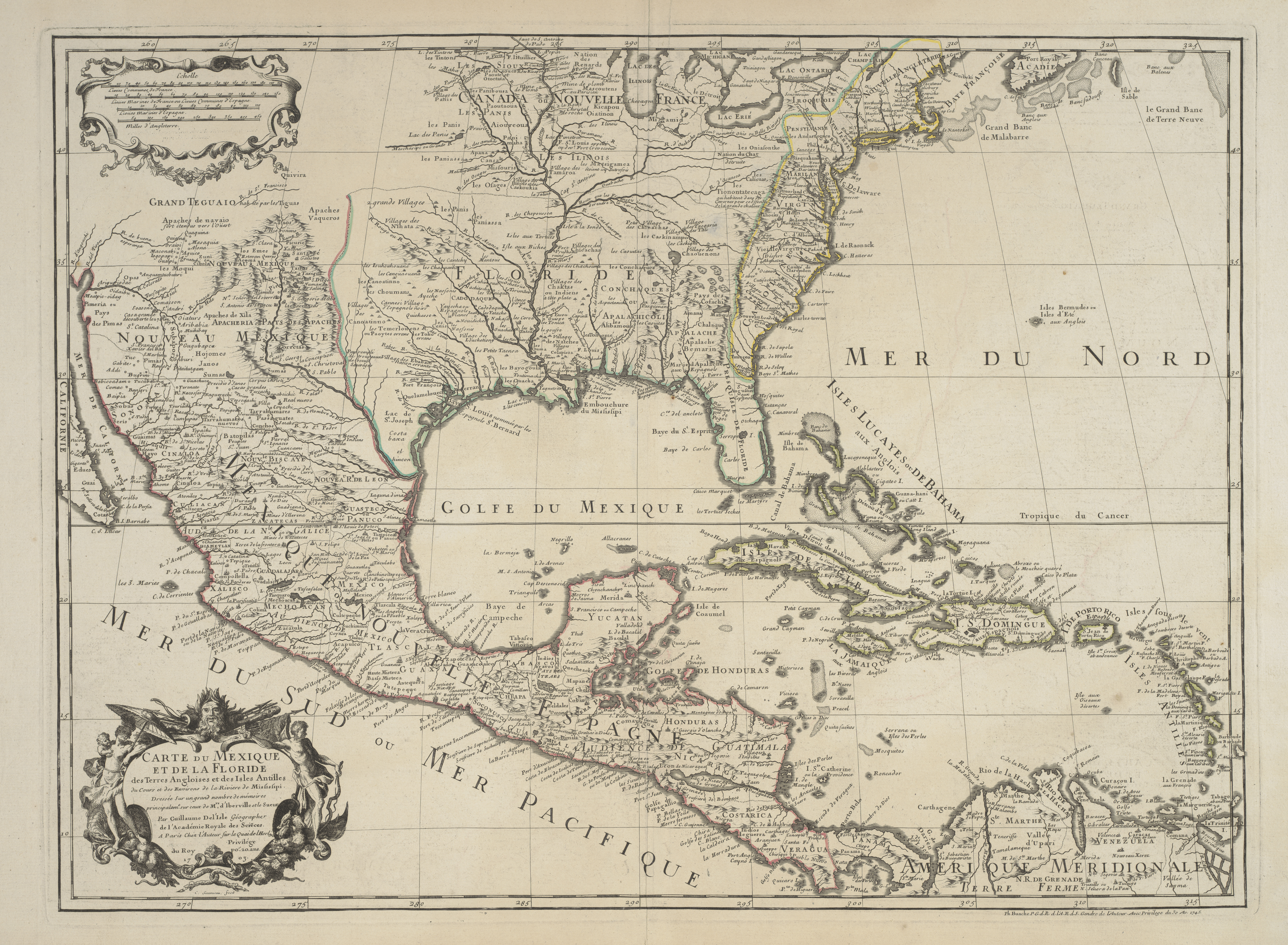
Delisle's Carte du Mexique et de la Floride, 1703

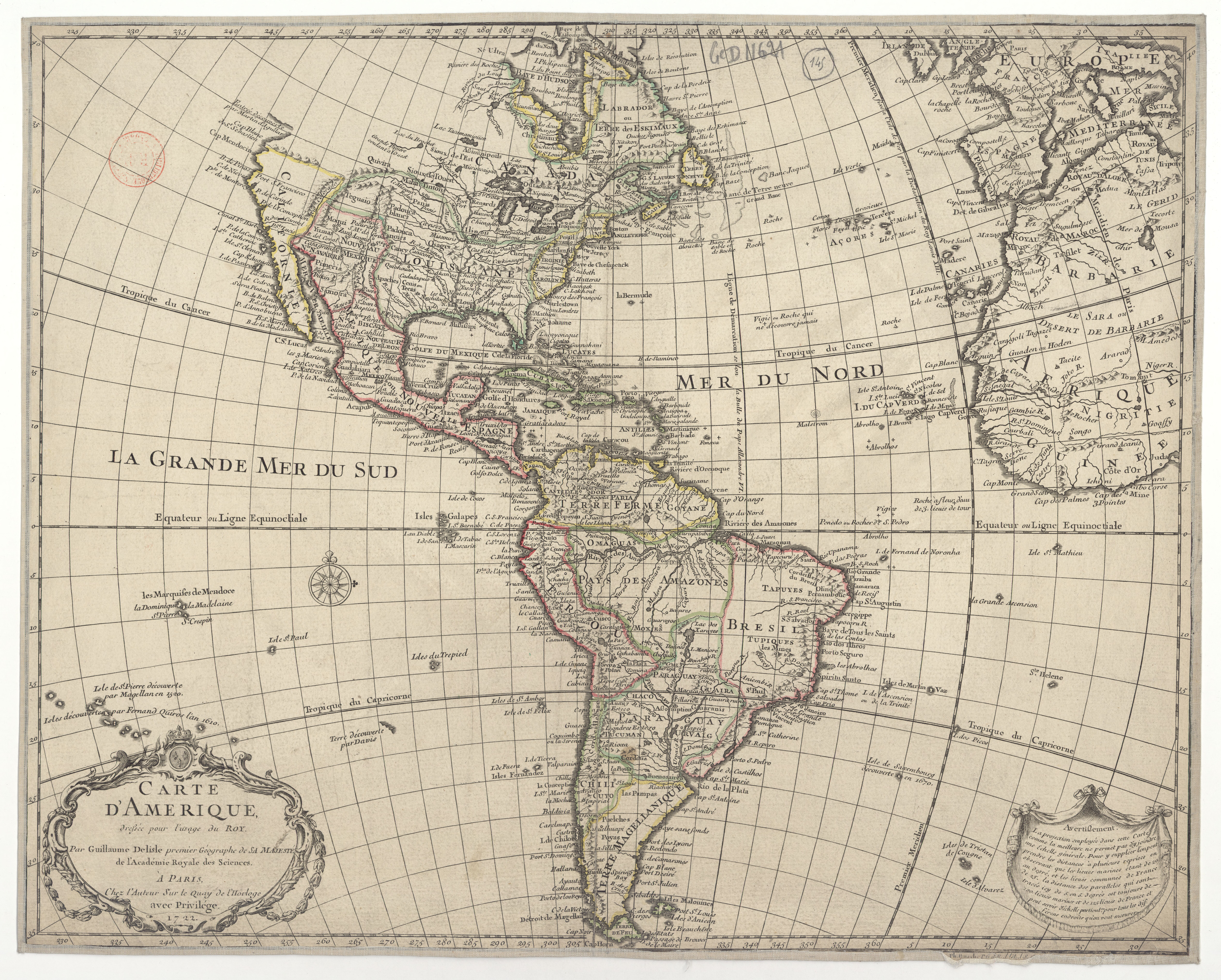
Delisle's Carte d'Amérique, 1722

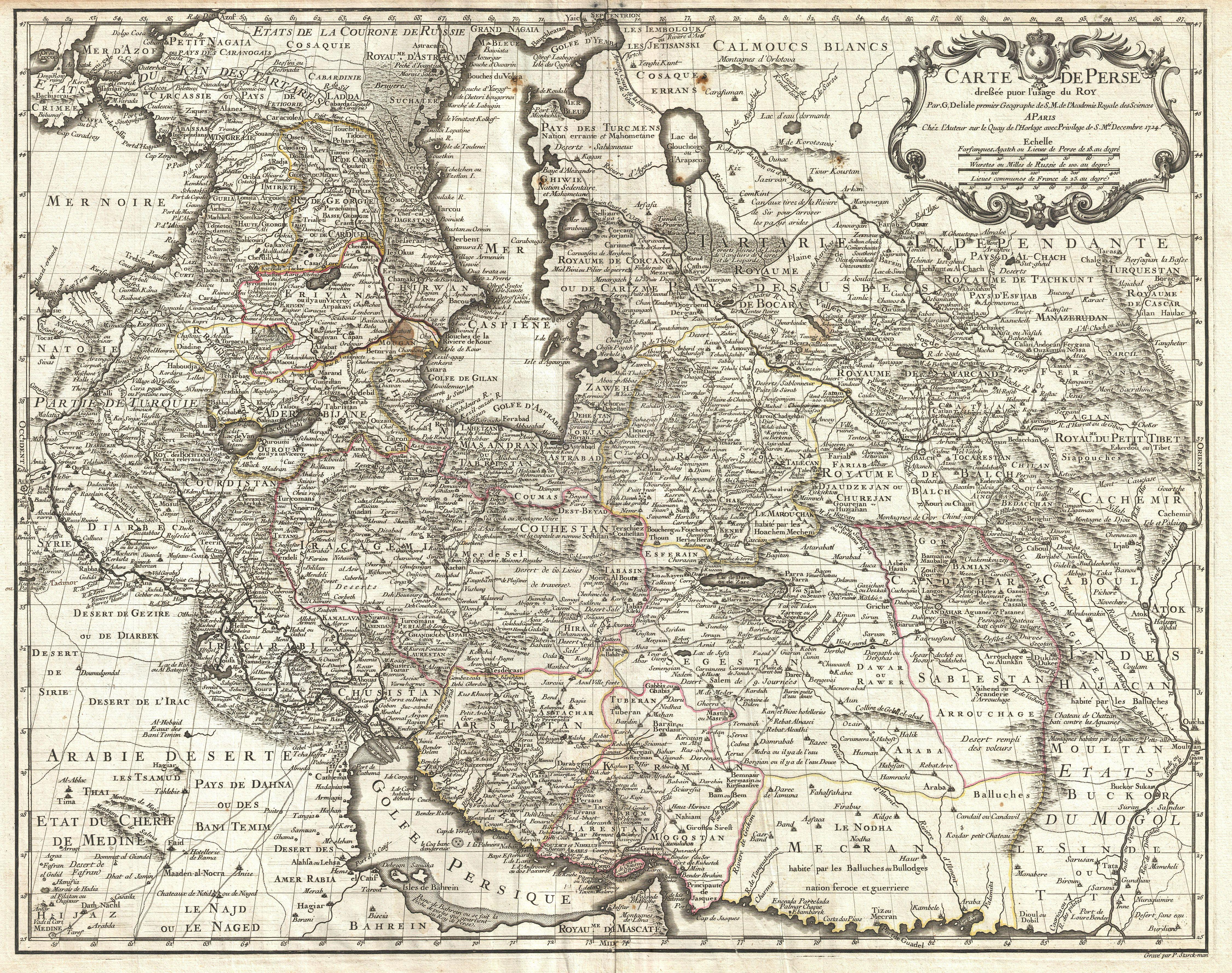
Iran (Persia) at the end of the Safavid period

=== From Carte de la Louisiane et du cours du Mississippi, 1718 ===
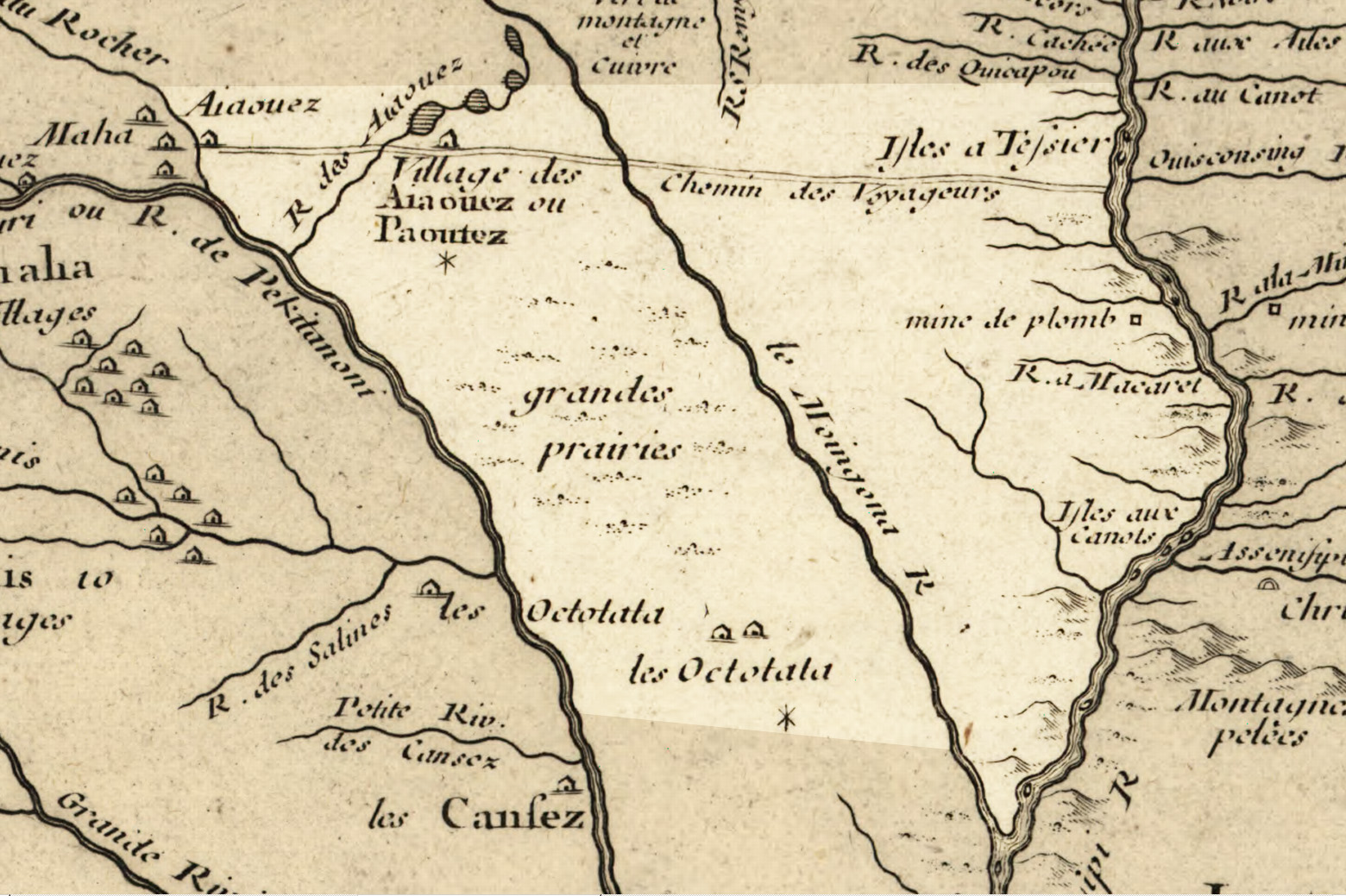
Iowa

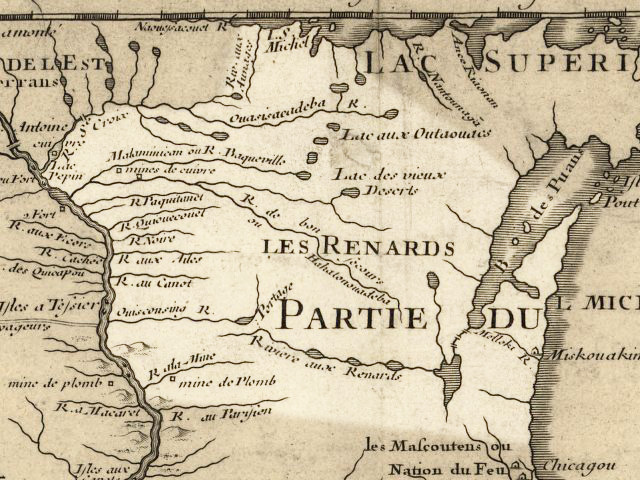
Wisconsin

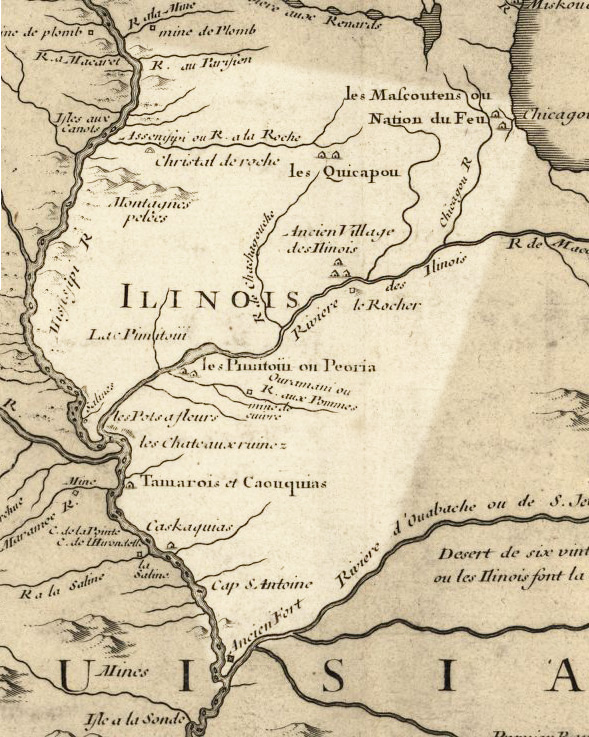
Illinois

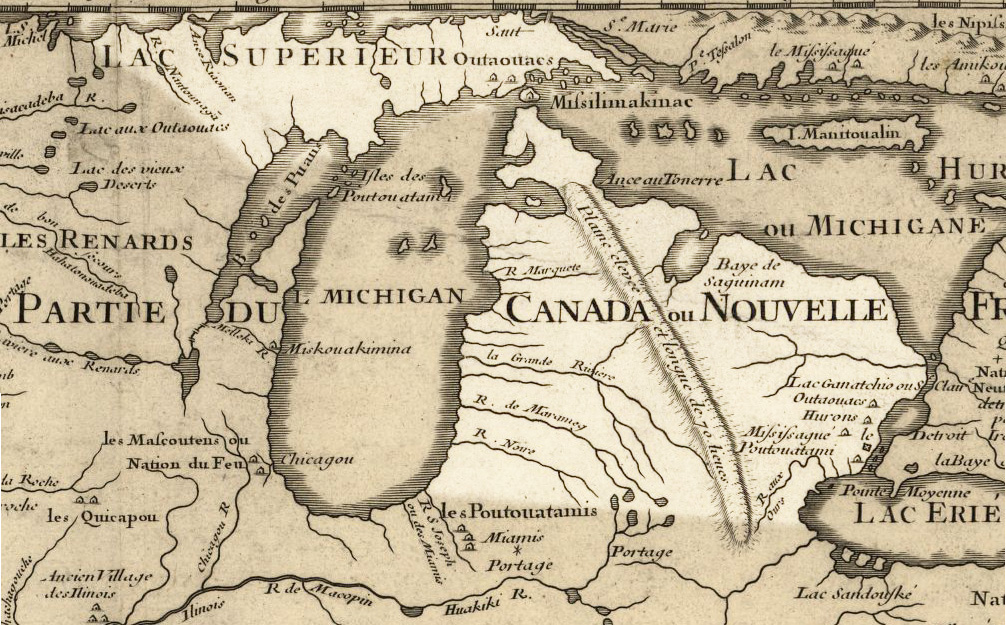
Michigan

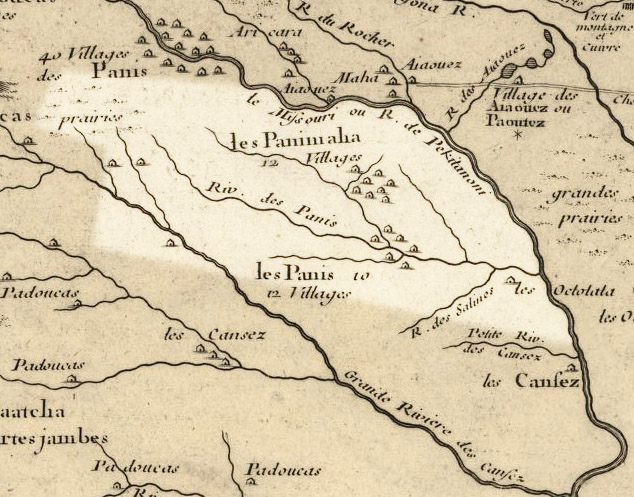
Nebraska

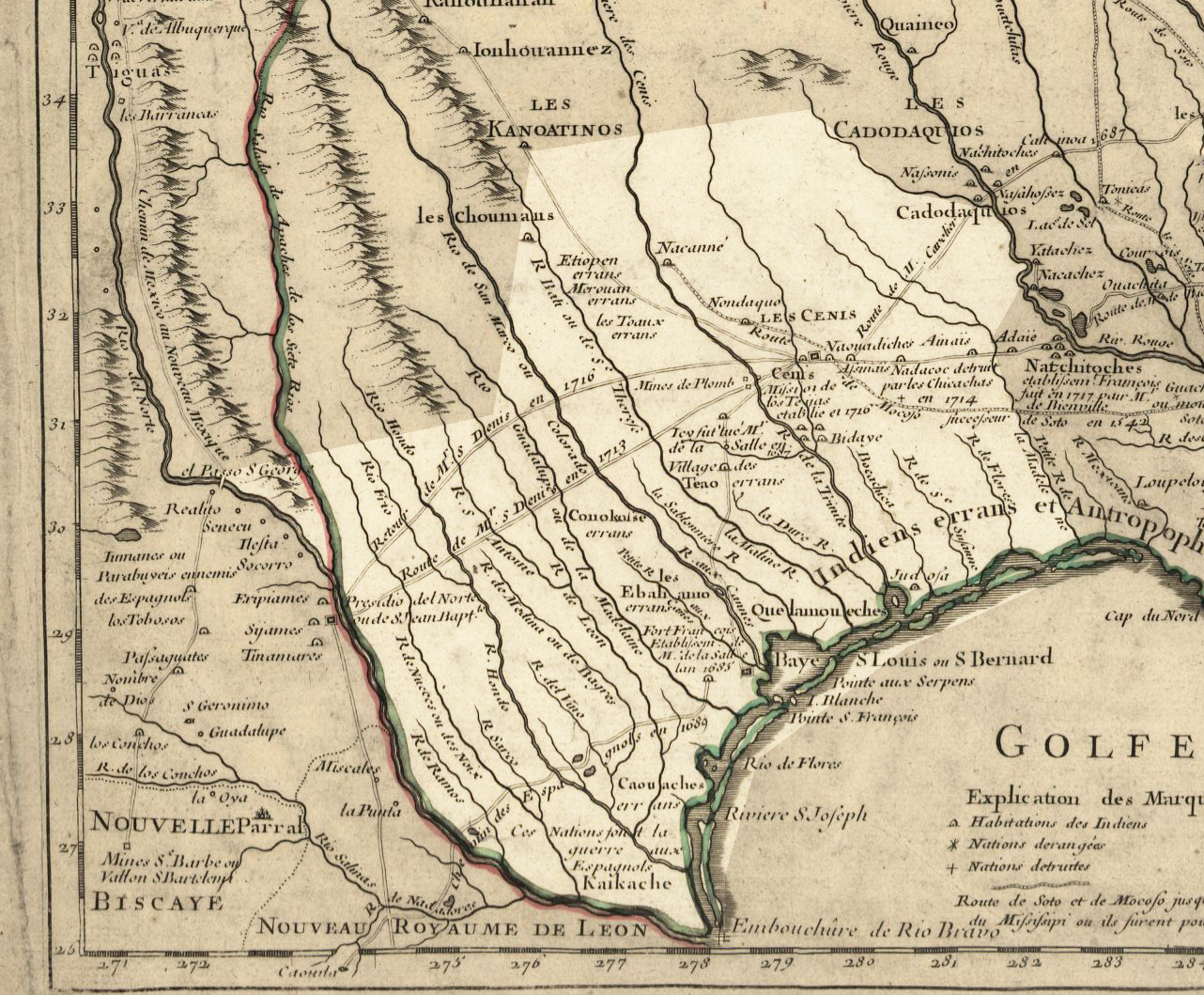
Texas

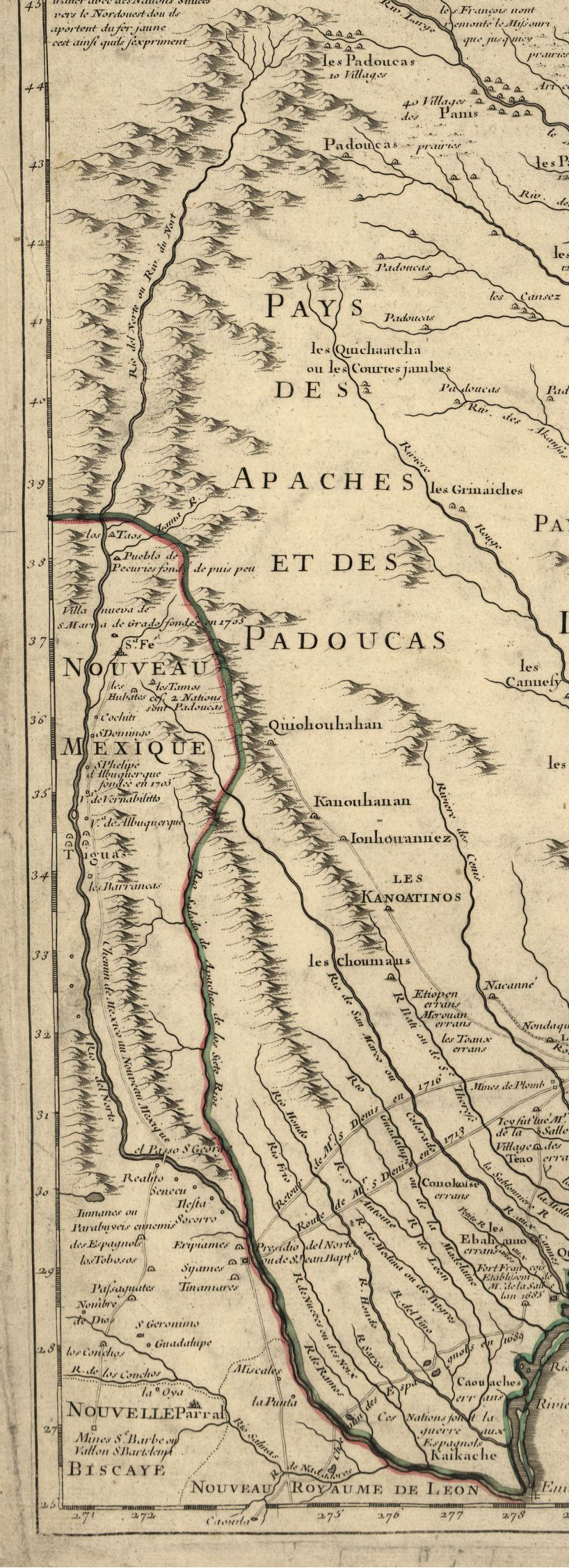
Rio Grande

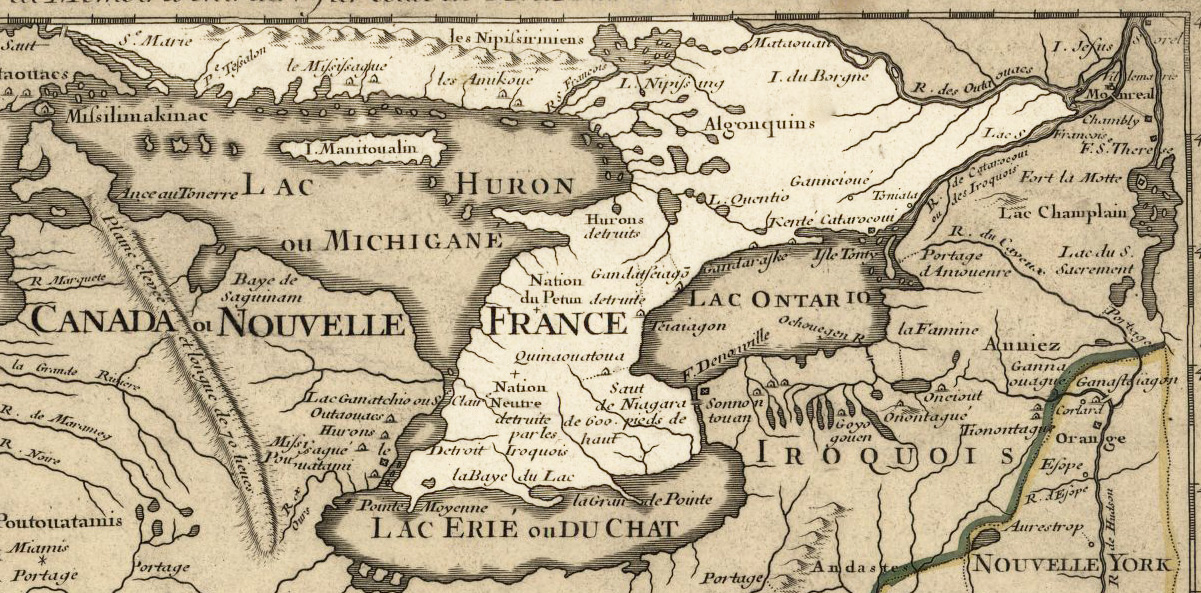
Ontario

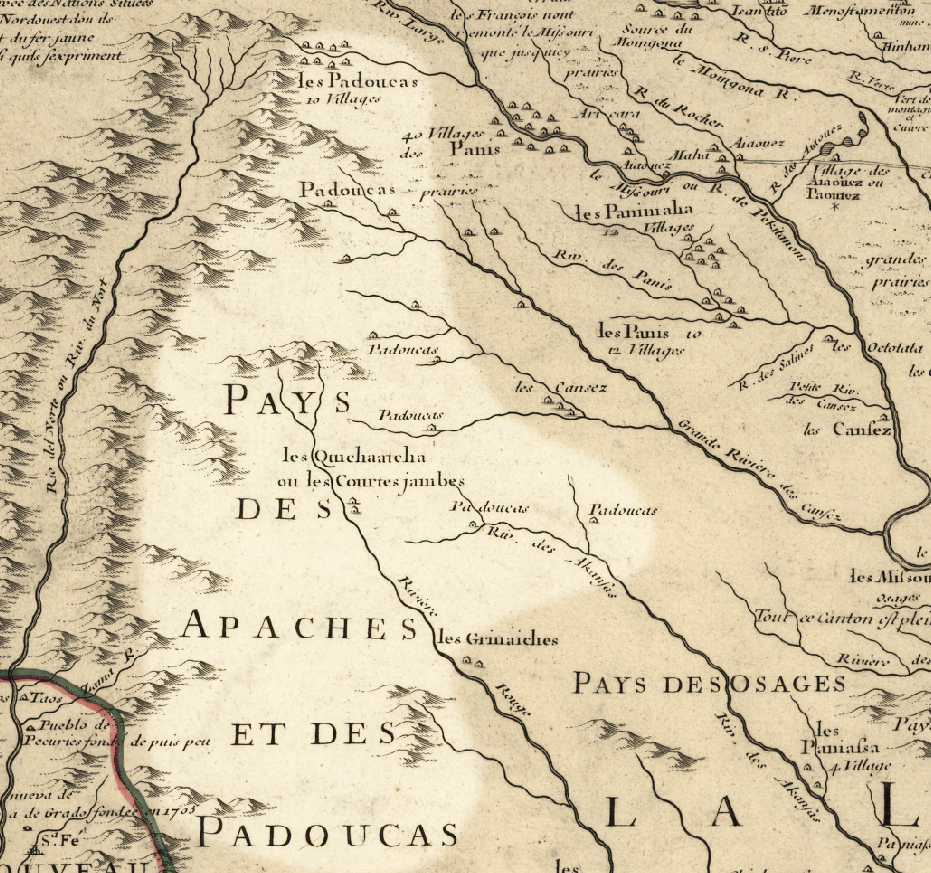
Comanche range

== Legacy ==
Delisle Inlet in Antarctica is named after Guillaume Delisle.

Bayou DeLisle and DeLisle, Mississippi are both named for Delisle.
