= Delisle Inlet =

Body of water in Graham Land, Antarctica

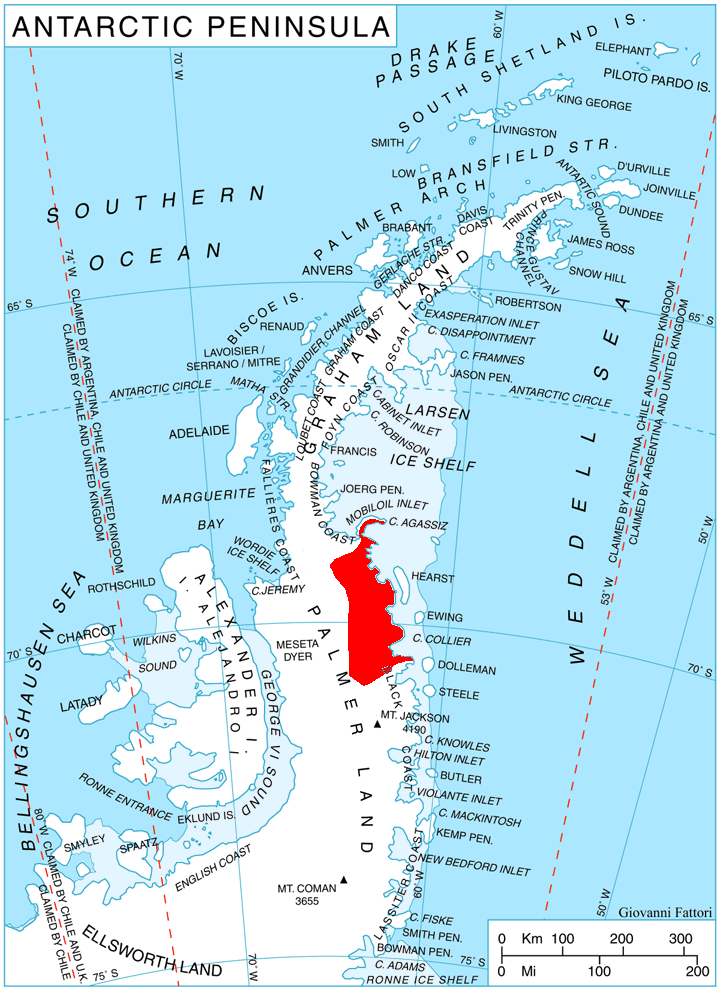
Location of Wilkins Coast on Antarctic Peninsula.

Delisle Inlet (Bulgarian: залив Дьолил, ‘Zaliv Delisle’ \'za-liv dyo-'lil\) is the 8.4 km wide ice-filled inlet indenting for 12.7 km the southeast side of Kenyon Peninsula, Wilkins Coast on the Antarctic Peninsula. It is entered southwest of Cape Keeler and northeast of Cape Mayo.

The feature is named after the French cartographer Guillaume Delisle (also spelled Guillaume de L'Isle; 1675–1726) whose 1700 map of South America featured the Antarctic island of Roché (South Georgia).

== Location ==
Delisle Inlet is centred at 68°51′00″S 63°23′00″W. British mapping in 1963 and 1976.

== Maps ==
- British Antarctic Territory. Scale 1:200000 topographic map. DOS 610 Series, Sheet W 68 62. Directorate of Overseas Surveys, Tolworth, UK, 1963.
- British Antarctic Territory: Palmer Land. Scale 1:250000 topographic map. BAS 250 Series, Sheet SR 19-20. London, 1976.
- Antarctic Digital Database (ADD). Scale 1:250000 topographic map of Antarctica. Scientific Committee on Antarctic Research (SCAR). Since 1993, regularly upgraded and updated.
