= 1658 in France =

- Decades: 1630s; 1640s; 1650s; 1660s; 1670s
- See also: History of France; Timeline of French history; List of years in France

Events from the year 1658 in France.

== Incumbents ==
- Monarch – Louis XIV

== Events ==
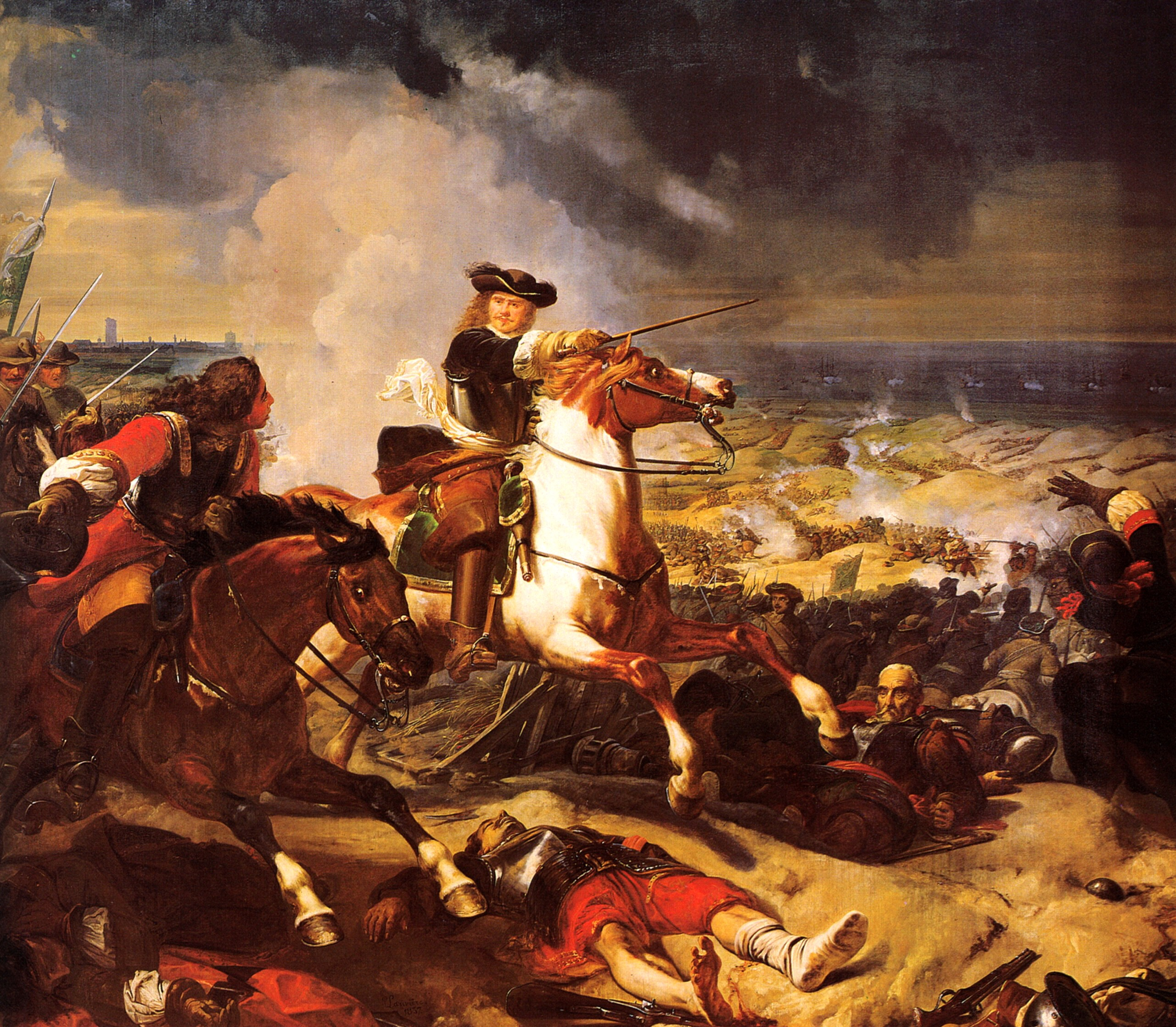
The Battle of the Dunes by Charles-Philippe Larivière, depicting the Battle of the Dunes

- 14 June – Battle of the Dunes
- The siege of Dunkirk

== Births ==
- 11 October – Henri de Boulainvilliers, nobleman and historian (died 1722)

== Deaths ==
- 18 June – Louis Cappel, clergyman (born 1585)
- September – Lucy Walter, royal mistress (born c.1630 in Wales)
- 20 October – Louis Cellot, Jesuit writer (born 1588)
- 6 November – Pierre du Ryer, dramatist (born 1606)

=== Full date unknown ===
- Hubert Le Sueur, sculptor (born c.1580)
