= 1656 in France =

- Decades: 1630s; 1640s; 1650s; 1660s; 1670s
- See also: History of France; Timeline of French history; List of years in France

Events from the year 1656 in France.

== Incumbents ==
- Monarch: Louis XIV

== Births ==
- April 10 – René Lepage de Sainte-Claire, lord-founder of Rimouski in eastern Quebec, Canada (d. 1718)
- April 12 – Benoît de Maillet, French diplomat and natural historian (d. 1738)
- May 31 – Marin Marais, French composer and viol player (d. 1728)
- June 5 – Joseph Pitton de Tournefort, French botanist (d. 1708)
- July 18 – Joachim Bouvet, French Jesuit active in China (d. 1730)
- July 20 – Johann Bernhard Fischer von Erlach, Austrian architect (d. 1723)
- August 6 – Claude de Forbin, French naval commander (d. 1733)
- August 12 – Claude de Visdelou, French missionary (d. 1737)
- August 16 – Christian Knaut, German physician (d. 1716)
- August 18 – Ferdinando Galli-Bibiena, Italian painter (d. 1743)
- September 6 – Guillaume Dubois, French cardinal and statesman (d. 1723)
- October 20 – Nicolas de Largillière, French painter (d. 1746)
- November 18 – Jacques de Tourreil, French lawyer (d. 1714)

== Deaths ==
- January 3 – Mathieu Molé, French statesman (b. 1584)
- July 2 – François-Marie, comte de Broglie, Italian-born French commander (b. 1611)
