= 1662 in France =

- Decades: 1640s; 1650s; 1660s; 1670s; 1680s
- See also: History of France; Timeline of French history; List of years in France

Events from the year 1662 in France.

== Incumbents ==
- Monarch: Louis XIV

== Events ==
- March 18 – Carrosses à cinq sols - A short-lived experiment of the first public buses (holding 8 passengers) begins in Paris.
- October 27 – Charles II of England sells Dunkirk to France for £400,000 (or 2.5 million livres).
- December 26 – Molière's play The School for Wives premieres.

== Births ==
- January 17 – Françoise Pitel, French actor (d. 1721)
- April 26 – Marie Louise of Orléans (d. 1689)
- July 1 – Béatrice Hiéronyme de Lorraine, Abbess of Remiremont (d. 1738)
- September 1 – Louis de Carrières, French priest and Bible commentator (d. 1717)
- September 19 – Jean-Paul Bignon, French priest and man of letters (d. 1743)
- November 18 – Princess Anne Élisabeth of France (d. 1662)

== Deaths ==
- March 20 – François le Métel de Boisrobert, French poet (b. 1592)
