= 1654 in France =

- Decades: 1630s; 1640s; 1650s; 1660s; 1670s
- See also: History of France; Timeline of French history; List of years in France

Events from the year 1654 in France.

== Incumbents ==
- Monarch – Louis XIV

== Events ==
- 25 August – Battle of Arras

== Births ==
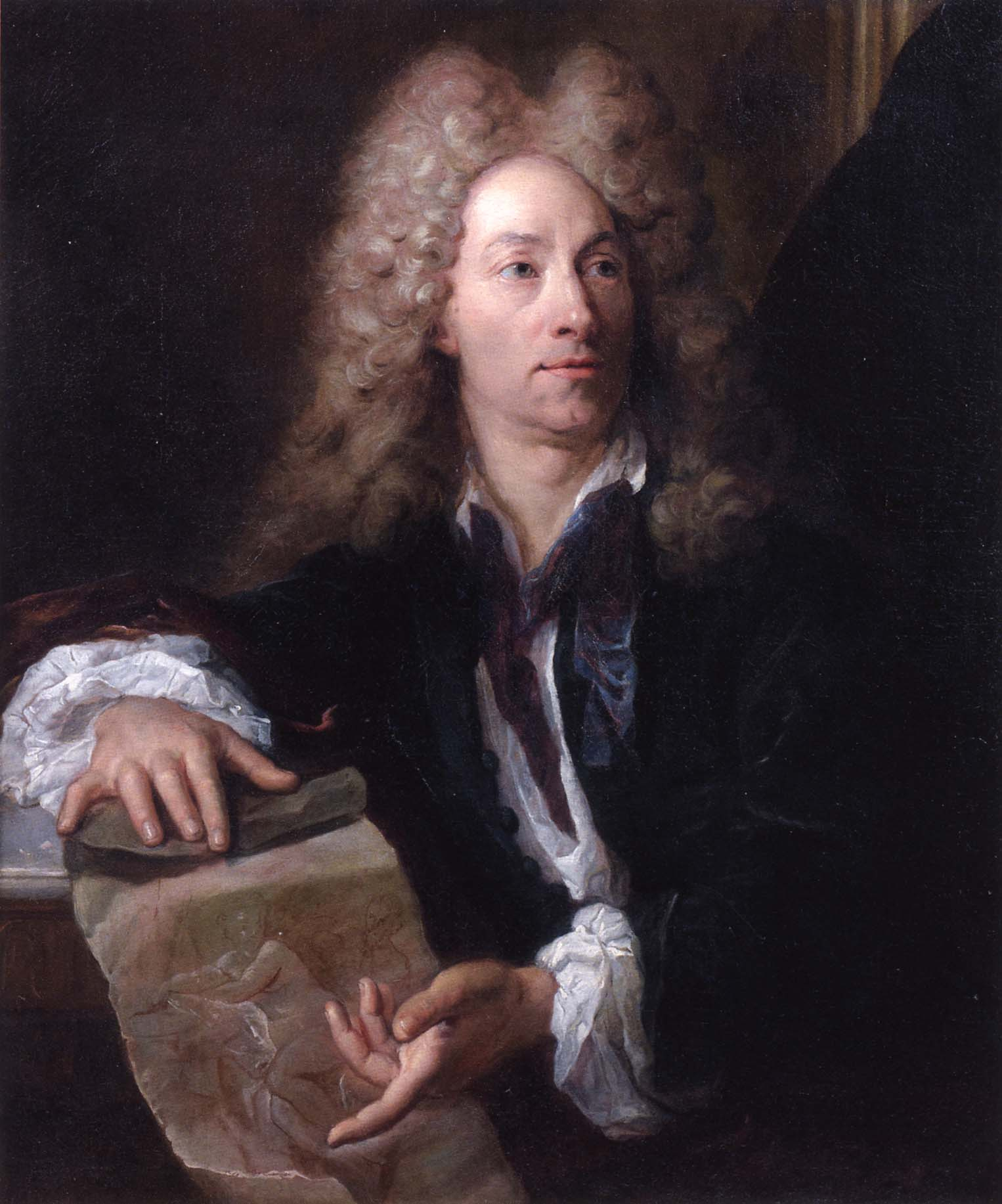
Louis de Boullogne

=== Full date unknown ===
- Louis de Boullogne, painter (died 1733)
- Jean-François Gerbillon, missionary (died 1707)
- Pierre Varignon, mathematician (died 1722)

== Deaths ==
=== Full date unknown ===
- Germain Habert, clergyman and poet (born 1615)
- Jean-Louis Guez de Balzac, essayist (born 1597)
- Nicolas Rigault, classical scholar (born 1577)
- Claude de Razilly, naval officer (born 1593))
