= 1660 in France =

- Decades: 1640s; 1650s; 1660s; 1670s; 1680s
- See also: History of France; Timeline of French history; List of years in France

Events from the year 1660 in France.

== Incumbents ==
- Monarch – Louis XIV

== Events ==
- Carib Expulsion: French-led ethnic cleansing removes most of the Carib population of the island of Martinique.
- Blaise Pascal's Lettres provinciales, a defense of the Jansenist Antoine Arnauld, is ordered by the king to be shredded and burned.

== Births ==
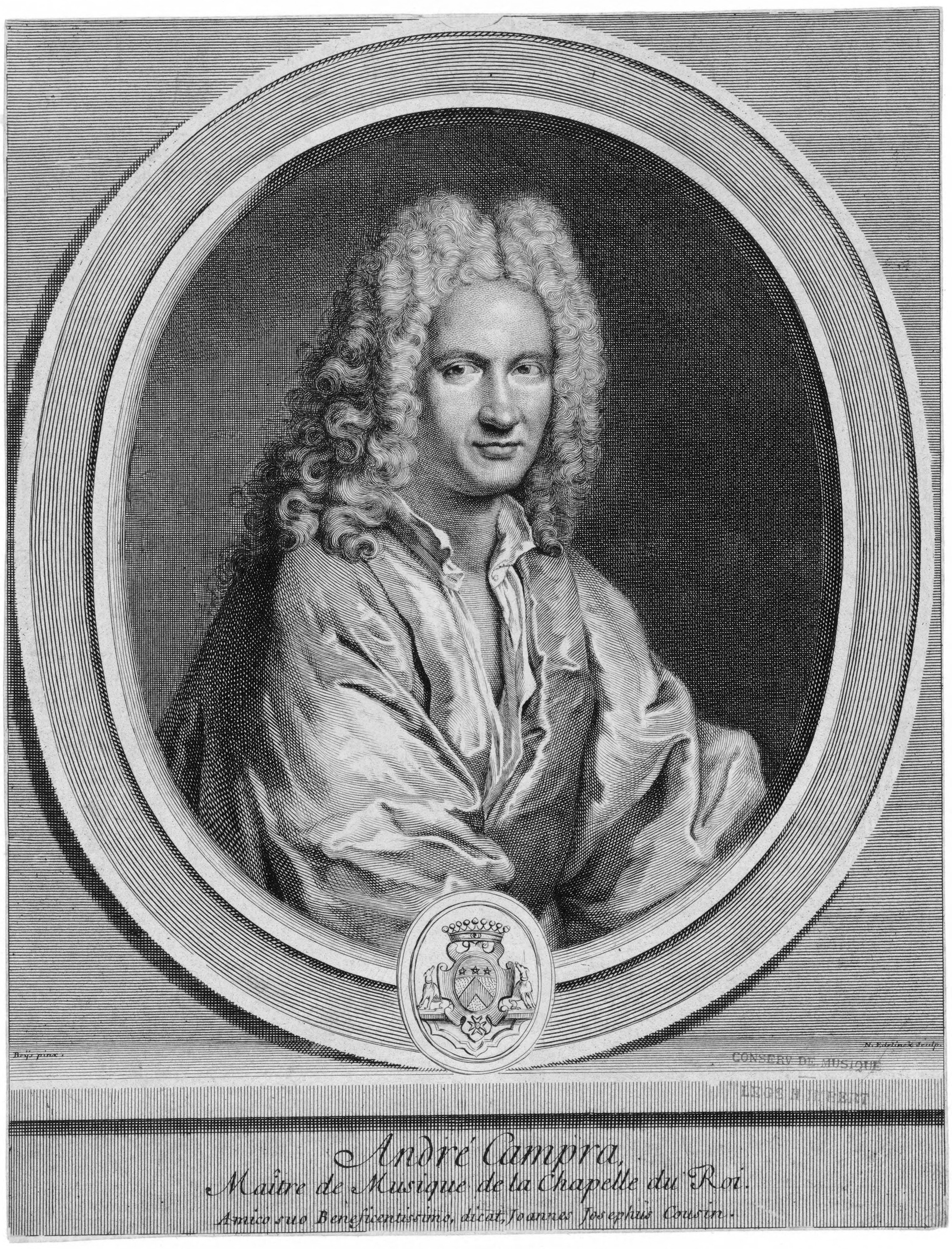
André Campra

- January – Hippolyte Hélyot, historian (died 1716)
- 30 November – Victor-Marie d'Estrées, Marshal of France (died 1737)
- 4 December (bapt.) – André Campra, composer and conductor (died 1744)

== Deaths ==
- 10 June – Étienne de Flacourt, governor of Madagascar, drowned at sea (born 1607)
- 5 November – Alexandre de Rhodes, Jesuit missionary (born 1591)
- 1 December – Pierre d'Hozier, genealogist (born 1592)
- 3 December – Jacques Sarazin, sculptor (born 1588/90)

=== Full date unknown ===
- Jean Boulanger, painter (born 1606)
- Jean-Jacques Chifflet, physician and antiquary (born 1588)
- Richard Tassel, religious painter (born 1582)
- Christophe Tassin, cartographer (born early 1600s)
