= Claude Delisle =

French cartographer (1644–1720)

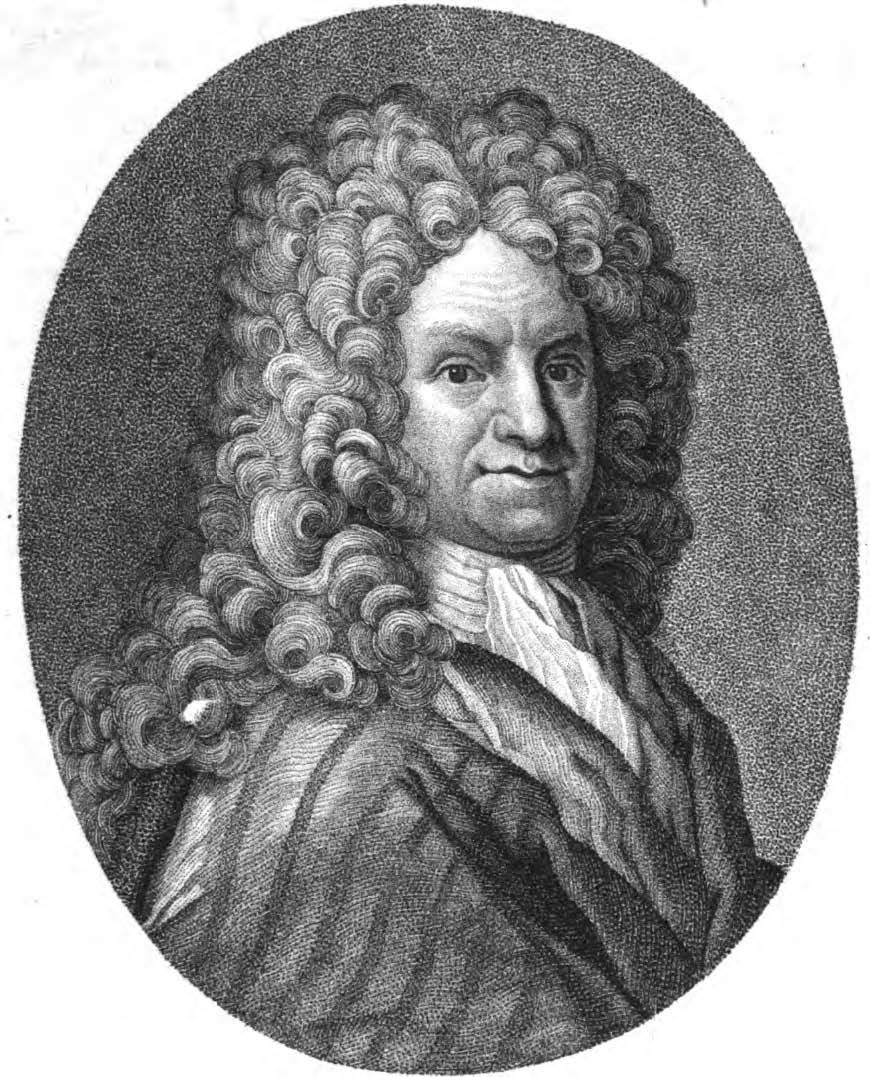
- Born: 5 November 1644
- Died: 2 May 1720 (aged 75); Paris
- Scientific career
- Fields: Geography; Cartography

Claude Delisle (1644–1720; the name also appears as de l'Isle) was a French Geographer, cartographer and historian.

== Biography ==
Born in Vaucouleurs. on November 5 1644 from a physician father, he studied law at Pont-à-Mousson, became a lawyer before settling in Paris in 1674 and becoming a geography and history professor, later obtaining the post of Royal Censor. One of his students was Henri François d'Aguesseau, future Chancellor of France

His main work was a universal history in 7 volumes published posthumously in 1731. He also authored a historical description of Siam

Delisle had eleven sons. Amongst them figure:

- Guillaume Delisle (1675-1726), geographer and cartographer
- Simon-Claude Delisle (1676-1726), historian who continued the works of his father
- Louis de l'Isle de la Croyère (1687-1741), astronomer and explorer
- Joseph-Nicolas Delisle (1688-1768), astronomer, inventor of the Delisle scale
