= Mlle Bocquet =

French lutenist and composer

Mlle Bocquet (either Anne or Marguerite) (early 17th century–after 1661) was a French lutenist and composer. She ran a Salon with a Mlle de Scudéry from 1653–1659. She was in contact with members and founders of the Académie française. Bocquet's compositions explore the chromatic possibilities of the lute, with preludes in every key. Manuscript F-Pn Vm.7 6214 of the Bibliothèque nationale de France contains a number of her preludes. Her music is also in French, German, and English manuscripts of the second half of the 17th century.

== Edition ==
- M. Rollin and A. Souris. Ouvres des Bocquet Paris, 1972.
- Stéphanie Félicité comtesse de Genlis, Mémoires inédits de madame la comtesse de Genlis, Paris et Londres, Colburn, 1825.
- A. Ahmadzadeh, Mlle Bocquet, Iranmusicology, 2022.
