= Jacques Goar =

French Dominican and Hellenist

Jacques Goar (1601 – 23 September 1653) was a French Dominican and Hellenist.

== Life ==
He was born at Paris, entered the convent of the Annunciation in the Rue St. Honoré in 1619, and made his profession there 24 May 1620. Although lector of philosophy and theology, he applied himself to the study of Greek. He was sent to the Orient by his superiors, that he might eventually render service to the Roman Church, through his knowledge of the ecclesiastical documents and the positive theology of the Greeks.

He resided at Chios as missionary Apostolic and prior of the Convent of St. Sebastian (1613–39). He travelled to observe the various rites, to form the acquaintance of Orthodox scholars, and to study the points at issue between the Catholics and Orthodox teachings. About 1640 he returned to Rome bringing with him many manuscripts, some of which were valuable.

Henceforth he was in communication with Greek scholars, notably Leo Allatius, Basil Falasca, George Coresi, Pantaleon Ligardio, and others. In 1643 he returned to Paris and was made master of novices, but in November of that year went to Rome on business for the order. After his return to Paris (16 July 1644) he devoted himself to putting in order the rich material he had brought from the East, which he had increased by visits to the libraries of France and Italy. Appointed vicar provincial in 1652, his health failed under so many labours, and he fell ill and died.

== Works ==
Goar's major work is his Euchologion sive Rituale Graecorum complectens ritus et ordines divinae liturgiae (Paris, 1647), a classic on Greek liturgy; it is important for its original texts and for its learned commentaries; in the second edition (Venice, 1730) a number of errors were corrected.

He also edited "Georgii Cedreni, compendium historiarum" (Paris, 1647); "Georgius Codinus curopalata, De officiis magnae Ecclesiae et aulae Constantinopolitanae (Paris, 1648); "Georgii Monachi et S.P.N. Tarasii Chronographia ab Adamo usque ad Diocletianum"; "Nicephori patriarchae Breviarium chronologicum" (Paris, 1652); "Theophanis Chronographia et Leonis grammatici Vitae" (Paris, 1655). This edition of Theophanes was finished by François Combefis. Goar also left unfinished (in manuscript) a work of the Greek canonist Blastares: "Collectio elementaris materiarum omnium sacris et divinis canonibus contentarum a Matthaeo Blastare elucubrata simul et compacta", and a work of Silvester Syropulos.

Finally, Goar wrote the "Historia universalis Joannis Zonarae ad manuscripts codices recognita" (Paris, 1687); it was continued and completed by Du Cange.
