= Anne Ferrand =

French writer

Anne Ferrand (1657 – 18 November 1740) was a French writer.

The daughter of Francesco Bellinzani and Louise Chevreau, she was born Anne Bellinzani in Paris. In 1676, she married Michel Ferrand, who later became a judge; the couple separated in 1686.

In 1689, she published Histoire nouvelle des amours de la jeune Bélise et de Cléante, an epistolary novel based on her affair with Louis Nicolas le Tonnelier de Breteuil. It was revised and published under the title Histoire des amours de Cléante et de Bélise, avec le recueil de ses lettres in 1691. Her novel continued to be published into the 19th century.

She died in Paris in 1740.
