= Jacques-Philippe Ferrand =

French painter

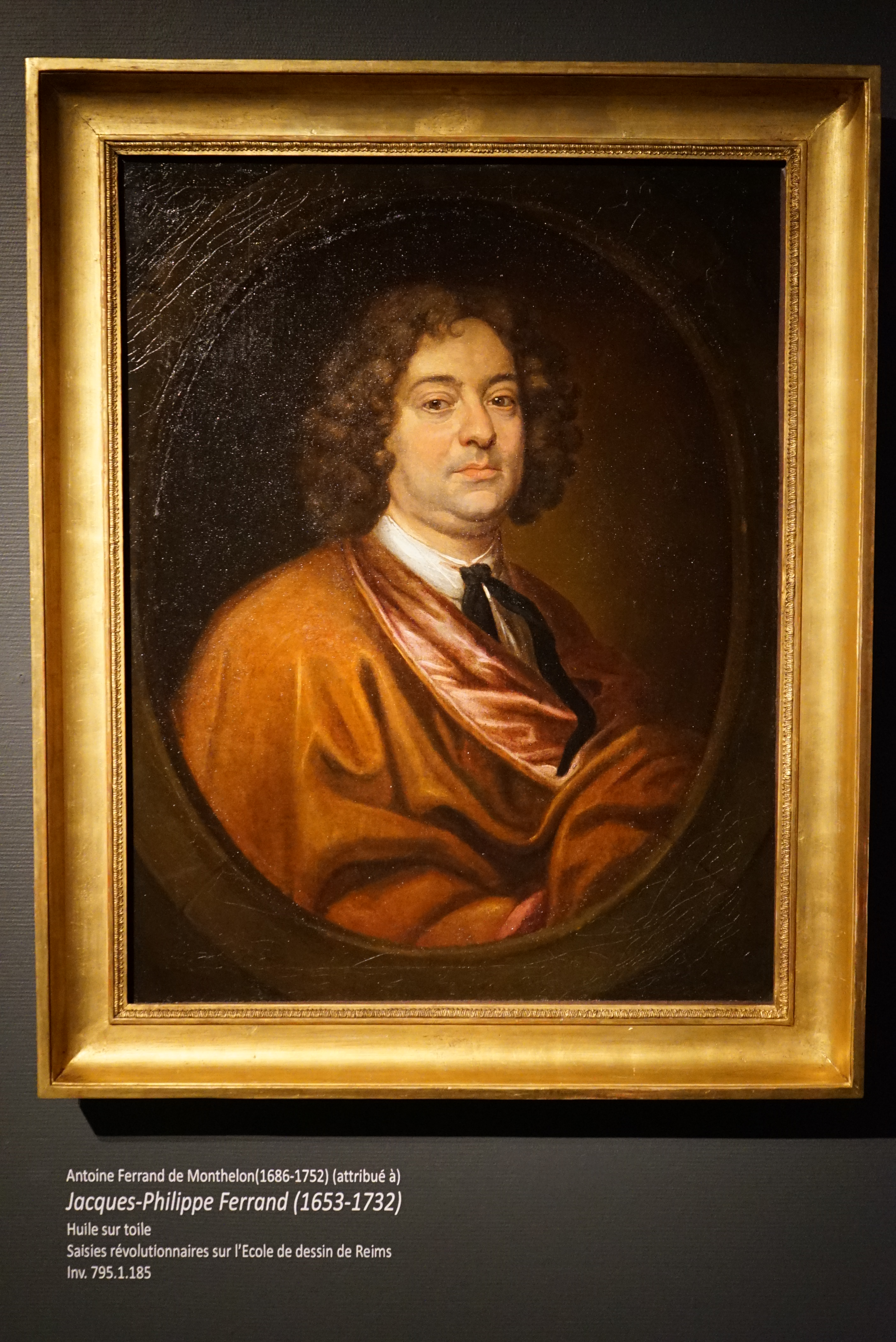
Jacques-Philippe by is son (?)

Jacques-Philippe Ferrand (1653–1732) was a French miniaturist and painter in enamel.

Ferrand was born at Joigny in the Province of Burgundy, the son of a physician to Louis XIII, and studied under Mignard and Samuel Bernard. In 1690 he was received into the Academy, on which occasion he painted a portrait of Louis XIV. He excelled in his art, and published in 1721 a work entitled, L'Art du feu, ou manière de peindre en émail. He travelled in Italy, England, and Germany, and died in Paris in 1732.
