= Troyes Cathedral =

Cathedral in Aube, France

Cathedral of Saint Peter and Saint Paul Cathédrale Saint-Pierre-et-Saint-Paul
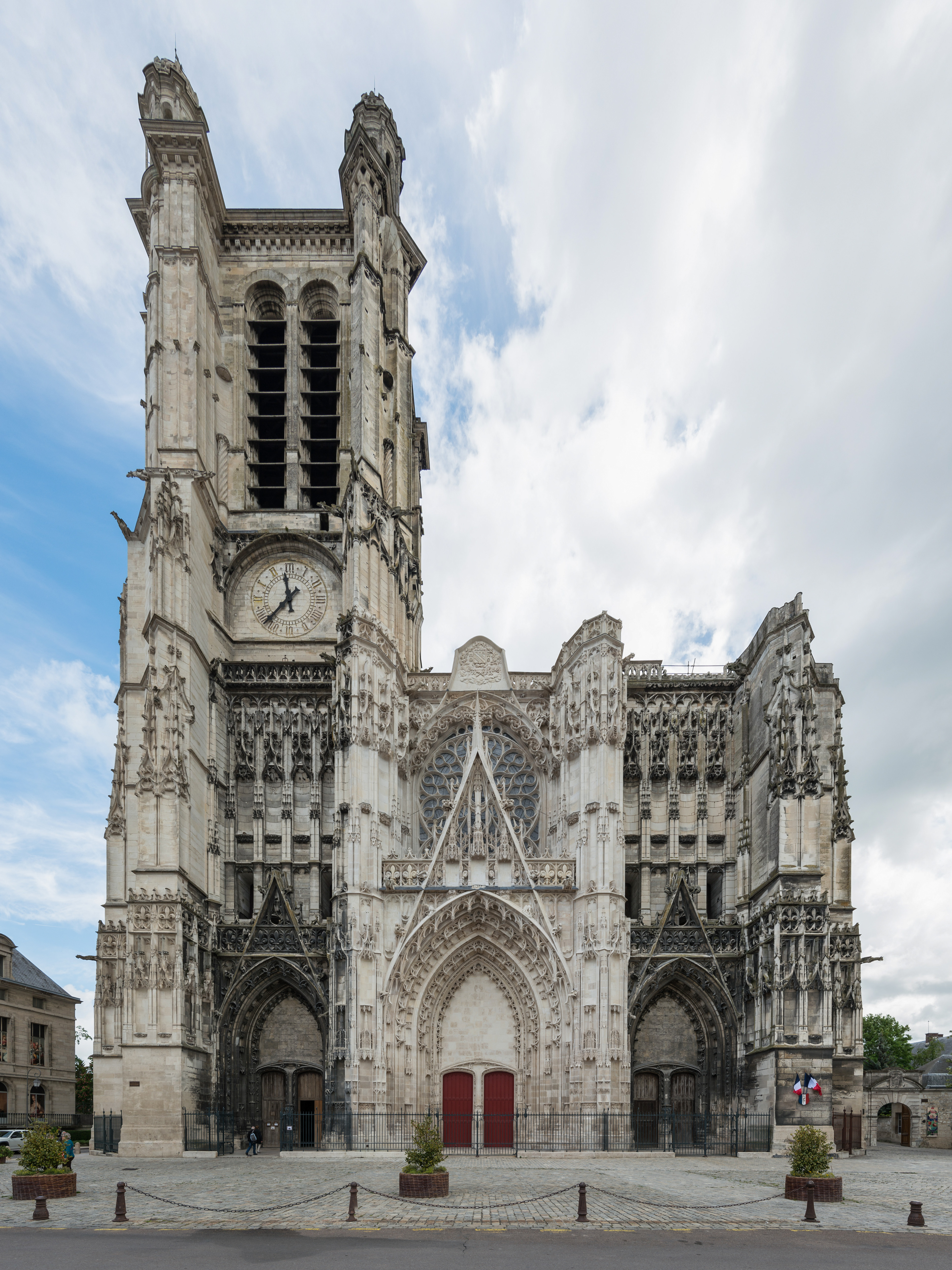
- West front of Troyes Cathedral

Religion
- Affiliation: Catholic Church
- Diocese: Diocese of Troyes
- Rite: Latin
- Ecclesiastical or organisational status: Cathedral

Location
- Location: Troyes, France
- Interactive map of Cathedral of Saint Peter and Saint Paul; Cathédrale Saint-Pierre-et-Saint-Paul
- Coordinates: 48°18′1″N 4°4′53″E

Architecture
- Type: Church
- Style: Gothic
- Groundbreaking: 1208
- Completed: 17th century

Troyes Cathedral (French: Cathédrale Saint-Pierre-et-Saint-Paul de Troyes) is a Catholic church, dedicated to Saint Peter and Saint Paul, located in the town of Troyes in Champagne, France. It is the episcopal seat of the Bishop of Troyes. The cathedral, in the Gothic architectural style, has been a listed monument historique since 1862.

== History ==
=== Earlier cathedrals ===
According to local church tradition, Christianity was carried to Troyes in the third century by the Bishop of Sens, Savinien, who sent Saint Potentien and Saint Sérotin to the town to establish the first church. The house where they lived is believed to have stood on the same site as the cathedral; and excavations in the 19th century found traces of Gallo-Roman building under the sanctuary. A 5th-century bishop of Troyes, Lupus was credited with saving Troyes from destruction by Huns by leading a delegation of clerics to appeal to Attila, in 451. An enamel of Lupus healing a deaf young woman is displayed in the cathedral; the old cathedral is visible in the background.

The first church was rebuilt and enlarged in the 9th century, but it was badly damaged by the Norman invasions at the end of the same century. It was rebuilt by Bishop Milo through about 980 in the Romanesque style. Fragments of the sculptural decoration of this old church were found in 1864 and are displayed in the south collateral aisle of the present church.

In the 12th century, the Romanesque church was enlarged with the addition of a bell tower and a chapel dedicated to the Virgin Mary. The church was the site of the Council of Troyes that opened on 13 January 1129, hosted by Pope Honorius II. At the urging of Saint Bernard of Clairvaux, the Council granted official status to the Order of the Knights Templar, which became immensely influential throughout Christendom.

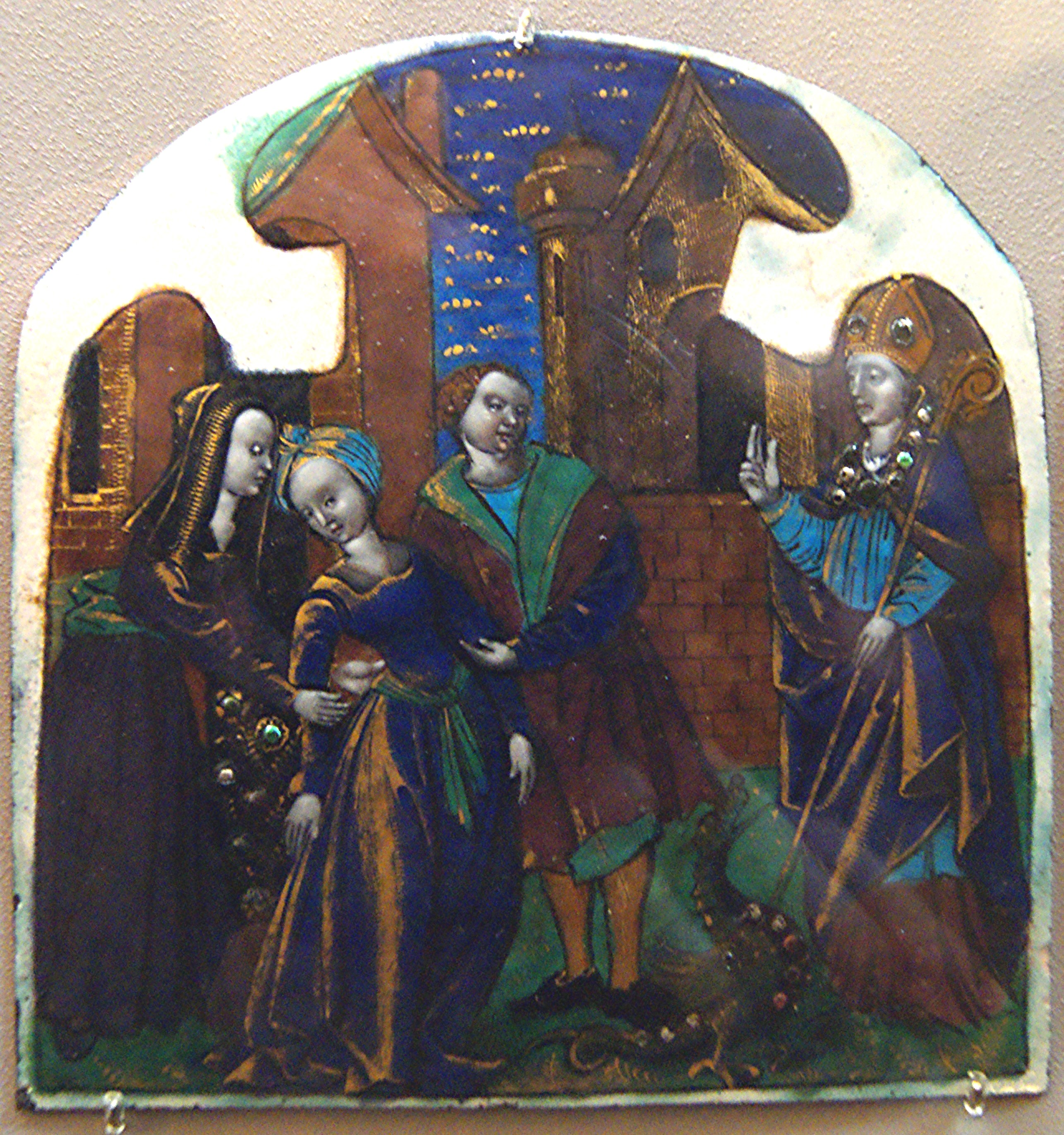
An enamel of Lupus of Troyes, a 5th-century bishop, healing a deaf woman. The old Cathedral is visible in the background.

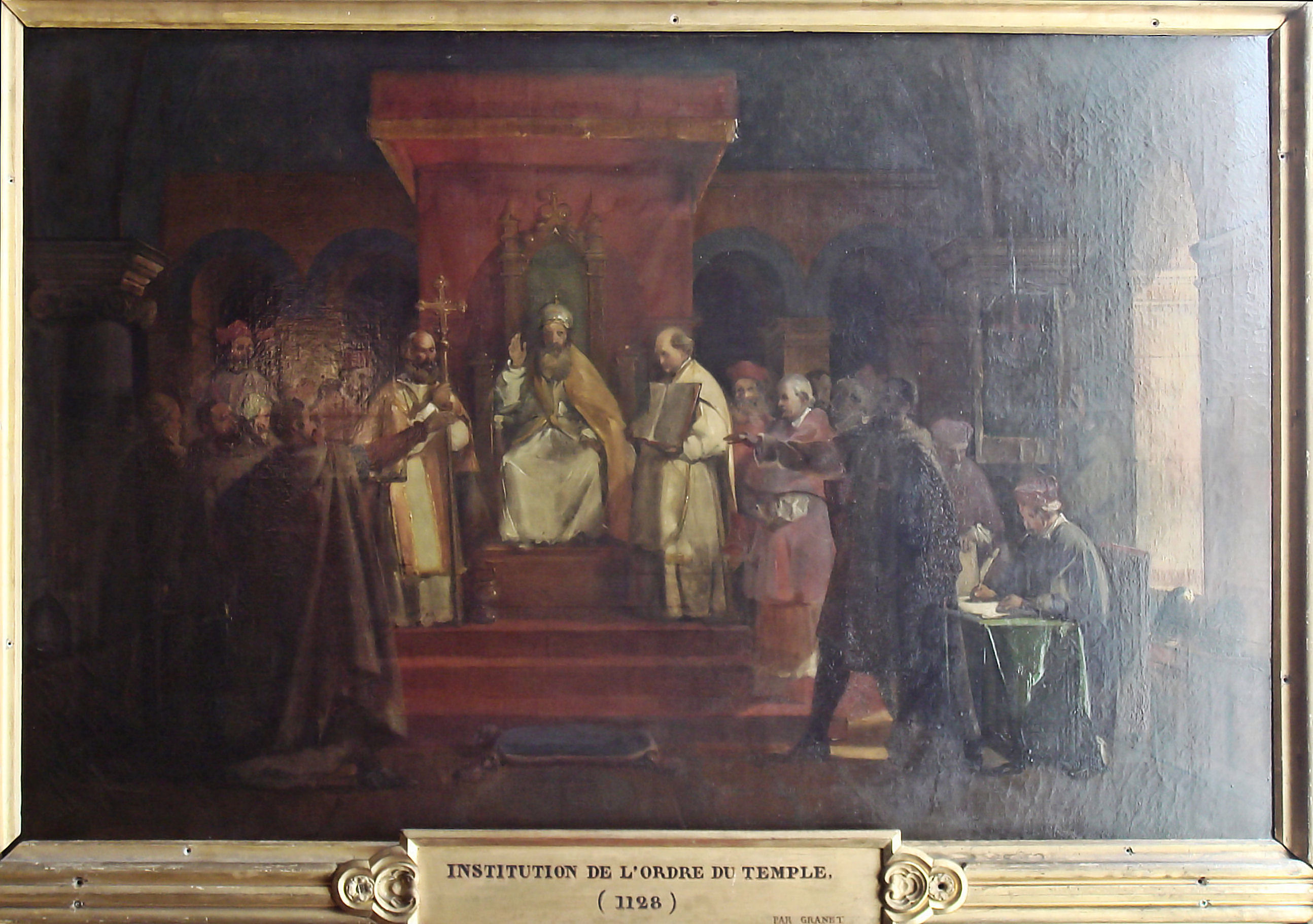
The Council of Troyes grants official status to Order of the Knights Templar (1129)

=== Gothic cathedral ===
In 1188 a fire destroyed much of the town, and badly damaged the cathedral. Reconstruction began in 1199 or 1200, started by Bishop Garnier de Traînel. Once the construction was underway, the Bishop departed on the Fourth Crusade in 1204, and brought back to Troyes a collection of precious relics for the cathedral treasury.

The new church was constructed in the Early Gothic style, inspired by the earlier Basilica of Saint Denis and Sens Cathedral, and by Chartres Cathedral and Notre Dame de Paris, which both were under construction at the same time. Work was well along by 1220 when the lower portions were completed and the upper walls were begun. Unfortunately, in 1228 a hurricane struck the half-finished structure, destroying the lower collateral aisle on the south side of the choir and damaging the upper walls. The upper walls were rebuilt between 1235 and 1240, and the builders took advantage of the extra time to adopt a more modern element first used at the Basilica of Saint-Denis; they filled the walls of the triforium, at the midlevel of the wall, with stained glass, bringing an abundance of light into the middle of the church.

The transept was finally vaulted in about 1310, and the spire was raised over the transept, but due to a series of economic difficulties, work slowed down. In 1365 a tornado destroyed the spire of the transept; it was not restored until 1437. More seriously, in 1389 the roof of the nave was struck by lightning, starting a fire that damaged the masonry below. This led in 1390 to the collapse of the rose window of the north transept. The rose was replaced and reinforced in 1408–9, but forty years later again showed signs of weakness. It was reinforced with a stone bar, and the portals were reinforced with new buttresses. Work resumed in 1450 under Bishop Louis Reguier, who worked to complete the upper portions of the nave.

=== Flamboyant and Renaissance additions (15th–17th century) ===
On 21 May 1420, the Treaty of Troyes was signed in the cathedral between Henry V of England, his ally Philip of Burgundy and Queen Isabel, wife of the mad Charles VI of France whereby the throne of France would pass to Henry on the death of Charles rather than to Charles' son the Dauphin. Henry married Catherine of Valois, the French king's daughter, shortly afterwards in Troyes, either at the cathedral or the church of St Jean.

In July 1429, Joan of Arc escorted the Dauphin to Mass in the cathedral en route to proclaiming him Charles VII of France at Reims Cathedral, in contravention of the recently signed Treaty of Troyes.

At the beginning of the 16th century, a new building campaign began, this time in the late Gothic Flamboyant style. It was conducted by the master builder Martin Chambiges, whose works included the transepts of Sens Cathedral (1494), Beauvais Cathedral (1499) and Senlis Cathedral (1530). The new west front he designed followed the model of Reims Cathedral and other 13th century cathedrals, with three portals separated by strong buttresses, each topped by a high pointed arch.

The first level of the west front was finished by 1531–1432. The 12th-century bell tower and porch was demolished. The two levels were complete by 1554, and work began on the towers. Work on the north tower, called the Saint-Pierre tower, went slowly; it was not finished until 1634, and had just two of the smaller clochetons or steeples on the top corners instead of the four planned. The planned south tower was never started.

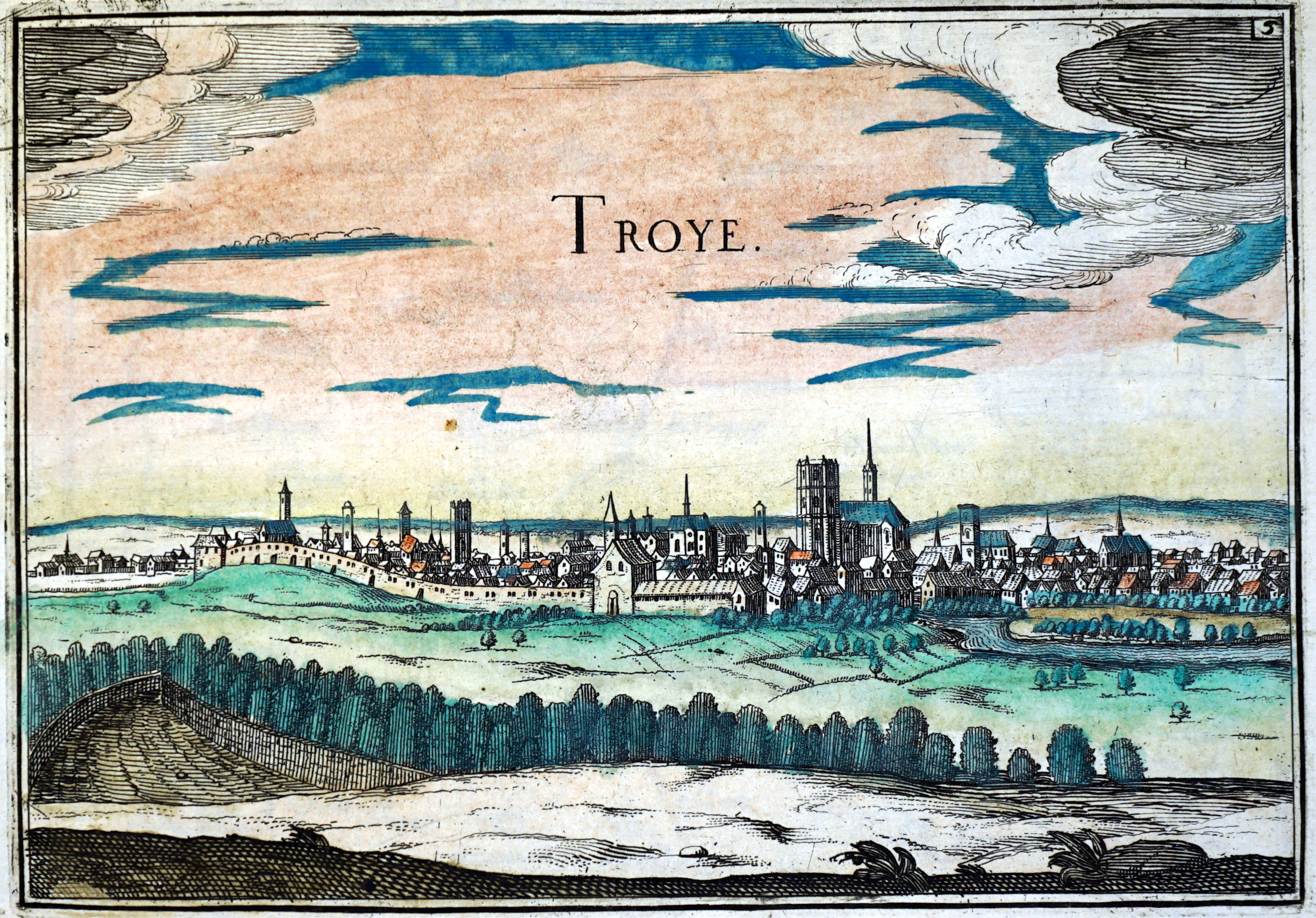
Troyes Cathedral in 1634

=== Vandalism and preservation (19th–20th century) ===
The cathedral suffered major damage during the French Revolution. The west front was particularly targeted; the sculptures that filled the tympanum over each portal were smashed. The lower stained glass windows in the choir were destroyed or taken apart. Fortunately, many of the upper windows were spared and still have their original glass. On January 9–10, 1794, a jeweller named Rondot led a mob that looted the treasury, seizing and melting down the previous gold and silver sacred objects.

During the rest of the 19th and 20th centuries, the cathedral underwent several campaigns of restoration. In 1840 the wall of the south transept, built on an unstable foundation, had to be reinforced to prevent it from collapsing, and between 1849 and 1866 all of the walls on the east side and then the pillars of the choir were reinforced. Many of the 13th-century windows were restored and put back into place. During both the First and Second World Wars, the stained glass was removed and put into safe storage, and the building suffered no significant harm. Restoration and repair of the west facade continued into the 21st century.

== Plans and dimensions ==
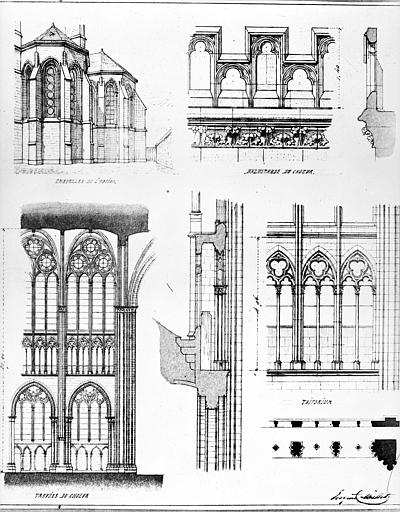
Elevations

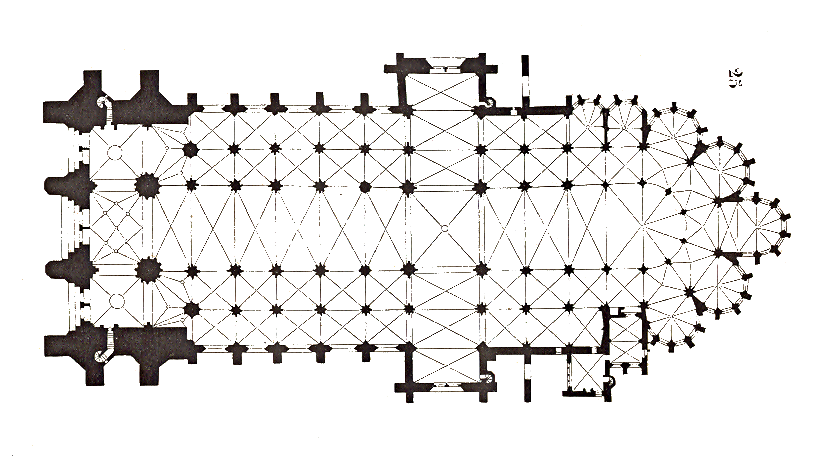
Plan of the cathedral

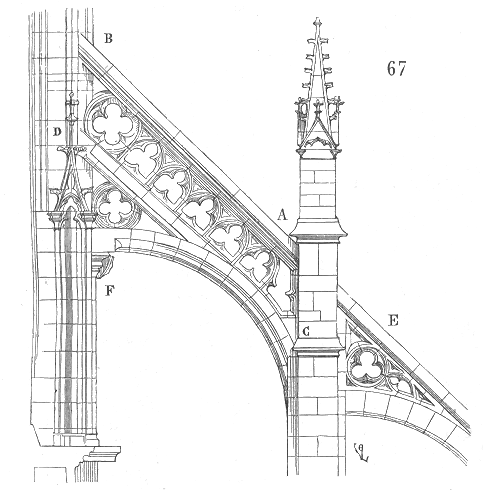
Flying buttress, drawn by Eugène Viollet-le-Duc

The cathedral, containing the nave, choir and apse with radiating chapels, has two principal aisles and two further subsidiary aisles. It is 114 metres (379 feet 6 inches) long and 50 metres (162 feet 6 inches) wide (across the transepts), with a height from the top of the vault of 29.5 metres (96 feet); the height of the cupola and the tower is 62.34 metres (202 feet 7 inches). The surface area of 1,500 m^{2} (16,000 sq. ft.),

== Exterior ==
=== West Front ===
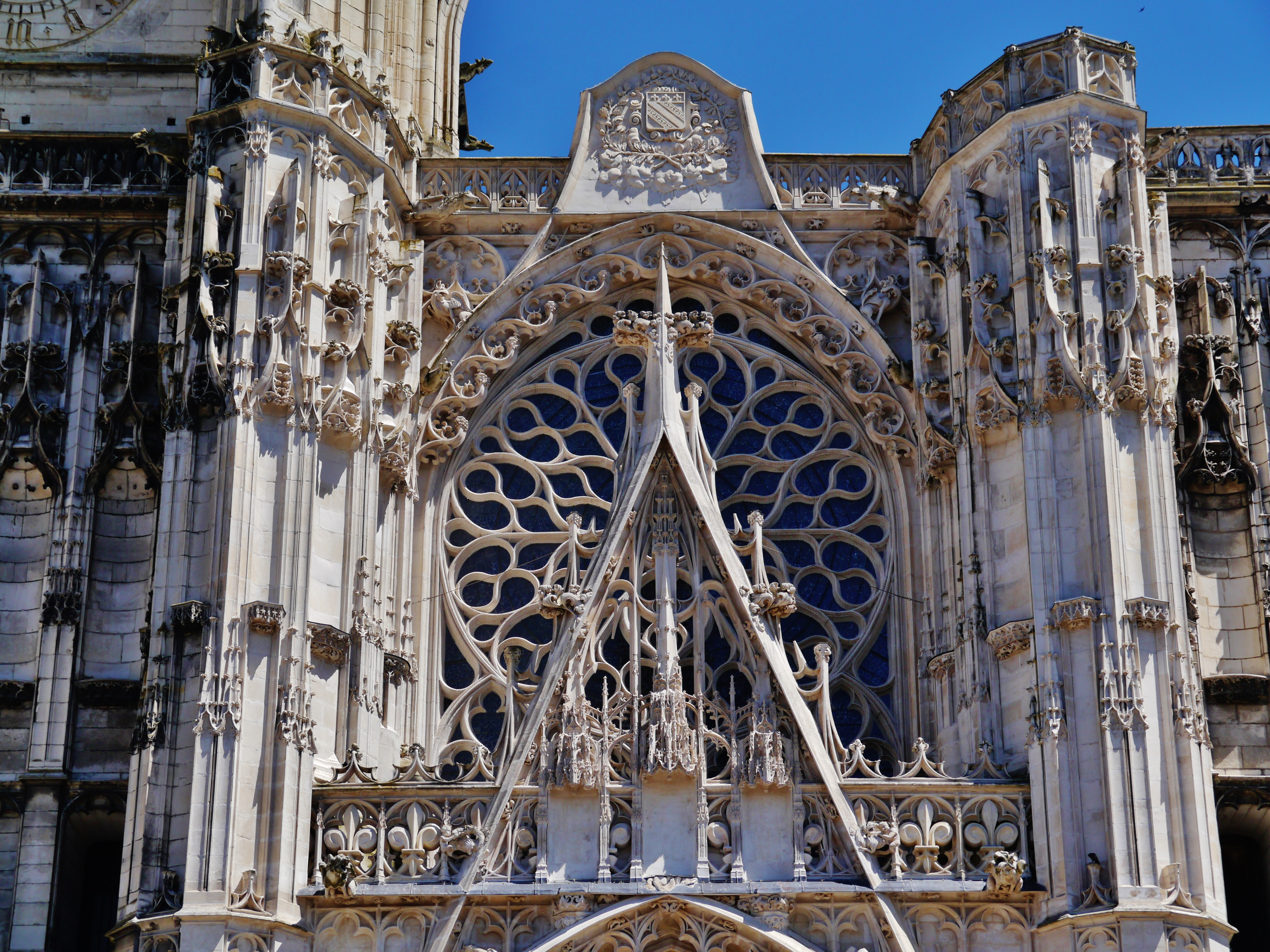
Upper west front, over the central portal

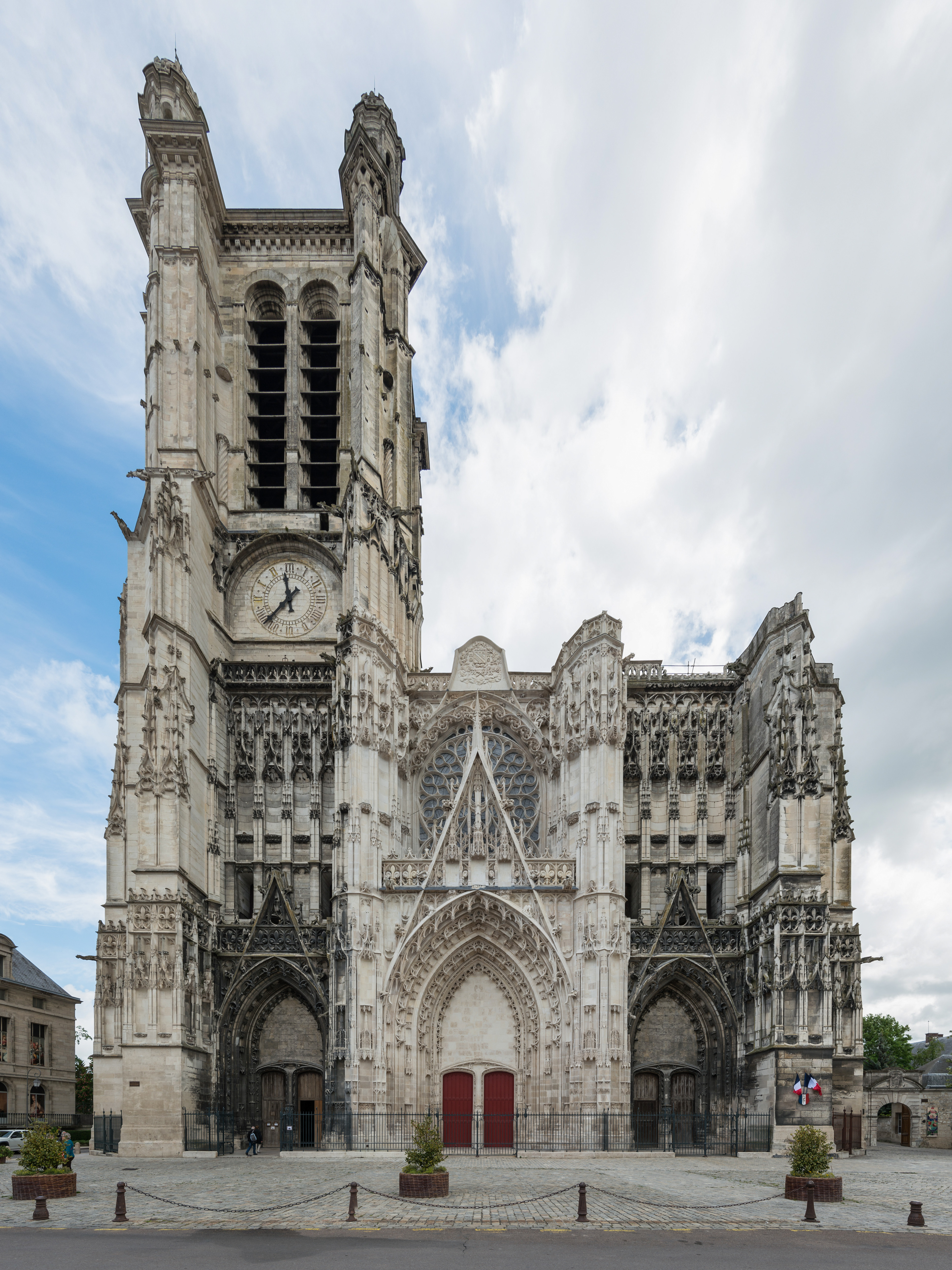
The west front and north tower

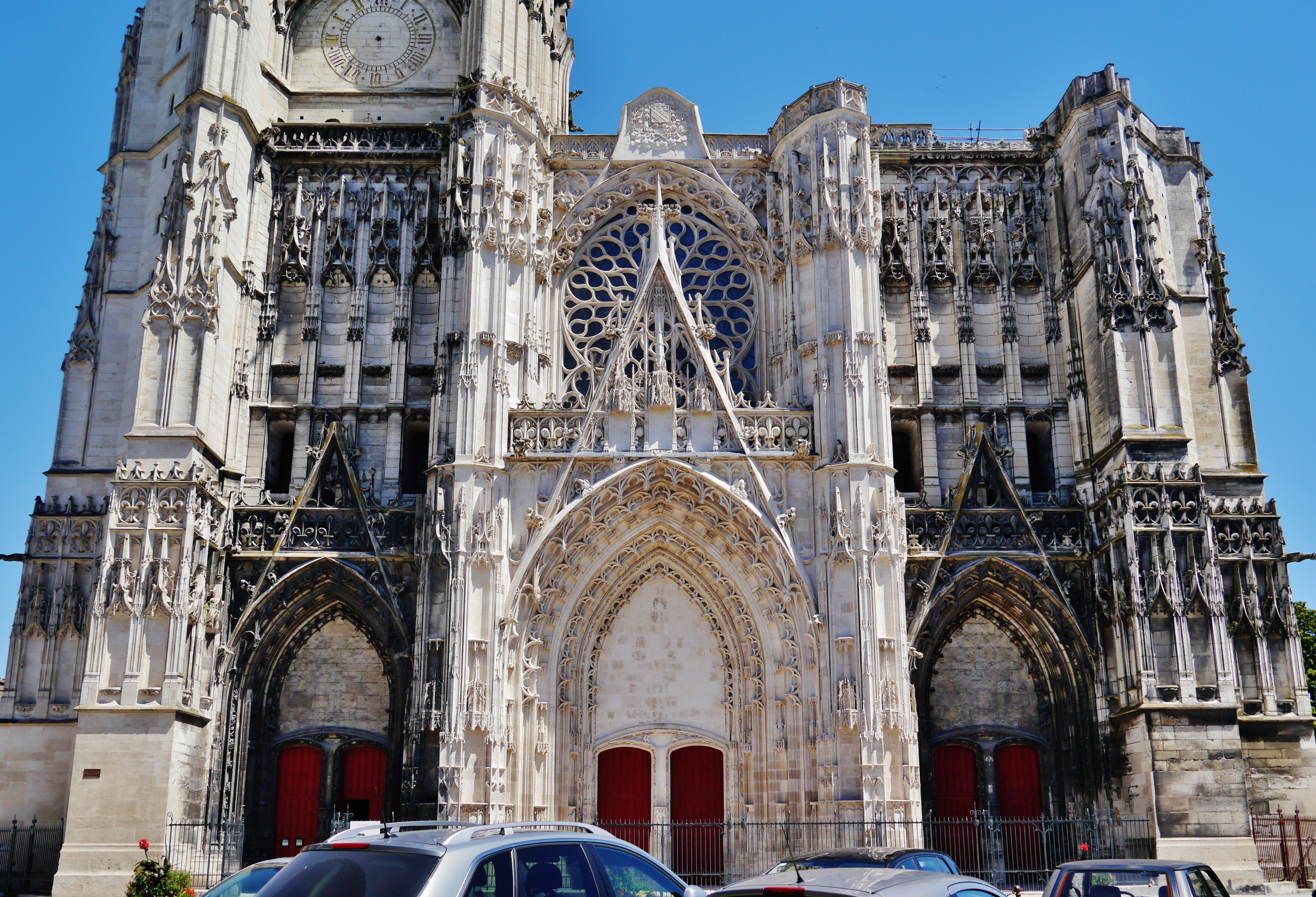
The full west front

The west front of the cathedral, with the three portals which serve as main entrances, was almost entirely redone beginning in 1507 in the Flamboyant style by master builder Martin Chambiges. It is divided into vertical sections containing the portals by four massive vertical buttresses and covered with elaborate arcades and tracery. Each of the three portals is crowned by a high pointed gable. The gable over the central portal originally held statues of the Virgin Mary, Saint John and Saint Mary Madeleine. An immense flamboyant rose window fills the space over the central portal. On top of the rose window, interrupting the balustrade, is the coat of arms of the city of Troyes

The west front suffered the most damage during the Revolution. The tympanum over the central entrance, which originally contained scenes from the Passion of Christ is bare; the statuary was smashed. The voussures and embracements that frame the portals preserve the original lavish vegetal decoration. The many niches and galleries on the west front contained statues, which were also destroyed, though the fleur-de-lis royal emblems on the balustrades remain. The sculpture of the tympanums of the north and south portals originally celebrated the lives of Saint Peter and Saint Paul, the two patron saints of the cathedral. These were also destroyed during the Revolution.

The north and only tower, finished in 1634, is built in a more classical Renaissance style. It has two narrow windows on each side, between the supporting buttresses. each side, and decoration of slender columns. The top has a balustrade with two cupolas. An arch was planned to connect the two towers, and its foundation was built, but the south tower was never constructed.

=== North and south sides and transepts ===
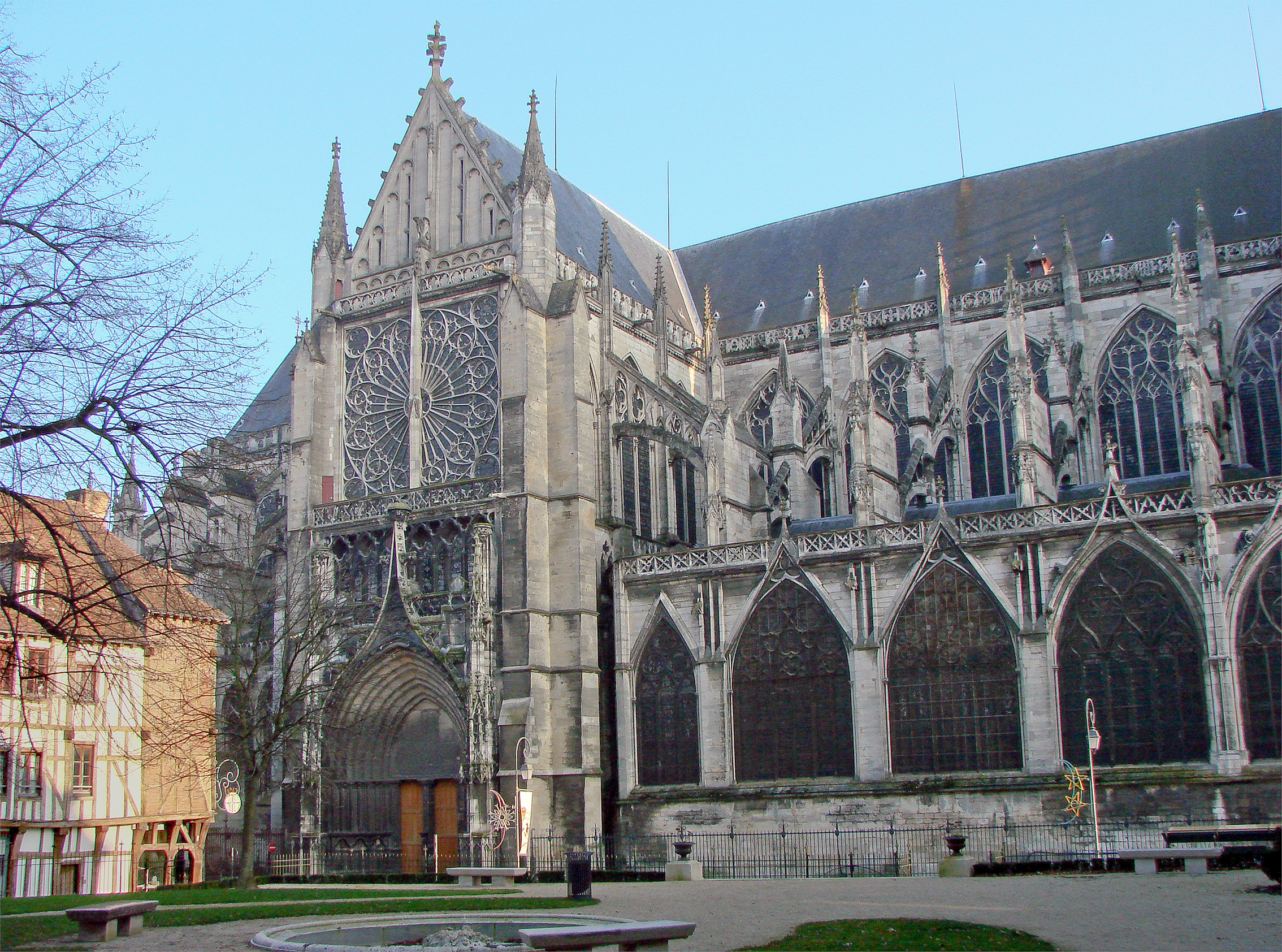
The north transept

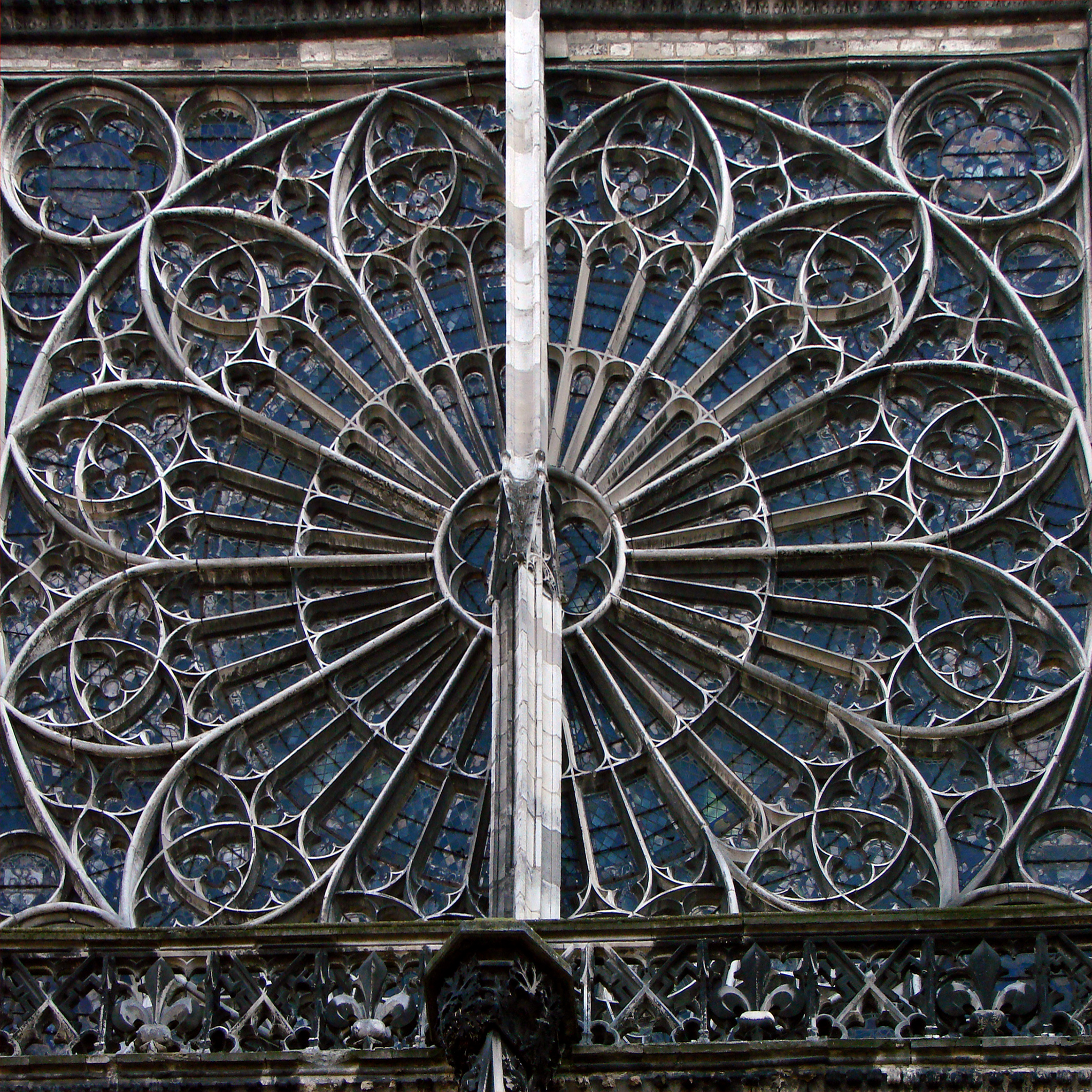
The north transept rose window (early 15th century) with a stone bar added to secure it.

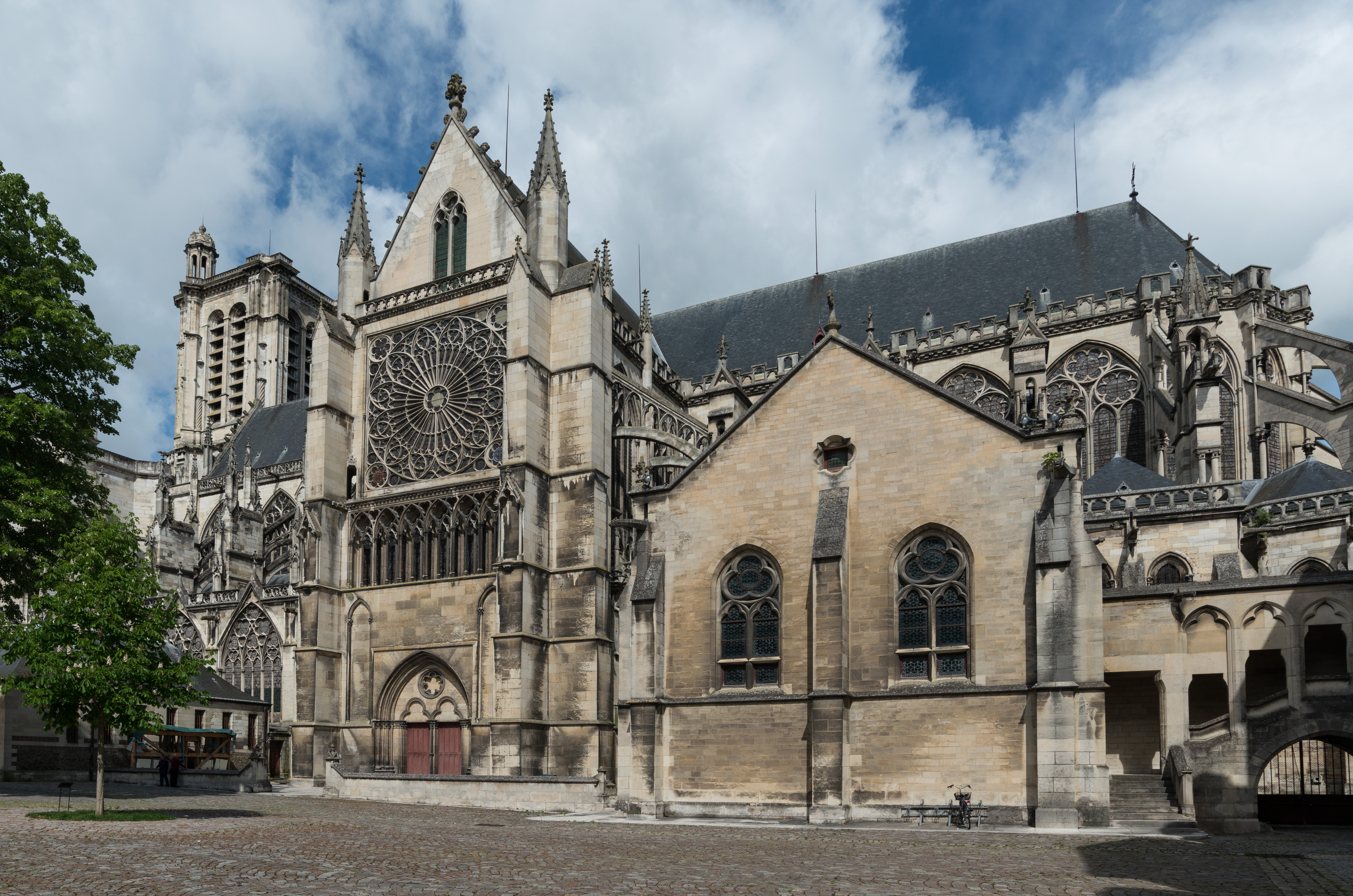
The south side and transept. The chapter house is to the right of the transept.

The north and south walls of the cathedral are supported by high flying buttresses, given additional weight by stone pinnacles. The walls are divided midway by the north and south transepts. The space between the buttresses is almost entirely filled by small chapels, lower than the central vessel of the nave and choir. A balustrade connects the roofs of the chapels, and another balustrade runs along the edge of the upper wall, at the base of the roof. The tracery of high windows and of the chapels, especially those closer to the west end of the cathedral, is flamboyant and elaborate, while the tracery toward the east end, built in the 13th and beginning of the 14th century, is simpler.

Midway along the sides are the two transepts, which protrude just beyond the chapels on either side of them. They were built in the 13th century, and each was originally decorated with sculpture in the tympanum, and in the voussures of the arches over the portals. The south portal sculpture depicted the Last Judgement and Apocalypse. The transept sculpture, like that of the west front, was destroyed during the Revolution. A few pieces are preserved in the Musée des beaux-arts de Troyes.

The north transept underwent major rebuilding. The buttresses with pinnacles were added in the 15th century, along with lancet and quadrafoil windows in the triforium, or middle level. and a balustrade with ornament representing the keys of Saint Peter. The original rose window of the transept fell in 1390, and was replaced with a Rayonnant window in the early 15th century. Later in the same century, a vertical stone bar was placed in front of the rose window to secure it.

The original south transept from the 13th century collapsed and was entirely rebuilt between 1841 and 1844. The rose window was made identical to that in the north facade, and the decoration was simplified.

=== Chevet ===
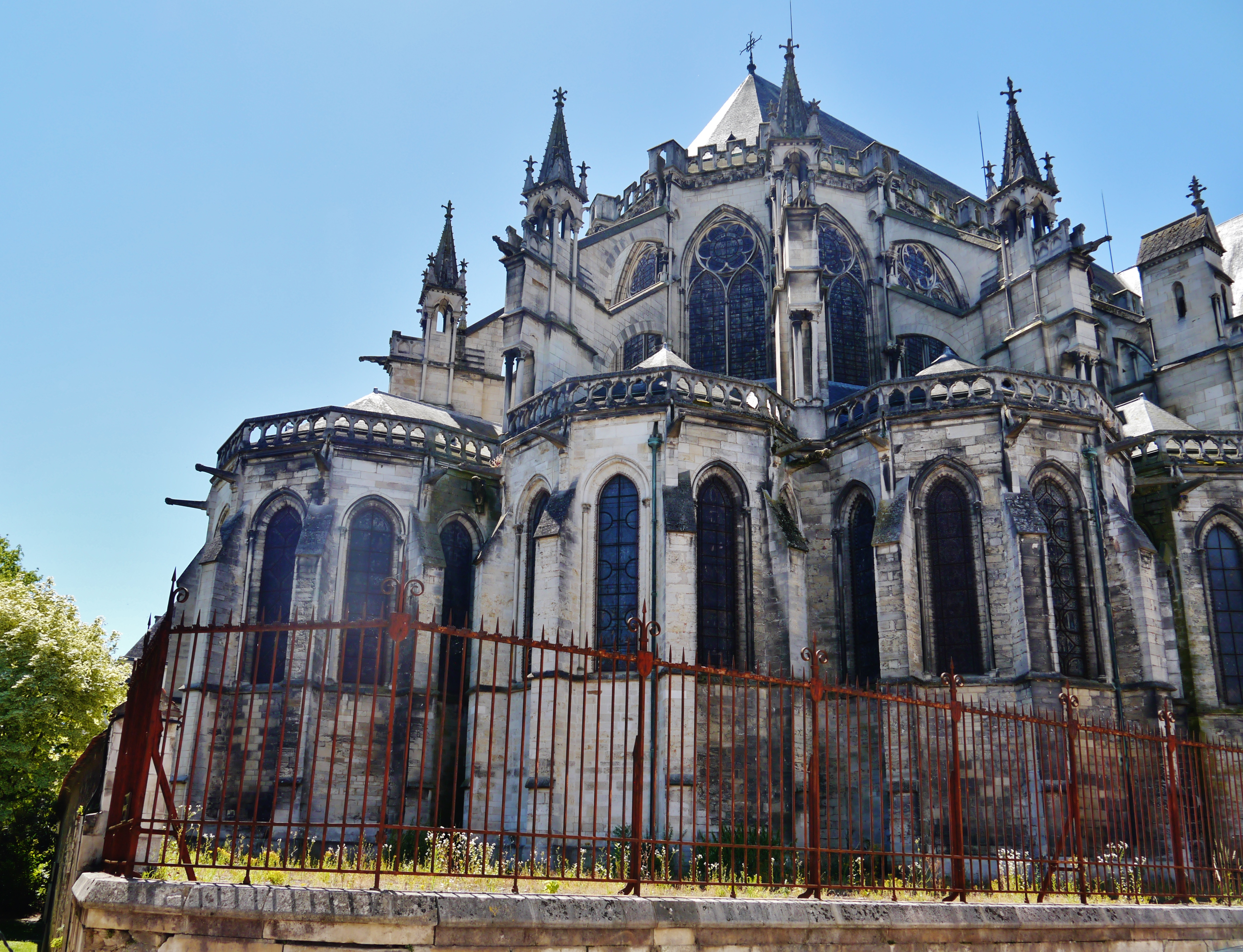
The chevet with radiating chapels

The chevet or east front has six chapels placed between the flying buttresses which form a half-circle around the apse. The buttresses, which made a double leap to the top of the walls, are topped with spires, pinnacles and sculpture to give them extra weight. They were constructed in the 19th century, replacing simpler earlier buttresses. An elaborate balustrade rings the roofline. The windows of the upper level, each composed of two large lancets and one to three small rose windows, retain their original plan. Another elaborate balustrade rings the roofline.

== Interior ==
The interior of the central vessel of the cathedral is covered by traverses of six-part rib vaults, supported by slender columns descending to the lower level, where they grouped around and supported by massive pillars. The central vessel has three levels; the arcades of large pointed arches on the ground floor; a more narrow triforium, or gallery, with windows on the outside; and an upper level filled with large windows that reach upward to the vaults. This arrangement is consistent from the west to the east, giving remarkable unity to the interior.

=== Nave ===
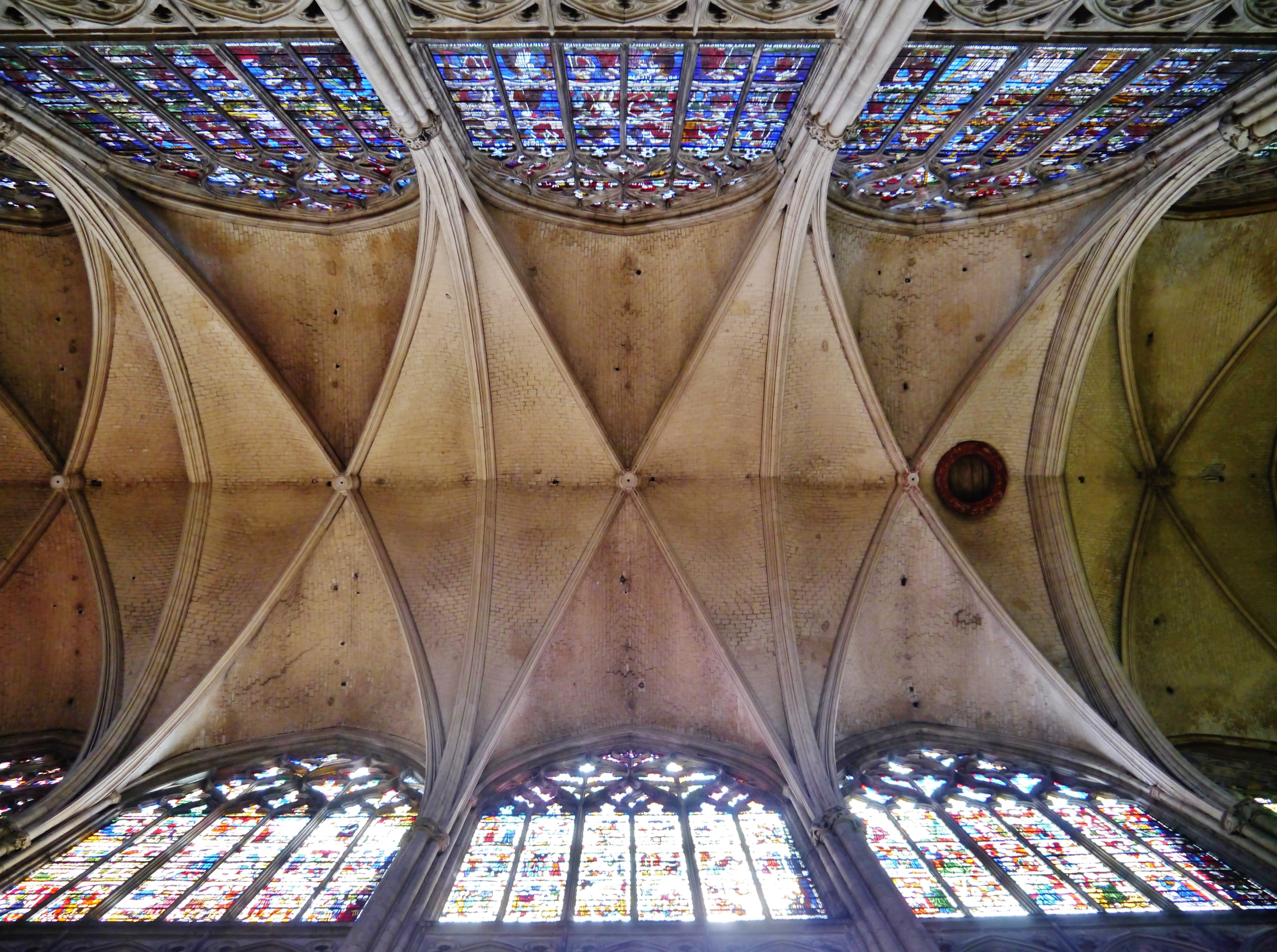
Vaults of the nave

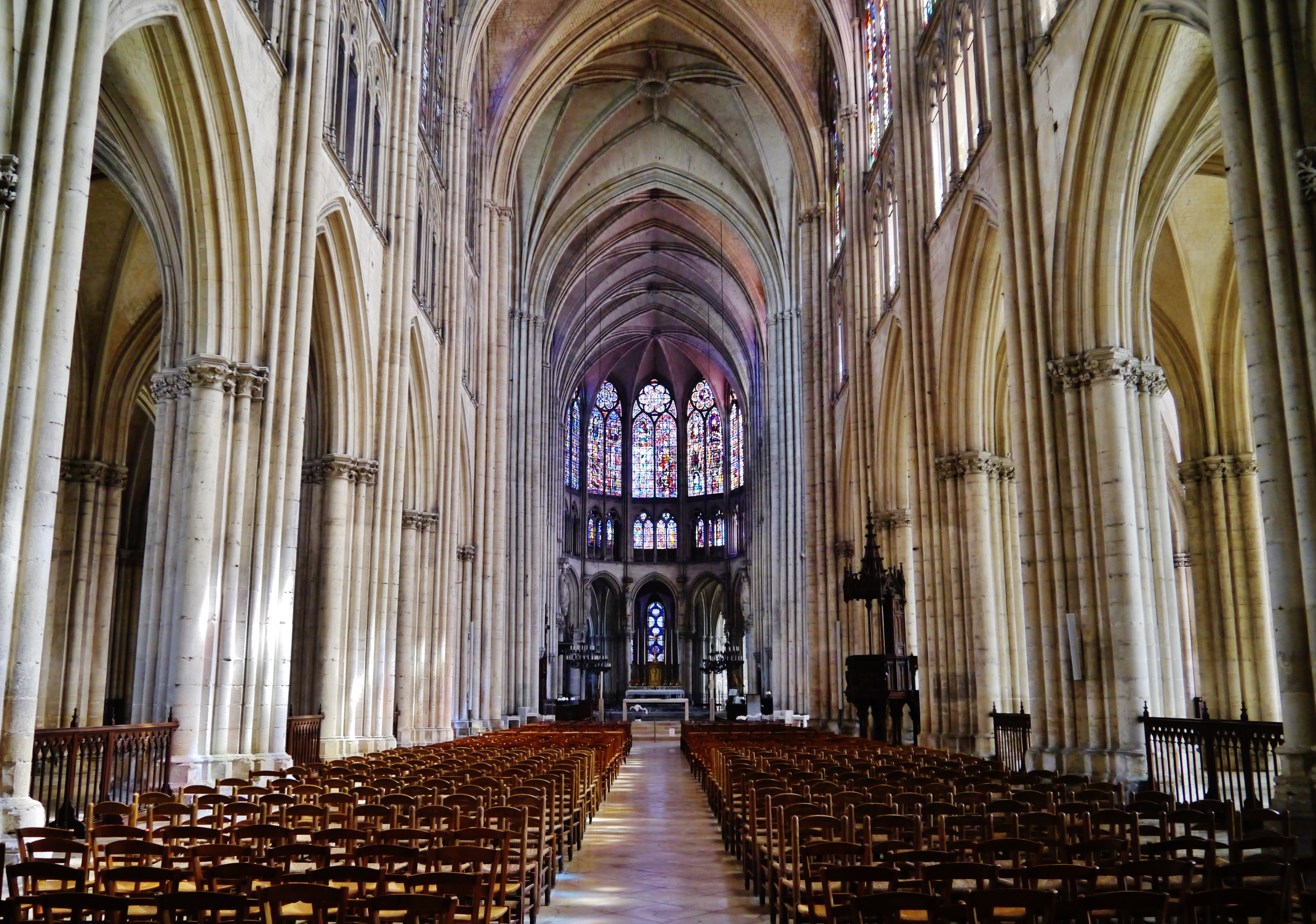
The nave, looking east

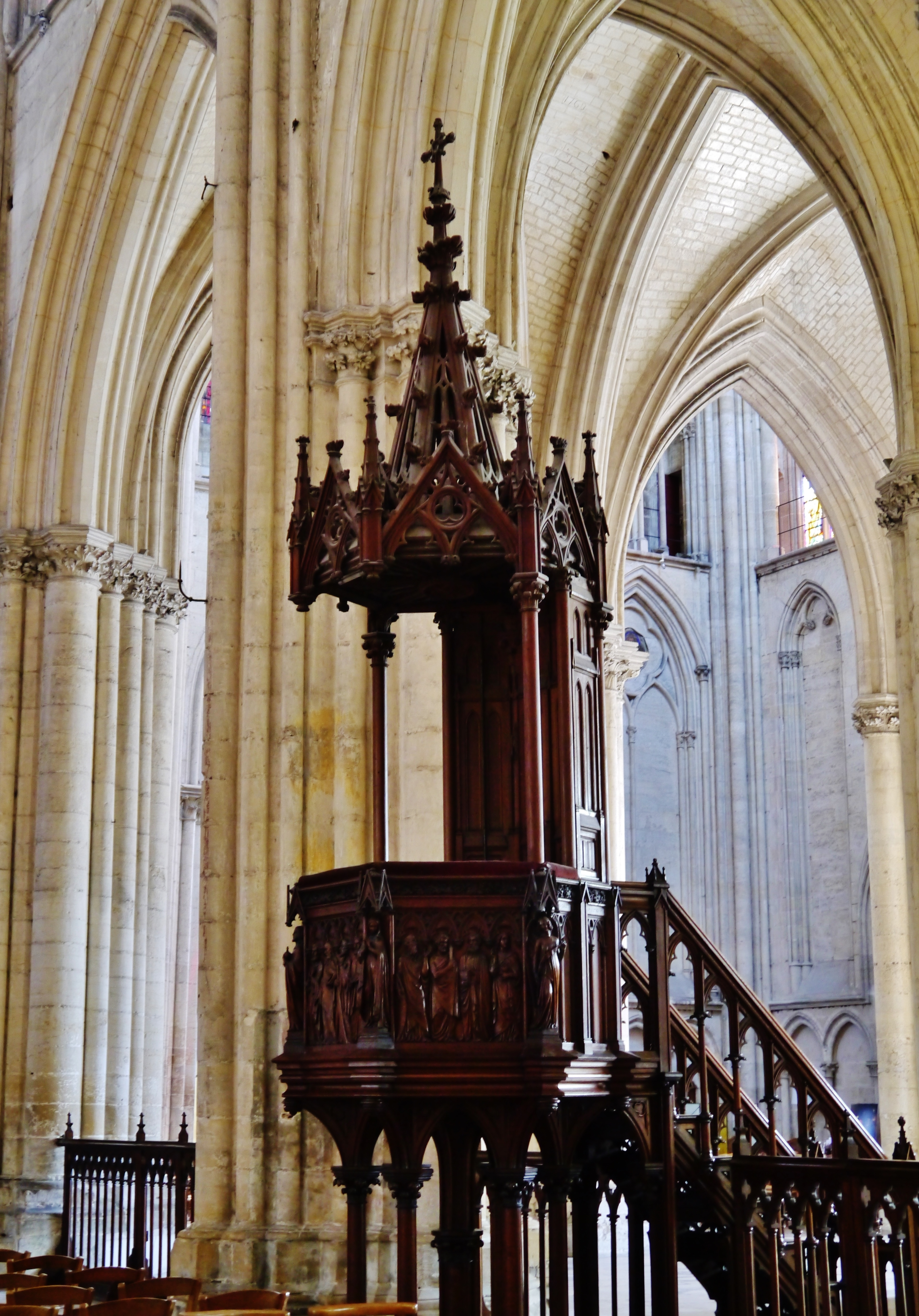
Pulpit

The nave, where ordinary worshippers were seated, is covered by seven traverses of vaults, extending as far as the transept. The pillars and columns at the western end are more recent, from the 15th and 16th centuries, and their capitals are decorated with more realistic floral sculpture. In the eastern portions, including the choir, the capitals have 13th-century crochets and other older Gothic decoration.

The 19th-century carved wood pulpit is found in the 6th traverse of the nave. It was designed by the architect Gounod in the spirit of the 13th and 14th centuries and completed by the sculptor Henri Triqueti in 1845.

=== Transept and choir ===
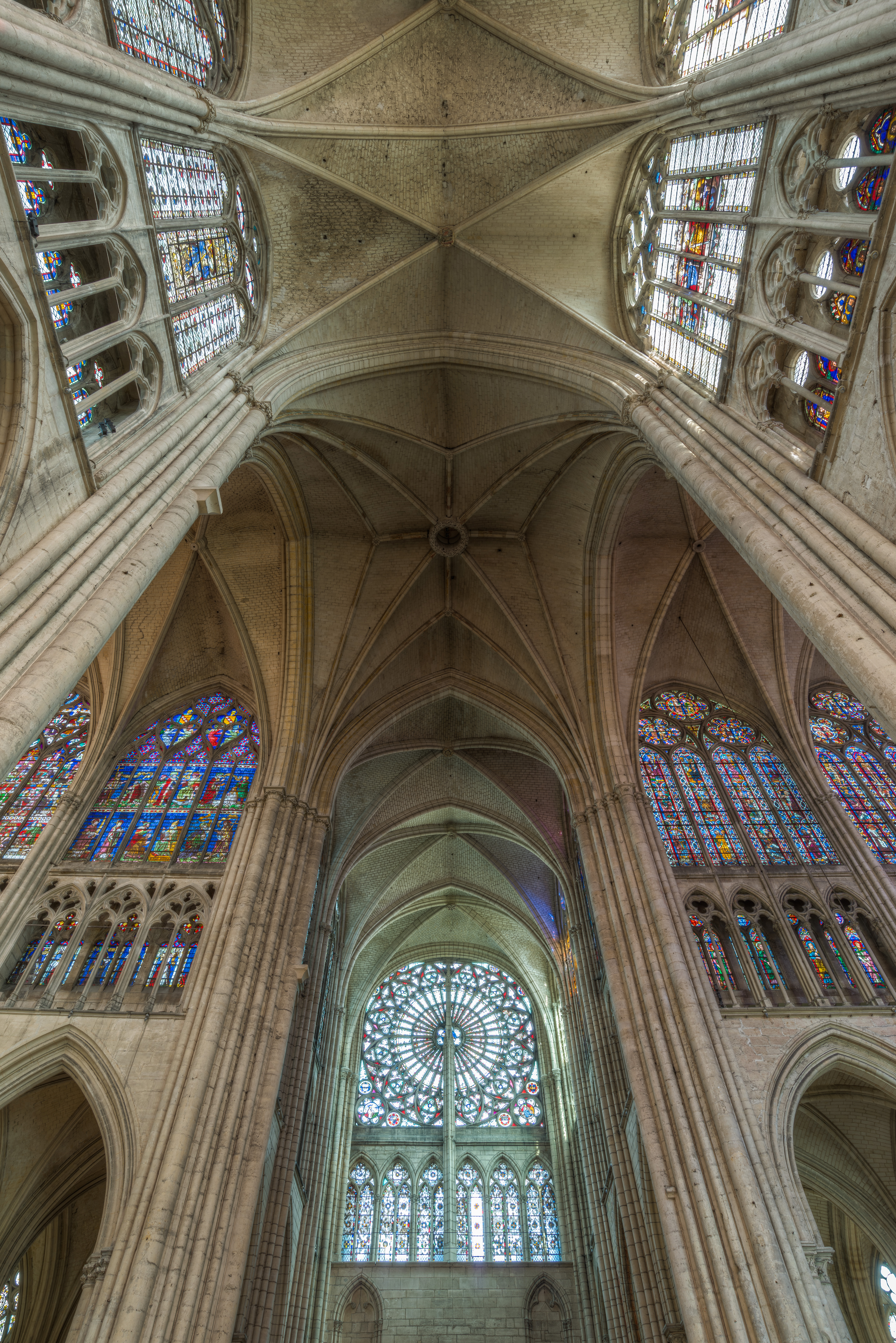
Vaults of the transept

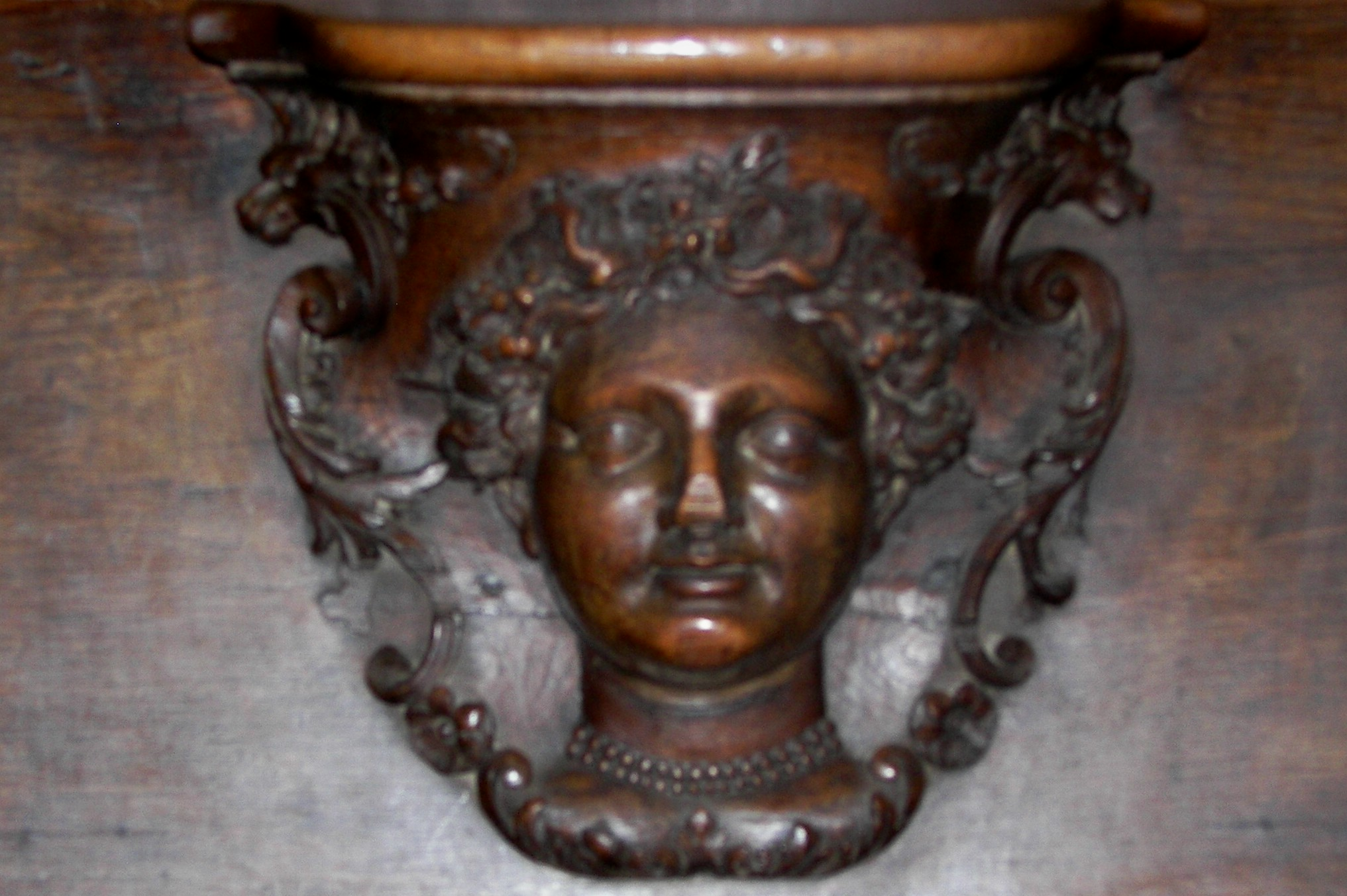
Carved figure of divine mercy, originally from Clairvaux Abbey, on a choir stall

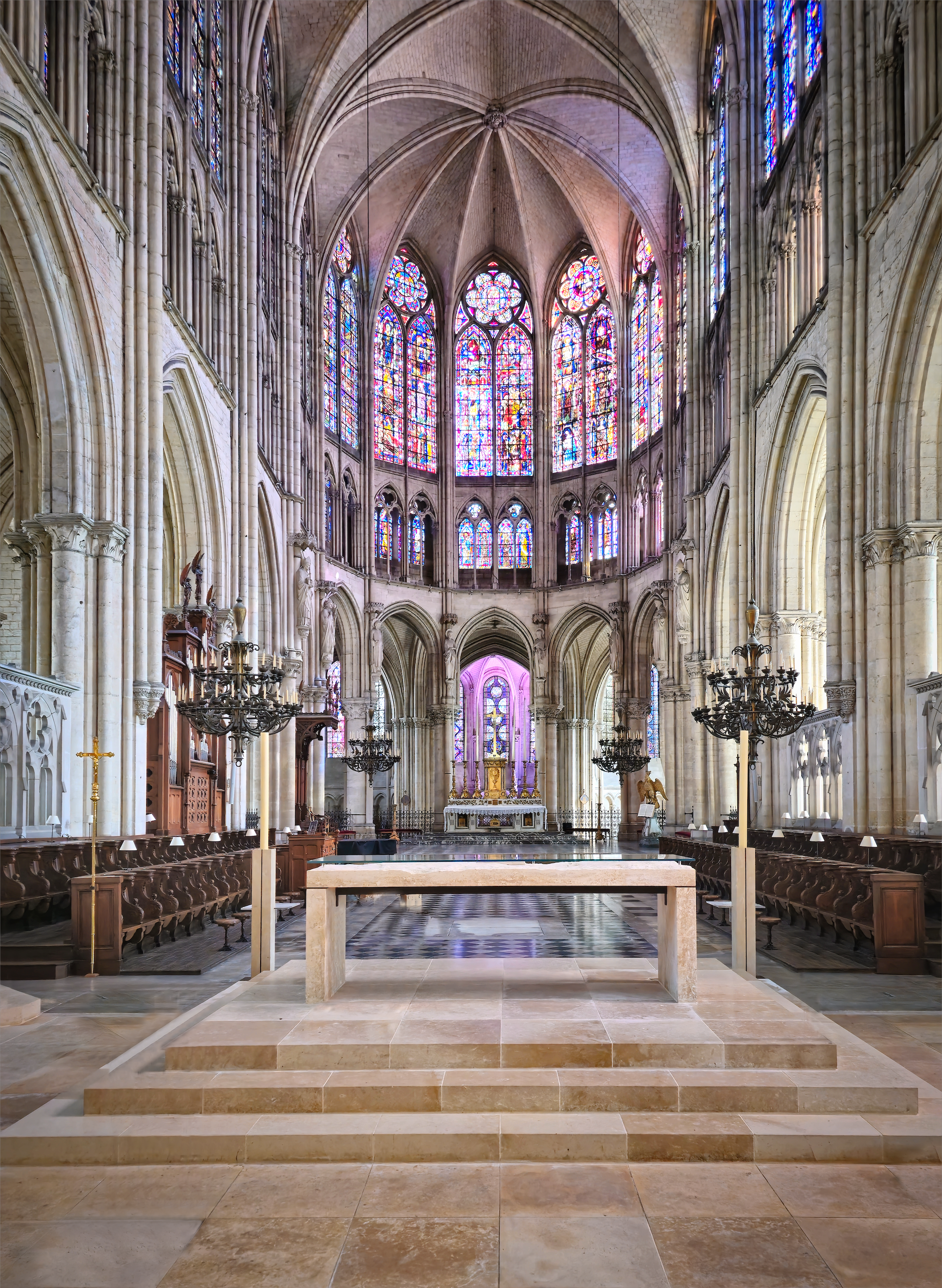
Altar and choir

The transept dates largely to the 13th century, and originally supported a tall spire, which was destroyed by fire in 1700. The ceiling vaults were rebuilt in the late Gothic style with ornamental extra ribs, in a form called a Lierne vault or star vault. The north rose window, ten meters in diameter, was remade in the 15th century and reinforced in its center by a stone bar. The south window is a 19th-century copy of the north window.

The choir is the location of the altar and the portion of the church reserved for the use of the clergy. It includes the sanctuary, where the altar is located, surrounded by an ornamental screen from the 19th century. The white marble altar was designed by the architect Jean Henri Gentilz in 1779, and gilded in 1786, shortly before the French Revolution. The carved wooden choir stalls were originally made for Clairvaux Abbey. When the abbey was largely destroyed during the French Revolution, the stalls, as well as the organ, were nationalised and were eventually purchased for Troyes Cathedral, and were installed in 1802.

=== Collateral aisles and chapels ===
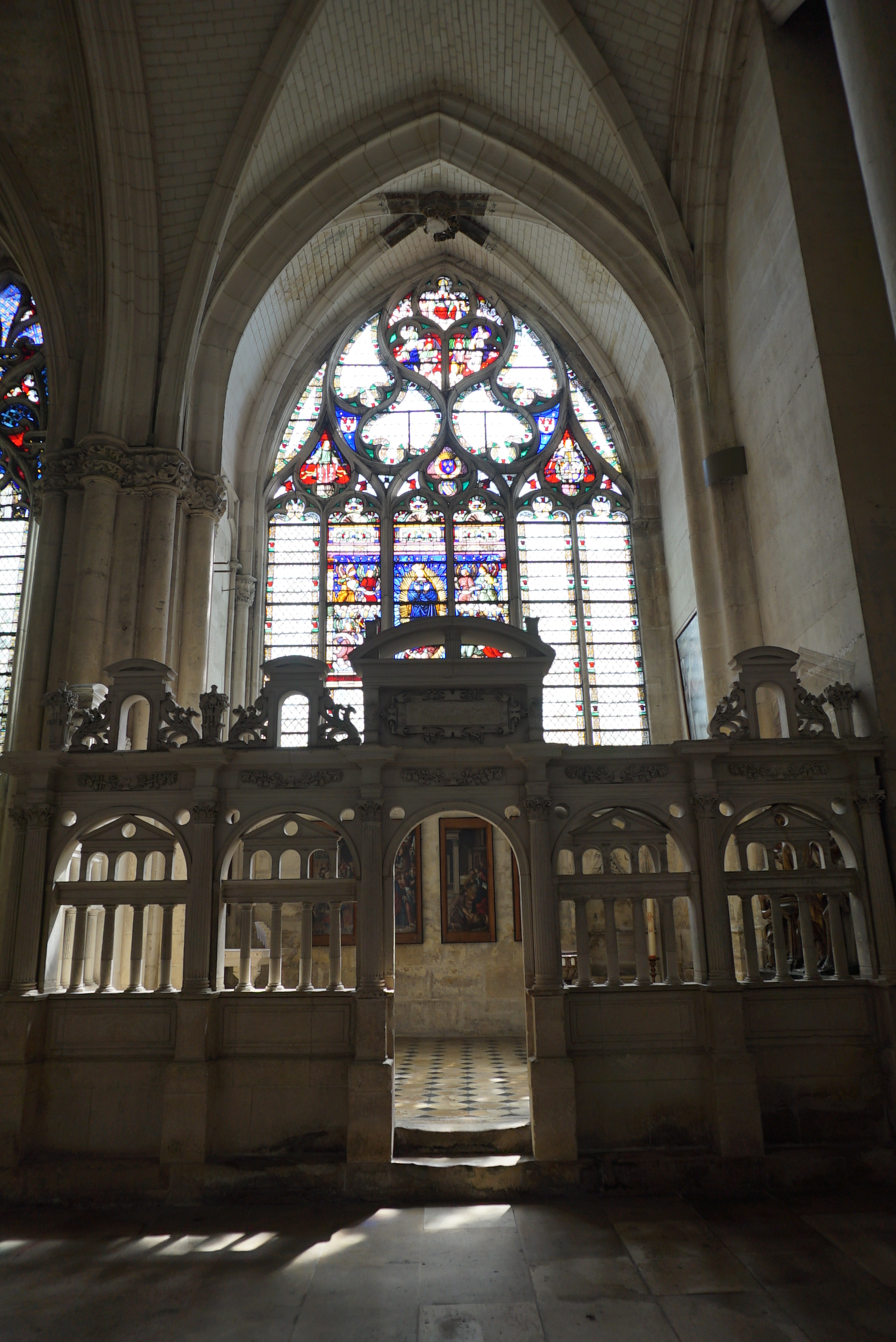
Enclosure of the Baptismal Chapel

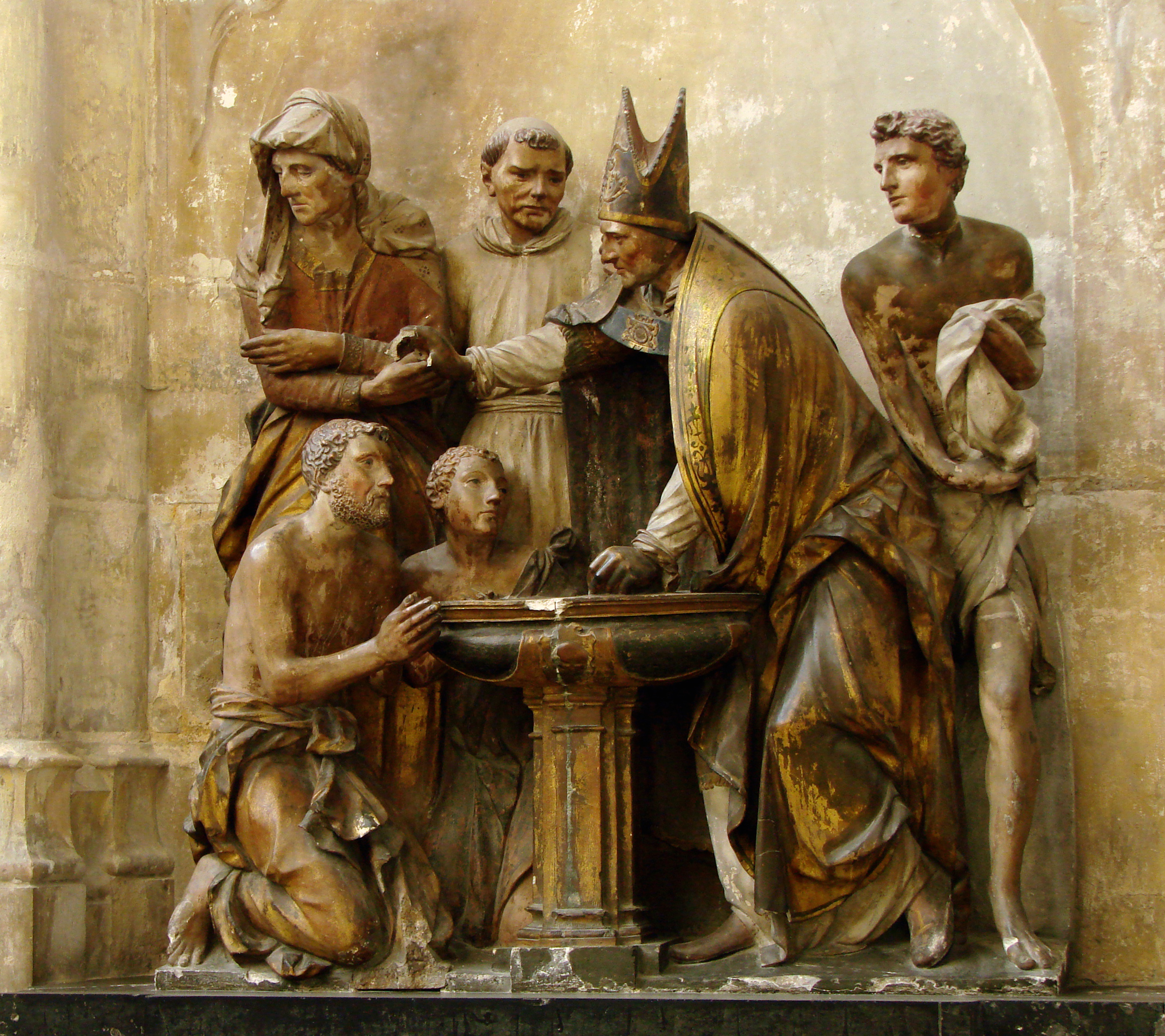
Baptism of Saint Augustine and Saint Ambrose (Baptismal Chapel)

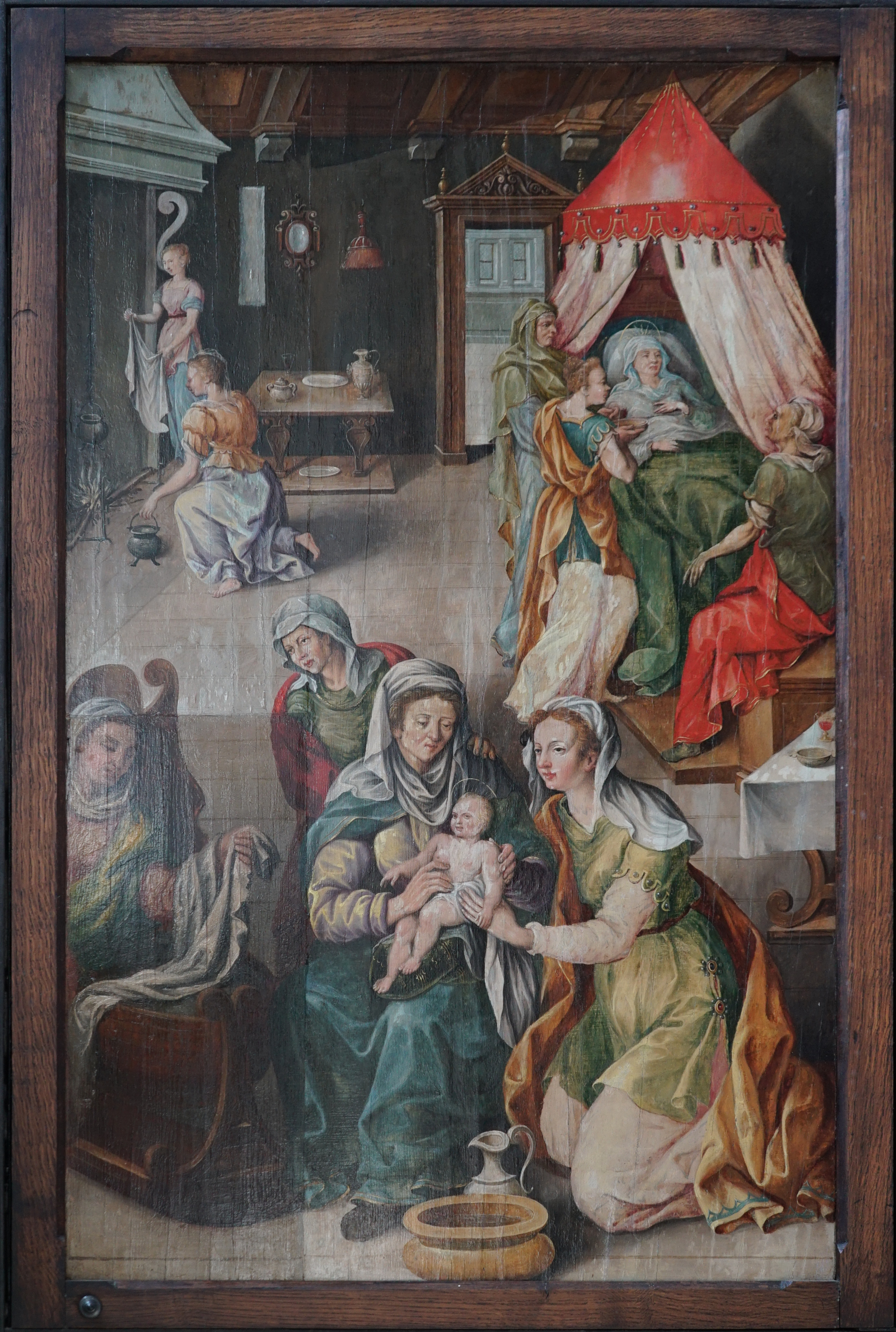
Birth of the Virgin (Chapel of the Holy Sacrament)

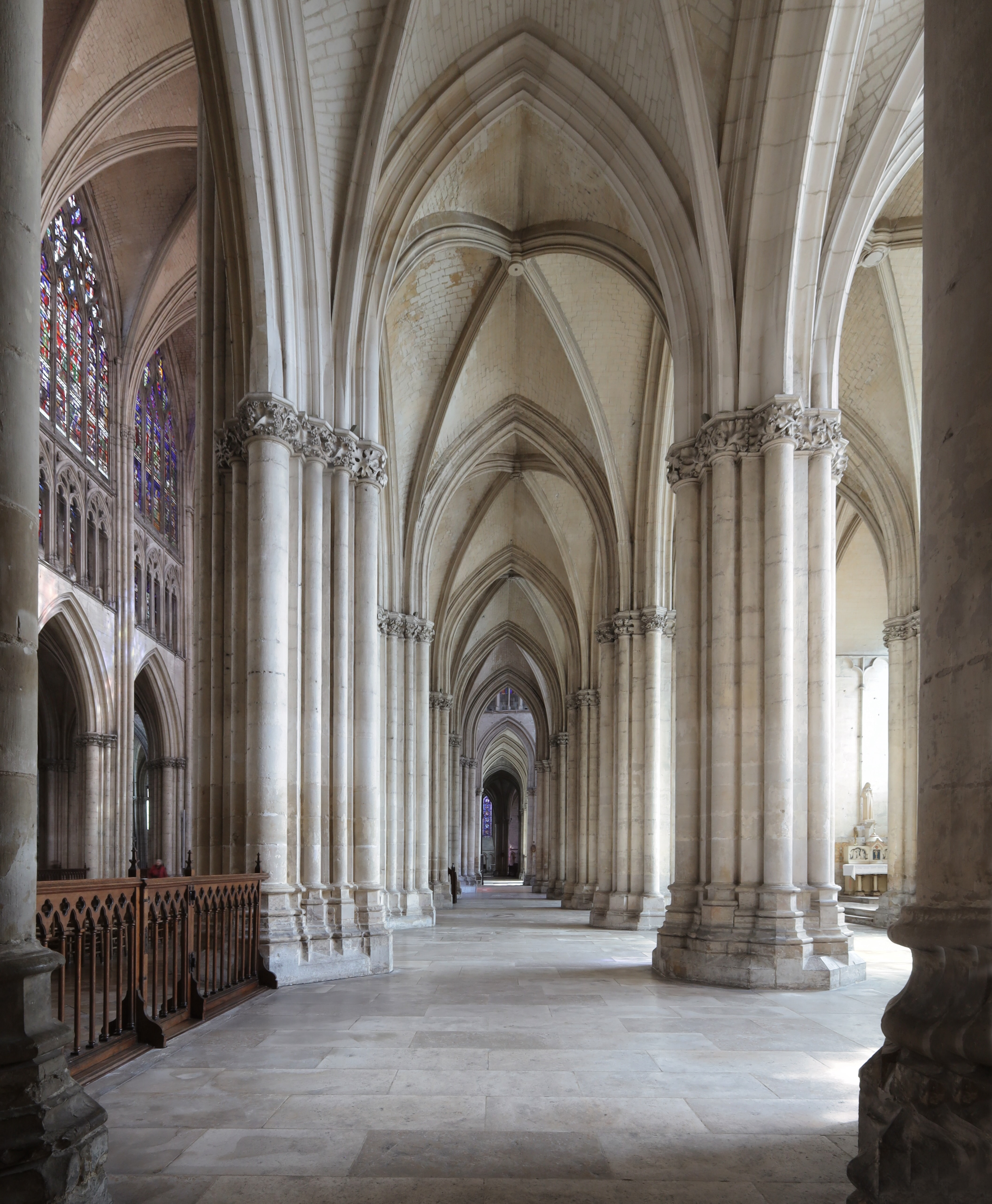
Double aisles

Just inside the west front is a massive rectangular block, which serves as an entrance lobby to the nave and was built solidly to support the towers. Unlike the nave and choir, it has no collateral aisles, and the vaults are more recent lierne vaults from the 16th century, with decorative ribs.

On the east and west sides of the nave and choir are two wide collateral aisles, with vaults lower than those of the central vessel. These give access to a series of chapels that are placed between the buttresses. On the west, there are five small chapels on each side of the nave, each with a large single window, from the late 13th and early 14th centuries.

These chapels contain the largest number of sculptures, mostly from the 14th and especially 16th centuries. One prominent example is the Baptism of Saint Augustine by Saint Ambroise, a lifelike polychrome work with multiple figures in the Baptismal Chapel, on the south side near the west front. This same chapel contains several 16th-century paintings from the school of Troyes, including a 16th-century painting of the Last Supper, inspired by Leonardo da Vinci. This chapel also has the oldest original enclosure, a carved wall dating from 1553 to 1554.

=== Disambulatory and apse chapels ===
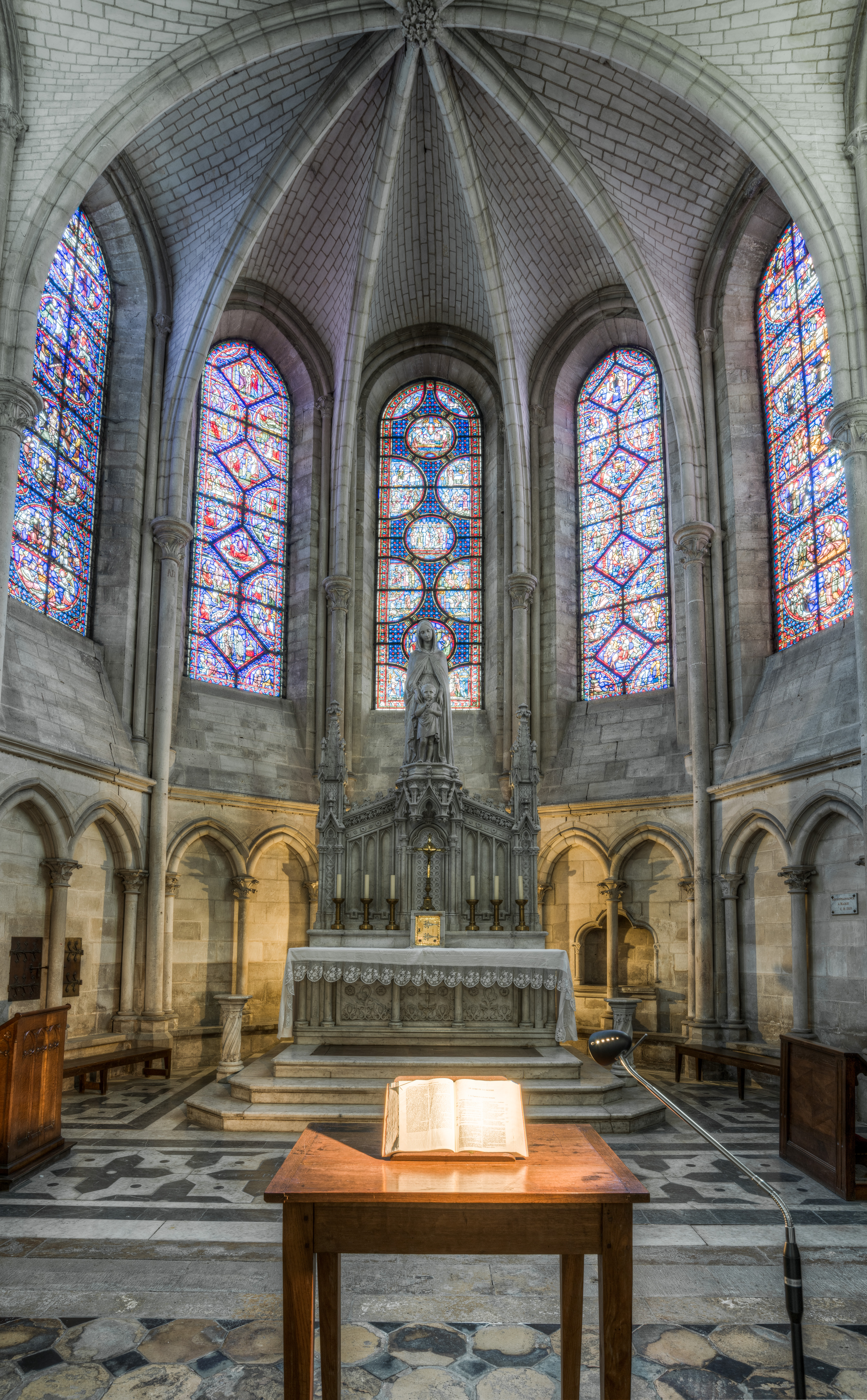
Chapel of the Virgin, with windows dating to 1200–1230. The altar is 19th–century Neo-Gothic.

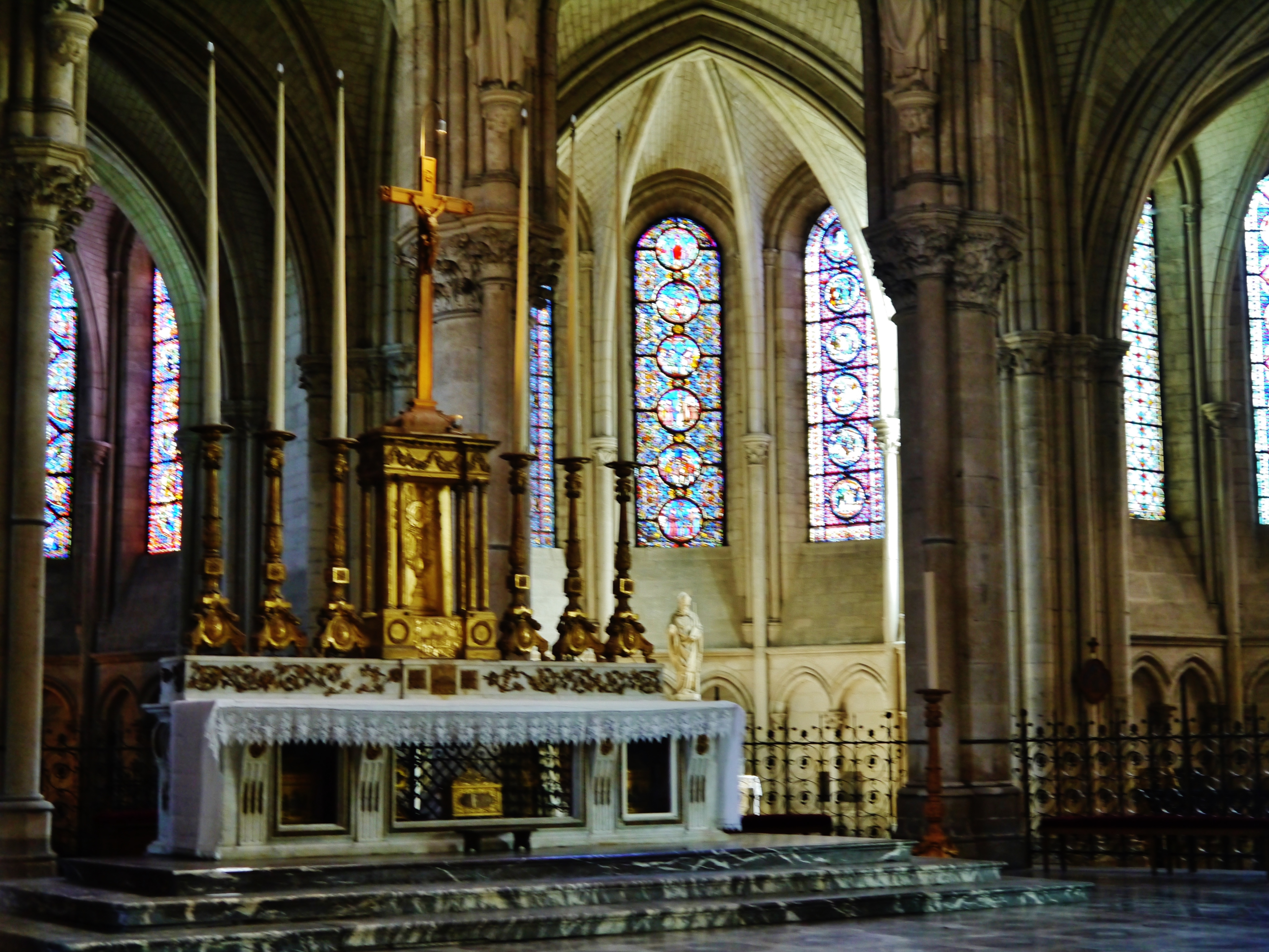
Chapel of Sts. Peter and Paul

The disambulatory of the choir leads to the east end, This passageway contains some of the oldest architecture of the cathedral; the north side of the choir, dating from about 1200, includes a rounded Romanesque arch. The windows are also among the oldest in the cathedral (see Stained Glass section). The ambulatory leads to the six chapels that surround the east end, which have very old windows, but more modern decoration from the 19th century, including Neo-Gothic furnishings made between the 1840s and 1876. The largest is the Chapel of the Virgin, at the very east end. Its windows date to 1200–1230, while its altar is Neo-Gothic from the 19th century.

== Stained glass ==
While the original sculpture at Troyes has largely disappeared, the cathedral still has a large number of its original stained glass windows, installed from the 13th to 16th century, along with some windows incorporating sections of medieval glass, for a total of 1,600 square meters of stained glass. The windows illustrate vividly the evolution of stained glass in France, from the 13th-century windows, with their deeply-colored, thicker pieces of glass assembled like mosaics, to the 15th- and 16th-century windows, using silver stain and enamel painting to create the effects of shading and perspective similar to those of Renaissance painting.

=== The nave ===
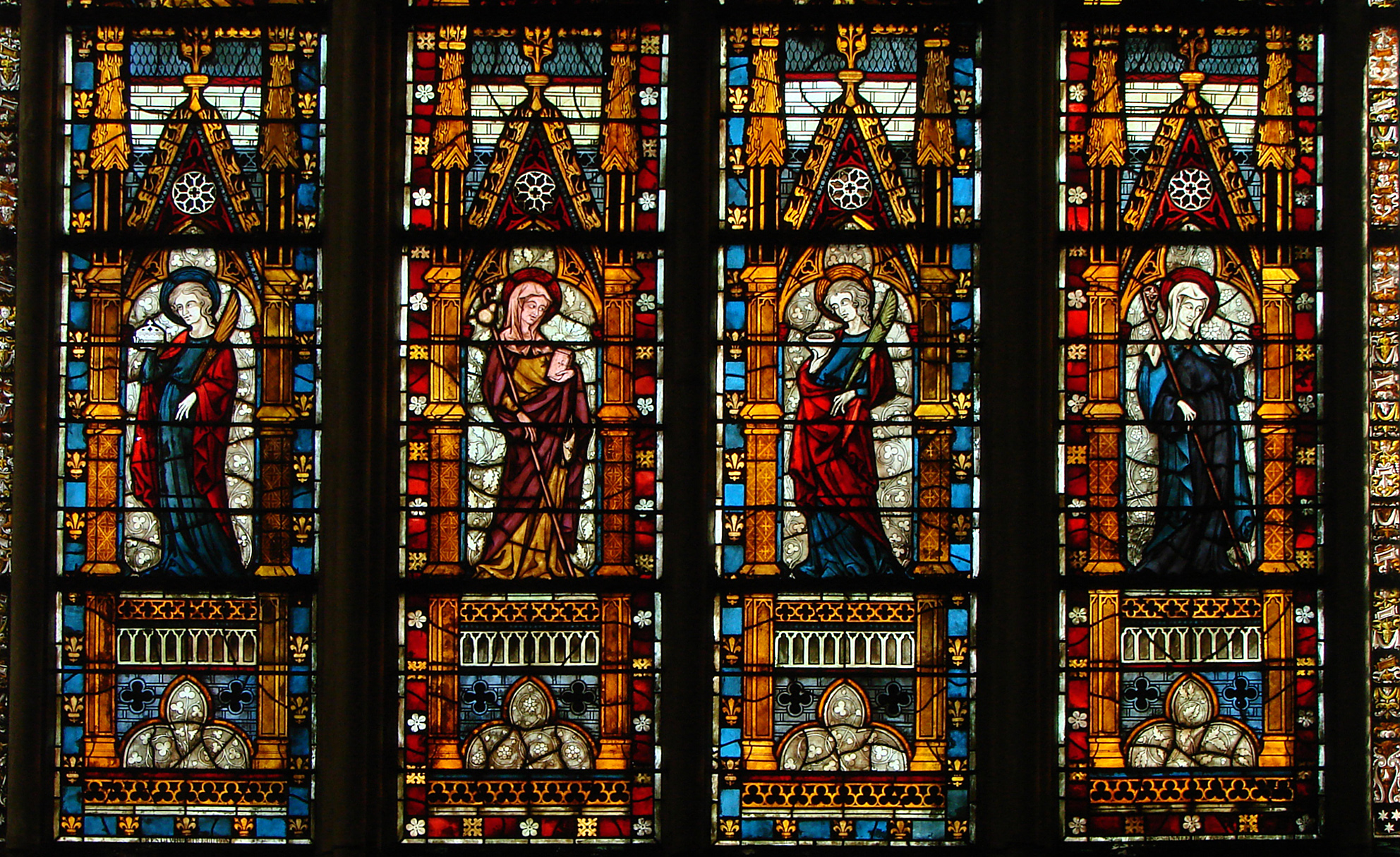
The Apostles - Lower windows of the nave, (south side Bay 51) (14th century)

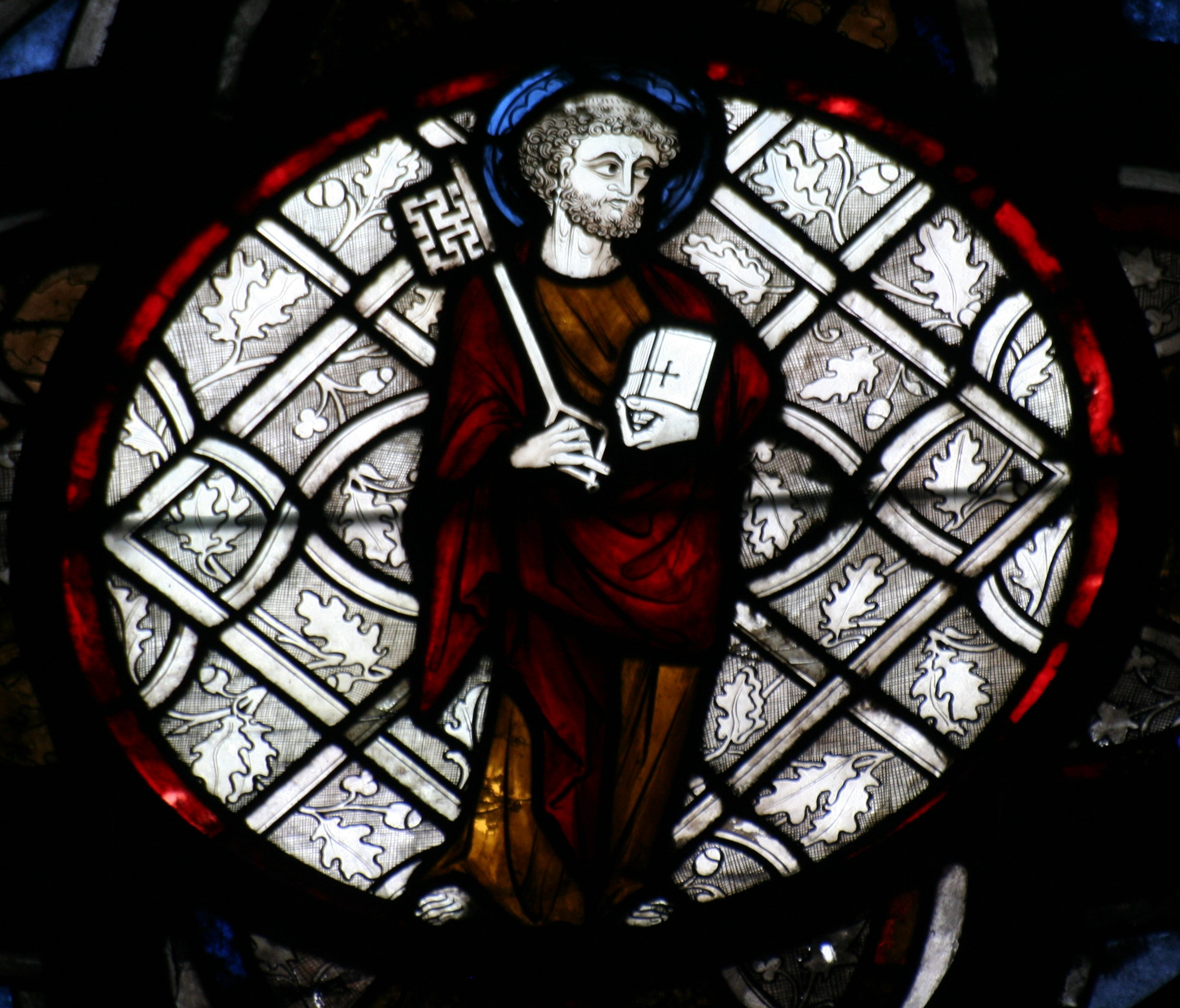
Saint Peter (south side-Bay 47) (14th century)

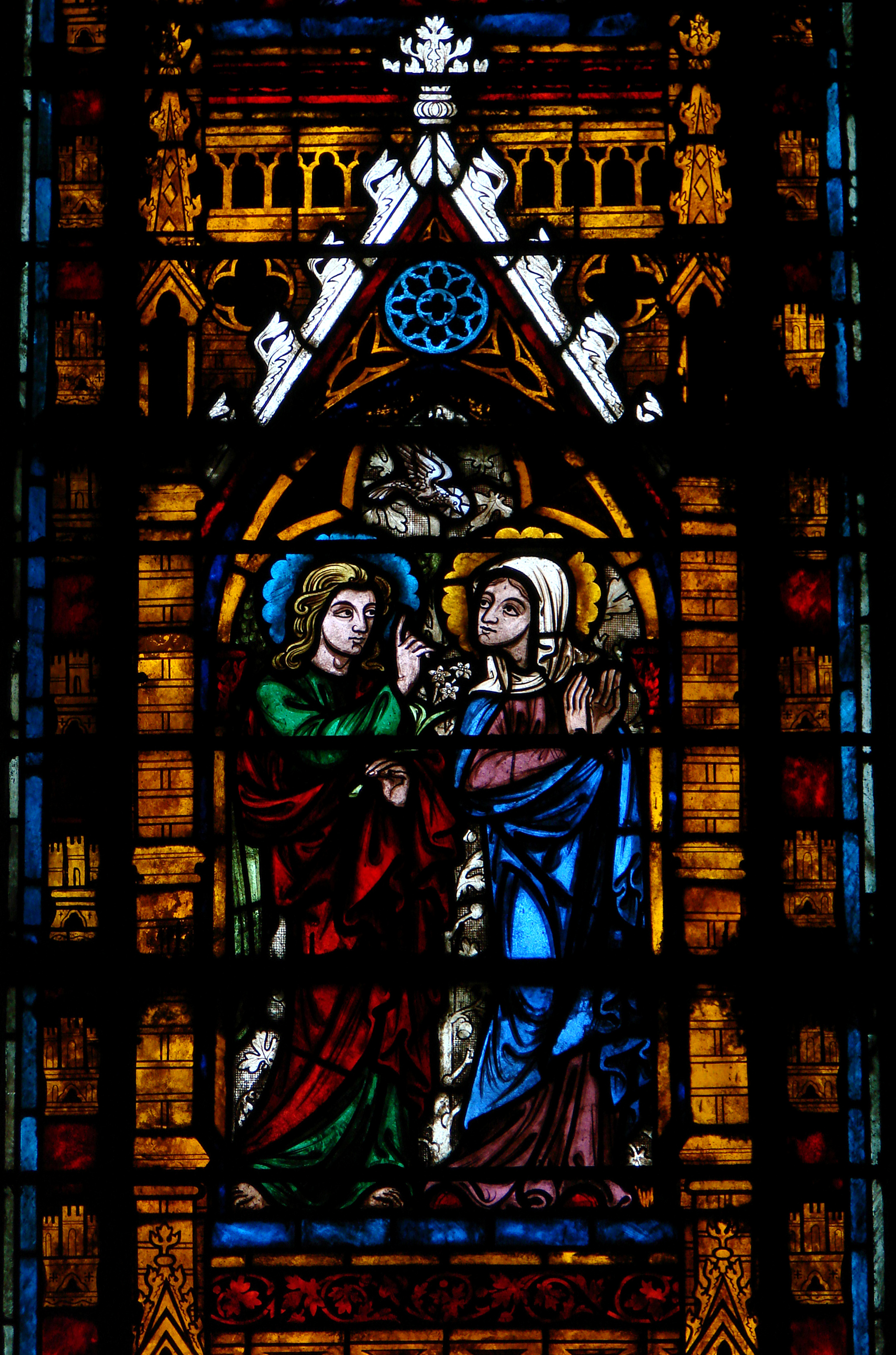
The Annunciation (south side Bay 47) (14th century)

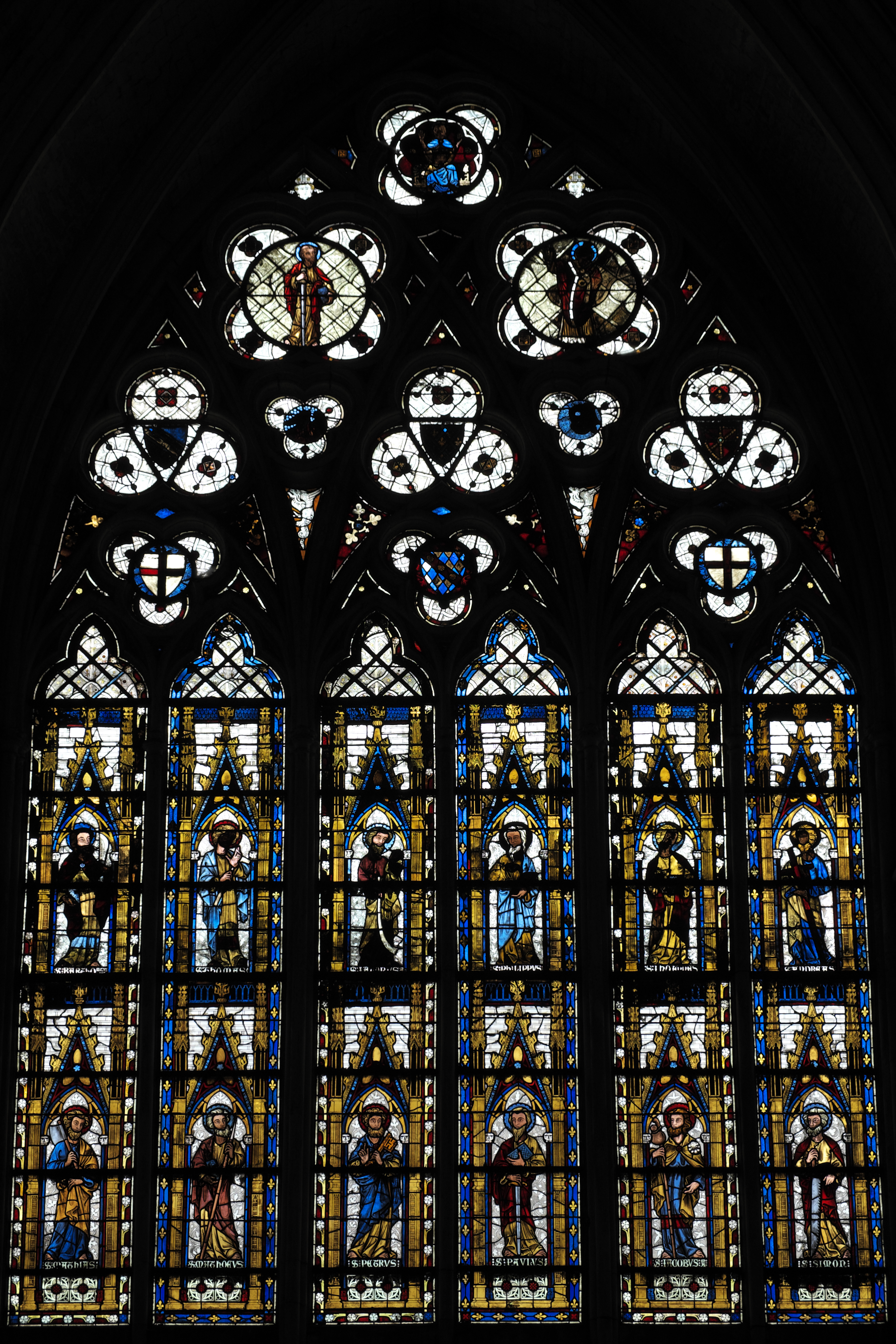
Apostles - Upper windows of nave (Bay 51)

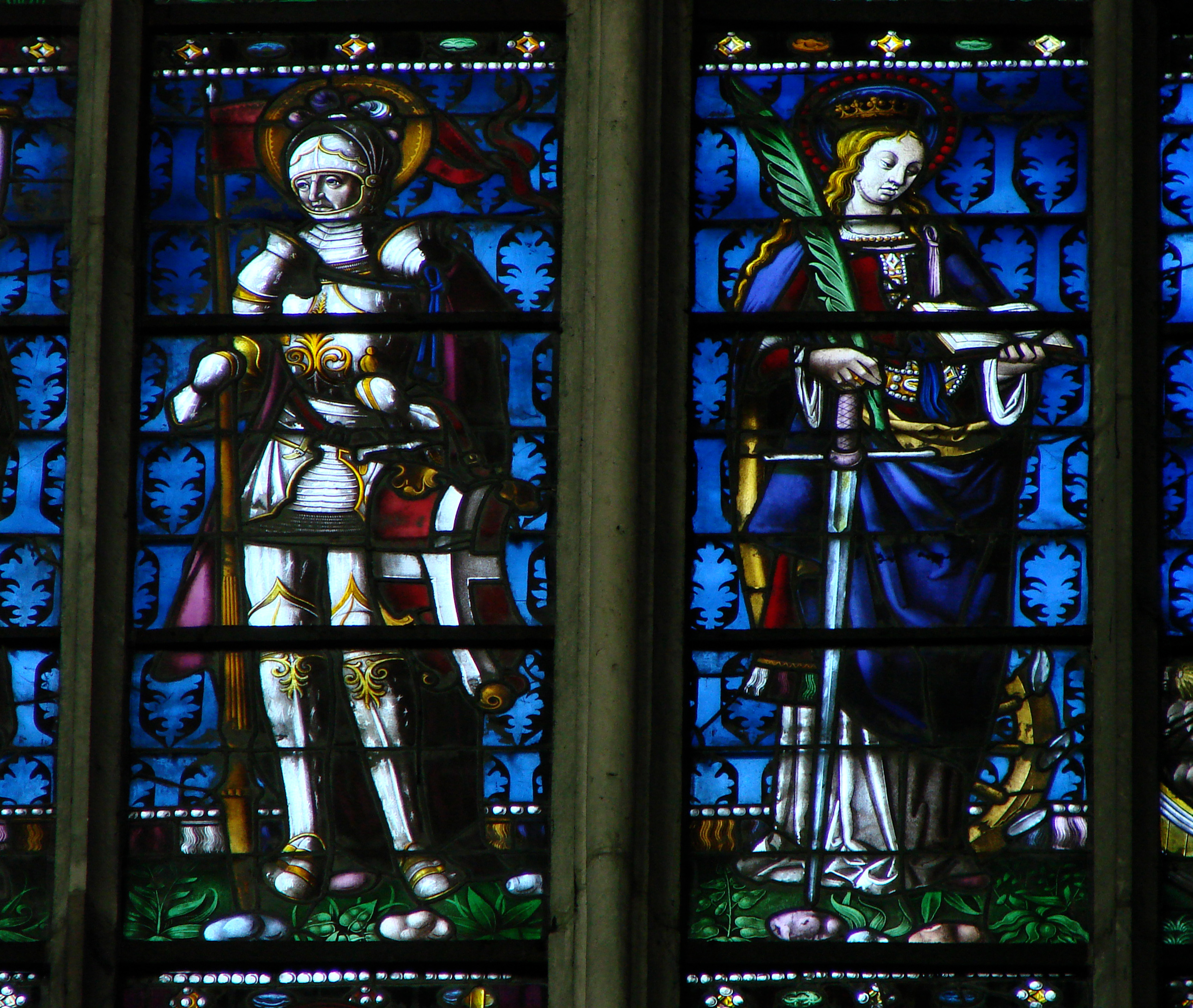
Sainte Catherine of Alexandria and Saint Maurice of Agaune (16th c.)

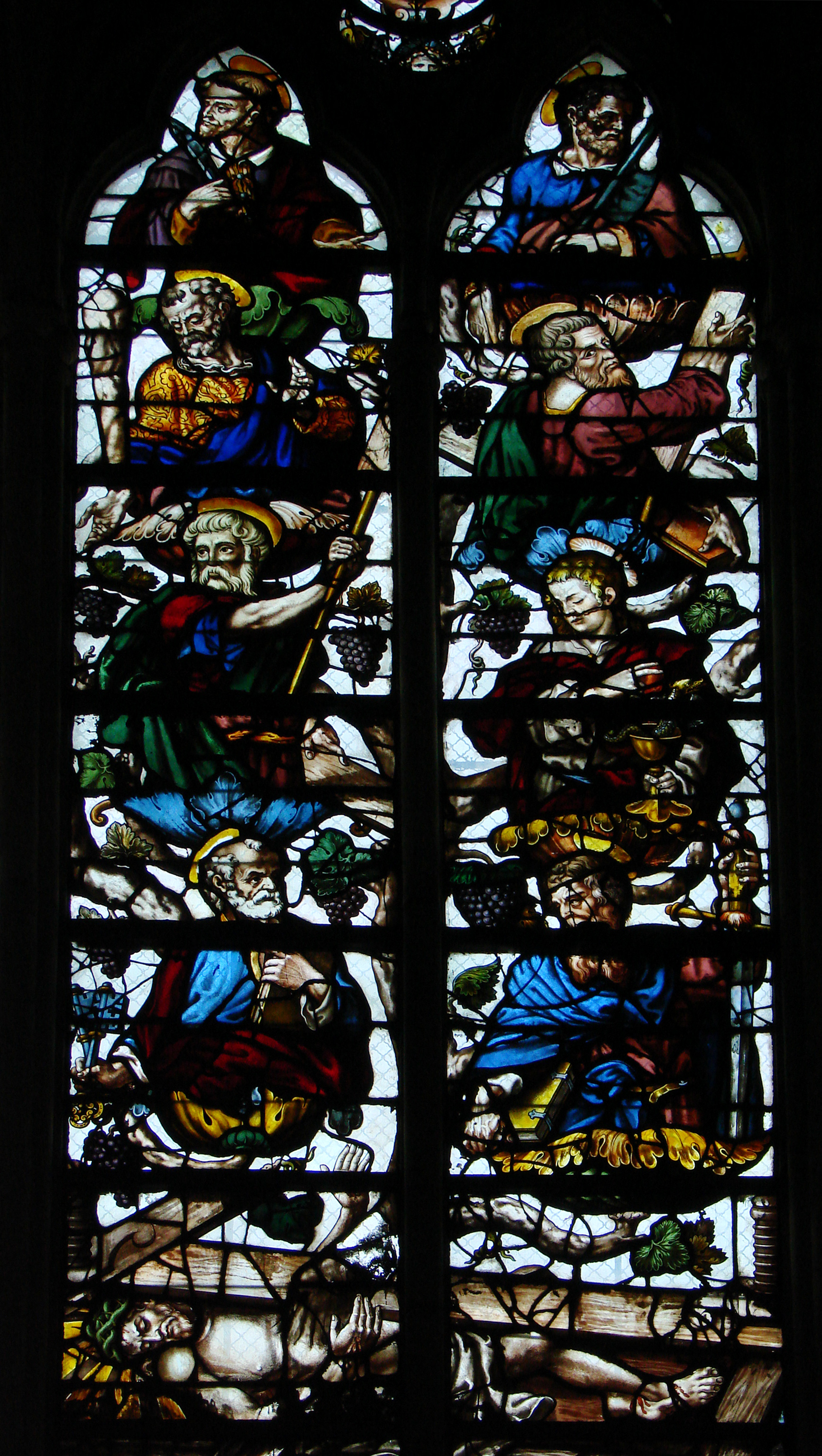
The Mystical Wine Press - Bay 49 (1625)

The nave has glass from a wide variety of periods and styles – sometimes in the same bay. Some of the oldest windows, from the end of the 13th and beginning of the 14th century, are in the lateral chapels. Most of these underwent considerable restoration in the 19th century.

Other bays were given new windows in the 16th and 17th centuries. Of these, some were designed by Linard Gontier, a prominent Troyes artist of the Renaissance. His most famous window in the cathedral is the "Mystical Wine Press", inspired by the prominence of the champagne from the region. It depicts Christ with grapevines sprouting from this chest, and a variety of scenes associating grapes and wine with the apostles.

=== Choir and ambulatory ===
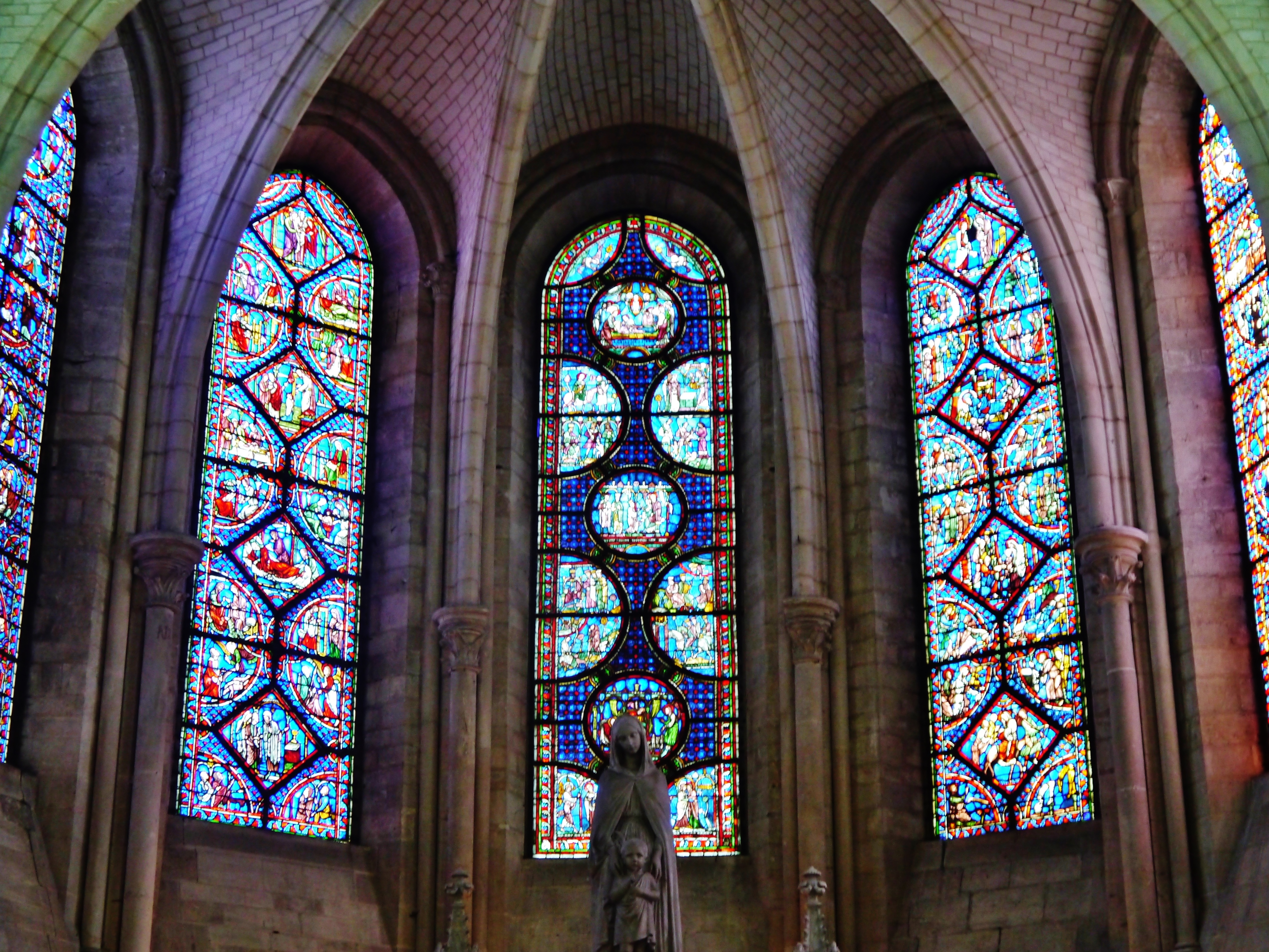
Windows of the axis chapel of the apse, dedicated to the Virgin Mary (13th–19th c.)

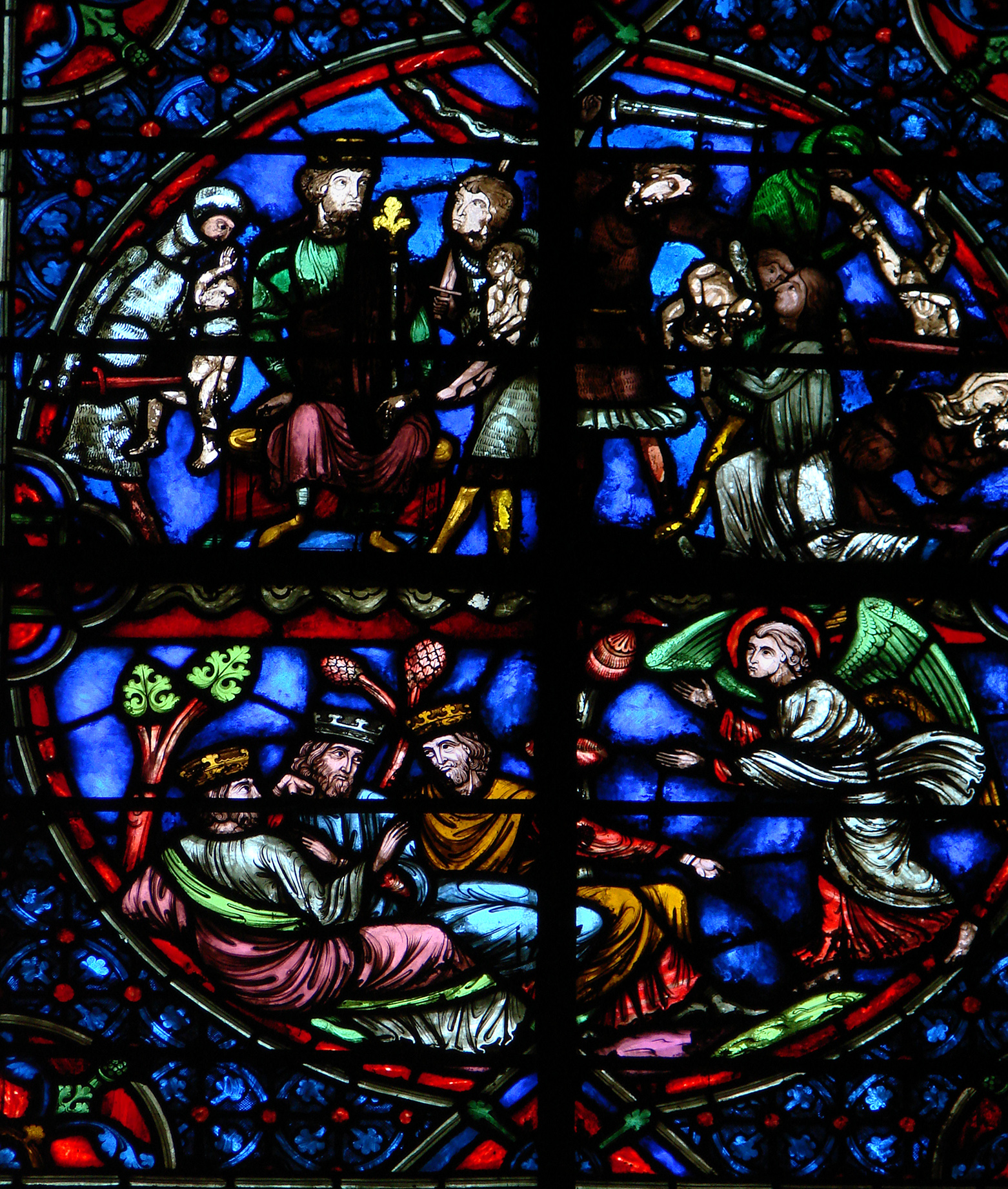
The Flight to Egypt and Adoration of the Magi (13th century)

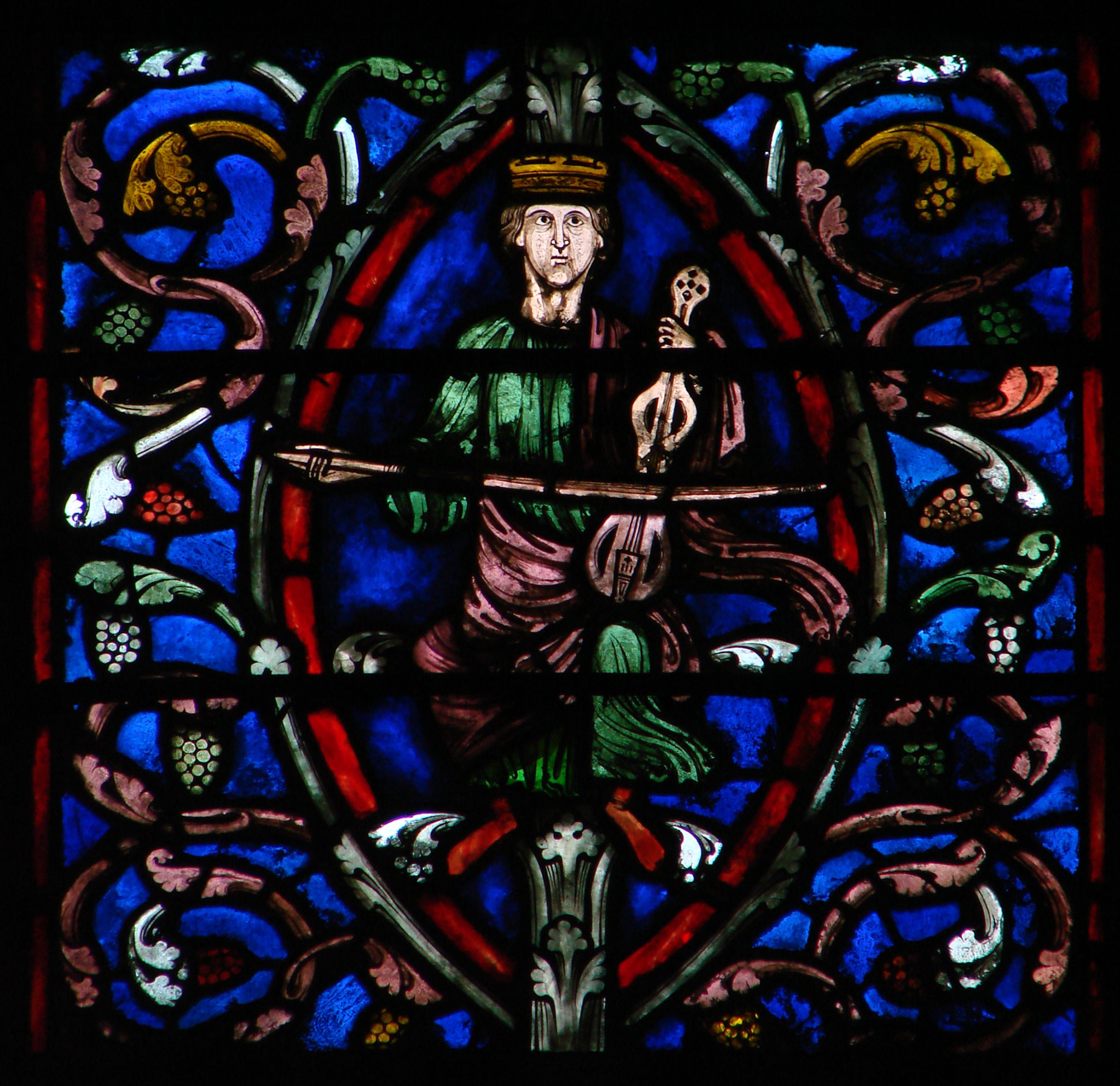
Musician in the Tree of Jesse window, 13th c. Chapel of Joan of Arc, (Bay 31)

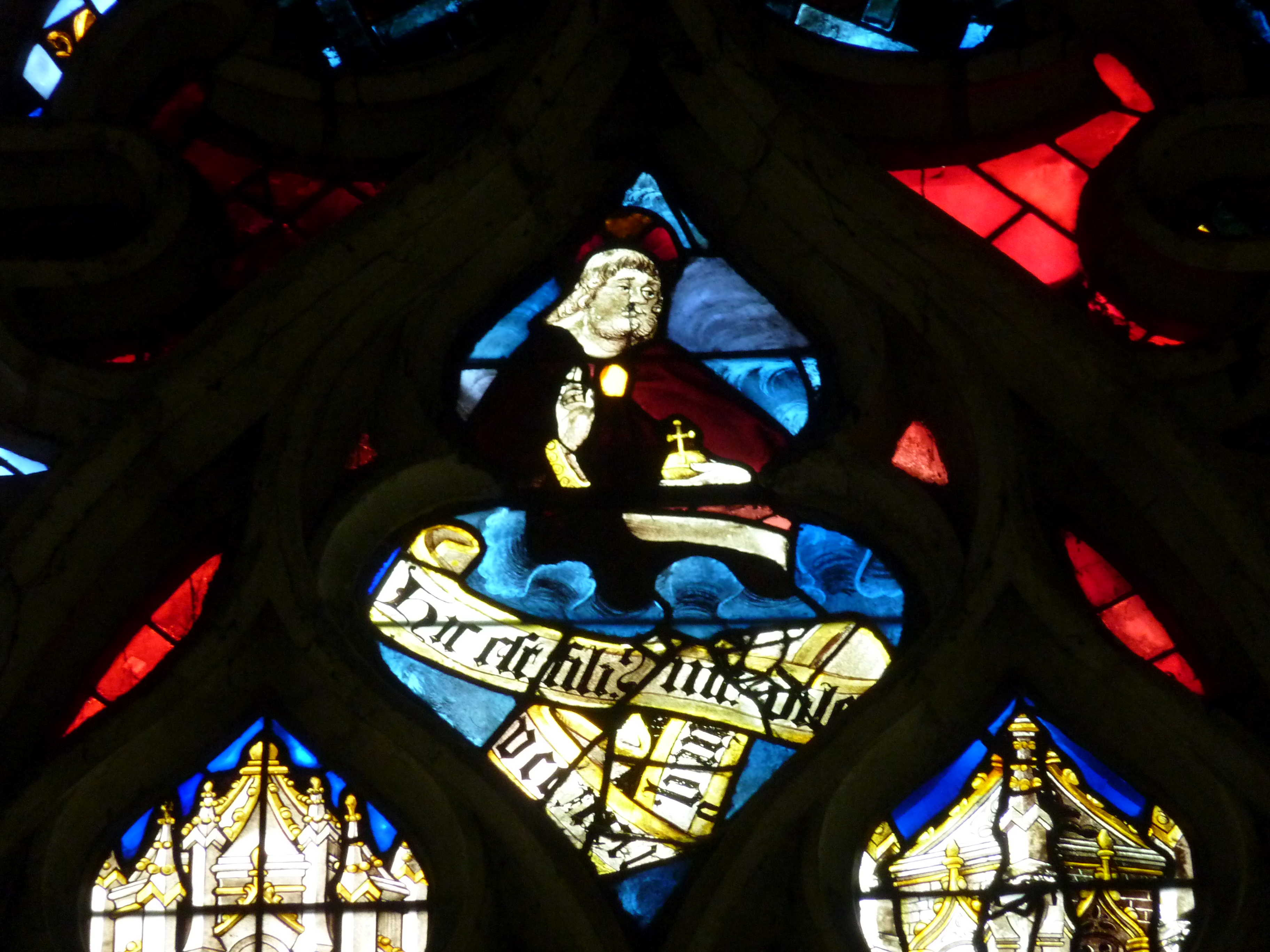
Detail of 15th-century window (Bay 38)

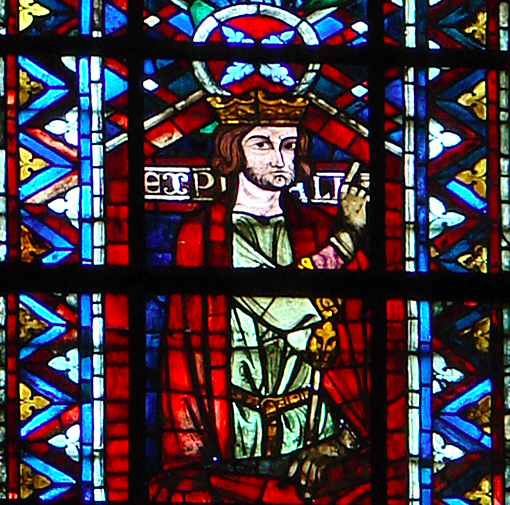
King Philip II of France (Choir, Bay 52)

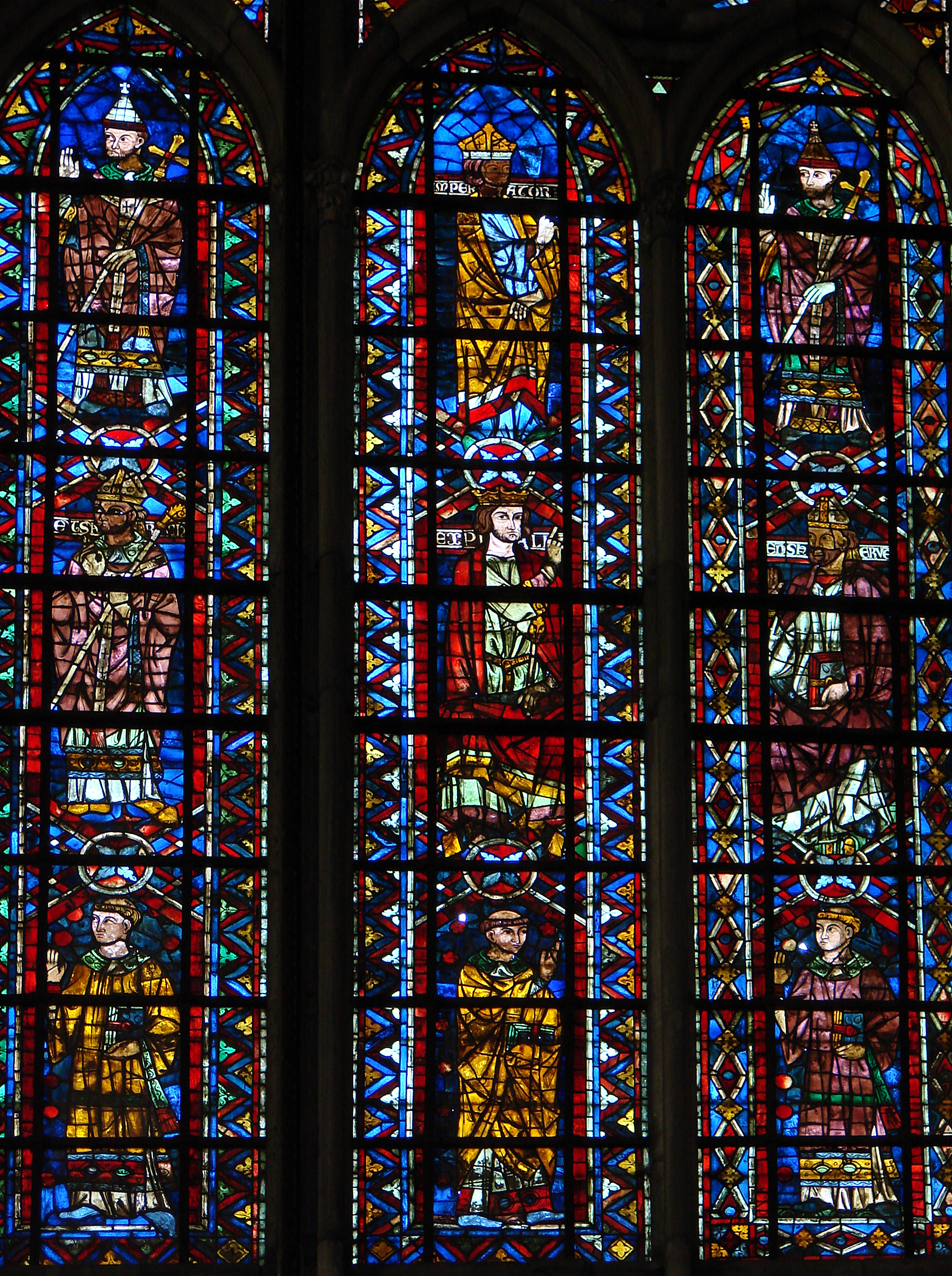
Powers of the Ecclesiastical hierarchy (Bishops and Kings) (Bay 52)

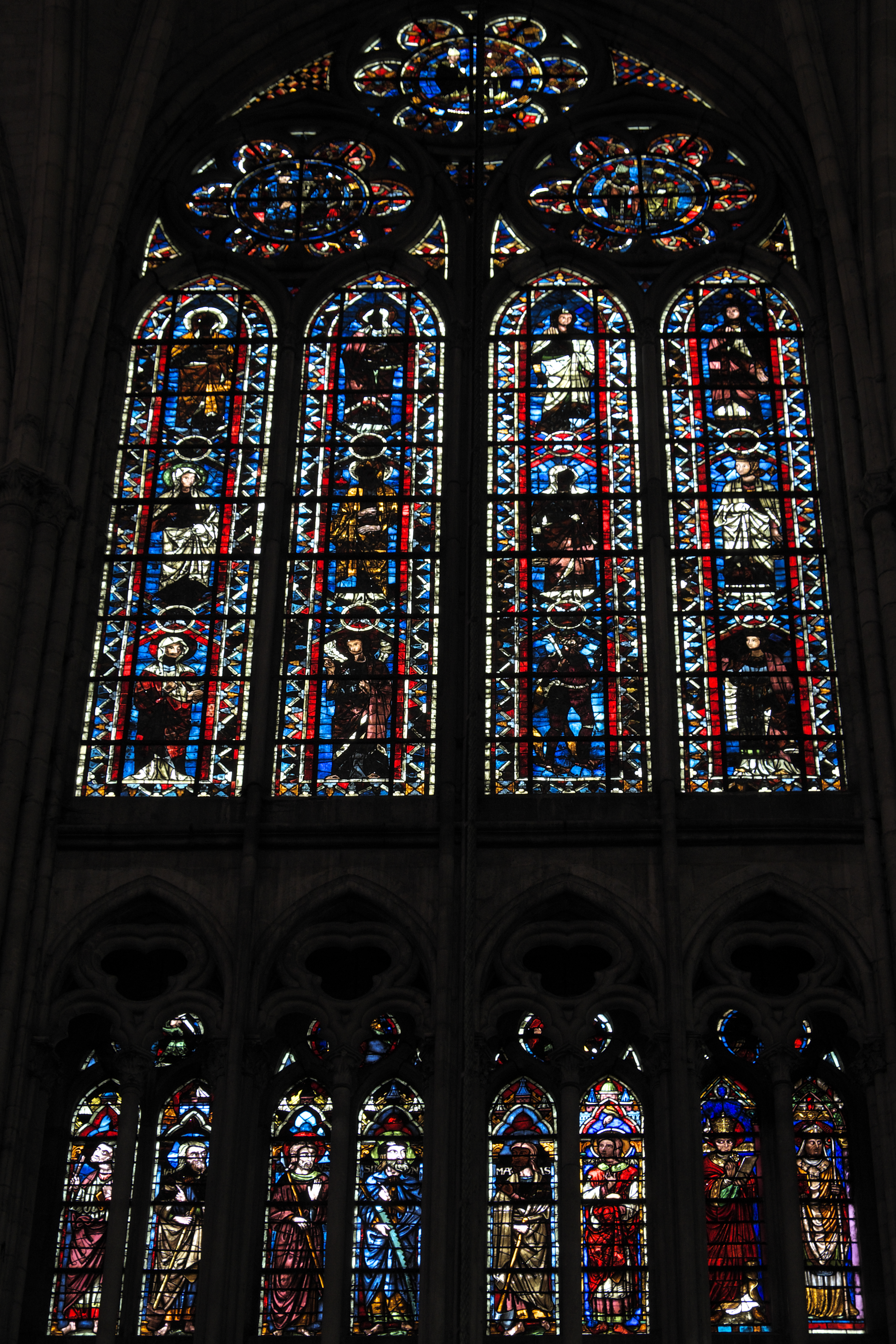
Upper windows of the choir (Bay 208); Parable of the Wise and Foolish Virgins

The choir and the ambulatory, to the east of the cathedral, still have much of their original stained glass. The oldest windows are in the radiating chapels on the east, some dating to 1200–1230. The higher windows and those of the triforium date to about 1235–40. Some of these windows are more recent, but include portions of the older original glass, which had not yet been installed at the time of the hurricane of 1228. While many of the lower windows were considerably modified, the upper windows of the choir are mostly in their original state.

=== Transept ===
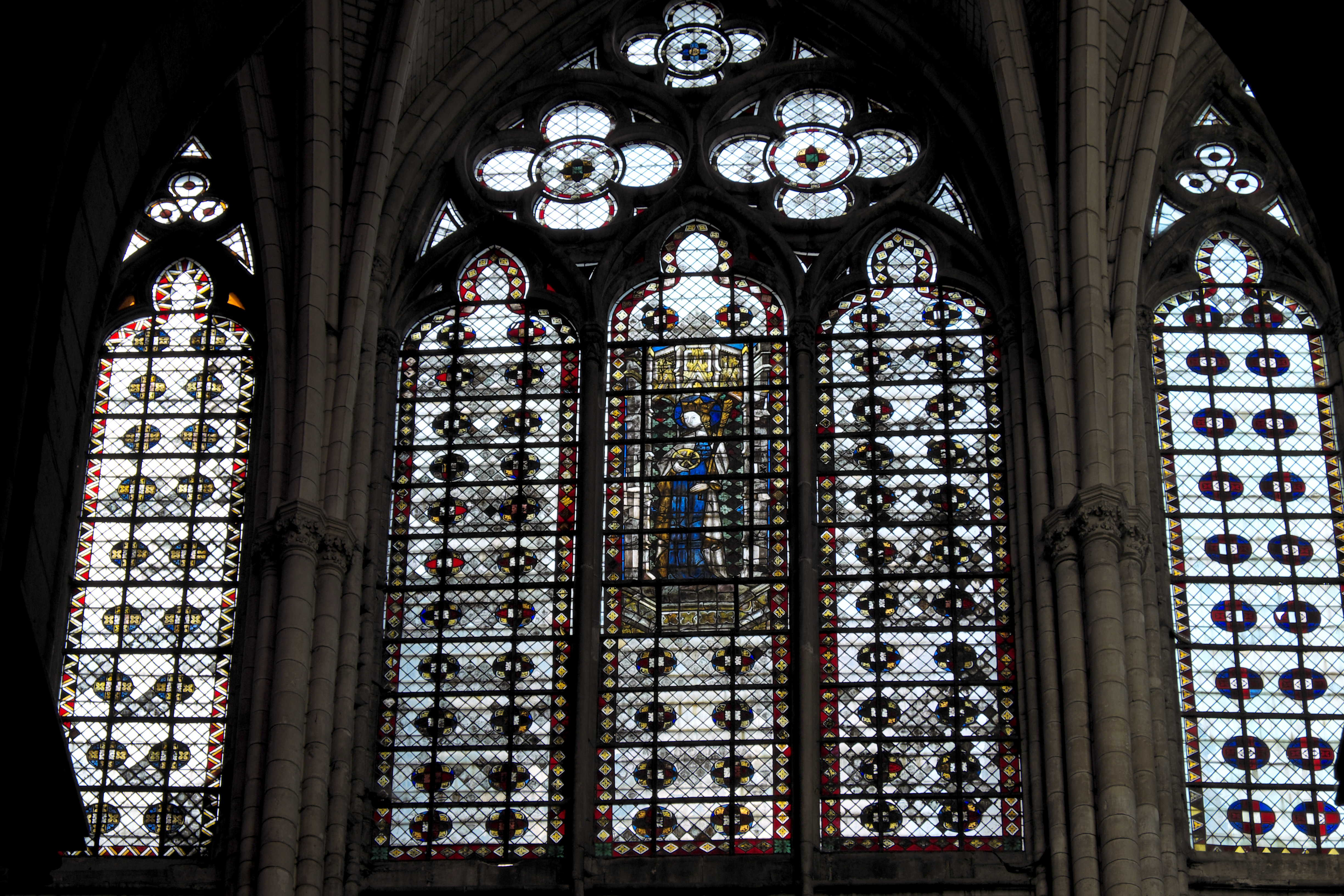
Grisaille windows in the transept

The transept windows have a mixture of styles. The windows on the west are from the 14th century, while those on the east were replaced in the 16th century with windows with tracery of the Flamboyant Gothic style. The triforium windows on the west were made in the 19th century, while the triforium windows on the east include vestiges of restored 13th-century glass.

=== Rose windows ===
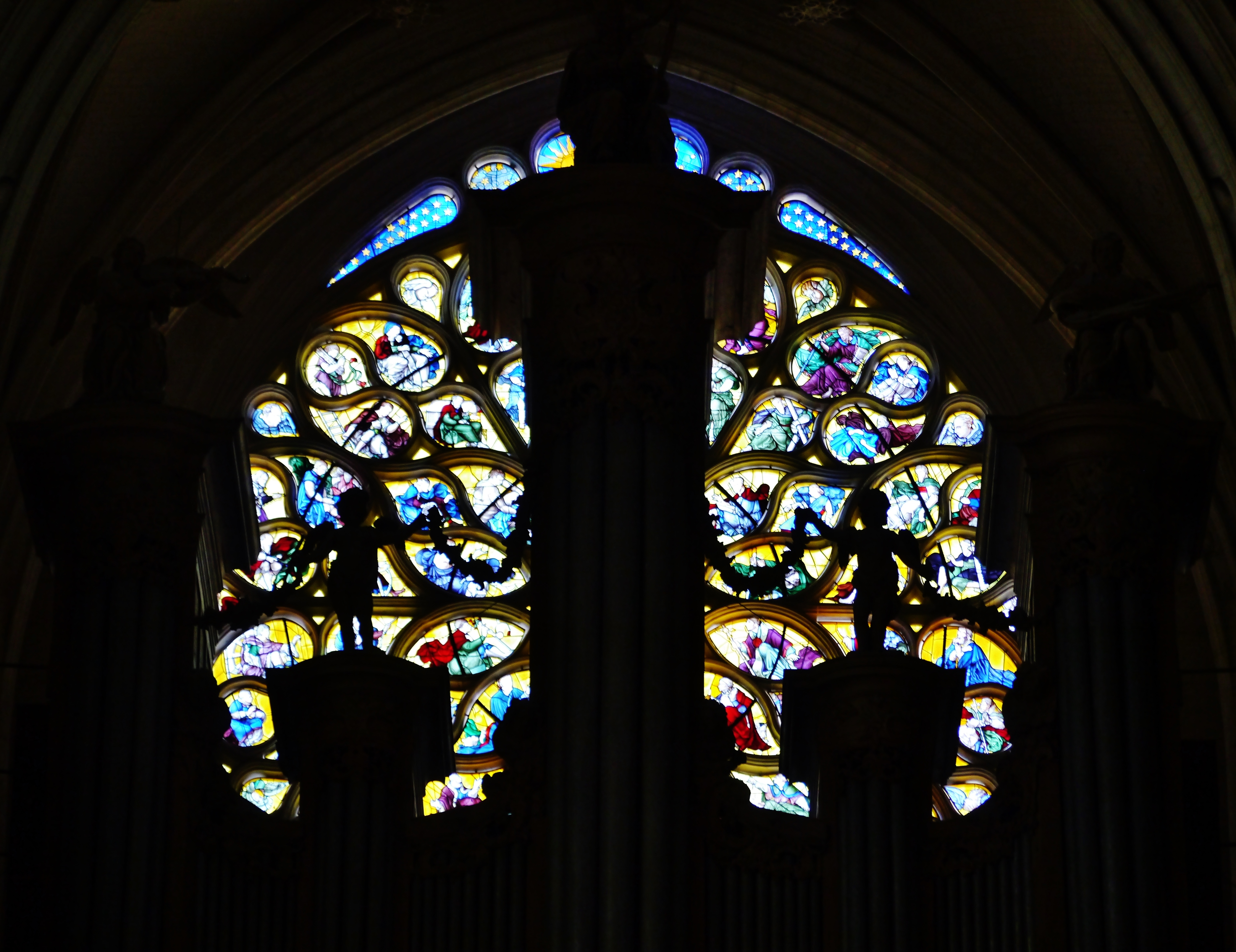
The west rose window (partly hidden by organ)

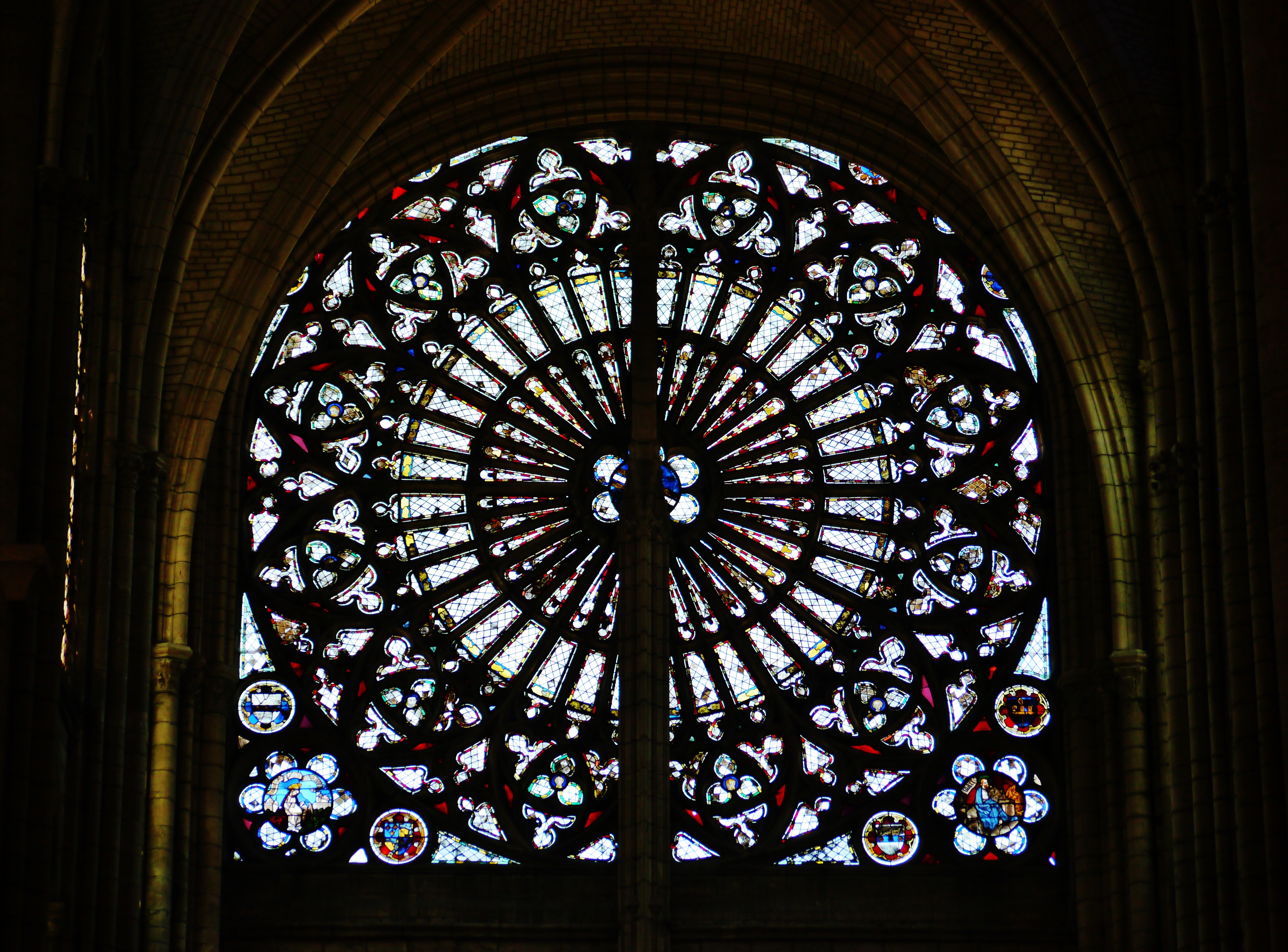
Rose window of the north transept

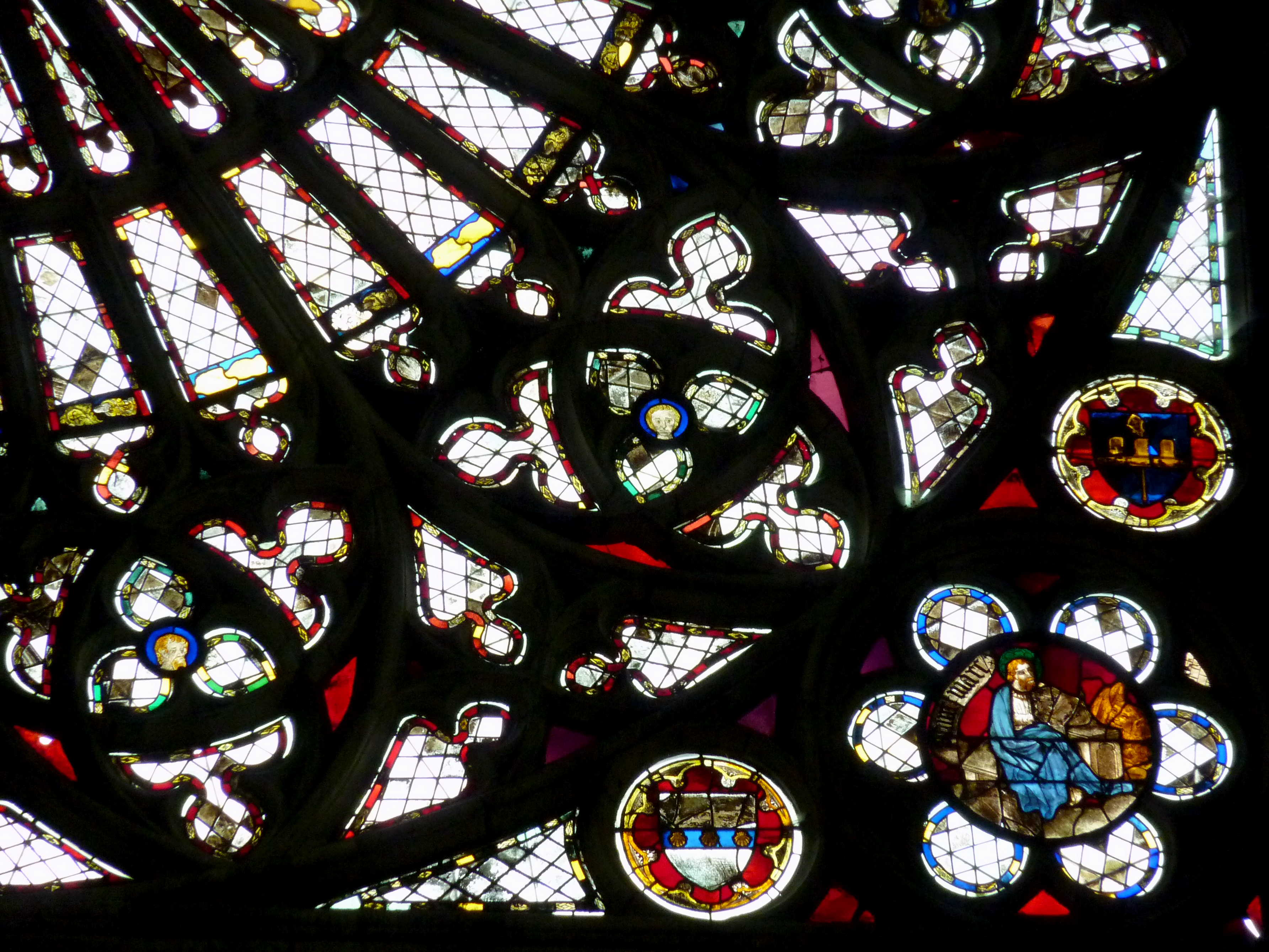
Detail of the north rose window

The rose window at the west end of the nave, from 1239, was made by the artist Jean Soudain on the theme of the celestial court. The view of this window from the ground floor is largely obscured by the organ.

The rose window in the north transept, ten meters in diameter, was installed in the 15th century to replace the earlier window, which fell in 1340. It is in the Rayonnant Gothic style, with its tracery radiating outward from the center. The rose window on the south transept is a copy of the north window.

== Organs ==
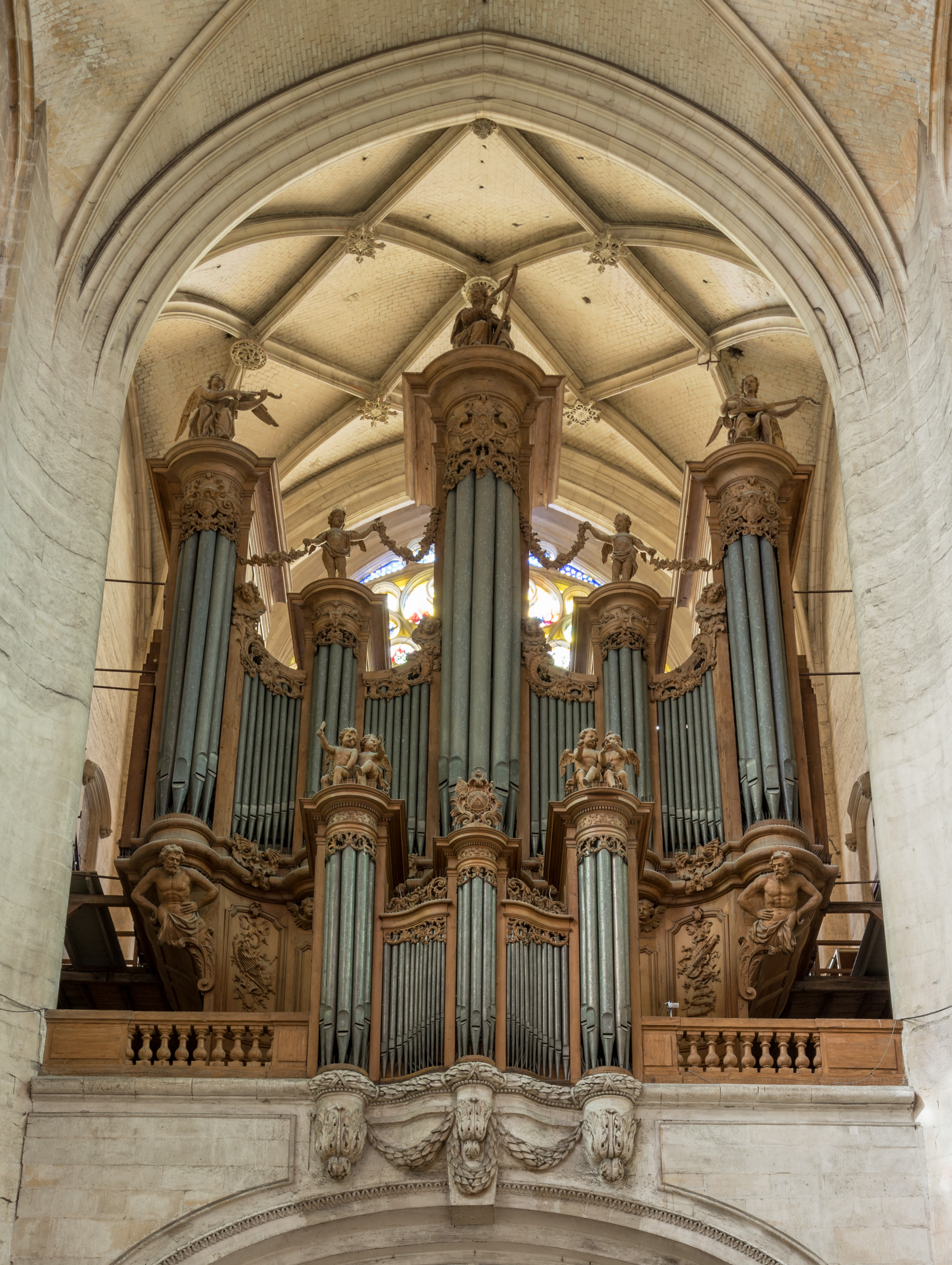
The grand organ, made in 1730 for Clairvaux Abbey

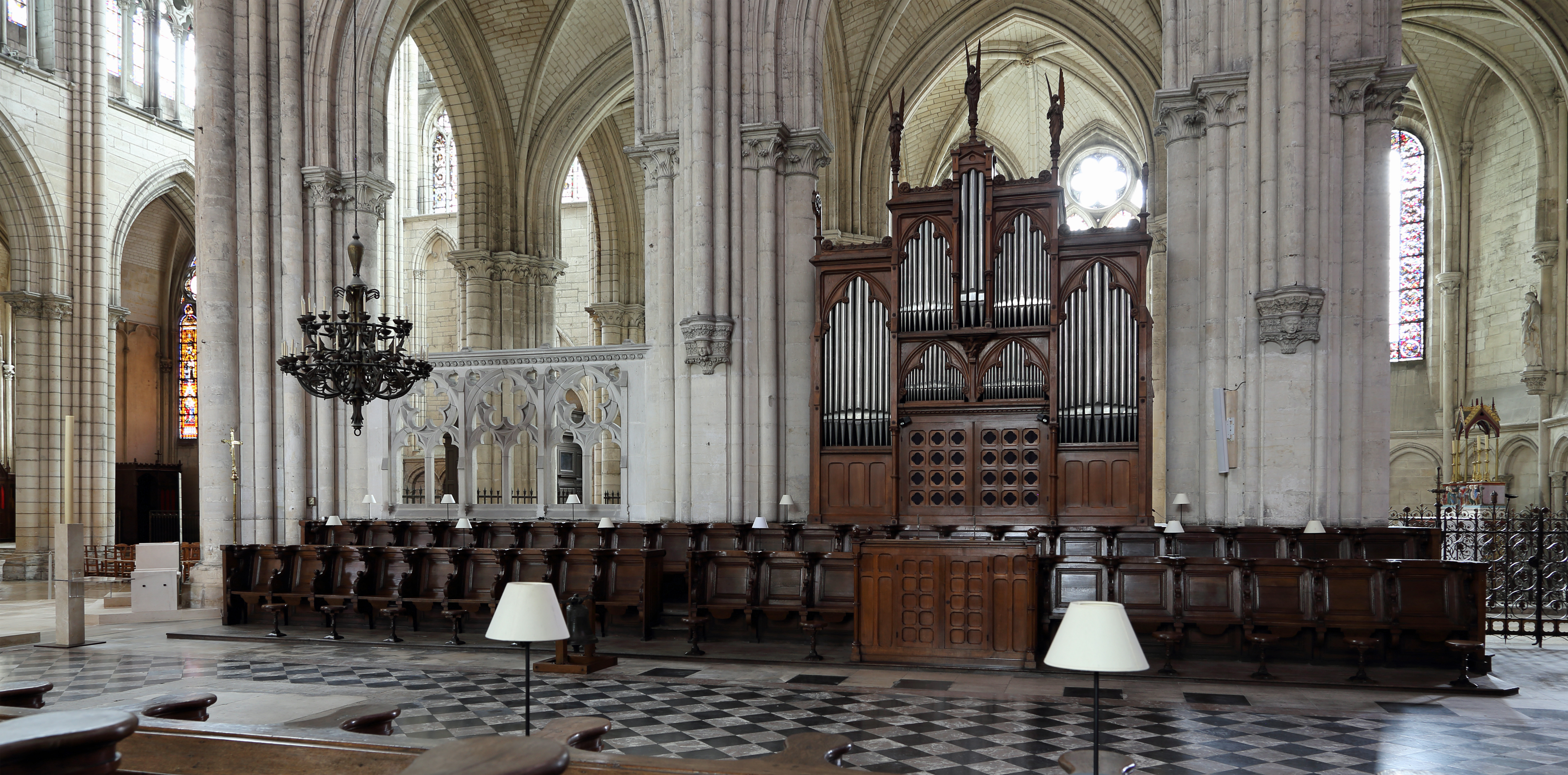
The choir organ

The grand organ is located on a tribune over the portal on the reverse side of the west front. It was originally built in 1730 for Clairvaux Abbey in Burgundy. When the abbey was closed in 1793 during the Revolution, the organ was nationalised and sold at auction. It was purchased by the overseers of Troyes Cathedral, but was not put into place until 1808. It replaced the original Troyes organ, built in the 15th century and placed next to the choir. That organ had been destroyed in 1792. The installation of the new organ was controversial because it largely blocked the view of the west rose window from the nave and choir.

The organ has fifty-five jeux or sounds, played with four keyboards and a set of pedals. The instrument was classified as an historical monument in 1963, and the case in 1974. The organ is decorated with statues of angels and atlantes.

The cathedral has a second, smaller organ, which is located in the choir. This instrument was built in 1865 and was restored in 1987. It has thirteen jeux, played with two keyboards and a set of pedals.

== Bells ==
Troyes Cathedral has four bourdons, heavy bells which made a deep note, for tolling on solemn occasions. Each has a name, and all were made in the early 19th century, replacing the early bells taken out and melted down during the French Revolution.

- Petrus Carolus - (4500 kilos, made in 1827)
- Paulus Ana - (3,269 kilos, made in 1813)
- Savinianus - (2,437 kilos, made in 1813)
- Marie - (2000 kilos, made in 1827)

== Treasury ==
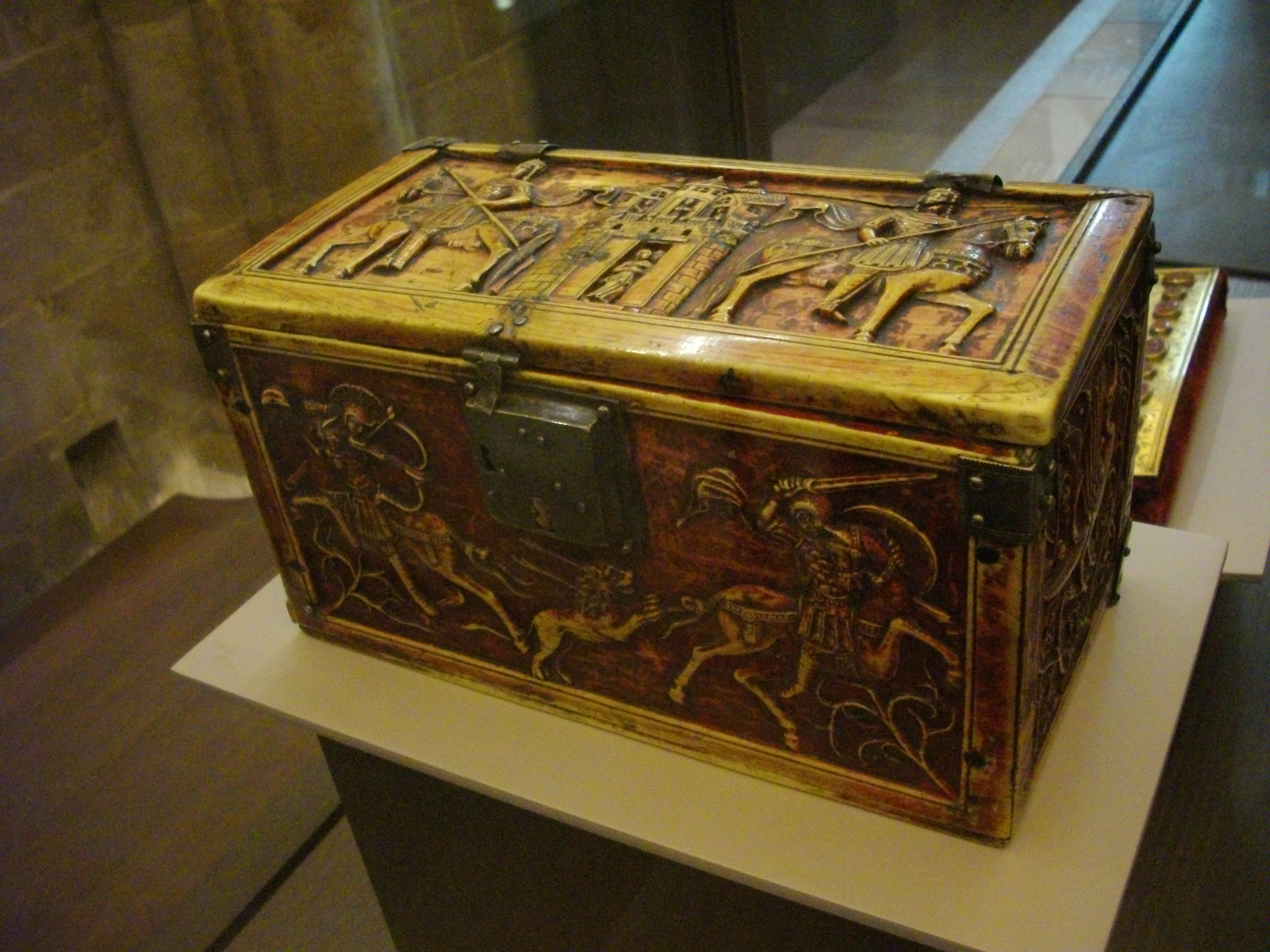
The Coffret of Troyes (Ivory, 11th century)

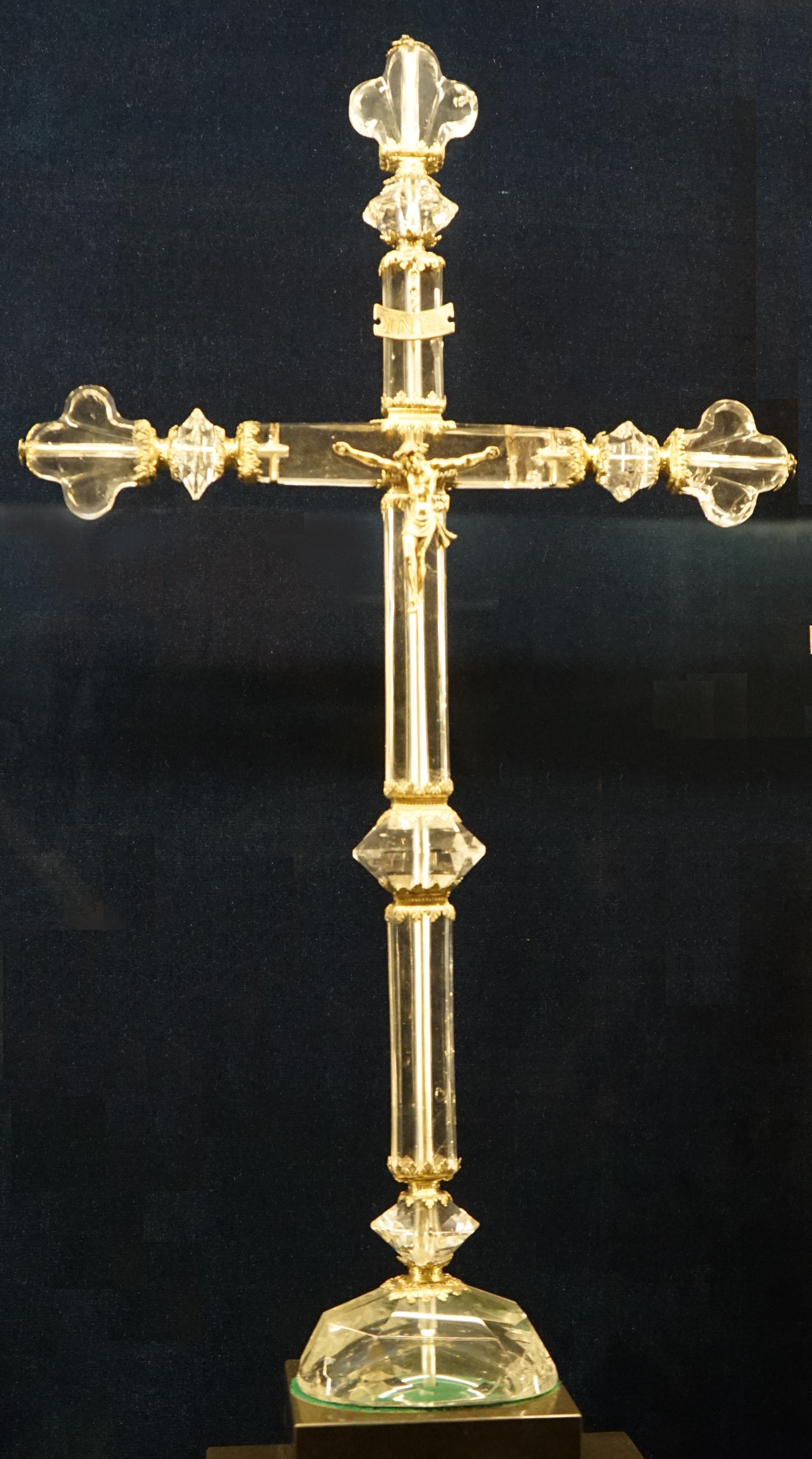
The Stuart Cross, made of crystal

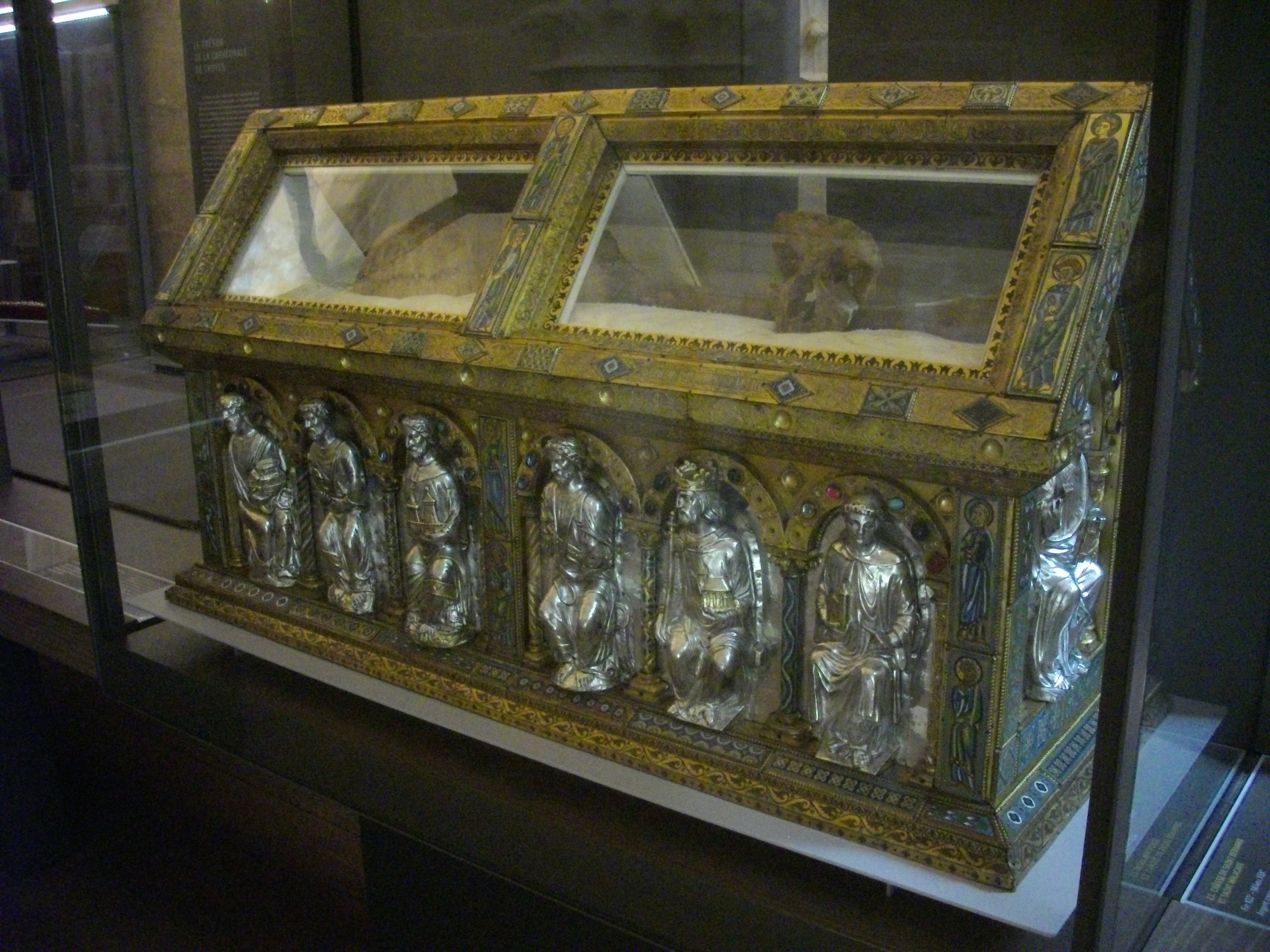
Reliquary of Saint Bernard of Clairvaux, with silver, copper and enamel (12th century)

The treasury of the cathedral was constructed at the beginning of the 13th century within the choir, next to the apse. It was particularly designed to display the collection of sacred relics which the Bishop Garnier de Traînel had brought back to France from the Fourth Crusade. Some of the relics and other valuable objects were used as ransom for the captive King Francois I in 1525, and others were lost during the Revolution, but the collection was gradually rebuilt. It has a particularly large collection of medieval enamel art, made by local craftsmen in the 12th century, as well as vestments, reliquaries and other medieval liturgical objects. Notable objects include the coffret of Troyes, an ivory chest of Byzantine craftsmanship from the 11th century.

== Possible Indian connection ==
Among the stained-glass windows is one which appears to have a representation of the famous Indo-Parthian king Gondophares who was ruling in ancient Taxila from 20 to 41 CE, in what is now north-western Pakistan.

According to the legends and traditions contained in the Acts of Thomas, and preserved by the Indian Christians of St. Thomas, the Apostle Thomas fled to the East after the crucifixion. He stayed for some time at Gondophares' court where Thomas is said to have built a palace for him before heading on to southern India where he was, according to the legend, martyred near modern Chennai (Madras)

== Sources ==
- Balcon-Berry, Sylvie (2016). Cathédrale Saint-Pierre-et-Saint-Paul -Troyes (in French). Éditions du Patrimoine, Centre des Monuments Nationaux. ISBN 978-2-7577-0449-3.
- Balcon, Sylvie, and Philippot, Jacques, 2001. La cathédrale Saint-Pierre-et-Saint-Paul de Troyes. Paris: Centre des monuments nationaux, Monum (Éditions du Patrimoine). ISBN 2-85822-615-6 ISBN 978-2-85822-615-3
- Brisac, Catherine (1994). Le Vitrail (in French). Paris: La Martinière. ISBN 2-73-242117-0.

== See also ==
- Gothic cathedrals and churches
- French Gothic architecture
- French Gothic stained glass windows
- List of Gothic Cathedrals in Europe
