= 1615 in France =

- Decades: 1590s; 1600s; 1610s; 1620s; 1630s
- See also: History of France; Timeline of French history; List of years in France

Events from the year 1615 in France.

== Incumbents ==
- Monarch – Louis XIII

== Events ==
- 24 November – Louis XIII marries Anne of Austria
- Unknown
  - The Company of the Moluccas is established to trade in the East Indies
  - Construction work commences on the Luxembourg Palace designed by Salomon de Brosse
  - The Merian map of Paris is created
  - Production of carpets at the Savonnerie manufactory is begun by Pierre DuPont

== Births ==
- 27 January – Nicolas Fouquet, Superintendent of Finances (died 1680)

== Deaths ==
- 27 March – Margaret of Valois, dowager queen of France (born 1553)
