= 1616 in France =

- Decades: 1590s; 1600s; 1610s; 1620s; 1630s
- See also: History of France; Timeline of French history; List of years in France

Events from the year 1616 in France.

== Incumbents ==
- Monarch – Louis XIII

== Events ==
- 3 May – Treaty of Loudun

== Births ==
=== Full date missing ===
- Sébastien Bourdon, painter and engraver (died 1671)
- Anne Gonzaga, noblewoman and salonist (died 1684)
- Henri Testelin, painter (died 1695)

== Deaths ==
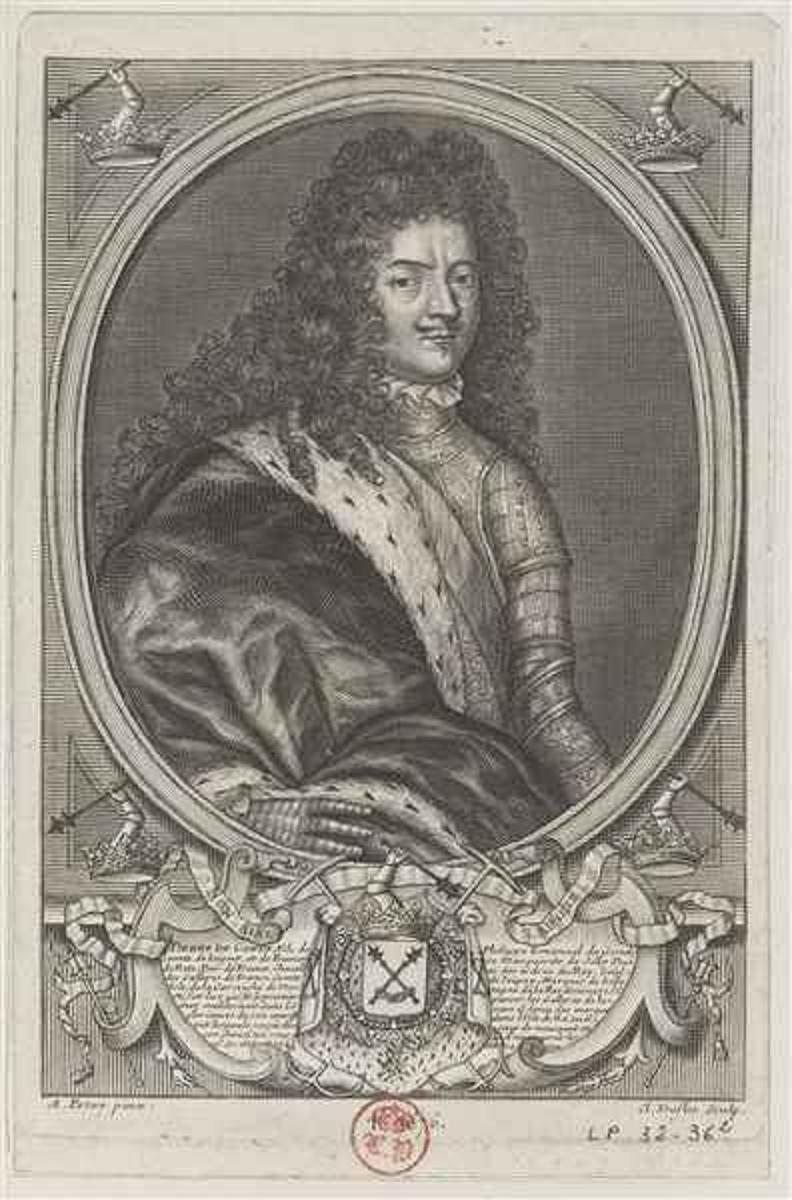
Pierre de Gondi

=== Full date missing ===
- Pierre de Gondi, bishop and cardinal (born 1533)
- Nicholas Rémy, magistrate, hunter (born 1530)
- Pierre-Olivier Malherbe, explorer (born 1569)
- Florence Rivault, mathematician (born 1571)
- Sylvestre de Laval, Roman Catholic theologian (born 1570)
