= 1605 in France =

- Decades: 1580s; 1590s; 1600s; 1610s; 1620s
- See also: History of France; Timeline of French history; List of years in France

Events from the year 1605 in France.

== Incumbents ==
- Monarch – Henry IV

== Events ==
In North America, the French abandoned their settlement on the St. Croix River (Nova Scotia) after a disastrous winter.

== Births ==
- 28 September – Ismaël Bullialdus, astronomer and mathematician (died 1694)

=== Full date missing ===
- Pierre Patel, painter (died 1676)
- Jean de Montpezat de Carbon, bishop (died 1685)

== Deaths ==
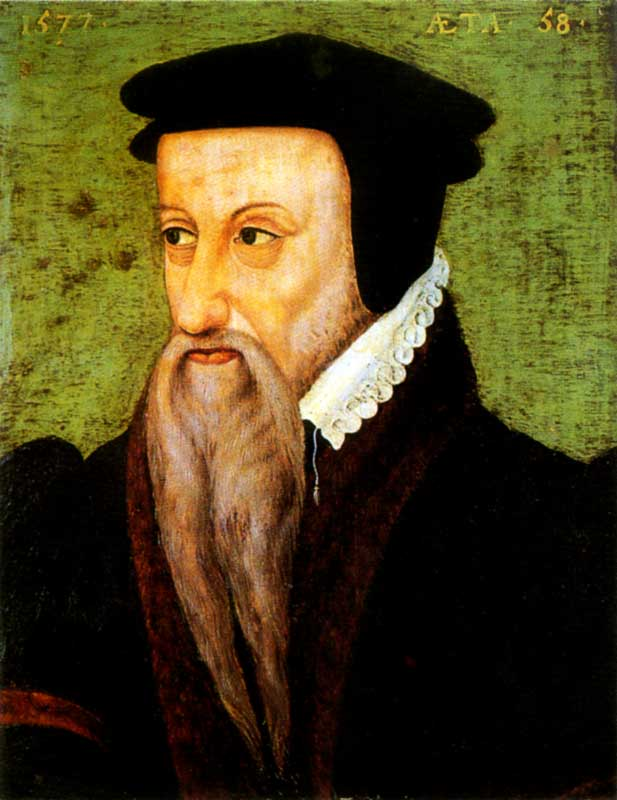
Theodore Beza

- 4 August – Charles I, Duke of Elbeuf, nobleman (born 1556)
- 23 September – Pontus de Tyard, poet (born c.1521)
- 13 October – Theodore Beza, Protestant reformer (born 1519)
- 3 December – Guy XX de Laval, nobleman (born 1585)
