= Badding Rug =

Cross-stitch needlepoint rug

The Badding Rug is a Victorian cross-stitch needlepoint made in 1950 entirely by hand by Carolyn Badding of San Leandro, California. Measuring 12 feet by 15 feet, worked onto a canvas backing of seven strips assembled to be one piece before any stitching began, it features approximately 1,260,000 stitches in French wool.

Research done prior to its completion revealed no record of any needlepoint rug of the proportions of the Badding Rug completed by any American citizen. This rug was credited in numerous news articles to be a masterpiece in needlepoint. The Badding Rug was compared to one owned by Queen Mary that was fashioned of six completed strips sewn together.

== Planning ==
Badding devoted a year of research, planning and design following the French tradition of rugmaking to assure the rug authentic in conception and execution. Lena Hostetter, a Berkeley artist, assisted by painting full size water color sketches to serve as a color guide for the needlework. The patterns were done first on graph paper, to scale, enlarged to full size, and interpreted in wool on canvas. Mabel Albright of Oakland assisted in research, material estimates and in assembling the canvas foundation strips.

== Composition ==
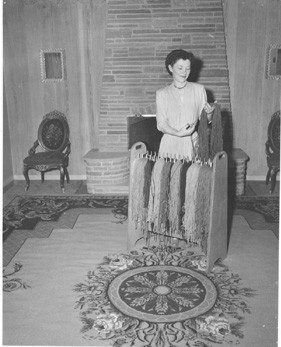
Badding (1951)

Badding found the work so fascinating that she often spent 12 to 14 hours daily at her needlework frame. She invested 5,000 hours completing it. One year was spent in actual needlework. She had expected that the rug would take her three years, but enthusiasm changed her plans and she completed it in a little more than two years.

Over 100 pounds (45 kg) or 1826 skeins of wool were imported from France. After it was re-dyed to achieve the exact colors, three solid weeks were required to untangle and sort the yarns. The design was fashioned after French Aubusson rugs of the 17th and 18th centuries. All old French rugs are classified as either Aubusson or Savonnerie. Flat weaves are called Aubusson while tufted or pile are Savonnerie. Thus, the names apply to methods and fabric – not design or coloring.

It is predominantly rose and beige hues are contrasted with a band of bright, light blue and a touch of soft gold in the border. Less predominant colors are greens, orchids, where the design called for them. In a flat weave, the Badding Rug uses many traditional motifs, such as the Grecian urn, acanthus leaves, a central medallion and a jewel border, but its overall design is original. The year the rug was created and the maker’s initials were stitched into a corner of the rug providing authentication within.

== Artist ==
Badding completed 104 pieces of needlepoint prior to taking on the rug project. These pieces were incremental in perfecting her artistic ability and consisted of chair seats, bench covers, handbags and reproductions of paintings. She had been advised by her physician to curtail her active civic schedule to lead a more sedentary life. She had incurred two illnesses including being crippled during her teenage years of eleven through sixteen. Early in the making of the rug, it occurred to her perhaps this effort could prove of value to the Children’s Hospital. Her early childhood illnesses inspired the offer of the rug as a fundraiser, so that crippled and ill children might be helped. Badding’s son weighed 2 ½ pounds at birth; hence, a fundraiser to benefit “preemies”.

This needlepoint artist was at the original exhibit at Breuners of Oakland, CA. When asked how she chose this project, Badding said, “I had two reasons. The first was because I felt that we in America sometimes place an exaggerated importance on the value and beauty of European arts and crafts. We think just because something was done in Europe, that it is therefore better. I wanted to prove that we in America could do noteworthy things in the field, too.” Her second reason for undertaking the work was her health. At the time she started the work, Badding was ordered by her doctor to rest one hour for every two hours she was up, and to undertake no strenuous work.

== Exhibition ==
In 1951, the rug was originally displayed for the public to raise funds for an incubator for the Children’s Hospital of the East Bay in Oakland, CA. Spectators flocked in to view the largest rug of its kind. It was the first fund specifically marked for premature infant care for Children’s Hospital of the East Bay.

In 1953, under the honorary chairwomanship of Mamie Eisenhower, the rug was included in exhibit to benefit the Friendship Fund of the Lighthouse. The Program for the Eighth National Exhibition of Amateur Needlework Of Today Inc. at The Hammer Galleries, New York City, April 13–25, 1953 presents names easily recognized from this historical era. Following the tradition of the times each name is preceded by the status of Mrs. - - some are Mrs. Dwight Eisenhower, Mrs. Theodore Roosevelt, Mrs. Reginald Fullerton, Mrs. George Patterson and Mrs. Montgomery Dorsey.

After Badding’s death in August 1953, the rug hung in the Mrs. Dwight D. Eisenhower Museum in New York City for 9 years. Carl “Jerry” M. Morris acquired the Badding Rug in 1973 in exchange for a twin engine 36’ Trojan Power boat. He was moving from California to Hawaii. Since there was no cost-effective way to transport his boat, he decided to accept an offer to trade it for the rug. He displayed it in his store, Shoe Tree and Things, in the Kona Coast Shopping Center in Kailua-Kona, Hawaii for 12 years. It became a well advertised and very popular tourist attraction. After Carl's return to the mainland, the Badding Rug was displayed by Alameda Historical Society - Alameda, CA for one year followed by two years in an antique store on the San Francisco Peninsula before he carefully placed it in storage where it remained until 2002.
