= 1611 in France =

- Decades: 1590s; 1600s; 1610s; 1620s; 1630s
- See also: History of France; Timeline of French history; List of years in France

Events from the year 1611 in France.

== Incumbents ==
- Monarch: Louis XIII
- Regent: Marie de' Medici

== Births ==
- September 11 – Henri de la Tour d'Auvergne, Vicomte de Turenne, Marshal of France (d. 1675)
- probable – Charles de Batz-Castelmore d'Artagnan, French count and musketeer, on which the fictional D'Artagnan from the novel The Three Musketeers is based (d. 1673)

== Deaths ==
- June 8 – Jean Bertaut, French poet (b. 1552)
- October 3 – Charles of Lorraine, Duke of Mayenne, French military leader (b. 1554)
