= 1607 in France =

- Decades: 1580s; 1590s; 1600s; 1610s; 1620s
- See also: History of France; Timeline of French history; List of years in France

Events from the year 1607 in France.

== Incumbents ==
- Monarch – Henry IV

== Events ==
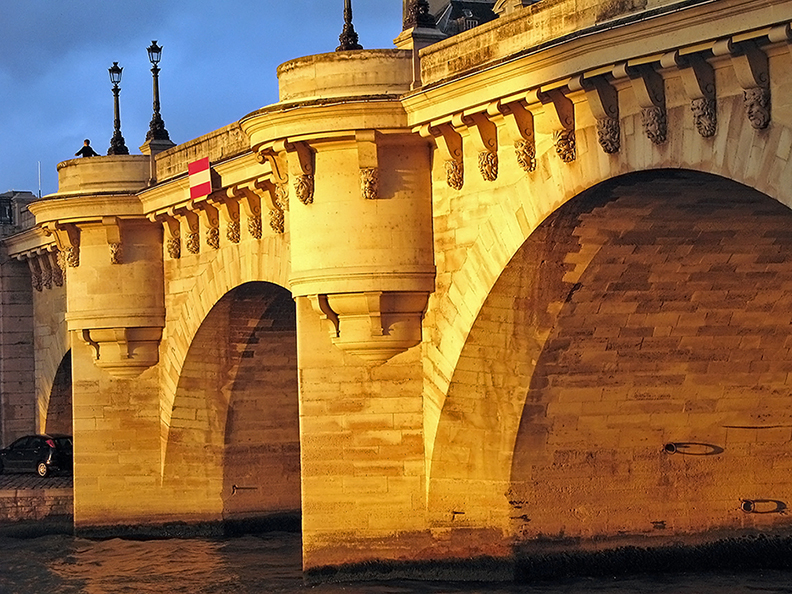
Pont Neuf inaugurated in 1607

- Pont Neuf inaugurated in Paris
- The rule of Andorra passes jointly to the king of France and the Bishop of Urgell
- 20 December – "Great Winter", 3 months of harsh weather, begins

== Births ==
- 10 January – Isaac Jogues, Jesuit priest and missionary (died 1646)
- 24 June – Jean-Jacques Renouard de Villayer, member of the Conseil d'État (died 1691)
- 10 July – Philippe Labbe, Jesuit writer (died 1667)
- 12 July – Jean Petitot, painter (died 1691).
- between 31 October and 6 December – Pierre de Fermat, mathematician (died 1665)
- 15 November – Madeleine de Scudéry, writer (died 1701)
- Full date missing – Étienne de Flacourt, governor of Madagascar (died 1660)

== Deaths ==
- 15 April – César de Bus, priest (born 1544)
- 17 May 17 – Anna d'Este, princess (born 1531)
- 5 September – Pomponne de Bellièvre, politician (born 1529)
- 7 or 9 September – Pomponne de Bellièvre, statesman (born 1529)
