= 1613 in France =

- Decades: 1590s; 1600s; 1610s; 1620s; 1630s
- See also: History of France; Timeline of French history; List of years in France

Events from the year 1613 in France.

== Incumbents ==
- Monarch – Louis XIII
- Regent: Marie de' Medici

== Births ==
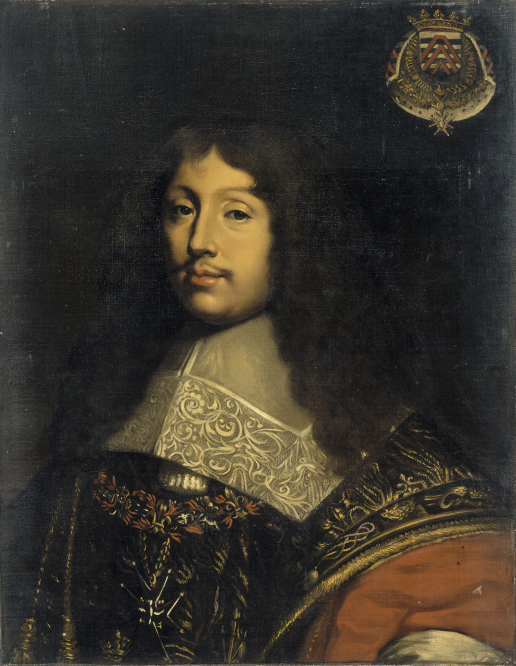
François de La Rochefoucauld

=== Full date missing ===
- François de La Rochefoucauld, writer (died 1680)
- Claude Perrault, architect (died 1688)
- André Le Nôtre, landscape architect, designed the park of the Palace of Versailles (died 1700)
- Henri Albert de La Grange d'Arquien (died 1707)
- Isaac de Benserade, poet (died 1691)

== Deaths ==
=== Full date missing ===
- Dominicus Baudius, poet (born 1561)
- Mathurin Régnier, satirist (born 1573)
- Jacques Guillemeau, surgeon (born 1550)
- Martin Ruzé de Beaulieu, politician (born c.1526)
