= 1604 in France =

- Decades: 1580s; 1590s; 1600s; 1610s; 1620s
- See also: History of France; Timeline of French history; List of years in France

Events from the year 1604 in France.

== Incumbents ==
- Monarch – Henry IV

== Events ==
- Henry IV introduces the paulette tax, allowing officeholders to make positions hereditary by paying an annual fee.
- France signs a treaty with the Ottoman Empire, strengthening trade relations with Sultan Ahmed I.
- Economic reforms continue under Maximilien de Béthune, Duke de Sully, focusing on agriculture, trade, and infrastructure.
- Henry IV advances Parisian development, working on projects like the Louvre and Place Royale.
- A special court, Chambre de l’Édit, is established to resolve disputes between Protestants and Catholics.

== Births ==
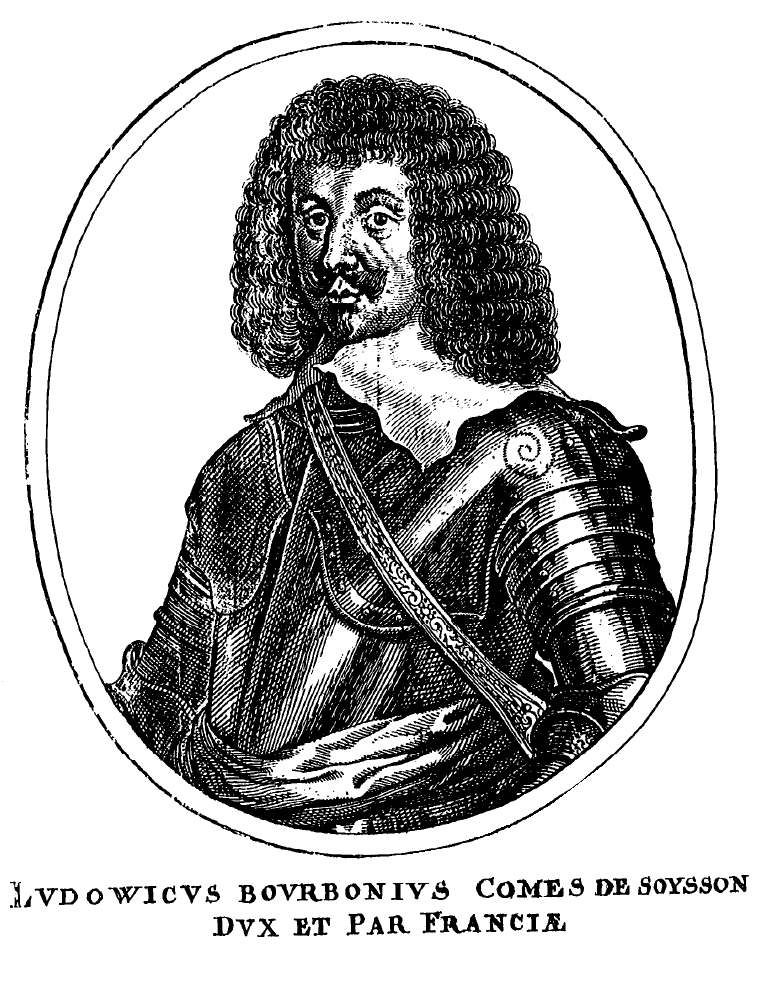
Louis, Count of Soissons

- April 5 – Charles IV, Duke of Lorraine (d. 1675)
