= 1603 in France =

- Decades: 1580s; 1590s; 1600s; 1610s; 1620s
- See also: History of France; Timeline of French history; List of years in France

Events from the year 1603 in France.

== Incumbents ==
- Monarch – Henry IV
- Governor of Poitou- Maximilien de Béthune (Sully)

== Events ==
January- The establishment of elected offices in Guyenne covering regions such as, Rouergue, Quercy, Agenais.

March 14- King Henry VI entered Metz, appointing Montigne as the Royal Lieutenant and his brother d’Arquien as the governor of the citadel.

March 15- Explorer Samuel de Champlain left France going to Canada.

June 19 to July 12- Sully, the King’s close advisor, embarked on a diplomatic mission to England. He successfully negotiated with the King of England, James VI and I, to continue the support of the Dutch against Spain, and to address financial debts owed to France.

September 1- An edict issued in Rouen, later registered by the Government of Paris, on December 2, authorised the return of Jesuits missionaries to France.

September 3- Foundation of the Jesuit College in La Flèche, which would be a significant educational institution.

November 6- King Henry VI imposed a 30% tax on goods imported or exported to Spanish territories, intensifying economic tensions between France and Spain.

December 16- Sully was appointed as the governor of Poitou, further consolidating his influence over the French government.

== Births ==
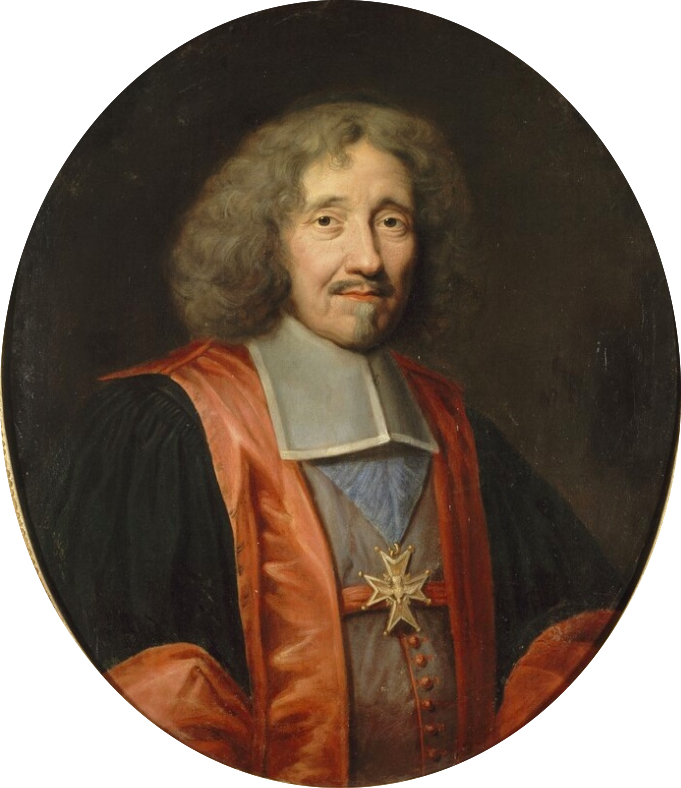
Michel Le Tellier

=== Full date missing ===
- Marie-Madeleine de Chauvigny de la Peltrie (died 1671)
- Zeno de Beauge, missionary (died 1687)
- Valentin Conrart, writer (died 1675)
- Michel Le Tellier, statesman (died 1685)

== Deaths ==
=== Full date missing ===
- Pierre Charron, Catholic theologian and philosopher (born 1541)
- Pierre de Chauvin de Tonnetuit, military officer
- Étienne Dumonstier, painter (born 1540)
- Aymar Chaste, admiral (born 1514)
