= 1608 in France =

- Decades: 1580s; 1590s; 1600s; 1610s; 1620s
- See also: History of France; Timeline of French history; List of years in France

Events from the year 1608 in France.

== Incumbents ==
- Monarch – Henry IV

== Events ==
- Until March – "Great Winter": very severe weather. The Rhône is frozen.
- 1 January – Inauguration in Paris of the Grand Galerie linking the Louvre and Tuileries Palaces.
- 23 January – Treaty of The Hague, a defensive alliance between France and the United Provinces of the Netherlands, negotiated for France by Pierre Jeannin, is signed.
- 25 March: Annunciation: Following a sermon by Franciscan Father Basile, reform of the abbey of Port-Royal-des-Champs by abbess Mother Marie Angélique Arnauld is initiated.
- March: Ursulines arrive in Paris.
- 1–16 October: Political assembly of Protestants at Jargeau.

== Births ==
- 18 March – Paul Ragueneau, Jesuit missionary (died 1680)
- 28 March – Léon Bouthillier, comte de Chavigny, Foreign Minister (died 1652)
- 15 April – Honoré Fabri, mathematician (died 1688)
- 24 April – Gaston, Duke of Orléans, third son of King Henry IV (died 1660)
- 15 May – René Goupil, Jesuit lay missionary (martyred 1642)
- 20 August – Ludovicus a S. Carolo, monk (died 1670)
- 20 September – Jean-Jacques Olier, Catholic priest (died 1657)
- 3 October – Nicole, Duchess of Lorraine, noble (died 1657)
- Full date missing – Antoine Le Maistre, lawyer, author and translator (died 1658)

== Deaths ==
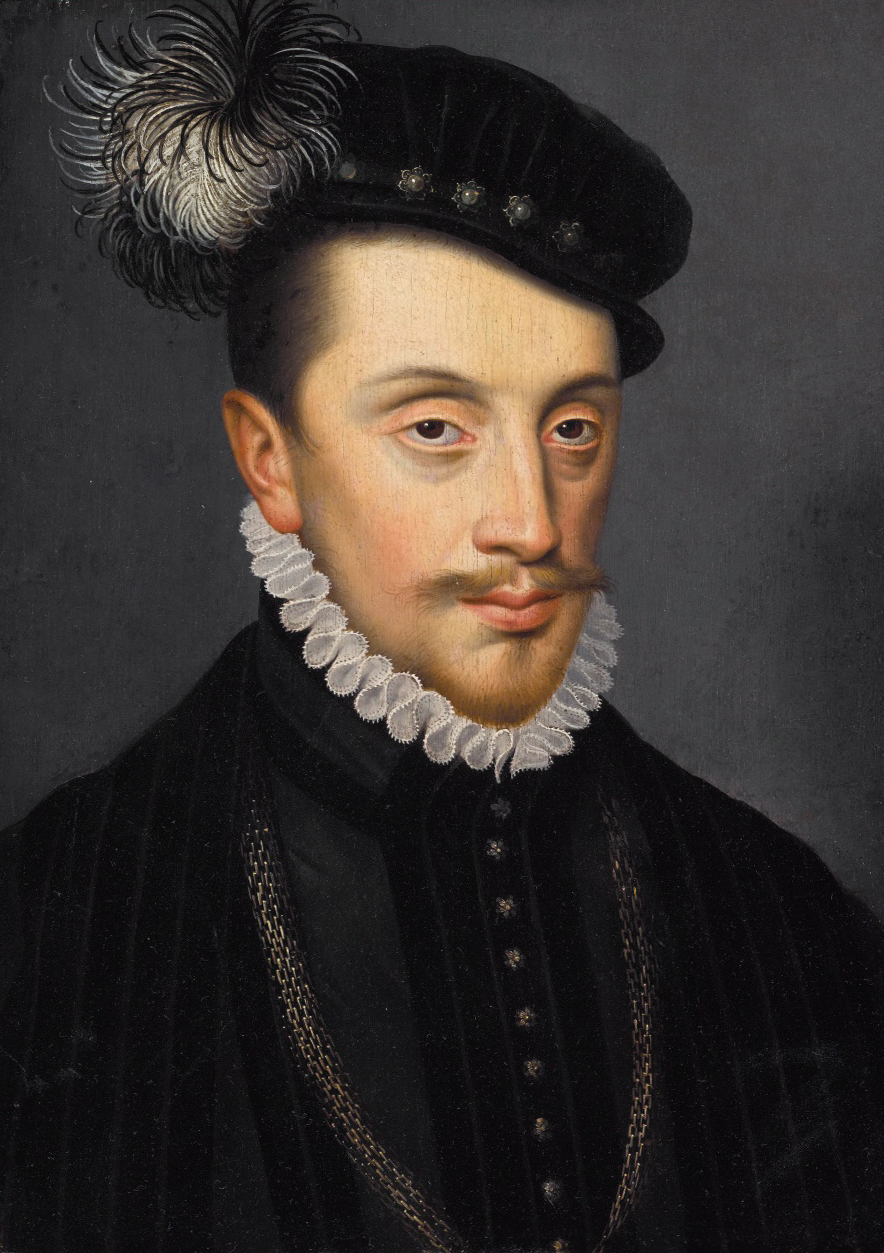
Charles III, Duke of Lorraine

- 18 January – Jacques Couet, pastor (born 1546)
- 16 February – Nicolas Rapin, magistrate and satirist (born 1535)
- 27 February – Henri, Duke of Montpensier, noble (born 1573)
- 8 March – René Benoît, religious confessor (born 1521)
- 12 April – Pierre Brûlart, seigneur de Genlis, statesman (born c.1535)
- 14 May – Charles III, Duke of Lorraine (born 1543)
- 28 September – Henri, Duke of Joyeuse, military general (born 1563)

=== Full date missing ===
- Jean Vauquelin de la Fresnaye, poet (born 1536)
- Nicolas de Montreux, nobleman, novelist, poet and playwright (born c.1561)
- Petrus Morinus, biblical scholar (born 1531)
