= 1612 in France =

- Decades: 1590s; 1600s; 1610s; 1620s; 1630s
- See also: History of France; Timeline of French history; List of years in France

Events from the year 1612 in France.

== Incumbents ==
- Monarch – Louis XIII
- Regent: Marie de' Medici

== Events ==
- Starting of Equinoctial France, French colonization efforts around Equator in South America

== Births ==
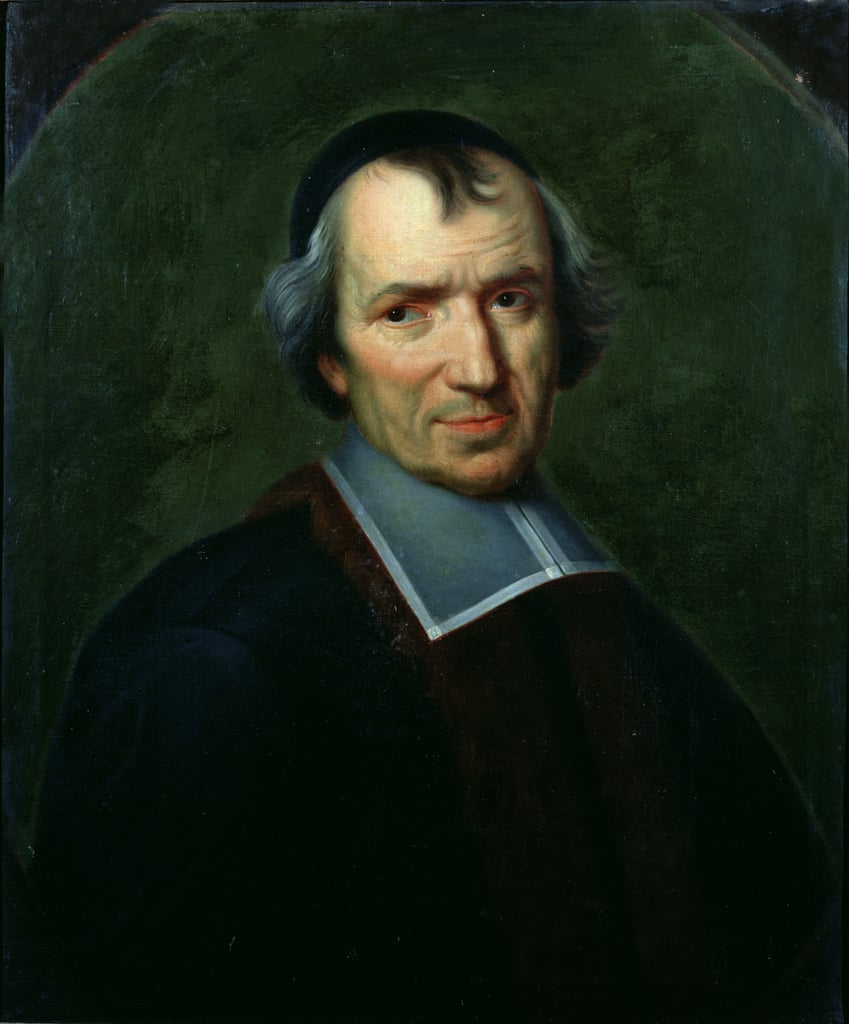
Antoine Arnauld

- 6 February – Antoine Arnauld, Roman Catholic theologian, philosopher, and mathematician (d. 1694)
- 10 August – Charles de Grimaldi-Régusse, aristocrat, landowner and politician (d. 1687)

=== Full date missing ===
- François Byssot de la Rivière (d. 1673)
- Louis Ferdinand Elle the Elder, portrait painter (d. 1689)

== Deaths ==
- 24 January – Honoré du Laurens, archbishop (b. 1554)
- 1 November – Charles, Count of Soissons, prince du sang and military commander (b. 1566)

=== Full date missing ===
- Thomas de Leu, engraver, publisher, and print dealer (b. 1560)
