= 1614 in France =

- Decades: 1590s; 1600s; 1610s; 1620s; 1630s
- See also: History of France; Timeline of French history; List of years in France

Events from the year 1614 in France.

== Incumbents ==
- Monarch: Louis XIII
- Regent: Marie de' Medici (until 27 September)

== Events ==
- The French Estates General meets for the last time before the era of the French Revolution. In the interim, the Kingdom of France will be governed as an absolute monarchy.

== Births ==
- Brother Lawrence of the Resurrection

== Deaths ==
- July 1 – Isaac Casaubon, French-born classical scholar (b. 1559)
- July 15 – Pierre de Bourdeille, seigneur de Brantôme, French historian and biographer
