= 1609 in France =

- Decades: 1580s; 1590s; 1600s; 1610s; 1620s
- See also: History of France; Timeline of French history; List of years in France

Events from the year 1609 in France.

== Incumbents ==
- Monarch – Henry IV

== Events ==
- 29 June – Action of 29 June 1609

== Births ==
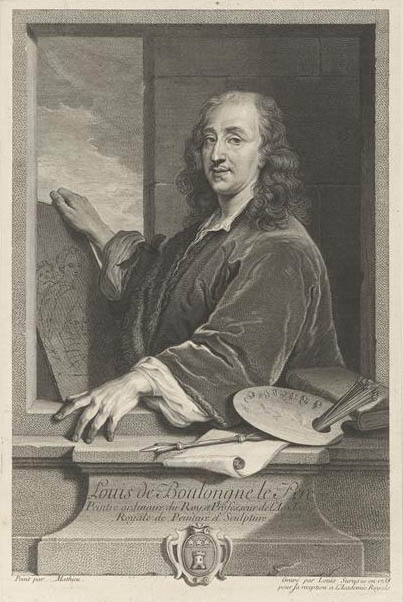
Louis Boullogne

- 25 November – Henrietta Maria, Queen of England, Scotland, and Ireland (died 1669)

=== Full date missing ===
- Louis Boullogne, painter (died 1674)
- Jean de Gassion, military commander (died 1647)

== Deaths ==
=== Full date missing ===
- André du Laurens, physician (born 1558)
- Eustache Du Caurroy, composer (born 1549)
- Joseph Justus Scaliger, scholar (born 1540)
- Isabelle de Limeuil, noblewoman (born c.1535)
