= 1618 in France =

- Decades: 1590s; 1600s; 1610s; 1620s; 1630s
- See also: History of France; Timeline of French history; List of years in France

Events from the year 1618 in France.

== Incumbents ==
- Monarch – Louis XIII

== Events ==
- Catherine de Vivonne, marquise de Rambouillet, begins remodelling the Paris residence which becomes the Hôtel de Rambouillet to form a literary salon.

== Births ==
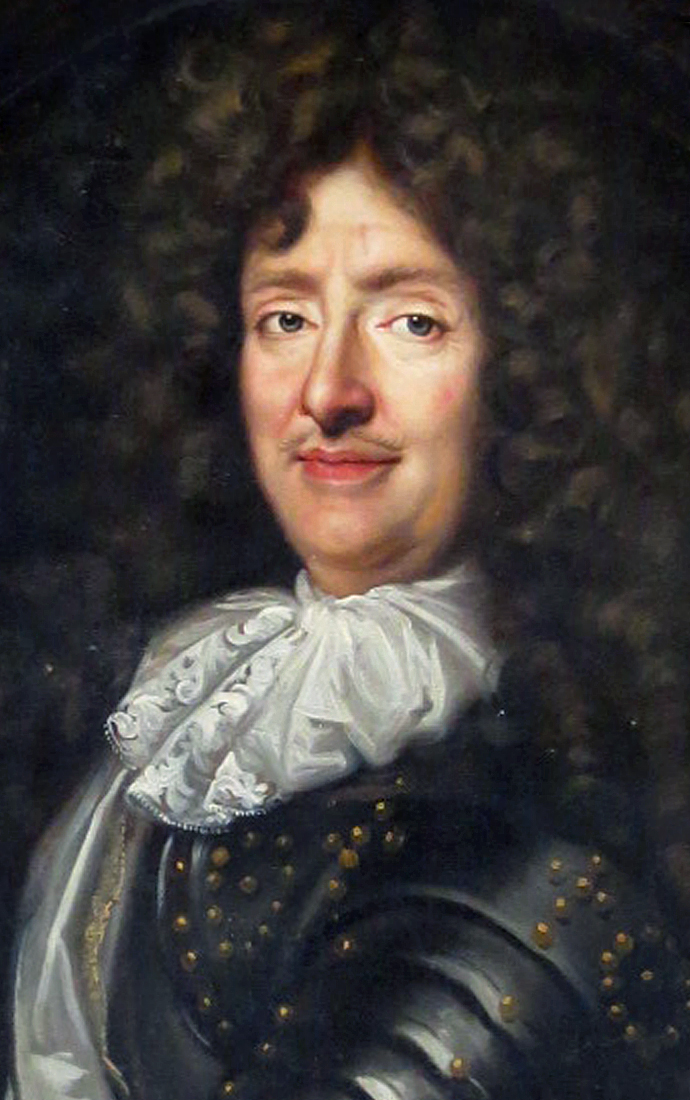
Roger de Rabutin, Comte de Bussy

- January 8 – Madeleine Béjart, actress and theatre director (d. 1672)

=== Full date missing ===
- Roger de Rabutin, Comte de Bussy, memoirist (died 1693)
- François Blondel, architect (died 1686)
- Lambert Closse, merchant (died 1662)
- Médard des Groseilliers, explorer and fur trader (died 1696)
- Simon Arnauld, Marquis de Pomponne, diplomat and minister (died 1699)

== Deaths ==
=== Full date missing ===
- Jacques Davy Duperron, cardinal (born 1556)
- François de Boivin, chronicler
