= 1617 in France =

- Decades: 1590s; 1600s; 1610s; 1620s; 1630s
- See also: History of France; Timeline of French history; List of years in France

Events from the year 1617 in France.

== Incumbents ==
- Monarch: Louis XIII

== Events ==
- April 24 – Encouraged by Charles d'Albert, the seventeen-year-old Louis XIII, king of France, forces his mother Marie de Medici, who has held de facto power, into retirement and has her favourite, Concino Concini, assassinated.
- November 14 – L’Union de la Boîte was founded.

== Births ==
- November 19 – Eustache Le Sueur, French painter (d. 1655)
