= Pierre-Antoine Patel =

French painter

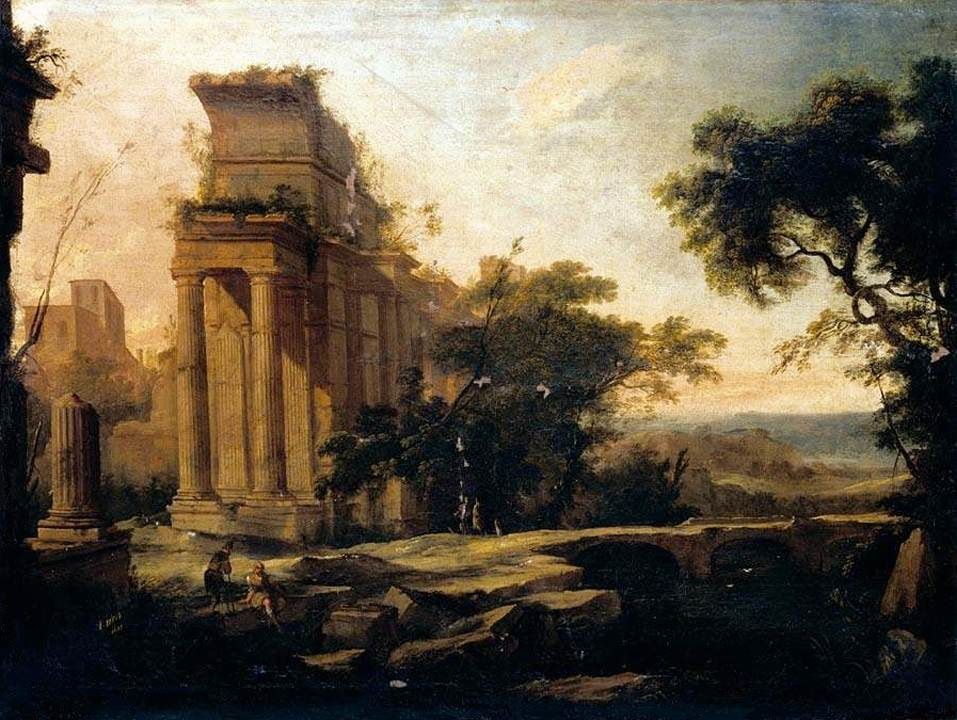
- A Classical Landscape, 1697, Private collection
- Born: November 22, 1648; Paris
- Died: March 17, 1707 (aged 58); Paris
- Education: Académie de Saint-Luc
- Known for: Landscape painting

Pierre-Antoine Patel (November 22, 1648 – March 17, 1707), also known as Patel the Younger, was a French landscape painter. He was the son of Pierre Patel, also a renowned landscape painter, who, like many French painters of his generation, was influenced by the landscapes of Italy painted by Claude Lorrain. The younger Patel distinguished himself from his father by specializing in small, finely finished landscapes in gouache, an opaque watercolor. The majority of his works depict antique ruins, bathed in sunlight.

His paintings hang in, among other places, the Hermitage, Warsaw National Museum, Princeton University Art Museum, and a number of French museums including three works in the Louvre.

== Gallery ==
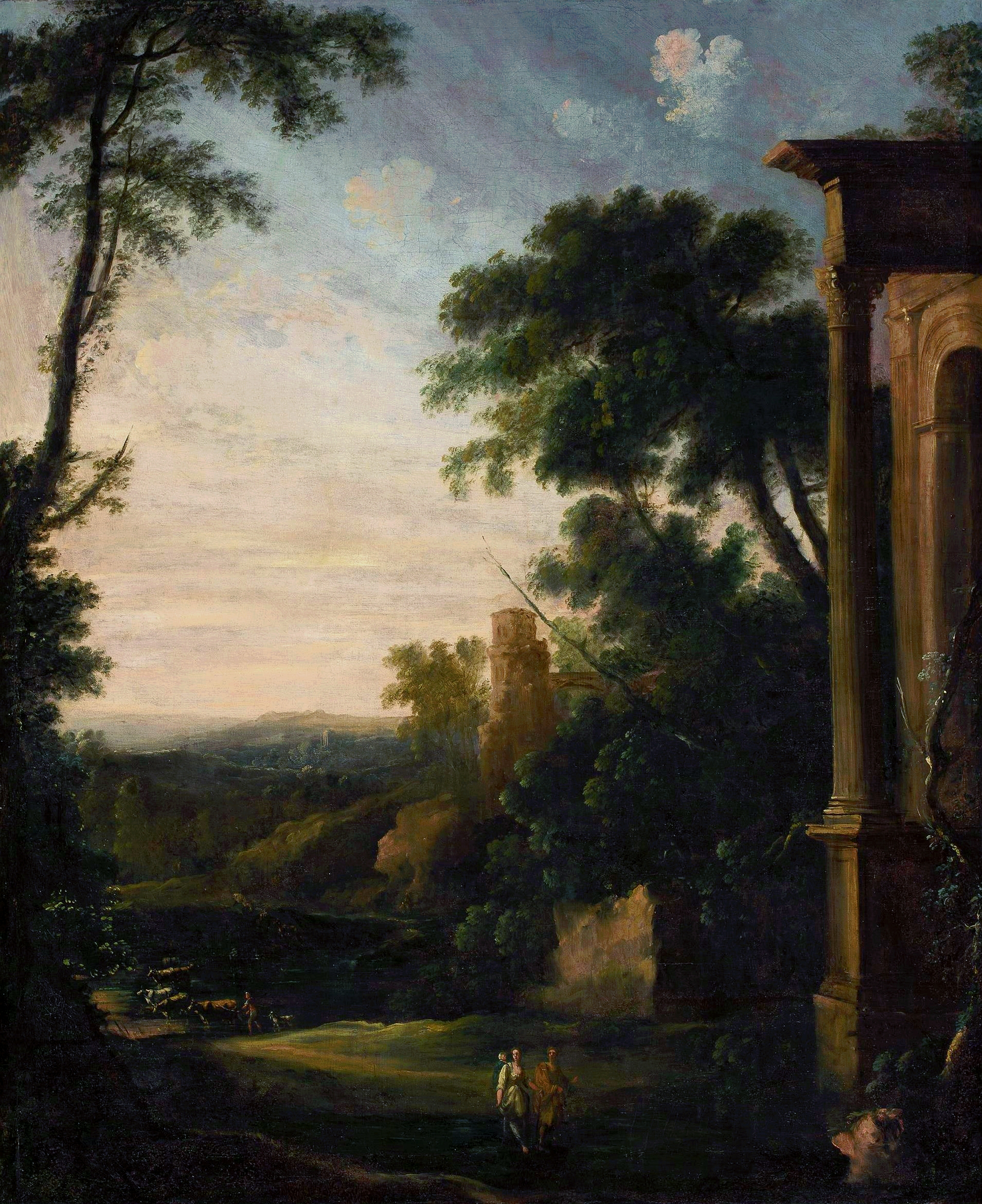
Landscape with architecture and staffage, 1700–07, National Museum, Warsaw

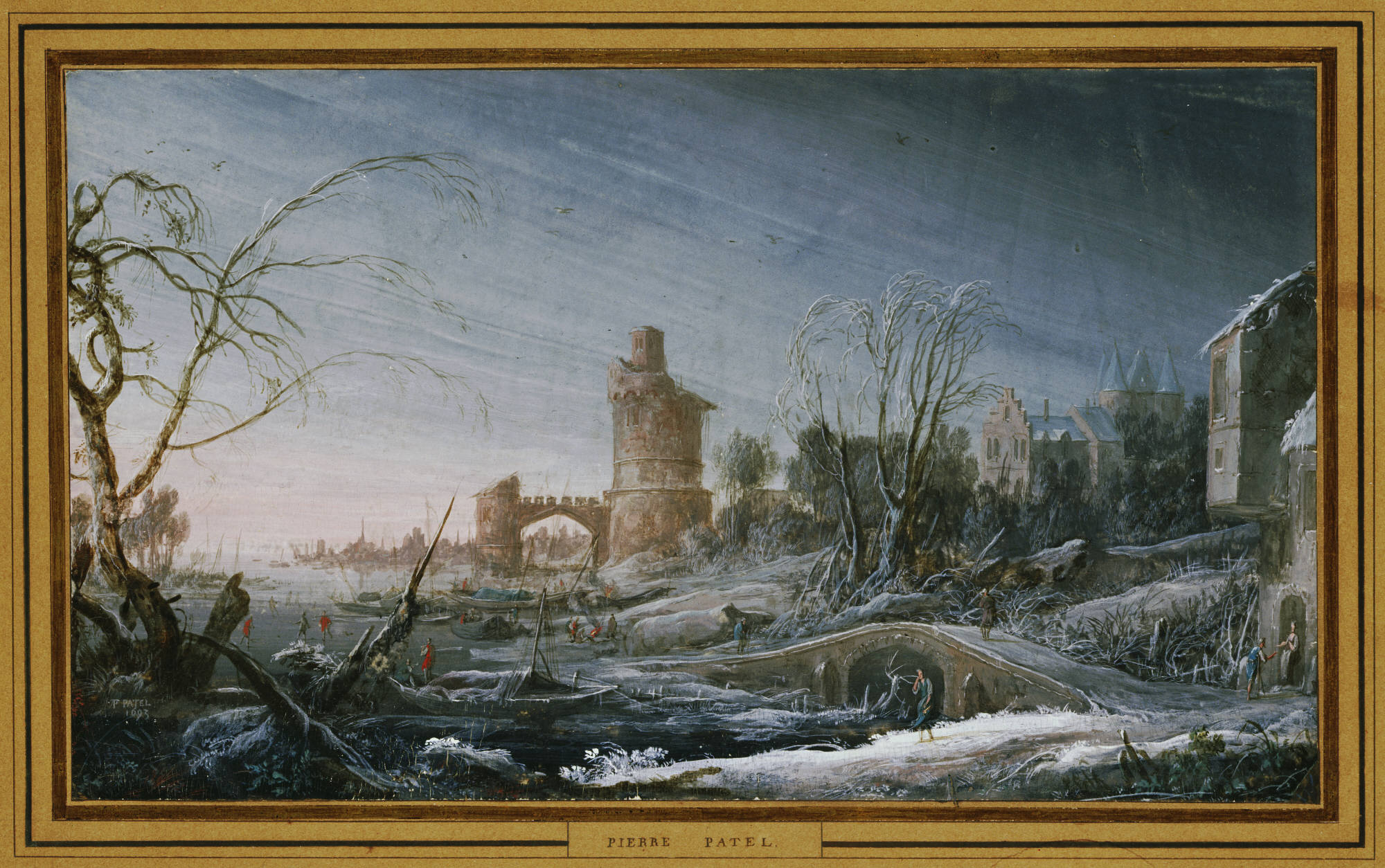
Winter landscape with bridge and castle, 1693, Princeton University Art Museum
