= 1610 in France =

- Decades: 1590s; 1600s; 1610s; 1620s; 1630s
- See also: History of France; Timeline of French history; List of years in France

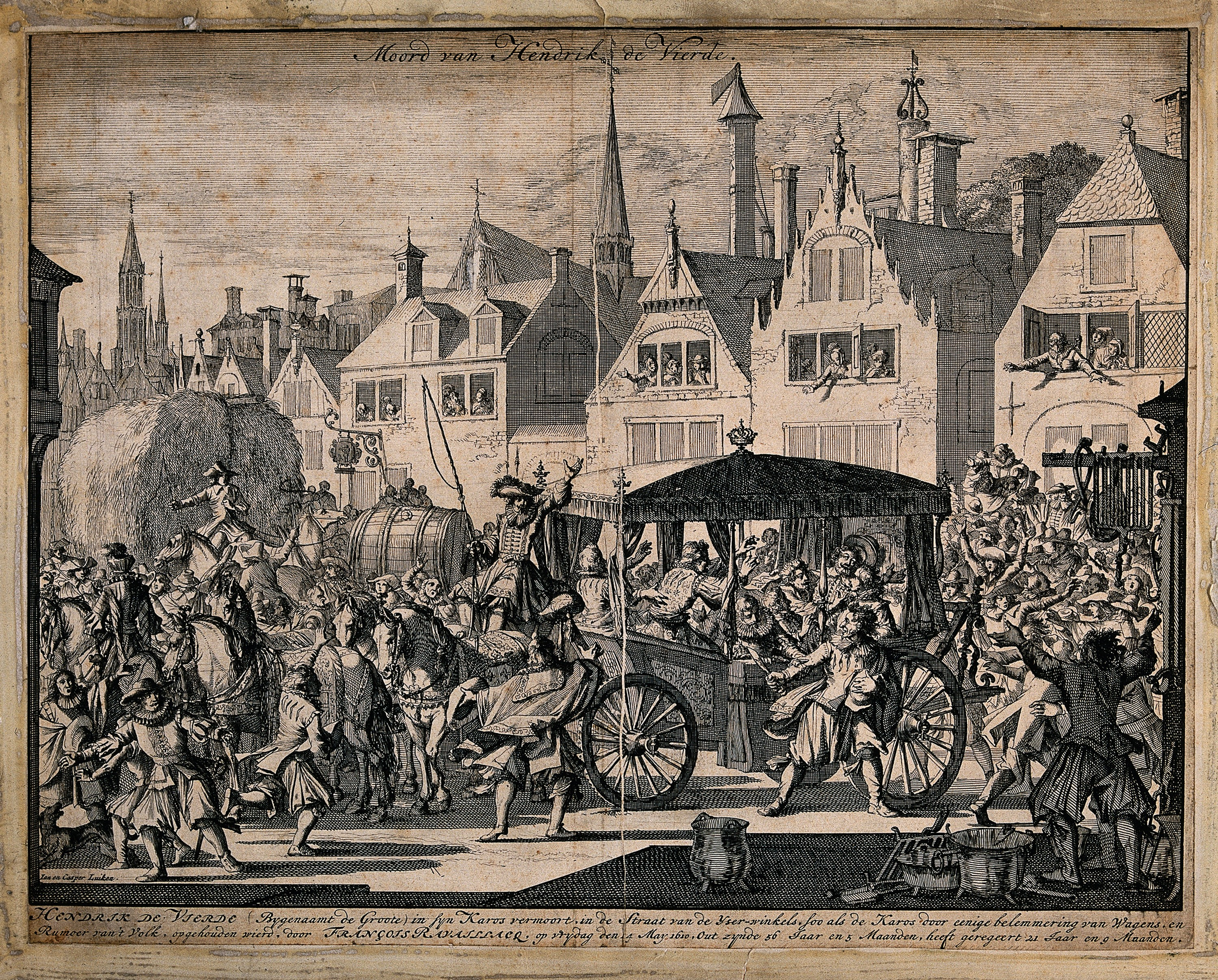
The assassination of Henry IV, King of France in 1610. Etching by J. and C. Luyken (bef. 1709).

Events of the year 1610 in France.

== Incumbents ==
- Monarch: Henry IV (until 14 May), then Louis XIII
- Regent: Marie de' Medici (from 14 May)

== Events ==
- May 13 – Marie de' Medici is crowned Queen of France at the Basilica of Saint-Denis.
- May 14 – Henry IV, King of France, is fatally stabbed by François Ravaillac during a parade marking the recent coronation of his wife; he is succeeded by his 8-year-old son Louis.
- May 15 – By the first lit de justice of Louis XIII, his mother Marie de' Medici is proclaimed regent of France.
- May 27 – Regicide François Ravaillac is executed by being pulled apart by horses in the Place de Grève, Paris.
- October 17 – Louis XIII is crowned King of France at Reims Cathedral.

== Births ==
- February 2 – Pierre Bourdelot, physician, anatomist, freethinker, abbé and libertine (died 1685)
- February 13 – Jean de Labadie, mystic (died 1674)
- April 1 – Charles de Saint-Évremond, soldier and writer (died 1703)
- By July 10 – Louis Maimbourg, Jesuit historian (died 1686)
- October 6 – Charles de Sainte-Maure, duc de Montausier, soldier (died 1690)
- François Eudes de Mézeray, historian (died 1683)
- Abraham Duquesne, naval officer (died 1688)
- Marie Meurdrac, chemist and alchemist (died 1680)

== Deaths ==
- January 1 – François Feuardent, theologian (born 1539)
- February 27 – Philippe Canaye, diplomat (born 1551)
- May 14 – King Henry IV of France, assassinated (born 1553)
- May 27 – François Ravaillac, assassin of Henry IV, executed (born 1578)
