= 1606 in France =

- Decades: 1580s; 1590s; 1600s; 1610s; 1620s
- See also: History of France; Timeline of French history; List of years in France

Events from the year 1606 in France.

== Incumbents ==
- Monarch – Henry IV

== Events ==
- February 12 – Maximilien de Béthune becomes 1st Duke of Sully in the Peerage of France.
- February 24 – Commercial treaty between France and England signed in Paris.
- March 15 – The king leaves Paris to besiege Sedan and end the revolt of the Duke of Bouillon, who submits on April 2. On April 6 the king enters the town and on April 28 returns to Paris.
- March 22 – The assembly of the French clergy grants the king a "free gift" (dons gratuits) of 130,000 livres.
- April 2 – Treaty for the protection of the Principality of Sedan.
- June 3 – The Duke of Sully is named captain lieutenant in the Queen’s company.
- June 9 – Accident at the Neuilly-sur-Seine ferry: the king and queen with others of the court, returning from Saint-Germain to Paris, nearly drown. The king orders construction of the first, wooden, Pont de Neuilly, built between 1609 and 1611.
- December 18 – Richelieu is nominated Bishop of Luçon.
- December – Edict on reform of the Catholic clergy.

== Births ==
- February 10 – Christine of France, Duchess of Savoy (d. 1663)
- February 27 – Laurent de La Hyre, Baroque painter (d. 1656)
- April 6 – Amable de Bourzeys, writer and academic (d. 1672)
- June 6 – Pierre Corneille, dramatist (d. 1684)
- July 13 – Roland Fréart de Chambray, architectural theorist (d. 1676)
- October 1 – Julian Maunoir, Jesuit priest (d. 1683)
- October 30 – Jean-Jacques Bouchard, erotic writer (d. 1641)
- November 12 – Jeanne Mance, nurse and settler in Montreal (d. 1673)
- date unknown
  - Pierre du Ryer, dramatist (d. 1658)
  - Charles Errard, painter, architect and engraver (d. 1689)

== Deaths ==
- March 25 – François de Bar, French scholar (b. 1538)
- October 5 – Philippe Desportes, French poet (b. 1546)
