= Pierre Patel =

French painter

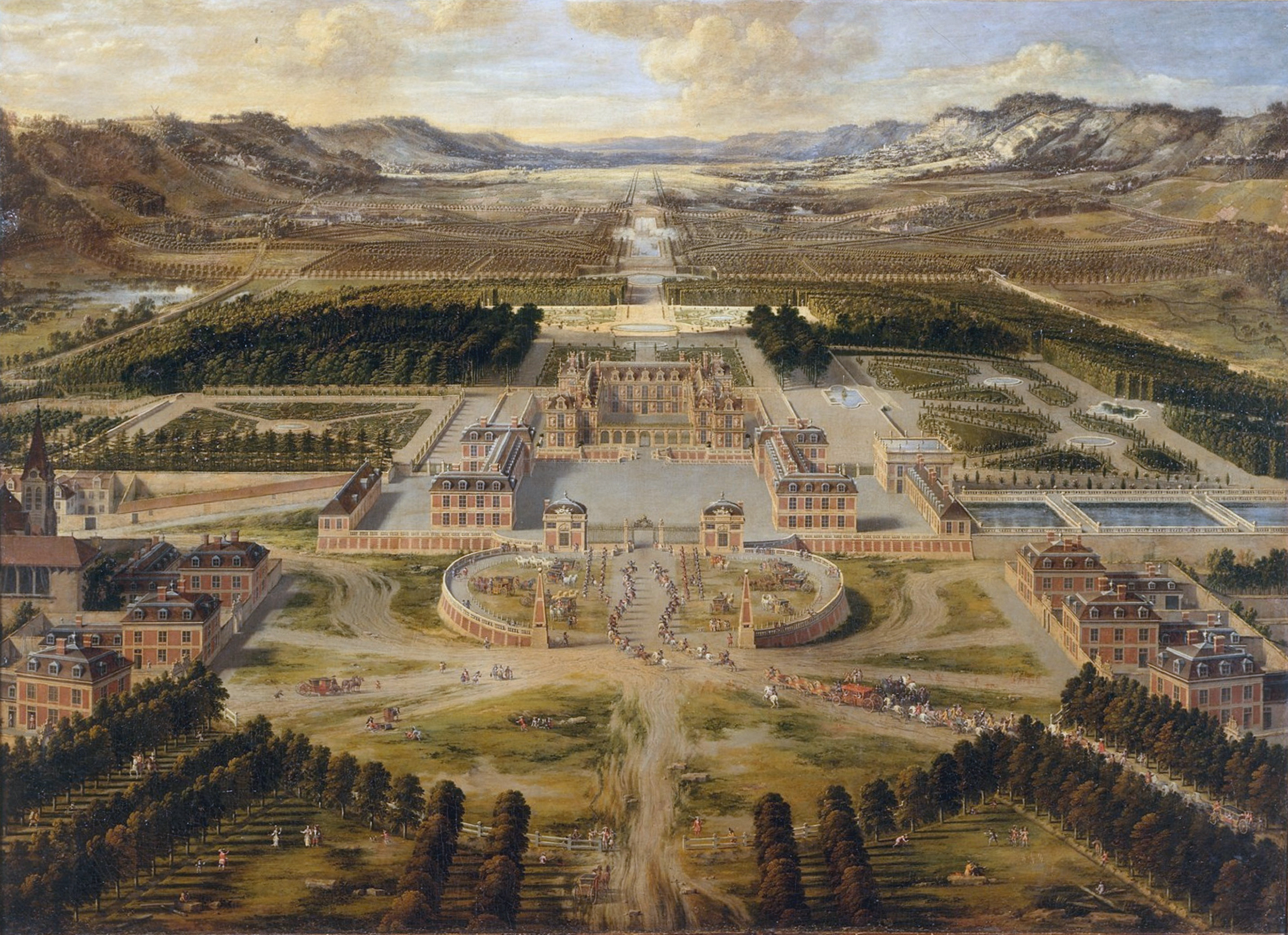
Pierre Patel, The Palace of Versailles, c. 1668

Pierre Patel (1605 – 5 August 1676) was a French painter.

Patel was born in Picardy and was admitted to the Guild of Saint-Germain-des-Prés in 1633 and the Académie de Saint-Luc in 1635. He primarily painted landscapes. In 1648 he had a son Pierre-Antoine Patel, who also became a painter. Patel died in Paris in 1676.
