= Sylvestre de Laval =

Sylvestre de Laval (1570–1616) was a French Catholic theologian.

== Life and works ==
He lived most of life in Paris, France. He was the author of two controversial books. He was a teacher of theology and philosophy. He did a lot of missionary work as well.
