= Savonnerie manufactory =

Significant French carpet manufactory

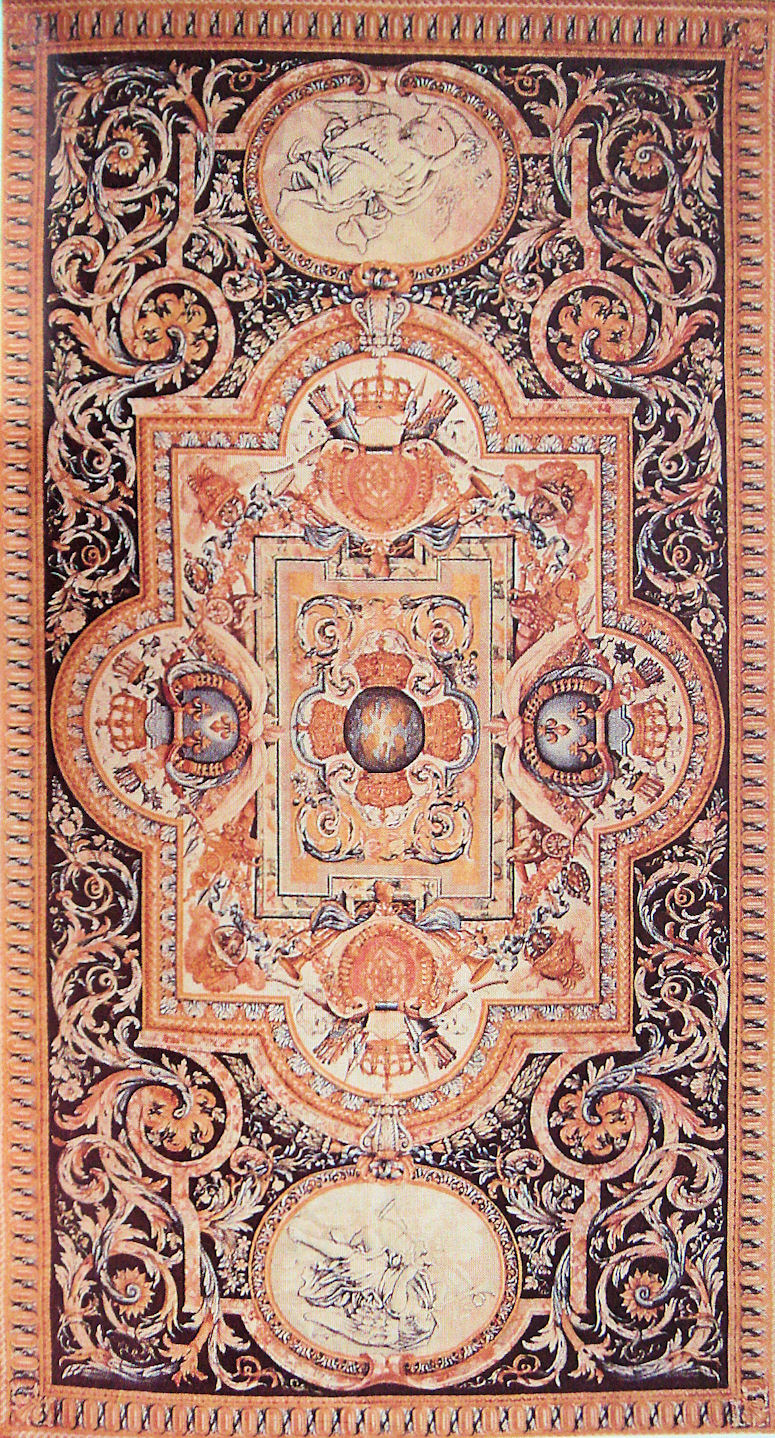
Tapis de Savonnerie, under Louis XIV, after Charles Le Brun, made for the Grande Galerie in the Louvre.

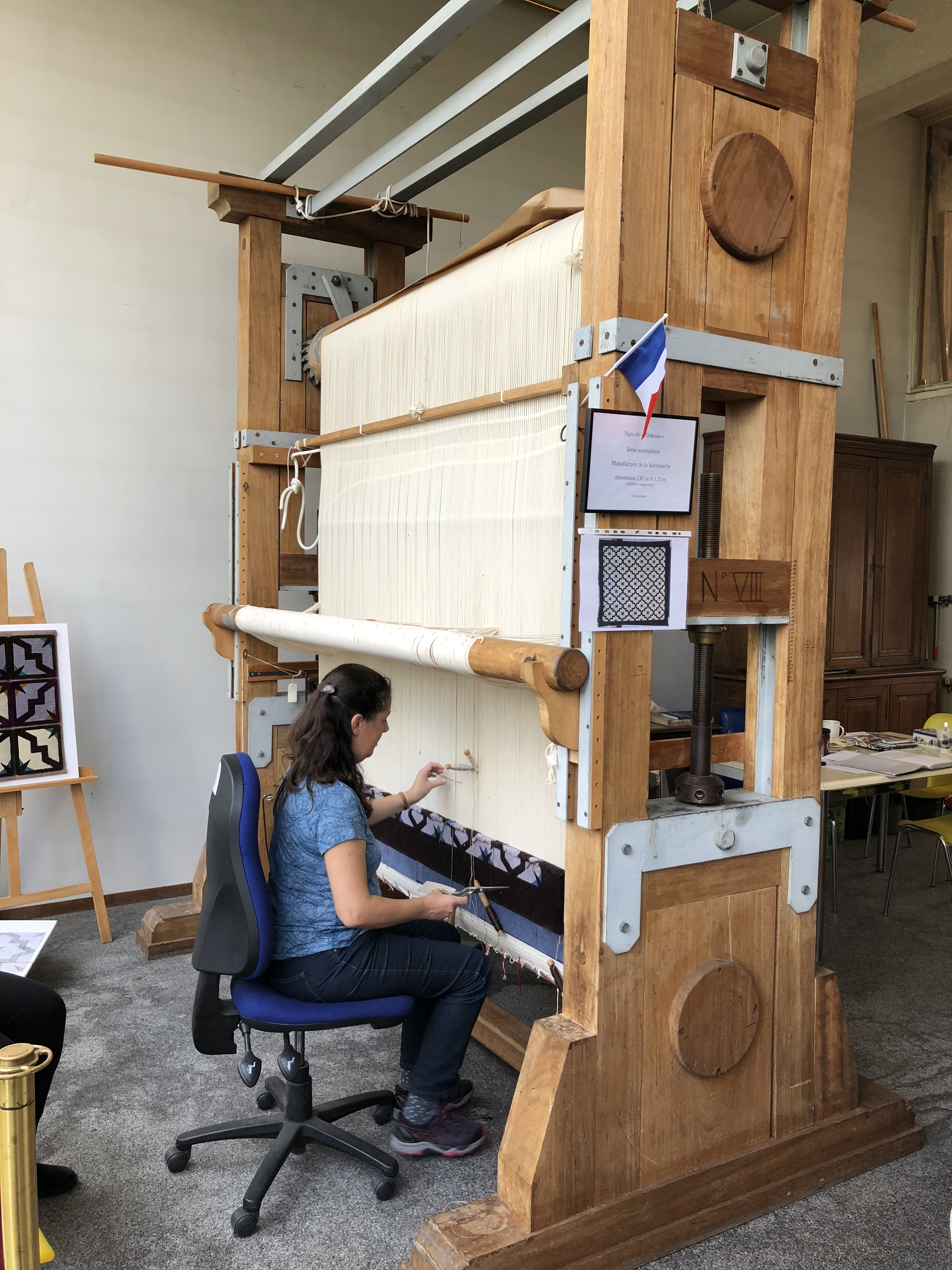
Savonnerie manufactory in 2018

The Savonnerie manufactory was the most prestigious European producer of knotted-pile carpets, particularly during its peak period from around 1650 to 1685. Due to its highly regarded reputation for quality, the Savonnerie name is sometimes erroneously used to refer to knotted-pile carpets made by other manufacturers across the globe. The Savonnerie manufactory originated from a carpet workshop that was established in a former soap factory (French savon) on the Quai de Chaillot downstream of Paris in 1615 by Pierre Dupont, who was returning from the Levant.

Under a patent (privilège) of eighteen years, a monopoly was granted by Louis XIII in 1627 to DuPont and his former apprentice Simon Lourdet, makers of carpets façon de Turquie ("in the manner of Turkey"). Until 1768, the products of the manufactory remained exclusively the property of the Crown, and Savonnerie carpets were among the grandest of French diplomatic gifts. (Note: The ambassadors of Russia, Spain, Denmark, Siam and even an unauthorized "ambassador" from Persia were all presented with Savonnerie carpets (Standen).)

The carpets were made of wool with some silk in the small details, knotted using the Ghiordes knot, at about ninety knots to the square inch. Some early carpets broadly imitate Persian models, but the Savonnerie style soon settled into more purely French designs, pictorial or armorial framed medallions, densely massed flowers in bouquets or leafy rinceaux against deep blue, black or deep brown grounds, within multiple borders.

The Savonnerie manufactory now belongs to the Gobelins Manufactory and still employs 40 weavers.

== History of the manufacture ==
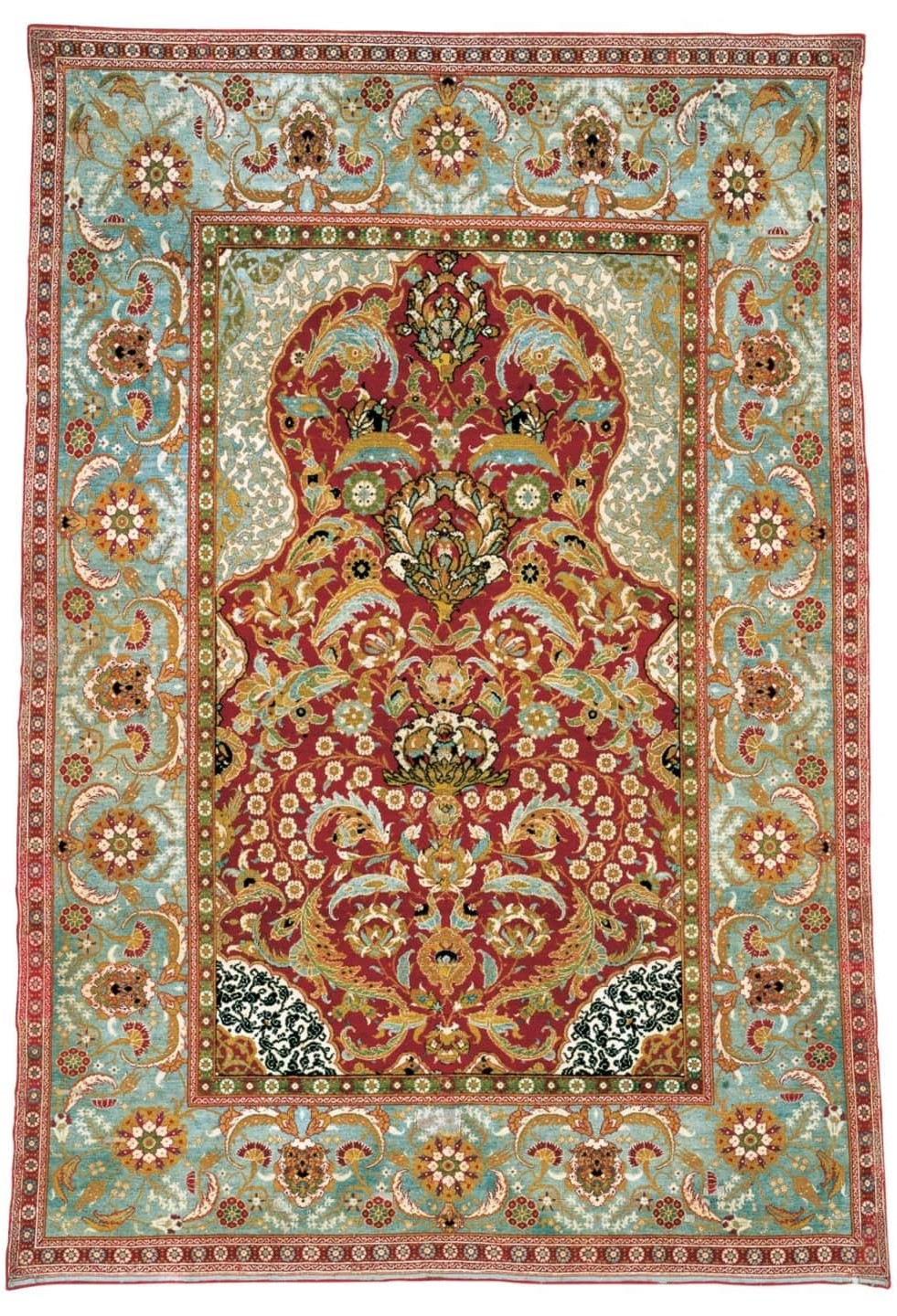
Ottoman court carpet, late 16th century, Egypt or Turkey.

The pre-history of the Savonnerie manufacture lies in the concerns of Henri IV to revive the French luxury arts, which had collapsed in the disorders of civil violence in the Wars of Religion. French silver was being drained to the Levant and Persia for the purchase of knotted-pile carpets. Among the craftsmen the king provided with studios and workshops in the galleries of the Louvre itself, was Pierre Dupont. Dupont's La Stromatourgie, ou Traité de la Fabrication des tapis de Turquie ("Treatise on the manufacture of Turkish carpets", Paris 1632) is a prime source for information on French carpet manufacturing in the early seventeenth century (Standen).

Dupont and Lourdet fell into a quarrel that lasted into the next generation. The tapestry-workers were orphan children provided by the Hôpital de Bon Port, and Lourdet gained possession of the soap-factory buildings, while Dupont continued at the Galeries du Louvre until his death in 1640; the pile carpet manufactories both flourished, providing both Cardinal Mazarin and Anne of Austria with carpets and pile hangings, now proudly made, as the documents state, façon de France, "in the French manner".

The best of the Savonnerie carpets were completed under the new contract granted in 1664 (Note: The contract was to Lourdet alone; Louis Dupont continued to occupy his royally sponsored workrooms at the Louvre until 1671, when his workshop was established at the Savonnerie, independent of that run there by Lourdet's widow (Standen).) under the general direction of Jean-Baptiste Colbert, organized along lines similar to those employed in the Gobelins and commissioning the unequalled series of thirteen carpets for the Galerie d'Apollon and ninety-three for the Grande Galerie of the Louvre, (Note: The Grande Galerie du Bord de l'Eau that is the Louvre's present long paintings gallery.) which, though all but one were completed by 1683, were never used, Louis XIV's attention having become entirely fixed on Versailles, while the Grand Galerie was now used for displaying maps and plans of fortifications rather than royal levées. Nevertheless, a fortune was spent on the carpets, which were paid for at the rate of 165 livres per aune, which measured 118.8 square centimeter/46 and a half square inches. The designs were from the king's painter Charles Le Brun, realized as full-scale cartoons by two painters from the Gobelins; Le Brun was carrying out ceiling paintings in the same galleries. Weaving began in 1668 and the first carpets for the Grande Galerie were delivered towards the end of that year (Wrightsman catalogue, no. 277). Some thirty-five complete carpets remain in the French Mobilier National today.

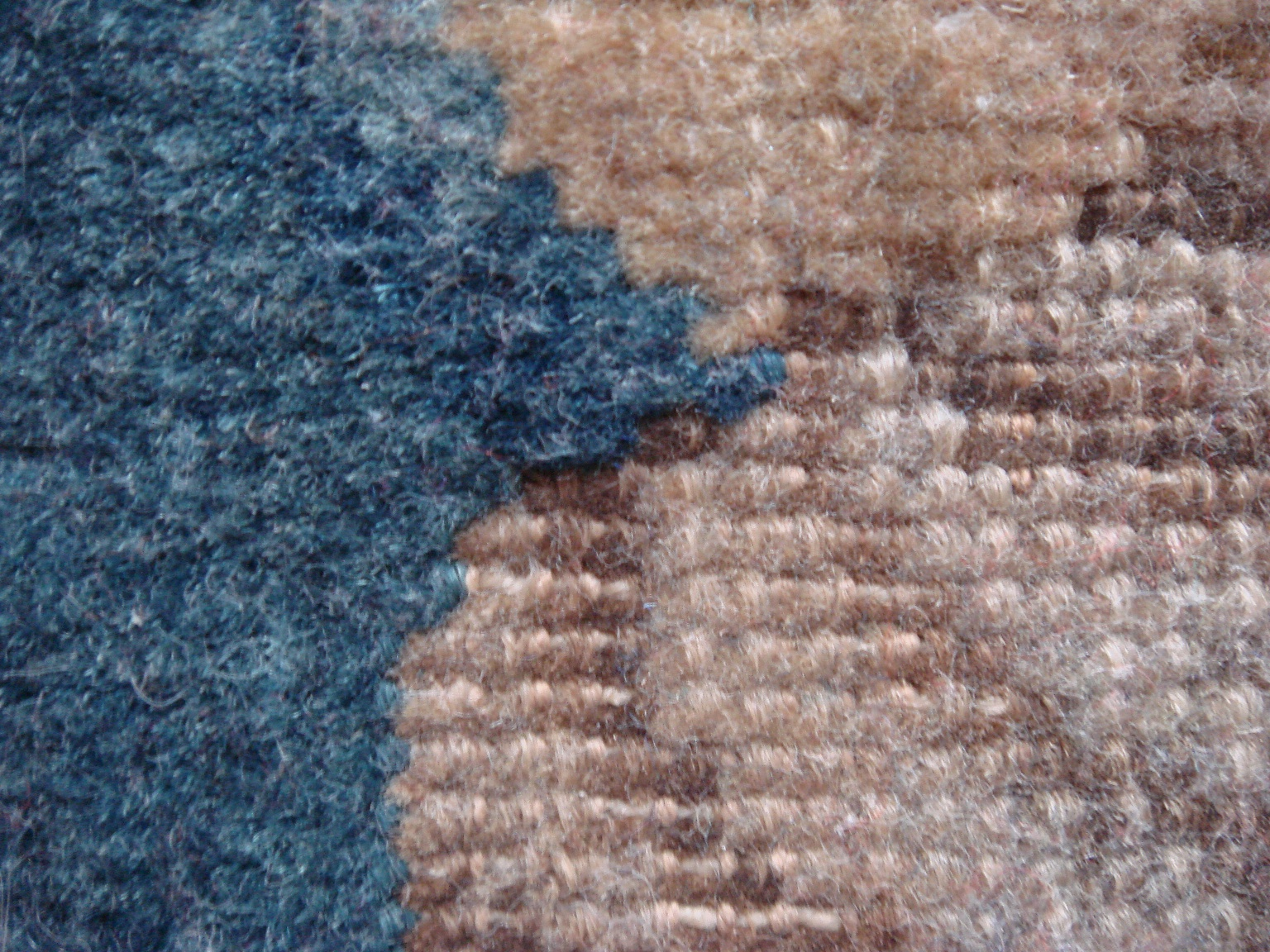
Savonnerie carpet detail.

In its heyday, the Savonnerie took sixty orphans aged ten to twelve and apprenticed them for six years, at the end of which term, one would be granted the maîtrise while the others would remain journeymen. The children were taught the art of design as well, a painter from the Académie coming once a month to inspect their projects. Later, under the financial stringencies ensuing from the wars of Louis XIV, the Savonnerie fell into eclipse, its management combined with that of the Gobelins under the direction of the architect of the Bâtiments du Roi, Robert de Cotte, its workers often unpaid, its looms frequently idle, though in 1712 it was made a Manufacture Royale.

During the 18th century attempts were made to update the manufactory's often retardataire designs, lightening and brightening the colors and introducing Rococo elements. In the later eighteenth century, Savonnerie produced panels for screens and firescreens and some wall-hangings. The Revolution saw the factory's nadir; royal crowns, cyphers and fleurs-de-lys were cut from carpets that remained in storage as insignia of féodalité. The revival of the Savonnerie is due to the patronage of Napoleon, who commissioned carpets after 1805 in the Empire style. New cartoons were designed by Percier and Fontaine and the old stock of drawings made their way into the collections of the new Louvre Museum. In 1825, the Savonnerie was incorporated with the Gobelins Manufactory, and its independent existence came to an end.

During the 19th century, a revived fashion for Savonnerie spread across Europe, as the wealthy emulated the traditional fashions of the ancien régime. Waddesdon Manor, a British house, well known for its collection of 18th-century French royal artworks, possesses multiple Savonnerie carpets.

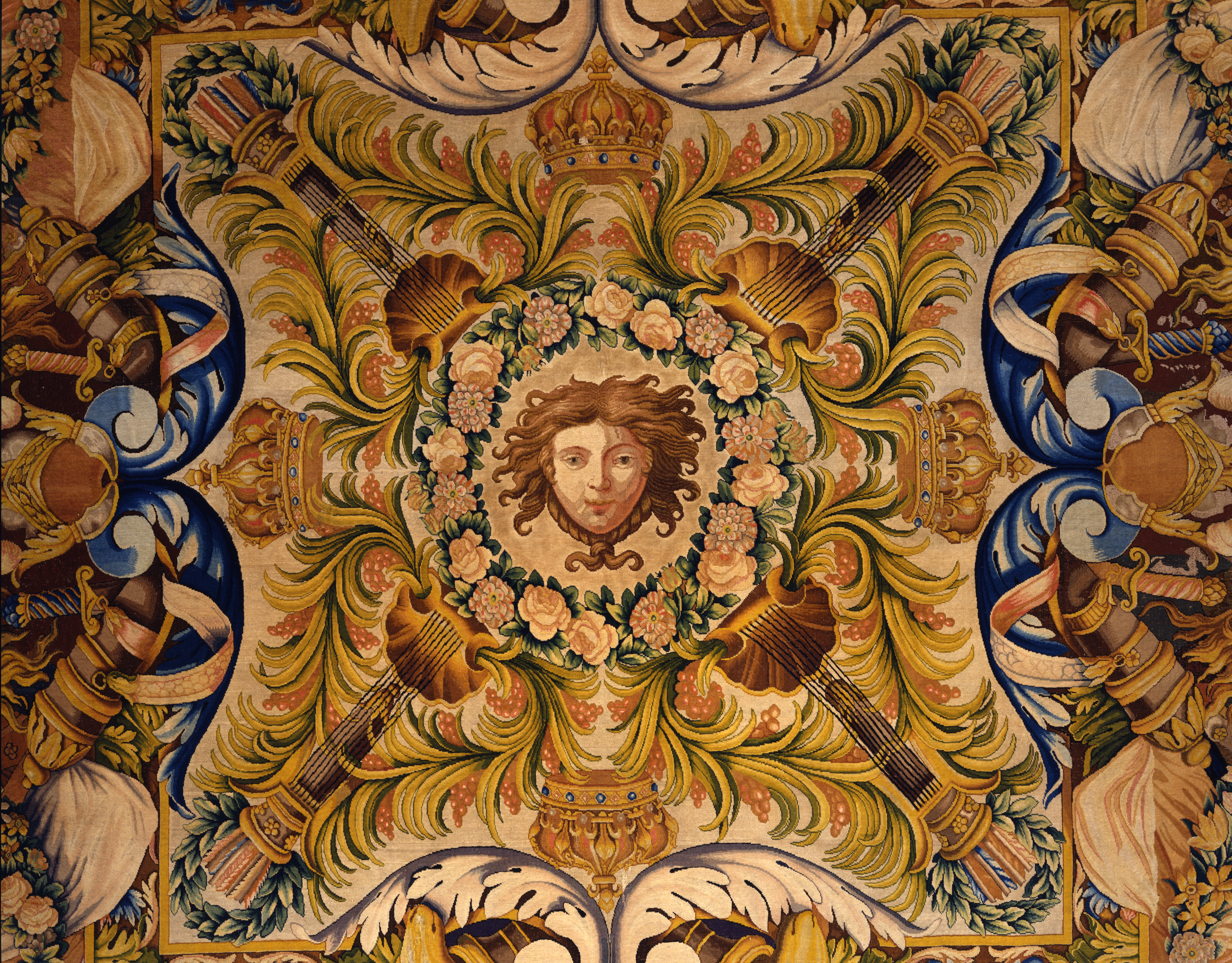
One of Waddesdon Manor's three Long Gallery carpets, out of the 93 Louis XIV commissioned from the Savonnerie factory in 1665 for the Louvre.

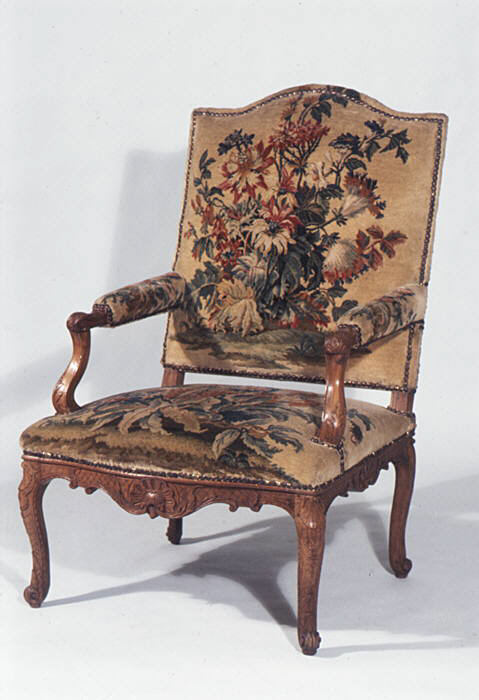
Armchair (one of a pair) at the Metropolitan Museum in New York

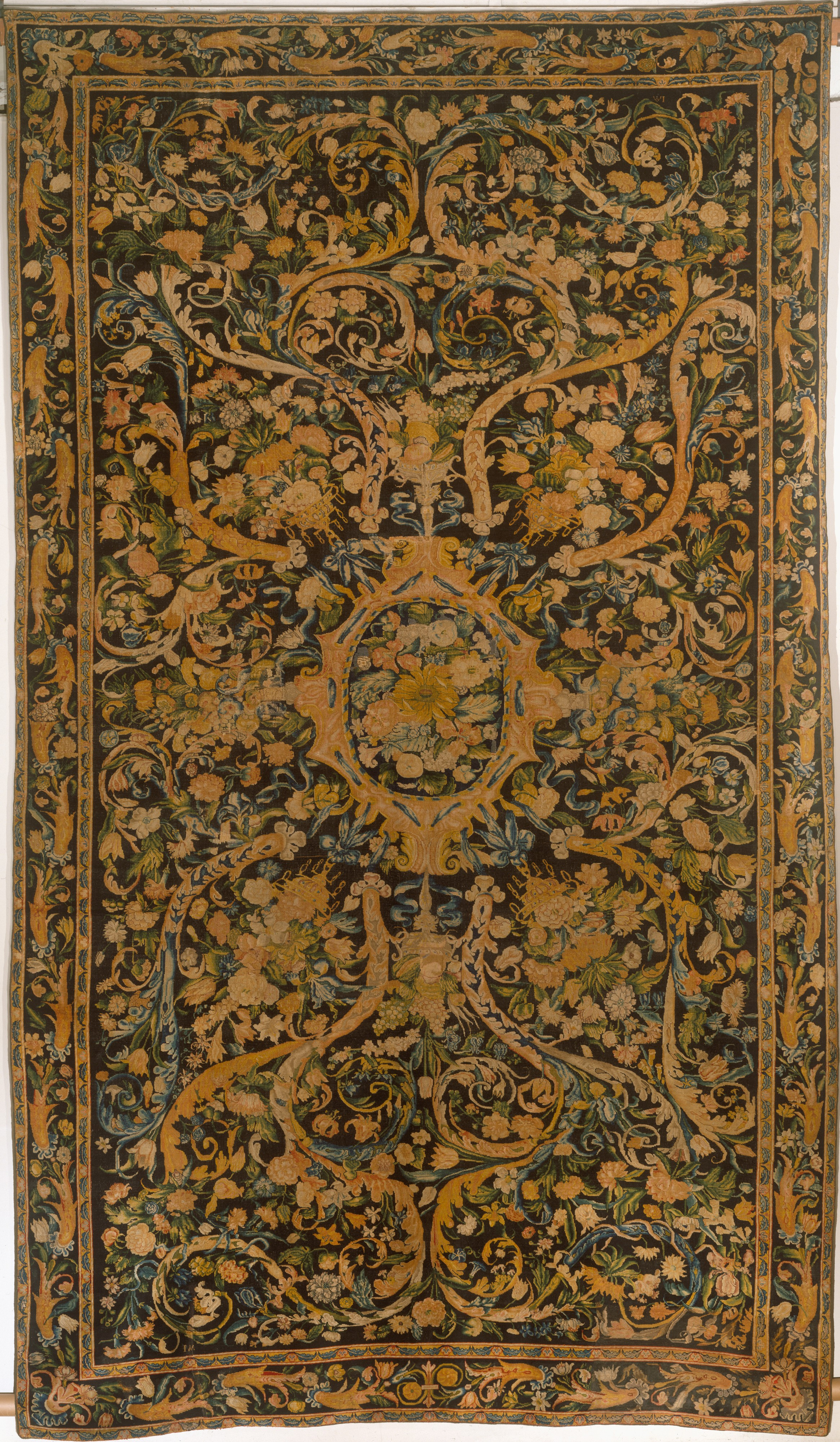
Carpet at the Metropolitan Museum in New York

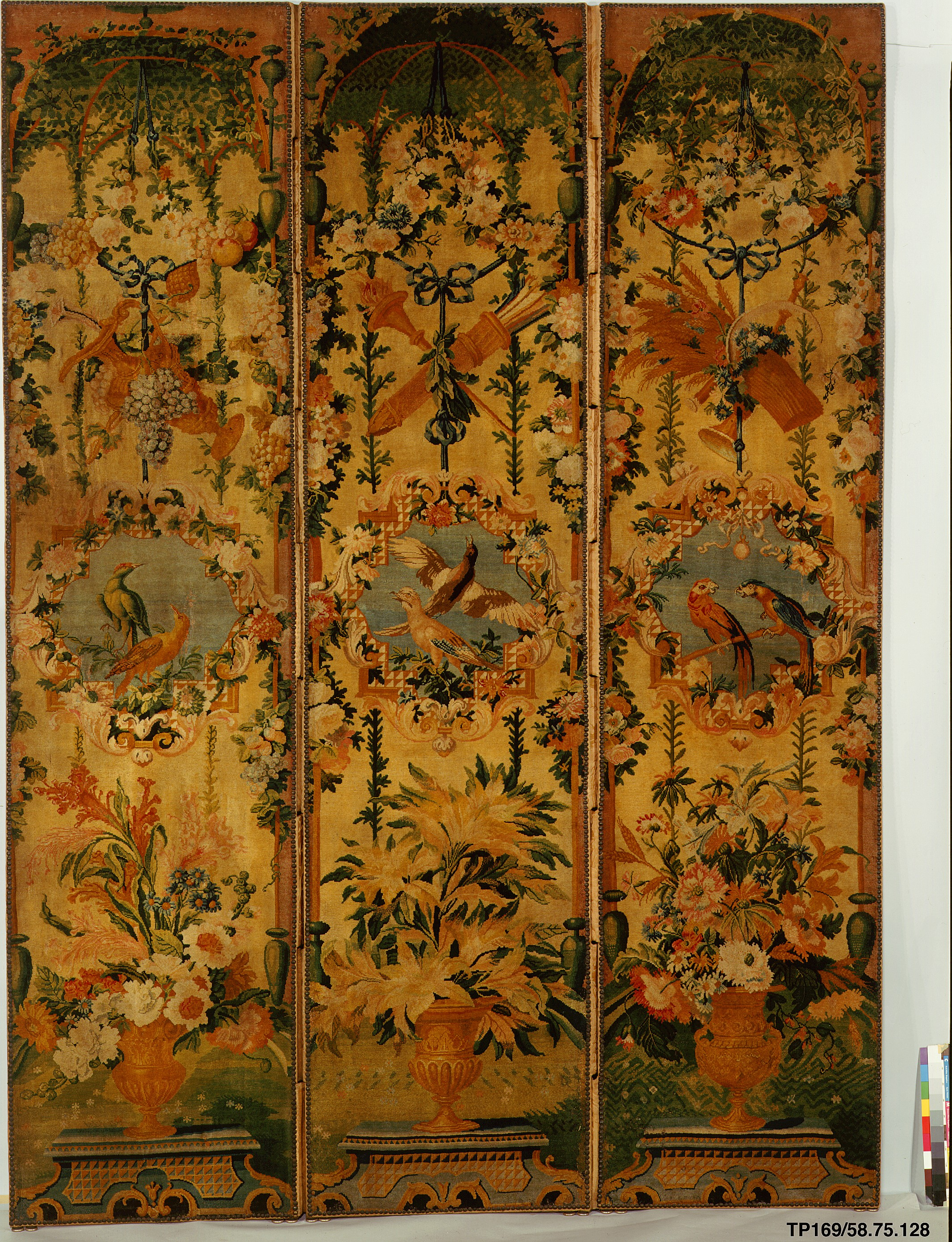
Trophies and birds patterned carpet at the Metropolitan Museum in New York

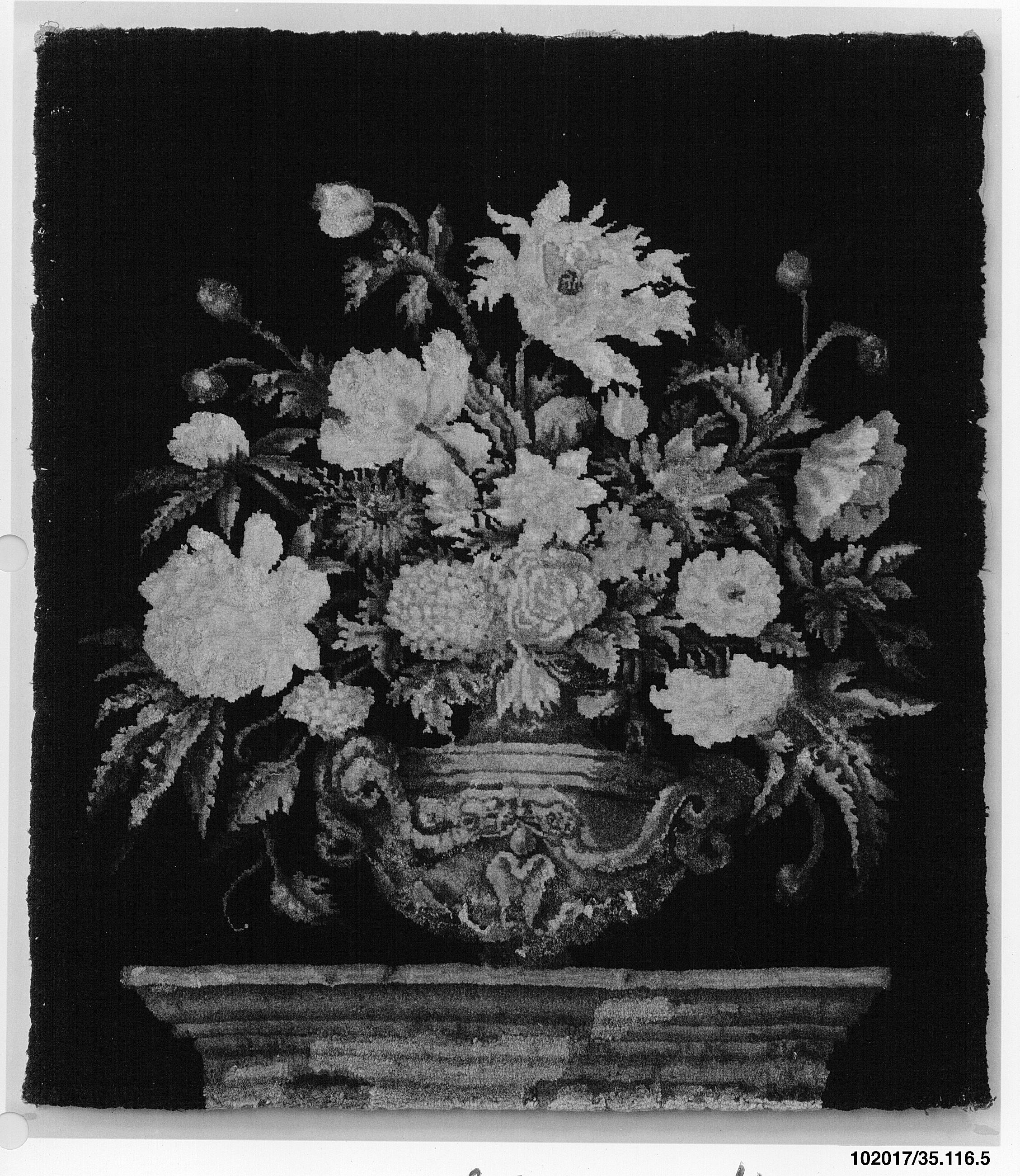
Depiction of flowers in a silver vase at the Metropolitan Museum in New York

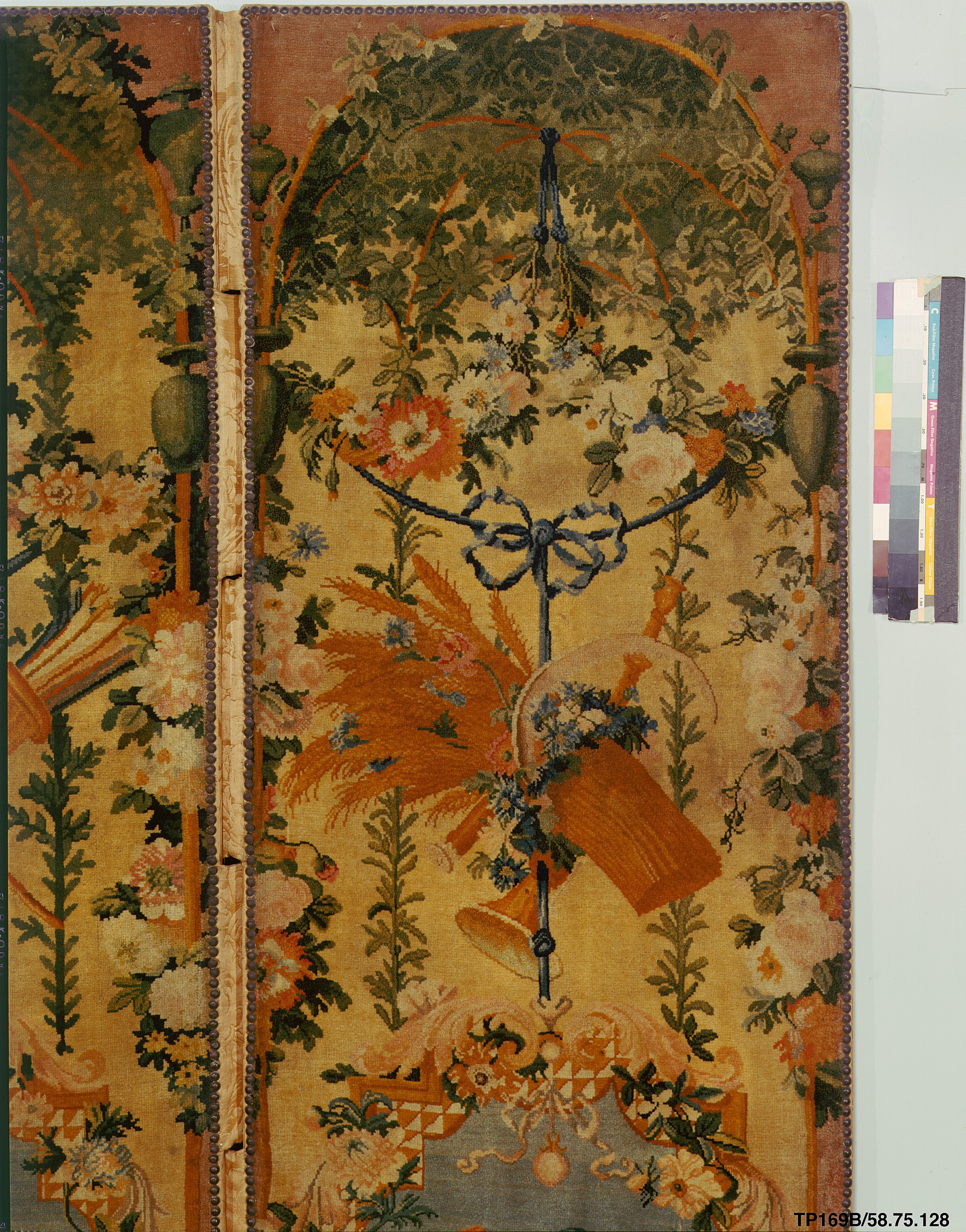
Trophies and birds Savonnerie at the Metropolitan Museum in New York

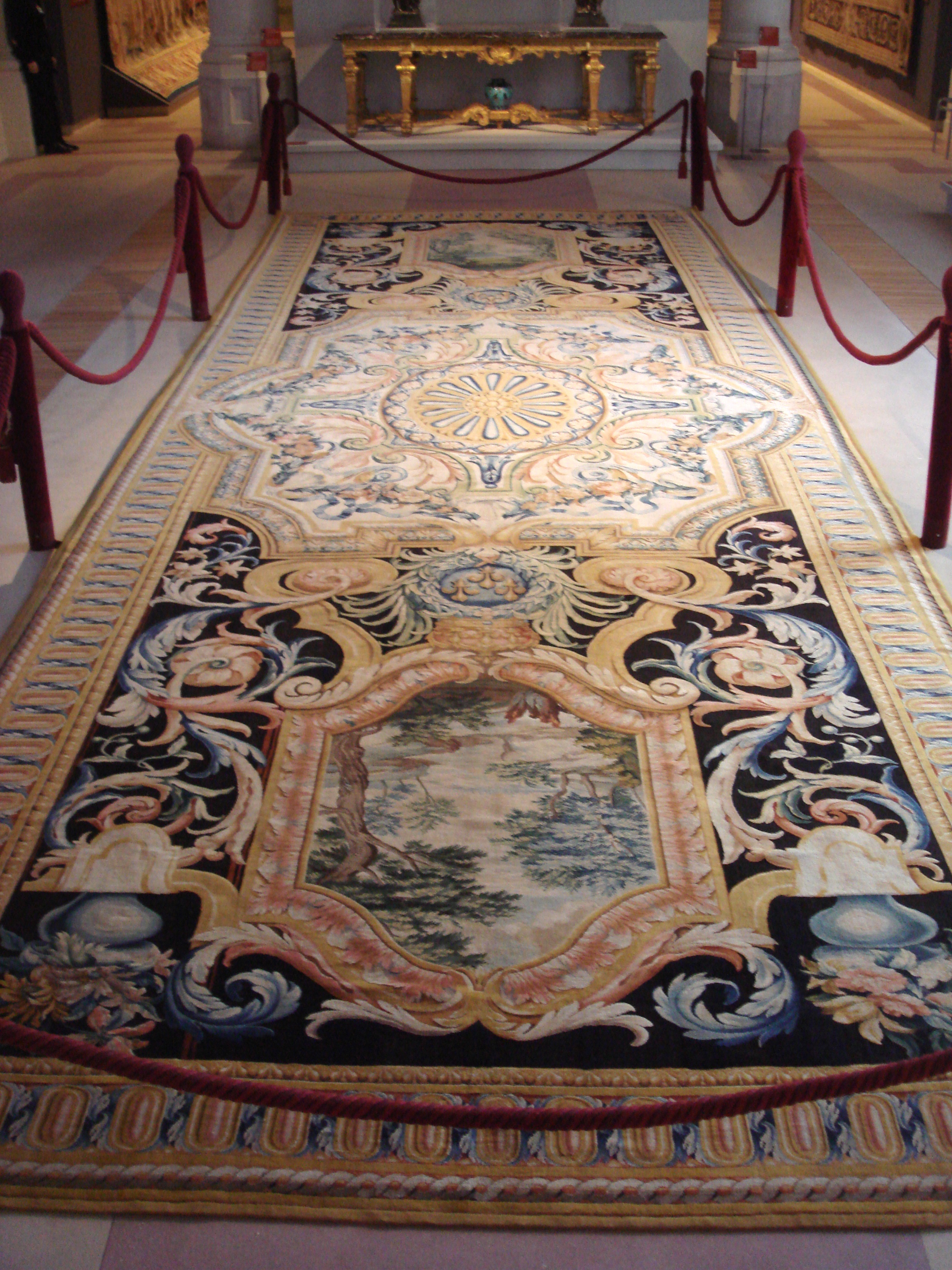
Grande Gallerie du Louvre carpet, No69, made in the Savonnerie between 1670 and 1685. On display at the Gobelins Manufactory.

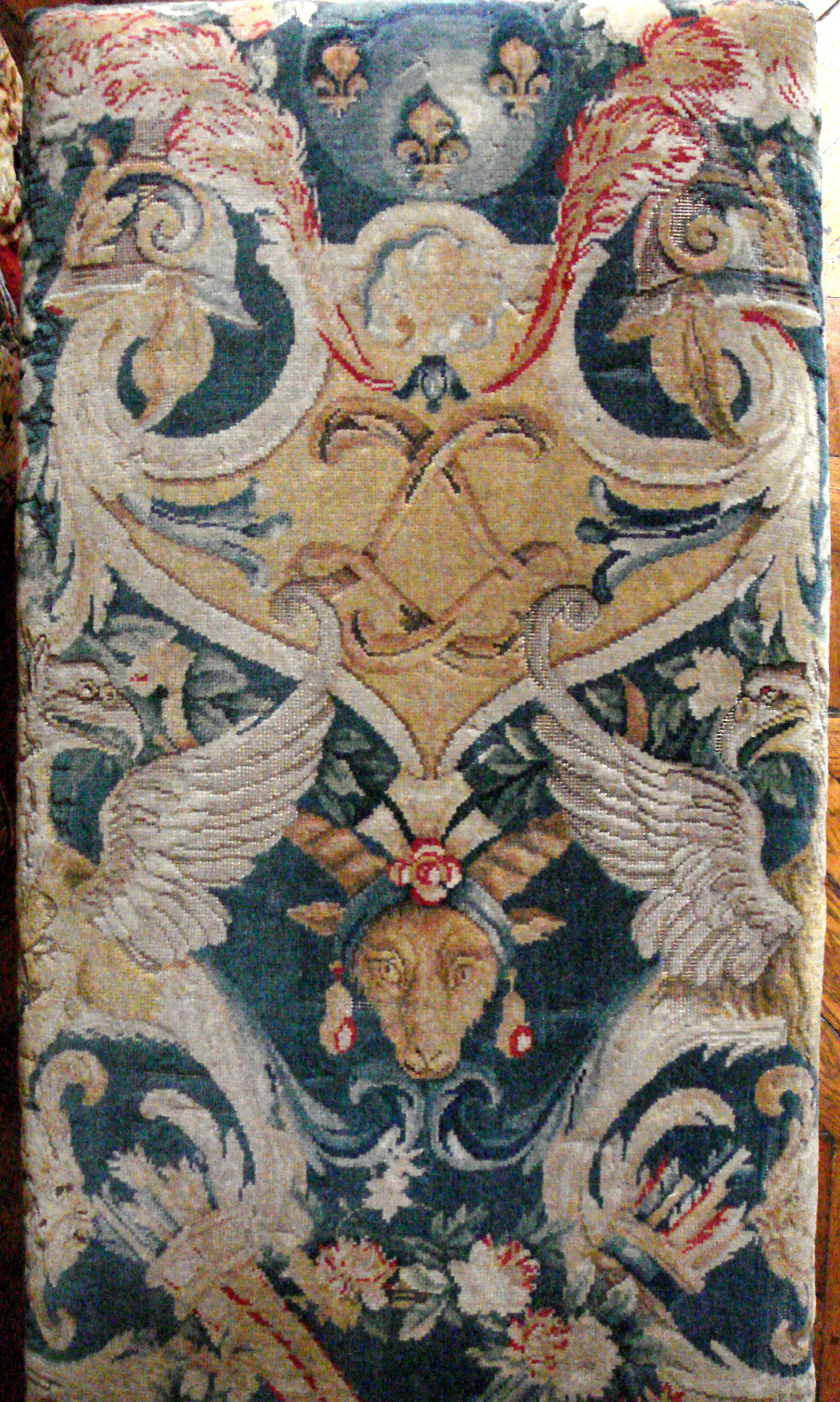
Savonnerie tapisserie, 18th century. Versailles

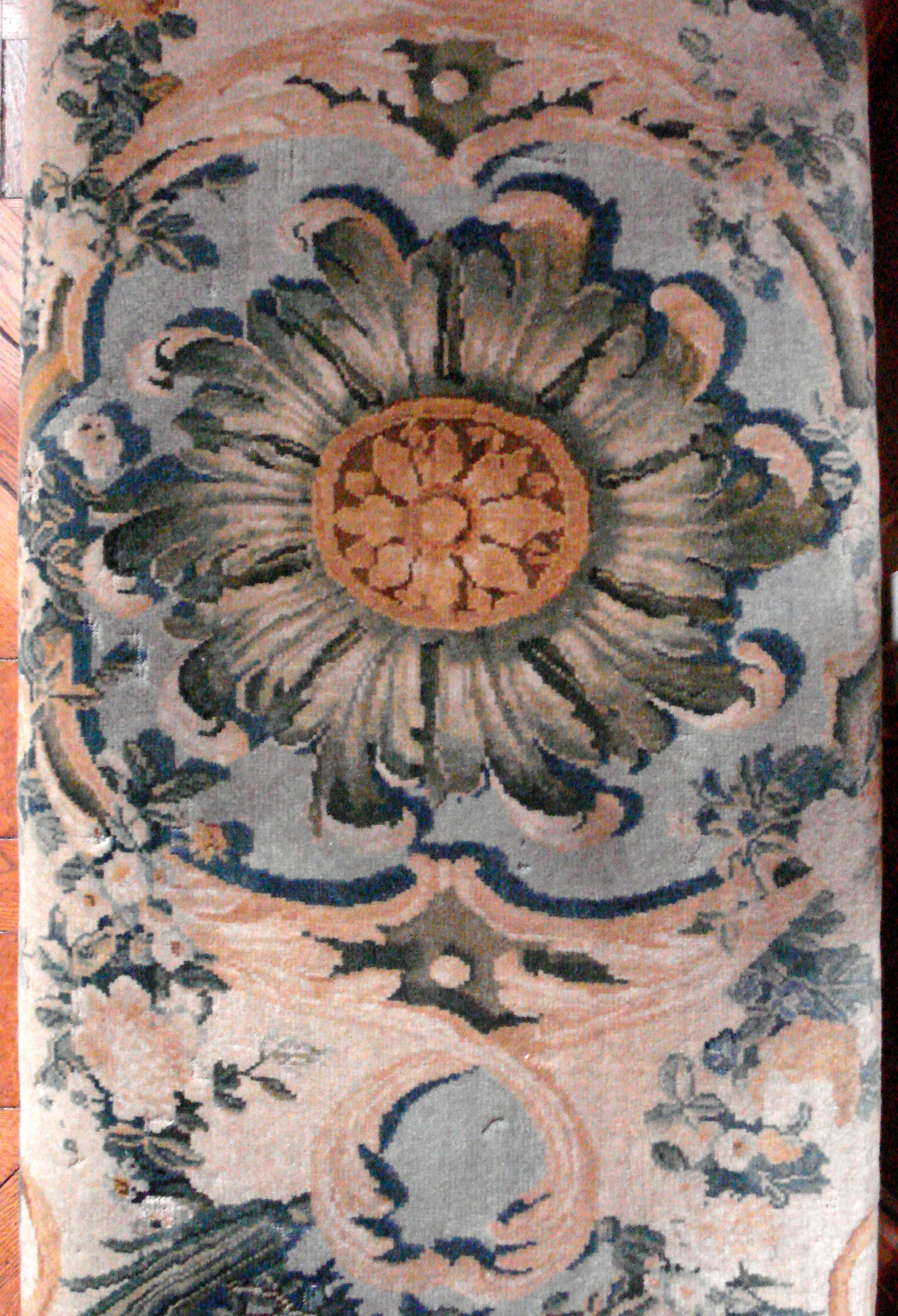
Savonnerie tapisserie, 18th century. Versailles

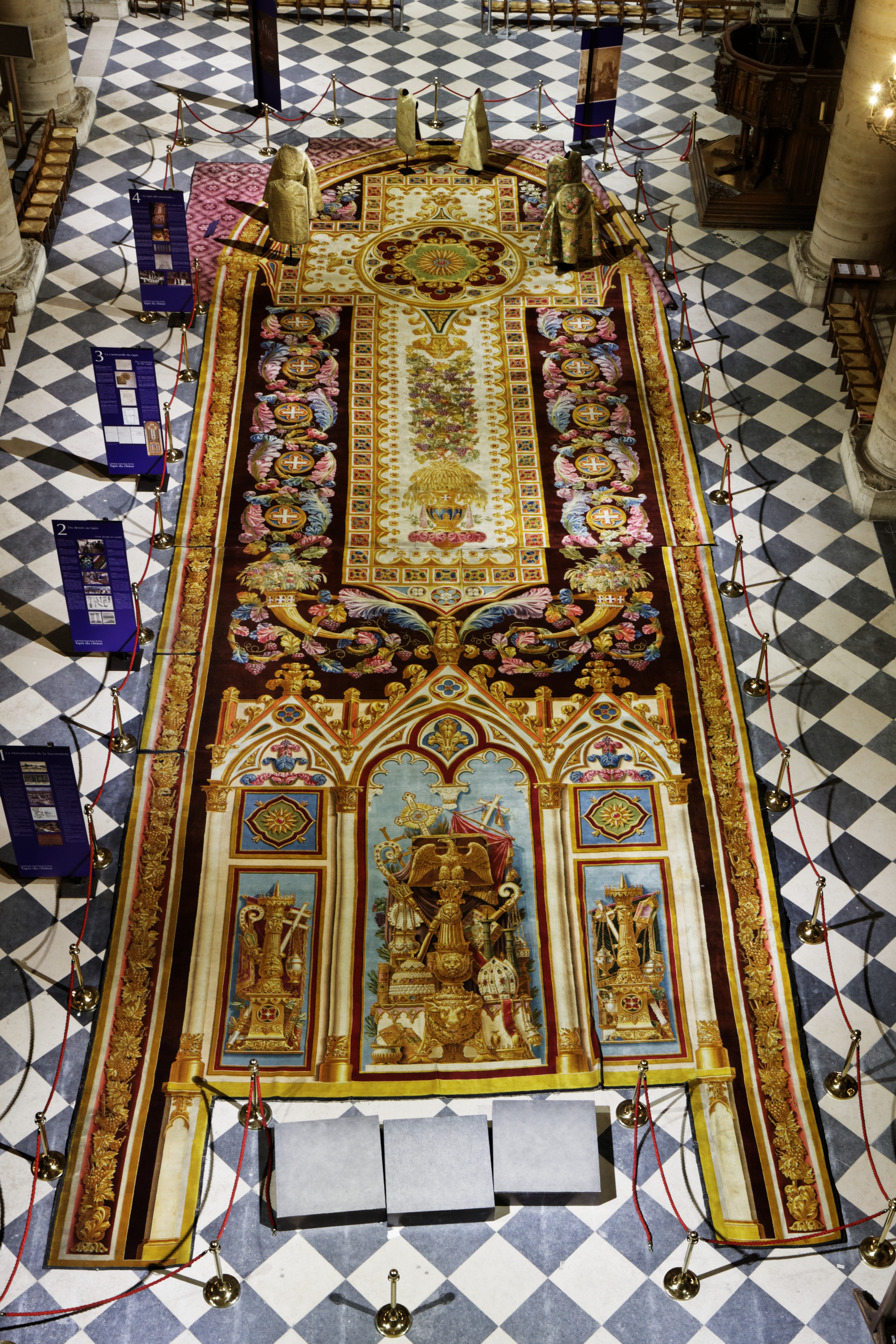
One of the biggest Savonnerie carpets, 19th century, Notre-Dame de Paris cathedrale, designed by Saint-Ange

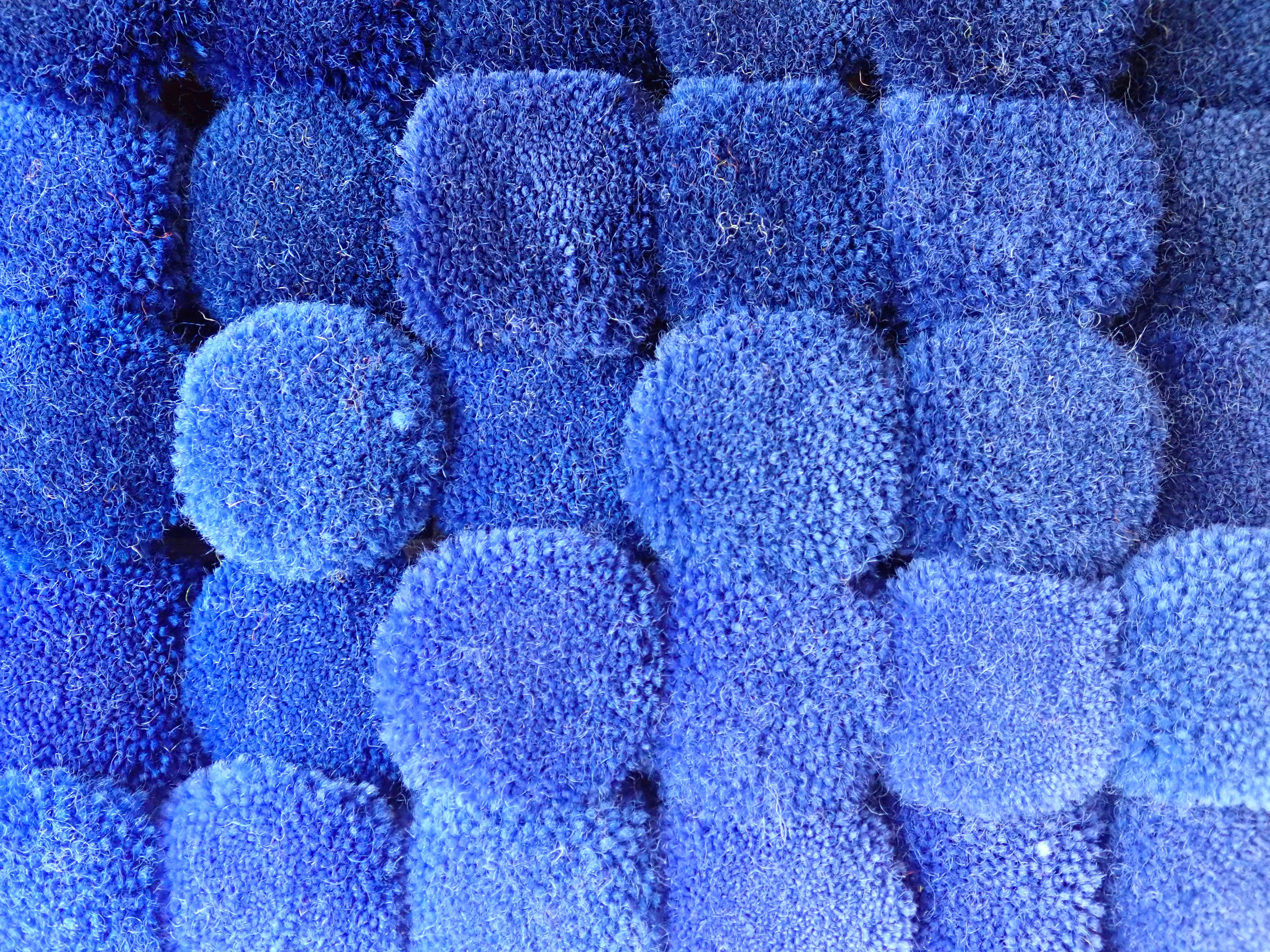
samples of Colors in the manufactory

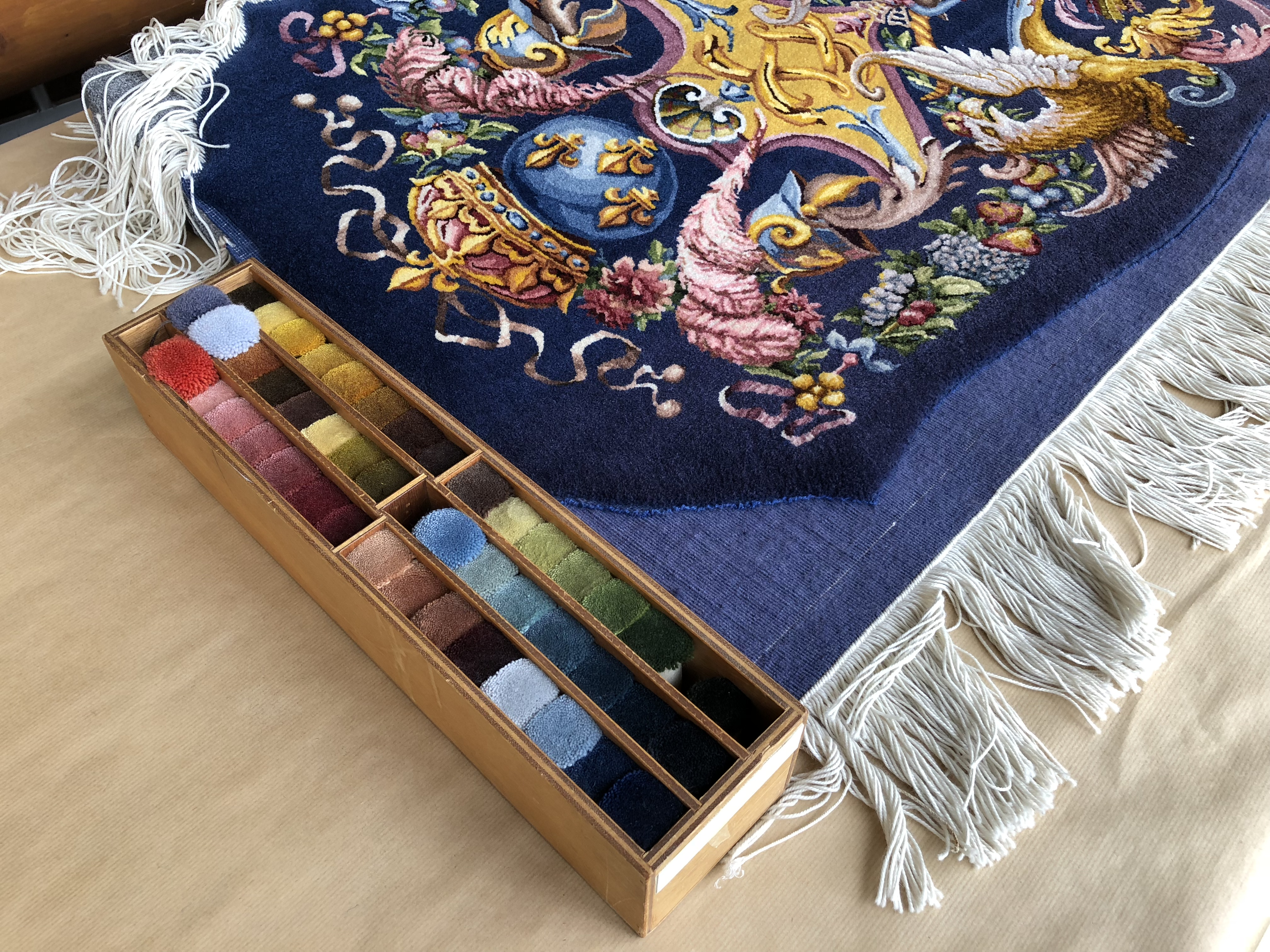
Selection of colors for the carpet with the model nowadays

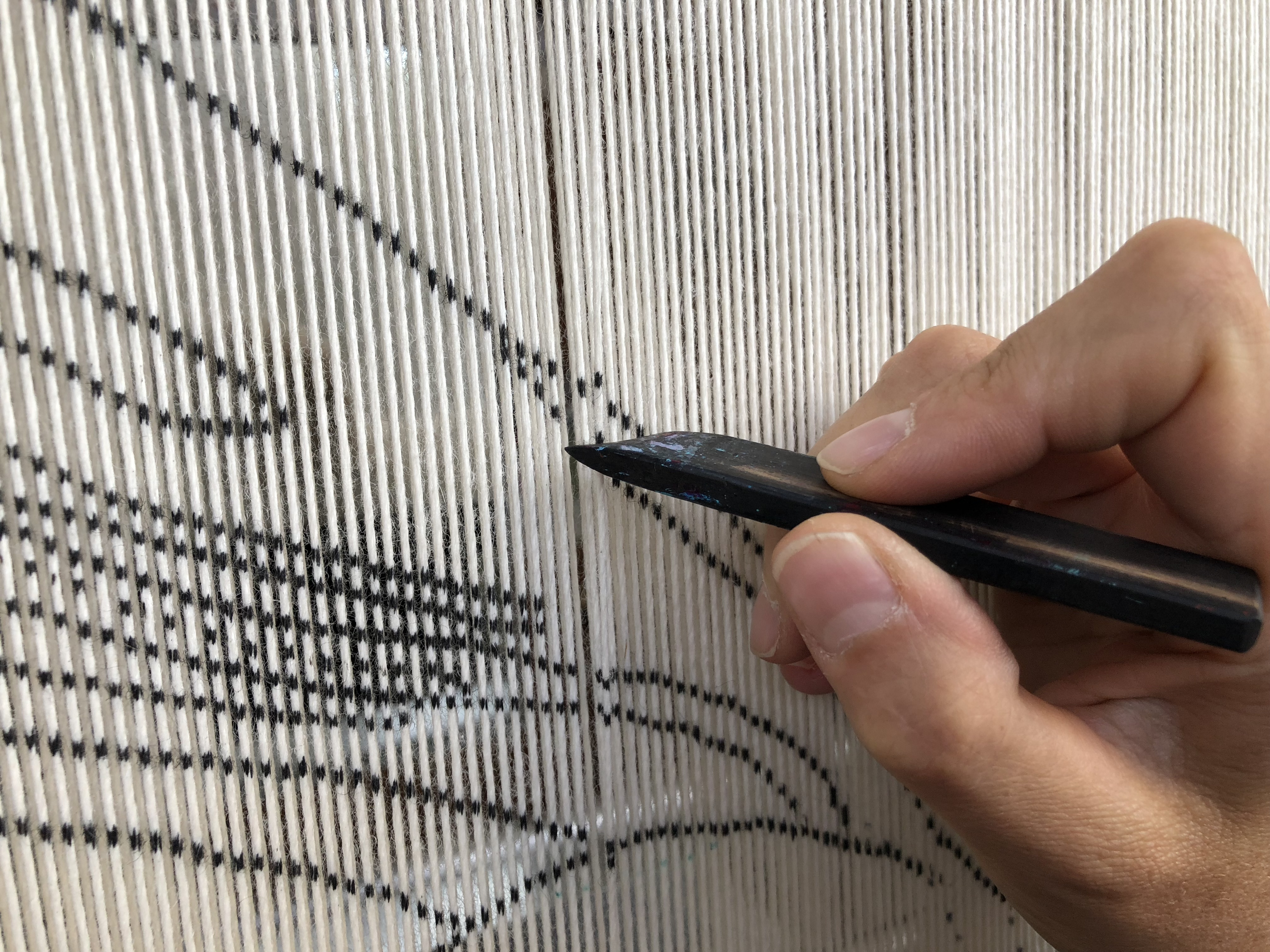
Design in 2018.

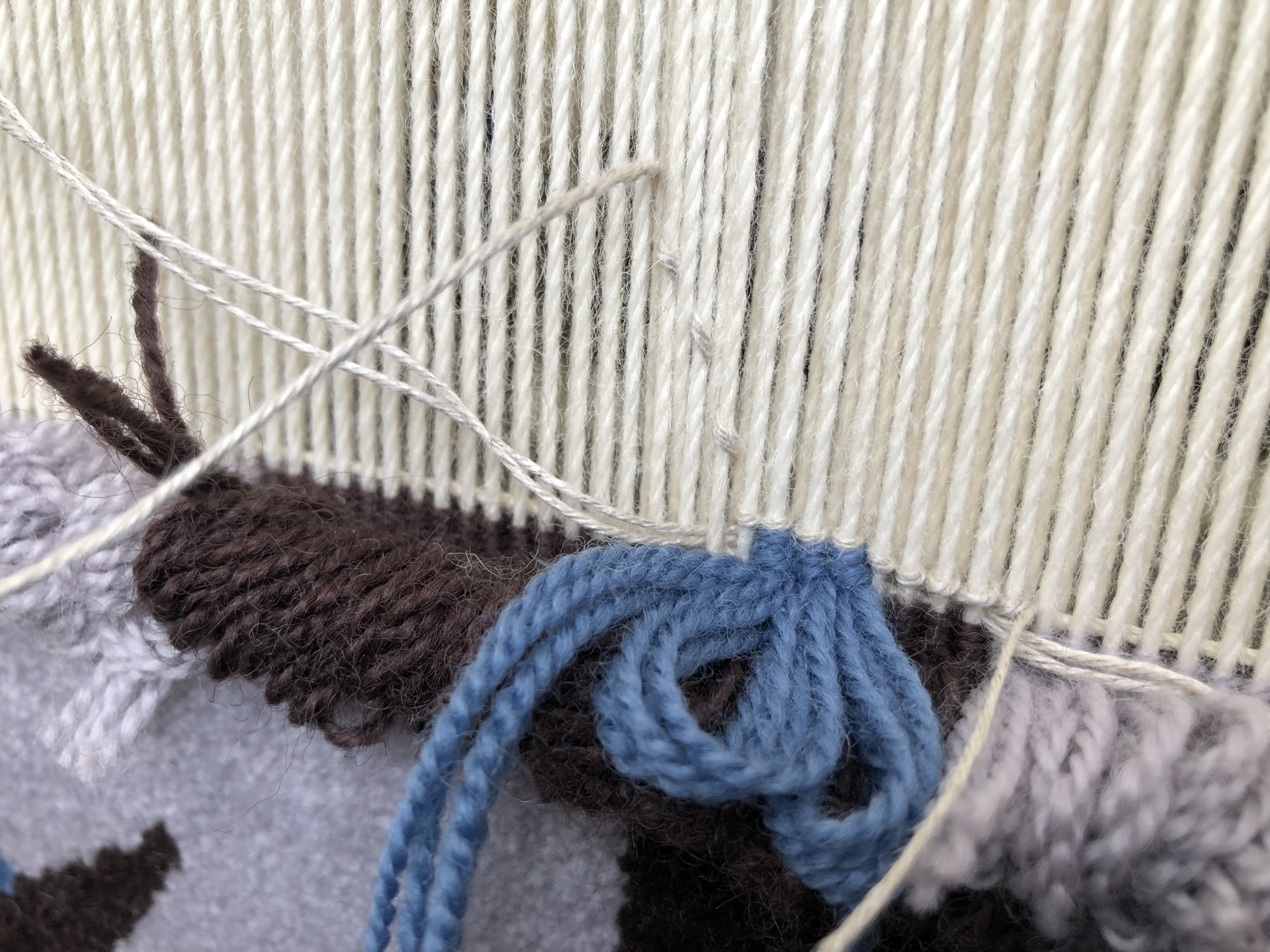
Technique of the Savonnerie in 2018

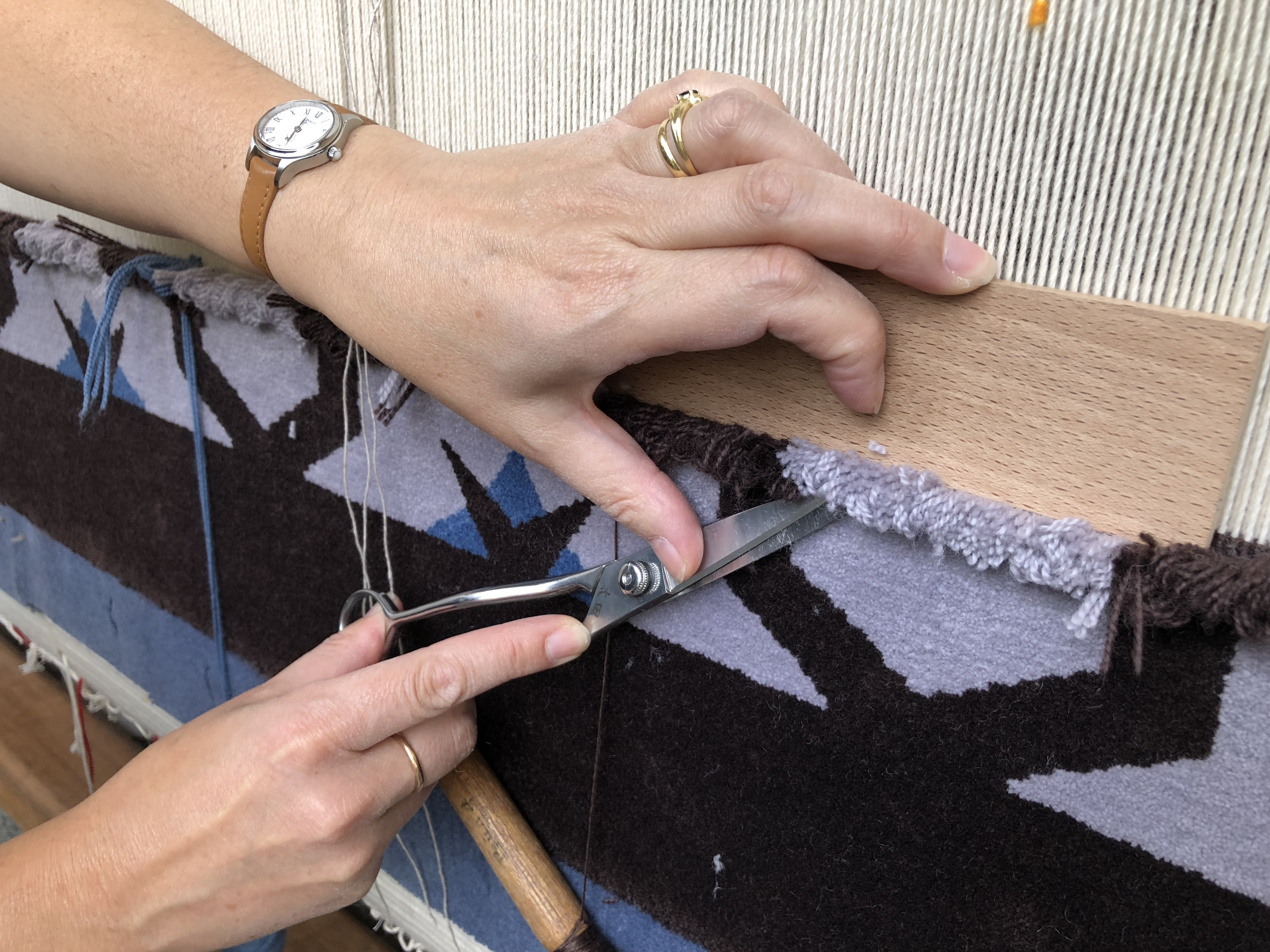
Technique of the Savonnerie in 2018

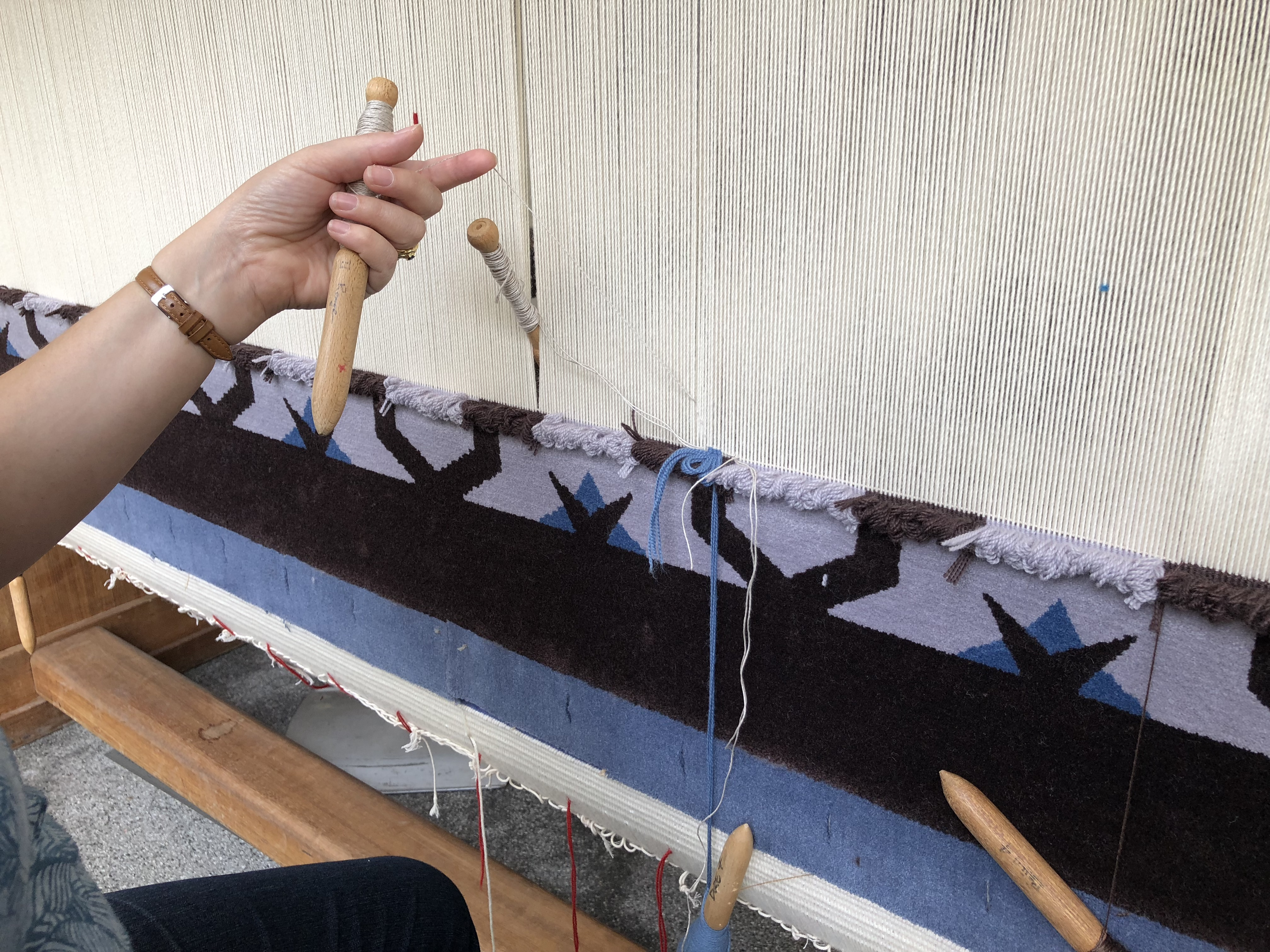
Technique of the Savonnerie in 2018

== See also ==
- Franco-Ottoman alliance
- Oriental carpets in Renaissance painting
- Savonnerie carpet collection at the Mobilier national (Paris, France)
- Savonnerie carpet collection at Waddesdon Manor
