= 1546 in France =

- Decades: 1520s; 1530s; 1540s; 1550s; 1560s
- See also: History of France; Timeline of French history; List of years in France

Events from the year 1546 in France.

== Incumbents ==
- Monarch – Francis I

== Events ==
End of the Sieges of Boulogne (1544–1546)

== Births ==
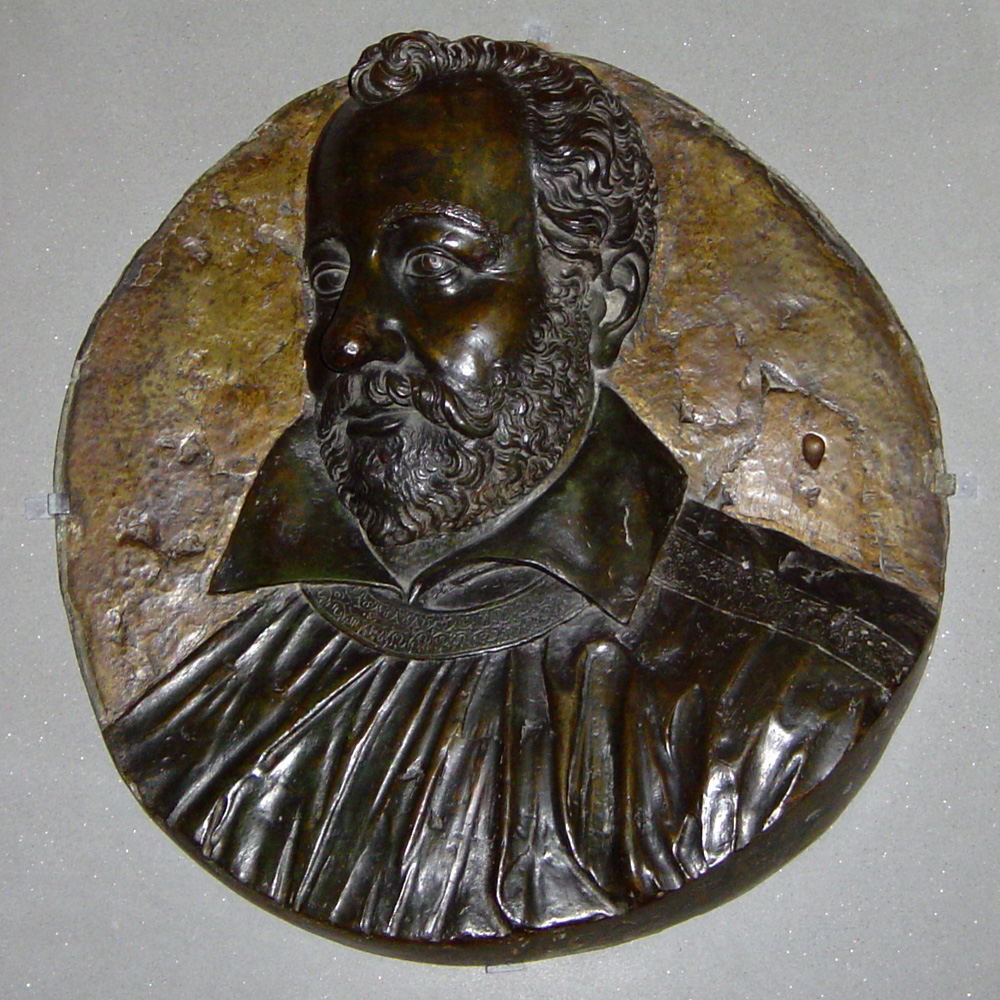
Philippe Desportes

- March 29 - Anne d'Escars de Givry, clergyman (d.1612)

=== Full date missing ===
- Philippe Desportes, poet (d.1606)
- Pierre de L'Estoile, diarist and collector (d.1611)
- Nicolas de Harlay, seigneur de Sancy, soldier and diplomat (d.1629)
- Pierre de La Primaudaye, writer (d.1619)
- Jacques Le Bossu, theologian (d.1626)
- Madeleine de l’Aubespine, aristocrat and writer (d.1596)

== Deaths ==
- February 23 -Francis, Count of Enghien (b.1519 )
- August 1 - Peter Faber, French Catholic priest and co-founder of the Society of Jesus (b.1506)
- August 3 (executed) - Étienne Dolet, scholar, translator and printer (b.1509)
