= 1544 in France =

- Decades: 1520s; 1530s; 1540s; 1550s; 1560s
- See also: History of France; Timeline of French history; List of years in France

Events from the year 1544 in France.

== Incumbents ==
- Monarch – Francis I

== Events ==
- April 11– Battle of Ceresole
- 2 to 4 June – Battle of Serravalle
- July - August; siege of St. Dizier, during the Italian War of 1542–46.
- September 18 - The Treaty of Crépy is signed between representatives of King Francis I and Holy Roman Emperor Charles V.

== Births ==
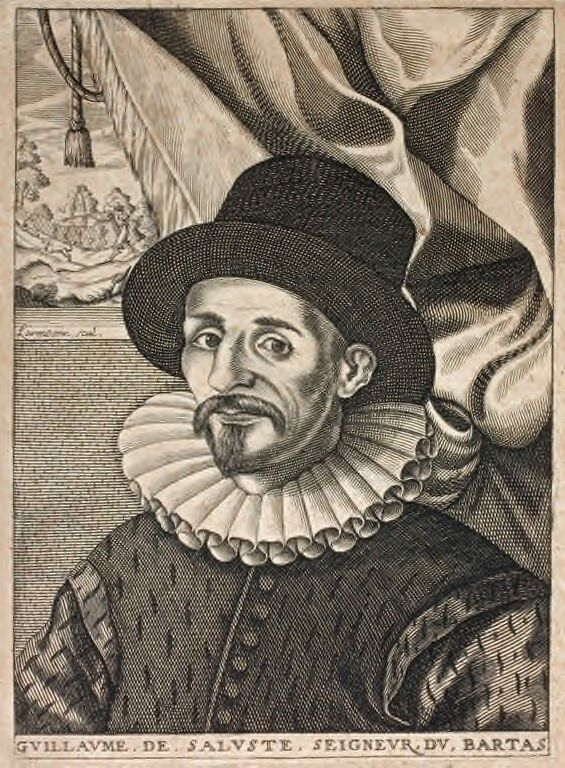
Guillaume de Salluste Du Bartas

- January 19 - Francis II of France, King of France and Scotland (by marriage) from 1559 to 1560.(d.1560)

=== Full date missing ===
- Guillaume de Salluste Du Bartas, poet (d.1590).

== Deaths ==
June 14 – Antoine, Duke of Lorraine, French aristocrat and general(b.1489).

=== Full date missing ===
- Clément Marot, poet (b. 1496)
- Charles du Dros, governor
- Bonaventure des Périers, writer (b. c.1510)
- Pierre Chambiges, mason and architect
- René of Châlon, Prince of Orange and stadtholder in the Low Countries
