= Pierre Tarisel =

French master-mason

- Born: c. 1442
- Died: August 1510
- Occupation: Master mason
- Known for: Amiens Cathedral

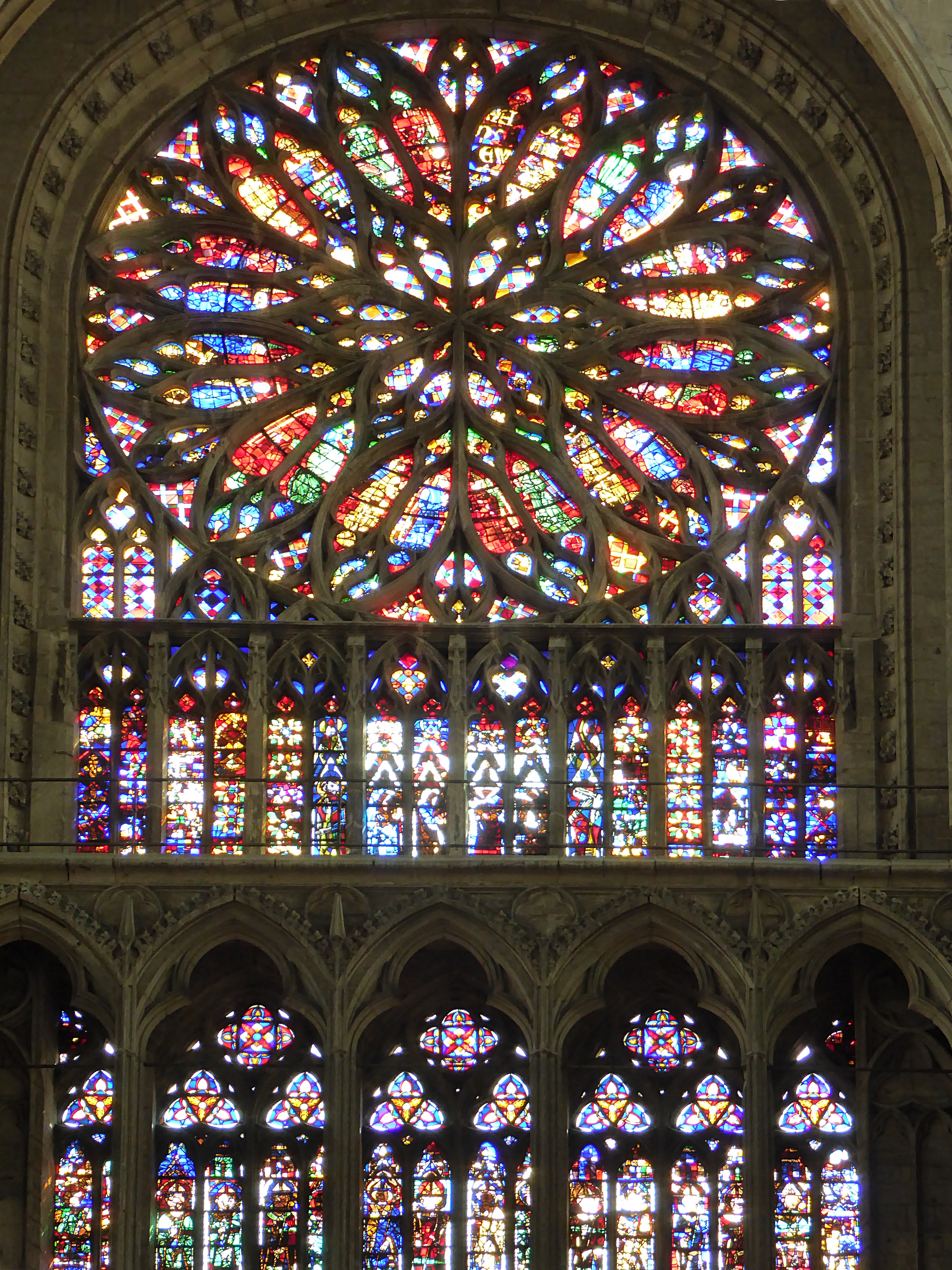
Rose windows of Amiens Cathedral by Pierre Tarisel

Pierre Tarisel (c. 1442 – August 1510) was the Master-mason to the King of France, known for working on Amiens Cathedral.

== Career ==
In 1475 Tarisel was summoned to inspect Noyon Cathedral, which was deteriorating in many places. Although he was not yet master mason of the city, no work of importance was undertaken without him. In 1477 he was in Arras, at work for the King of France. In 1500 the plan of Martin Chambiges for the restoration and decoration of Beauvais Cathedral was submitted to him. On 4 November 1483, on the death of Guillaume Postel, Tarisel was appointed master mason of the city of Amiens. His predecessors had been paid at the rate of 4s. per day; Tarisel received 5s. The rate was again reduced to 4s. for his successor, which may show with what esteem his talent was regarded.

== Amiens Cathedral ==
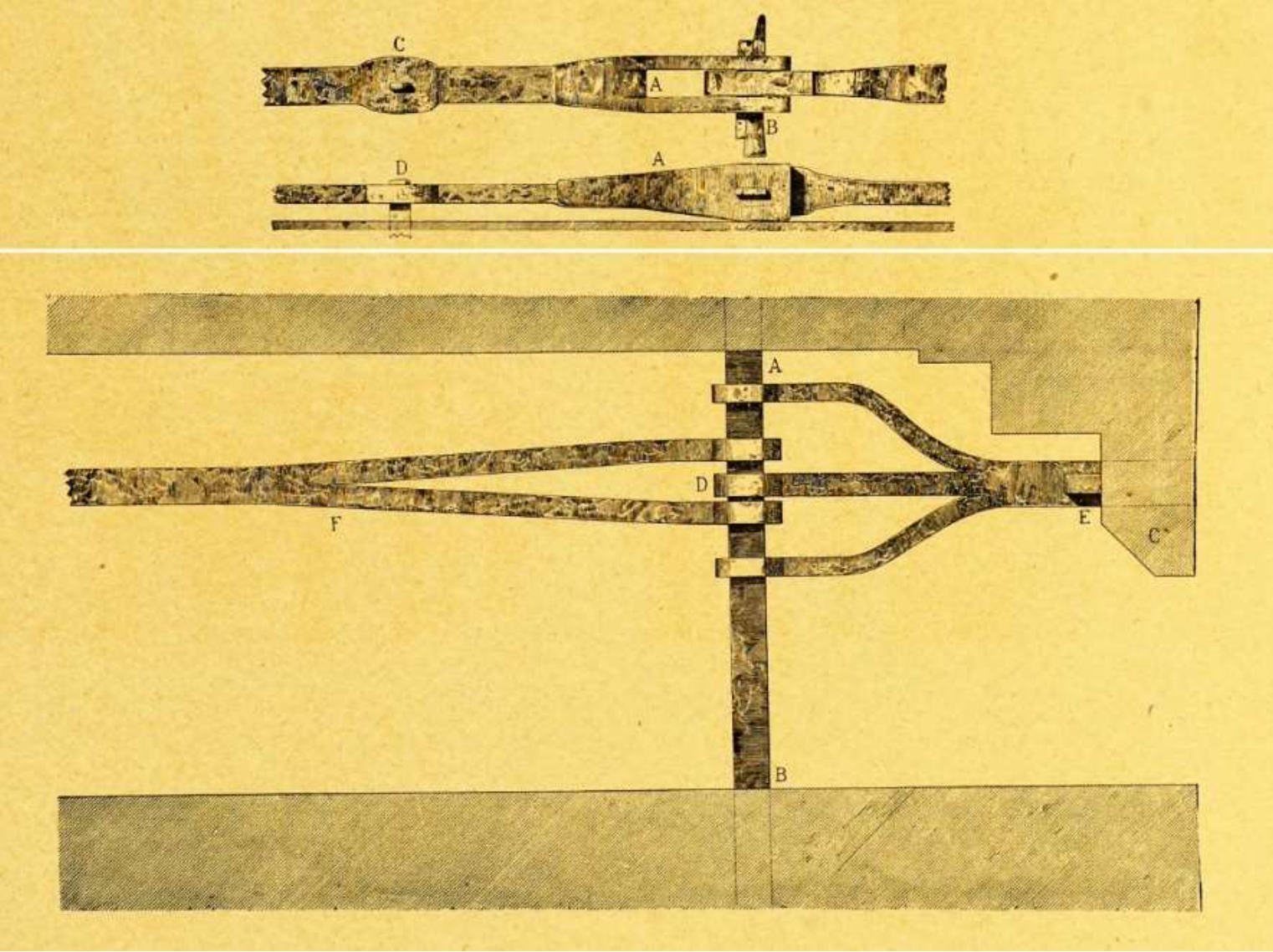
Diagram of Tarisel's iron supports for crumbling pillars in Amiens Cathedral

There is no document that shows what year Tarisel became master mason of Amiens Cathedral; but it seems certain beyond doubt that he fulfilled these duties in 1482–1483. On 7 March 1497, he visited all the cloistered houses subject to the cathedral chapter. Shortly afterwards he undertook the task of restoring the cathedral. The second pillar of the choir, on the left, threatened to fall, but under Tarisel's direction it was restored in 1497. The projecting arch and the arches near it were restored, and the outer wall was propped by an additional flying buttress. In 1503 the same was done for the remaining pillars.

Between 1497 and 1503 the pillars of the transept buckled, owing to the weight of the rear side arches, and cracks formed. The remedy was found in bands of Spanish iron, sunk six to eight inches deep in the pillars and reaching from the transept to the ends of the choir, the nave, and the cross bars. Tarisel's great iron chainwork, upholding the four large pillars of the transept and running the length of the triforium in four directions, still exists.
