= 1543 in France =

- Decades: 1520s; 1530s; 1540s; 1550s; 1560s
- See also: History of France; Timeline of French history; List of years in France

Events from the year 1543 in France.

== Incumbents ==
- Monarch – Francis I

== Events ==
- Siege of Landrecies May 1543 - November 1543
- Siege of Nice 6–22 August 1543

== Births ==
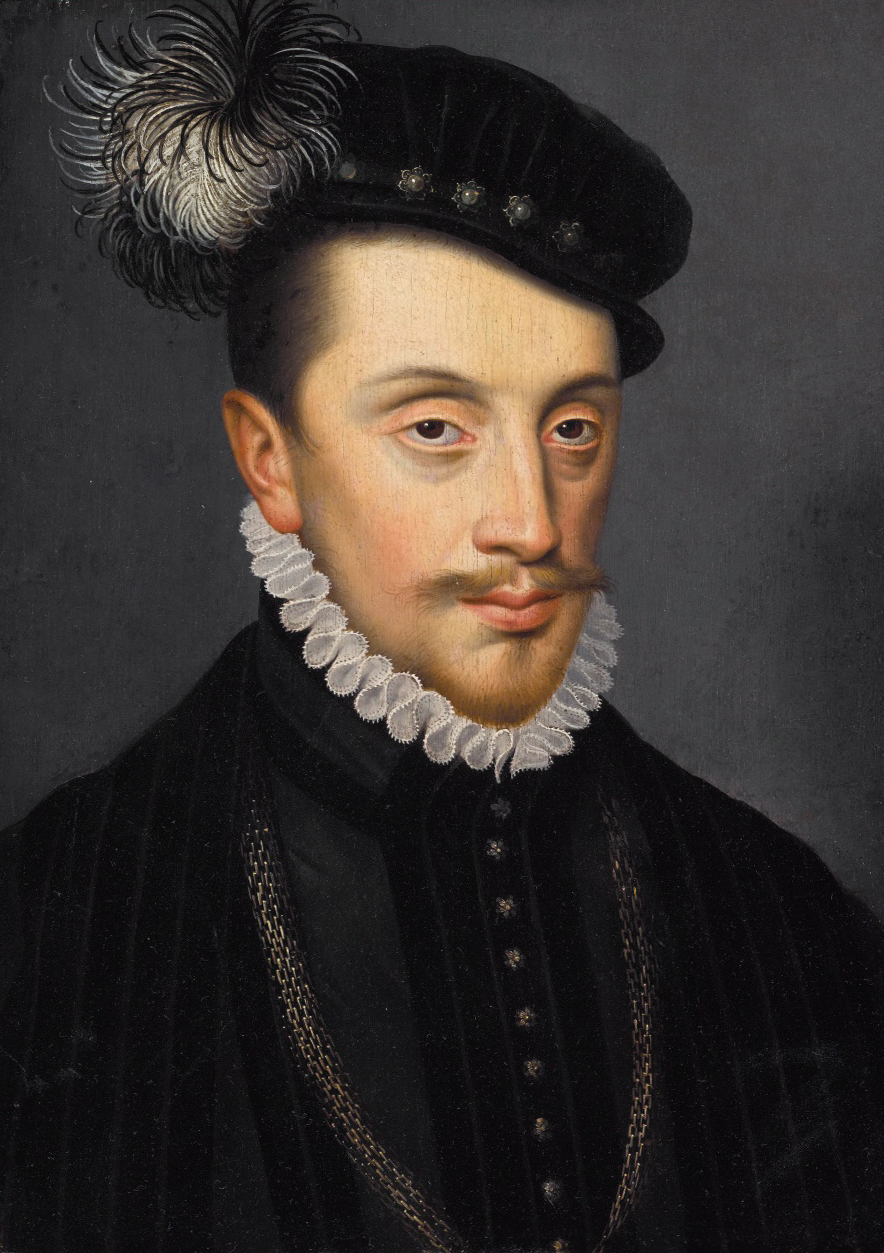
Charles III, Duke of Lorraine

- 18 February – Charles III, Duke of Lorraine (died 1608).

=== Full date missing ===
- Louis Bellaud, writer (died 1588)
- François de Bonne, Duke of Lesdiguières, military officer (died 1626)
- Nicolas de Neufville, seigneur de Villeroy, secretary of state (died 1617)

== Deaths ==
=== Full date missing ===
- Jean Le Veneur, Roman Catholic cardinal, died 7 or 8 August 1543.
- Philippe de Chabot, admiral (born c.1492)
