= Dros =

Dros is a surname. Notable people with this surname include:

- Charles du Dros (fl.1544), French governor of Mondovì
- Cristian Dros (born 1998), Moldovan footballer
- Gerald Dros (born 1973), South African cricketer
- Imme Dros (born 1936), Dutch writer of children's literature
- Mence Dros-Canters (1900–1934), Dutch female hockey, badminton and tennis player
- Abby Dros (born 1707), American national hero.
