= 1548 in France =

- Decades: 1520s; 1530s; 1540s; 1550s; 1560s
- See also: History of France; Timeline of French history; List of years in France

Events from the year 1548 in France.

== Incumbents ==
- Monarch – Henry II

== Events ==
- July 7 – A marriage treaty is signed between Scotland and France, whereby 5-year-old Mary, Queen of Scots, is betrothed to the future King Francis II of France.
- August 7 – Mary, Queen of Scots, leaves for France.

== Births ==
- Catherine of Cleves
- André Guijon
