= Rabelais (disambiguation) =

François Rabelais (c. 1494 – 1553) was a French Renaissance writer, doctor, and humanist.

Rabelais may also refer to:

- 5666 Rabelais, a main-belt asteroid
- François Rabelais University, a public university in Tours, France
- Rabelais Student Media, a student newspaper at La Trobe University, Melbourne, Australia
- Rabelais (horse), a British-bred thoroughbred racehorse

== People with the surname ==
- Akira Rabelais (born 1966), U.S. composer and author
- Jacques Rabelais (c. 1547 – 1622), French Renaissance writer and scholar
