= 1552 in France =

- Decades: 1530s; 1540s; 1550s; 1560s; 1570s
- See also: History of France; Timeline of French history; List of years in France

Events from the year 1552 in France.

== Incumbents ==
- Monarch – Henry II

== Events ==
- 15 January – Signing of the Treaty of Chambord
- Cour des monnaies is established
- October 1552 to January 1553 – Siege of Metz

== Births ==
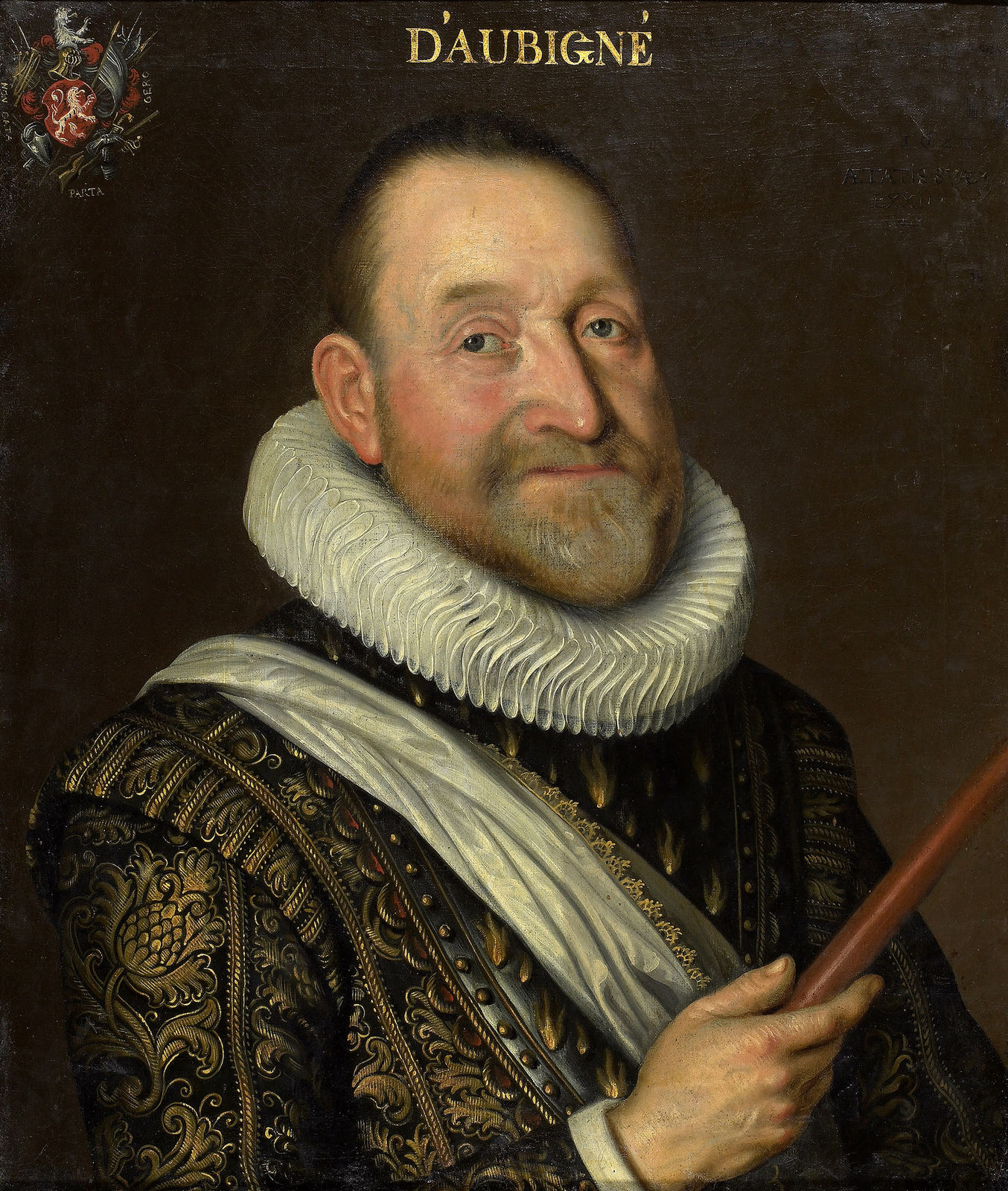
Agrippa d'Aubigné

- 8 February – Agrippa d'Aubigné, poet, soldier, propagandist and chronicler (d. 1630)
- 23 October – Odet de Turnèbe, dramatist (d. 1581)

=== Full date missing ===
- Jean Bertaut, poet (d. 1611)
- Charles David, architect (d. 1650)
- François Grudé, writer and bibliographer
- Jean Hotman, Marquis de Villers-St-Paul, diplomat (d. 1636)
- Antoine de Pluvinel, riding master (d. 1620)

== Deaths ==
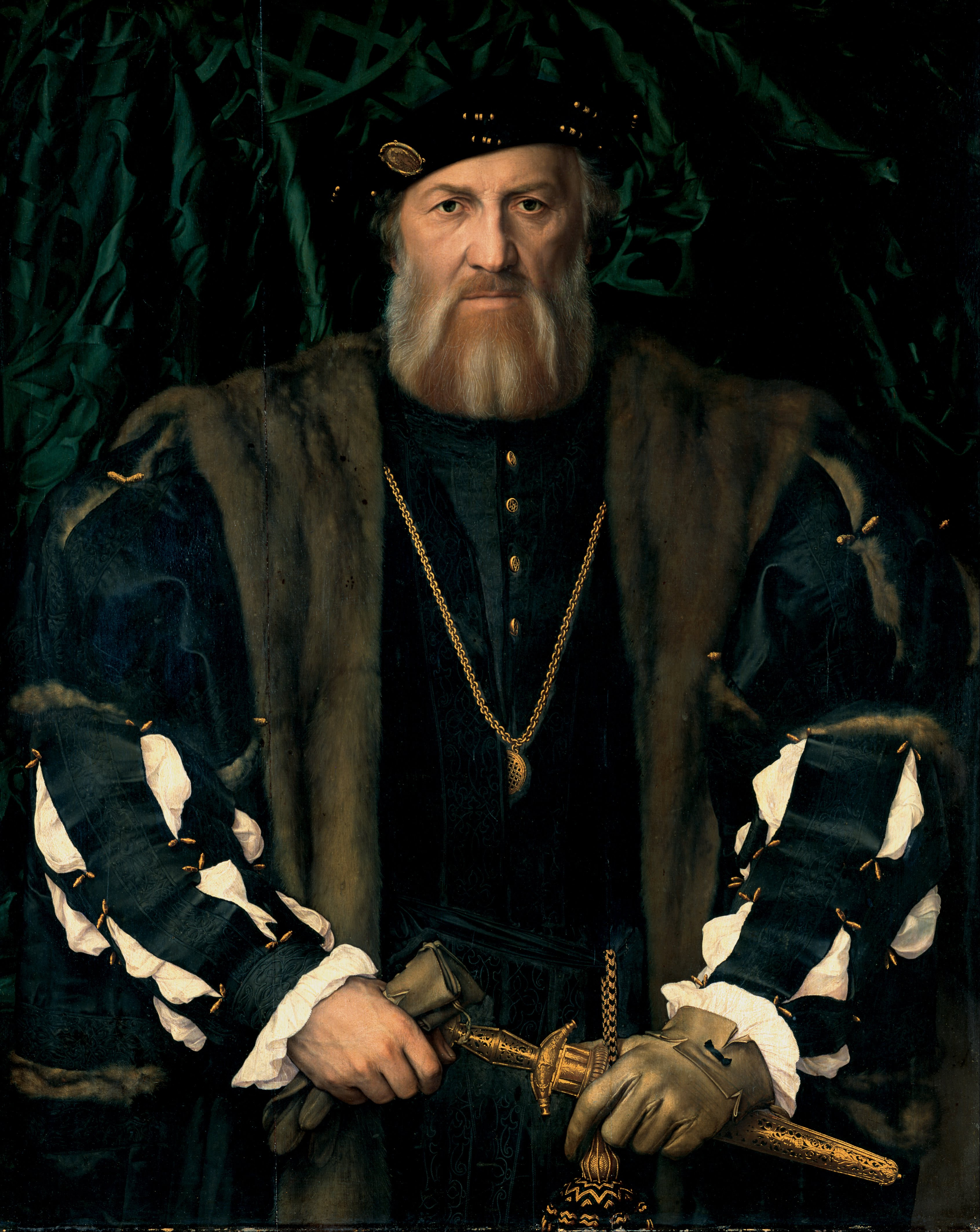
Charles de Solier, comte de Morette

- 8 January – Eustorg de Beaulieu, poet, composer and pastor (b. around 1495)
- 1 February – Charles de Solier, comte de Morette, soldier and diplomat (b. 1480)
- 2 December – Claude d'Annebault, military officer (b. 1495)

=== Full date missing ===
- Pierre du Chastel, humanist, librarian (born around 1480)
- René I, Viscount of Rohan (b. 1516)
