= 1553 in France =

- Decades: 1530s; 1540s; 1550s; 1560s; 1570s
- See also: History of France; Timeline of French history; List of years in France

Events from the year 1553 in France.

== Incumbents ==
- Monarch – Henry II

== Events ==
- Invasion of Corsica

== Births ==
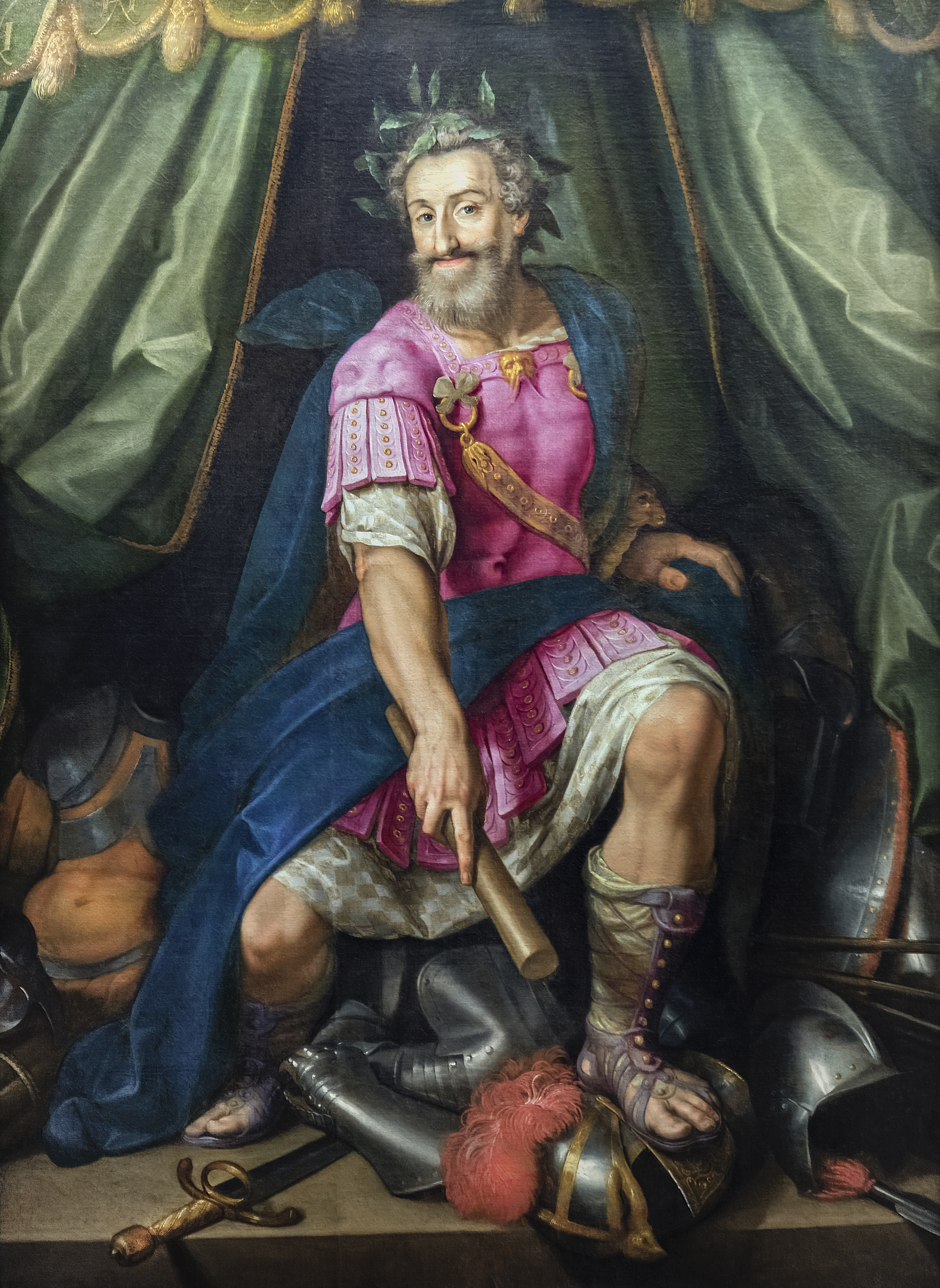
Henry IV, King of France 1589–1610

- December 13 – Henry IV of France (d.1610).
- May 14– Margaret of Valois, Queen of France (d.1615)

=== Full date missing ===
- Louise of Lorraine, queen consort (d.1601)
- Pierre de Lancre, judge, conducted a massive witch-hunt (d.1631)
- Jacques Auguste de Thou, historian (d.1617)

== Deaths ==
=== Full date missing ===
- Louise Borgia, Duchess of Valentinois, noblewoman (b.1500)
- François Rabelais, writer and humanist (b.1483 -1494)
- Gilles Le Breton, architect
- Gabriel de Luetz, Baron and Lord of Aramon and Vallabrègues, French Ambassador to the Ottoman Empire (b. 1508)
