= 1547 in France =

- Decades: 1520s; 1530s; 1540s; 1550s; 1560s
- See also: History of France; Timeline of French history; List of years in France

Events from the year 1547 in France.

== Incumbents ==
- Monarch – Francis I (until March 31), then Henry II

== Events ==
- 31 March – Francis I of France dies, and Henry II is the new King of France

== Births ==
- November 12 - Claude of Valois, Duchess of Lorraine, daughter of King Henry II of France and Catherine de' Medici (d.1575).

=== Full date missing ===
- Jacques Rabelais, writer and scholar (d.1622)

== Deaths ==
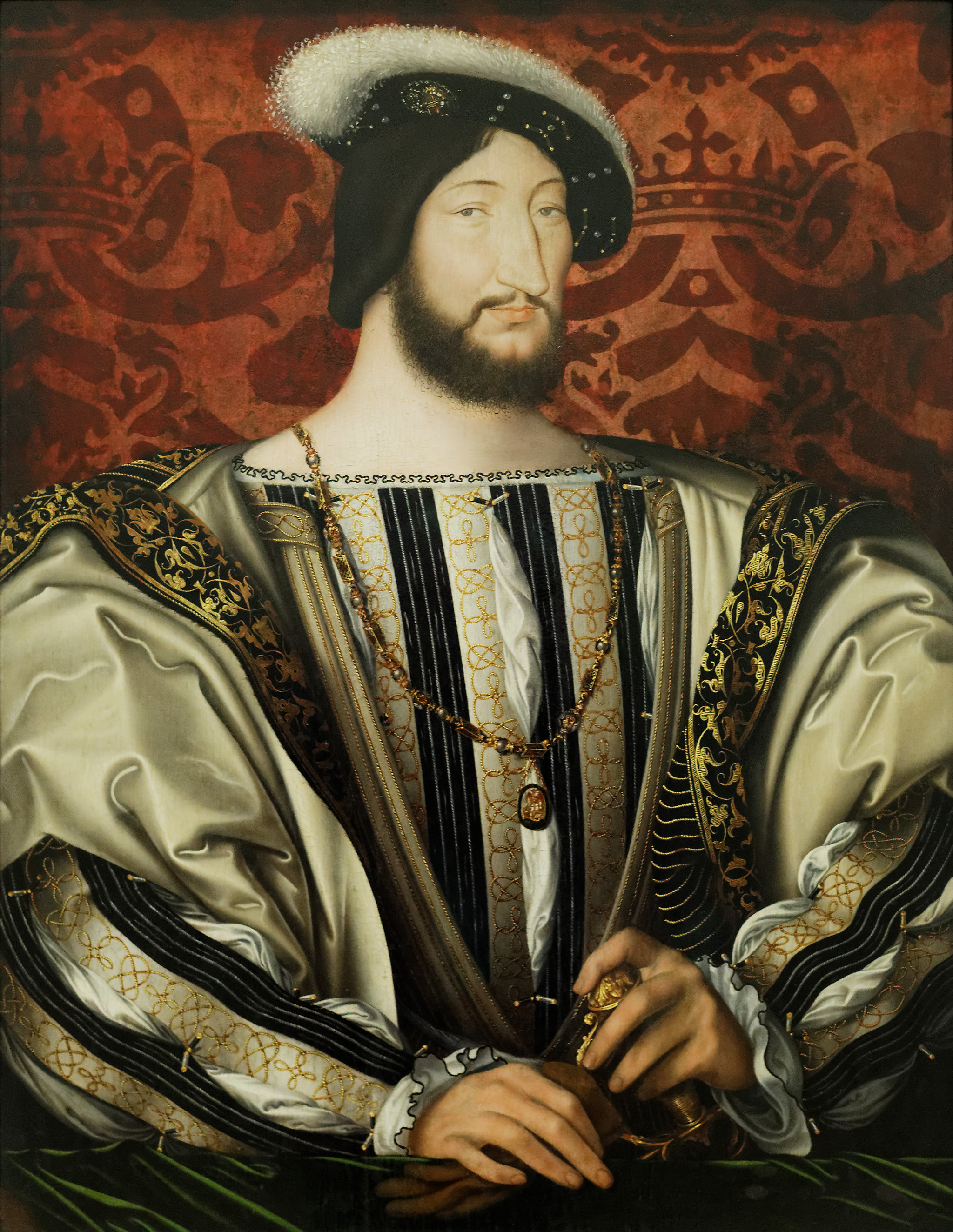
Francis I, King of France 1515–1547

- 31 March – King Francis I of France (b.1494)

=== Full date missing ===
- Louise de Montmorency, noblewoman (b.1496)
- Marie of Luxembourg, Countess of Vendôme, princess (b.1472)
- Lazare de Baïf, diplomat and humanist (b.1496)
- François Vatable, humanist scholar, Hellenist and Hebraist (b. Unknown)
- André de Foix, military officer (b.1490)
