= 1540 in France =

- Decades: 1520s; 1530s; 1540s; 1550s; 1560s
- See also: History of France; Timeline of French history; List of years in France

Events from the year 1540 in France.

== Incumbents ==
- Monarch – Francis I

== Events ==
- January 1 (New Year's Day) – Holy Roman Emperor Charles V, at the invitation of King Francis I, visits Paris for the first and only time and stays for two months.
- June 1 – The Edict of Fontainebleau is issued by King Francis I, branding Protestants as heretics and condemning them to death.

== Births ==
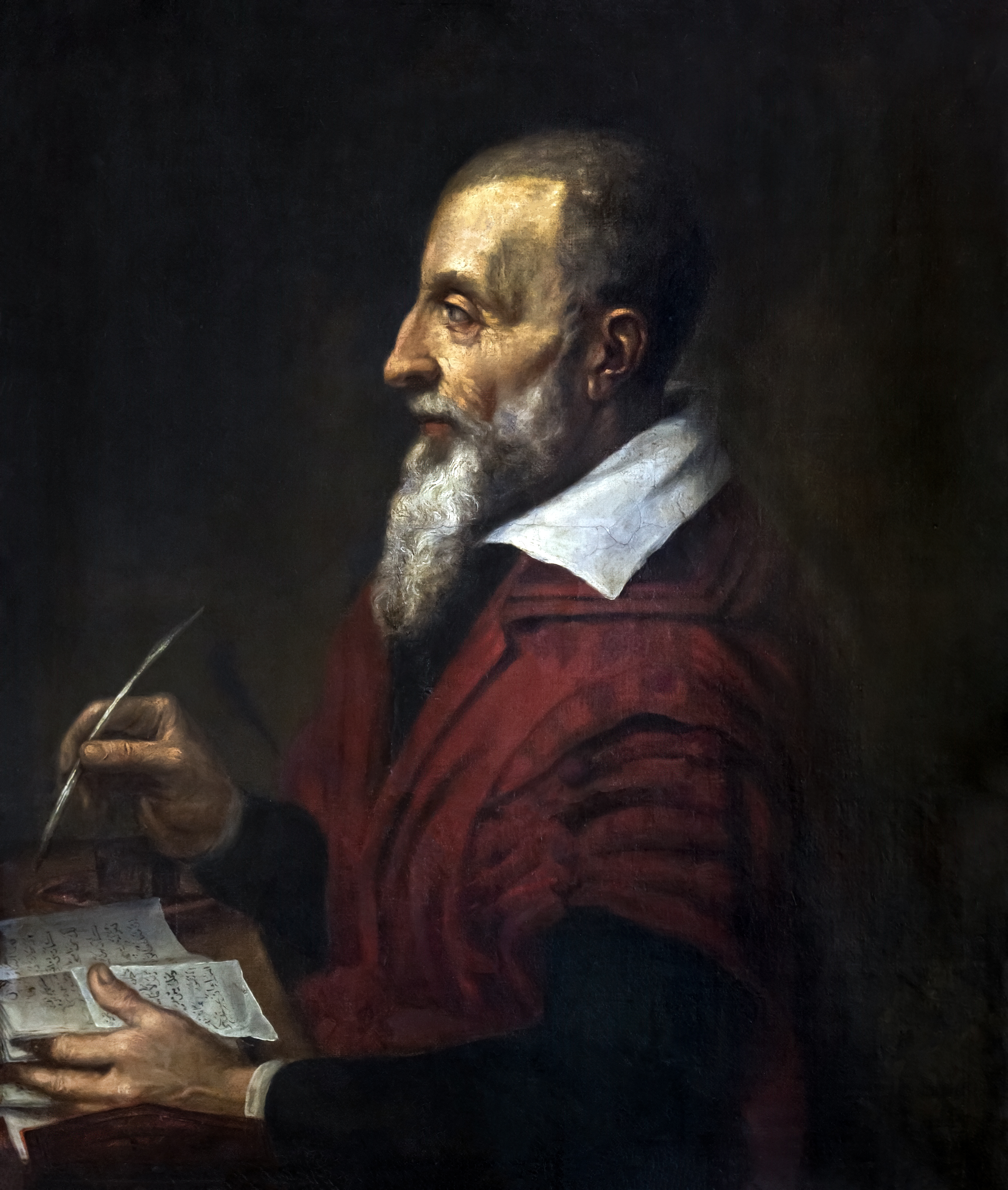
Joseph Justus Scaliger

- August 5 – Joseph Justus Scaliger, French-Italian religious leader and scholar (d. 1609).

=== Date unknown ===
- Georgette de Montenay, French author (d. 1581).
- Jean de Serres, French historian (d. 1598).
- François Viète, French mathematician (d. 1603).
- Pierre de Bocosel de Chastelard, poet (d. 1564).

== Deaths ==
- August 20 – Guillaume Budé, French scholar (b. 1467).
