= 1549 in France =

- Decades: 1520s; 1530s; 1540s; 1550s; 1560s
- See also: History of France; Timeline of French history; List of years in France

Events from the year 1549 in France.

== Incumbents ==
- Monarch – Henry II

== Events ==
=== Literature ===
- La Défense et illustration de la langue française by the poet Joachim du Bellay

== Births ==
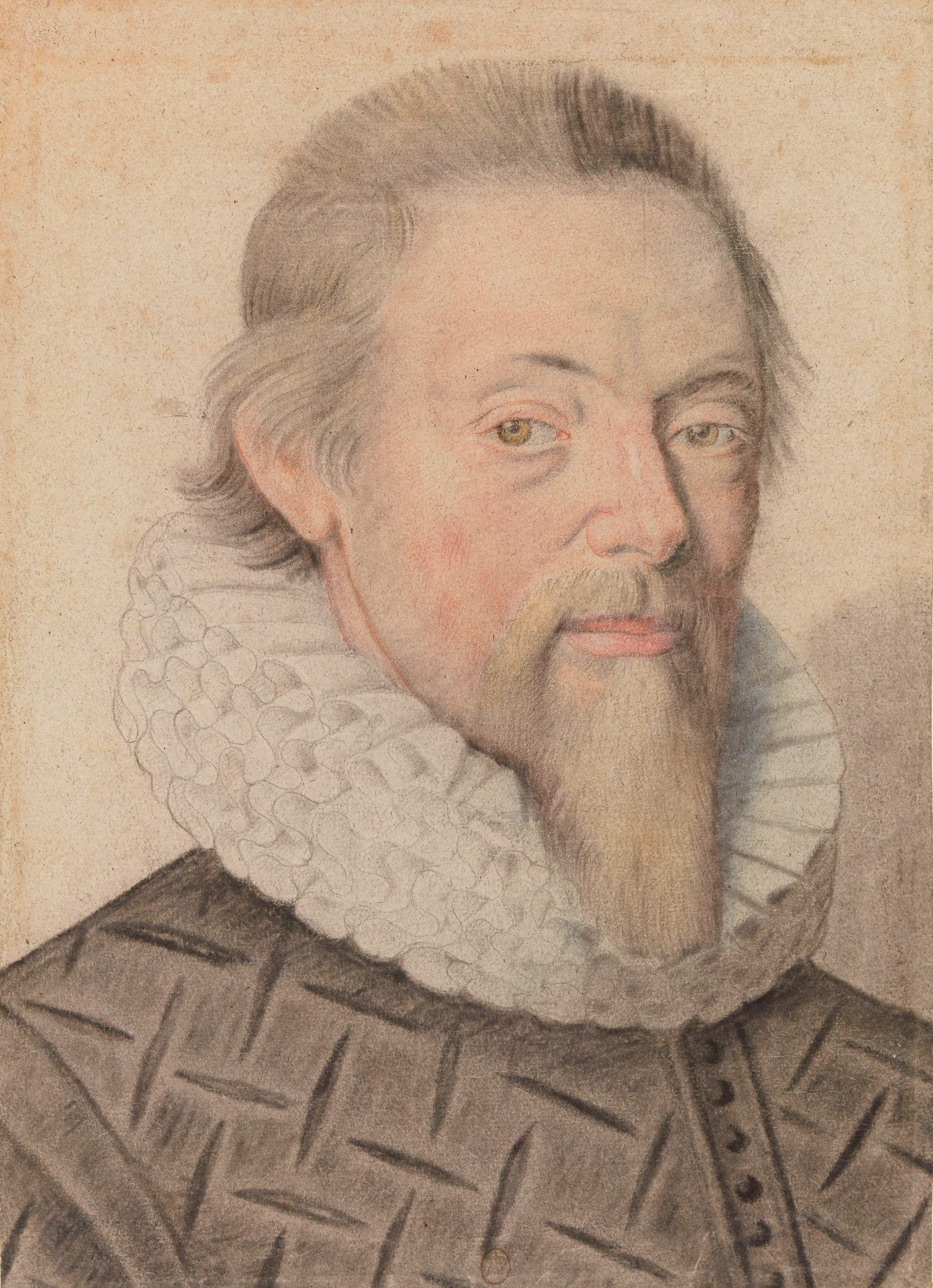
Philippe de Mornay

- 3 February – Louis of Valois, prince (d. 1550)
- 4 February – Eustache Du Caurroy, composer (d. 1609)
- 20 July – Pierre de Larivey, dramatist (d. 1619)
- 17 October – Denis Godefroy, jurist (d. 1622).
- 5 November – Philippe de Mornay, Protestant writer and member of the anti-monarchist Monarchomaques (d. 1623)

=== Full date missing ===
- Louis de Bussy d'Amboise, a gentleman at the court, a swordsman, dandy, and a lover of both sexes (d. 1579)
- Eustache Du Caurroy, composer (d. 1609)
- Jeanne de Laval, noble (d. 1586)
- Étienne Tabourot, jurist, writer and poet (d. 1590)
- Marie Touchet, Dame de Belleville (d. 1638)
- Sébastien Zamet, banker (d. 1614)

== Deaths ==
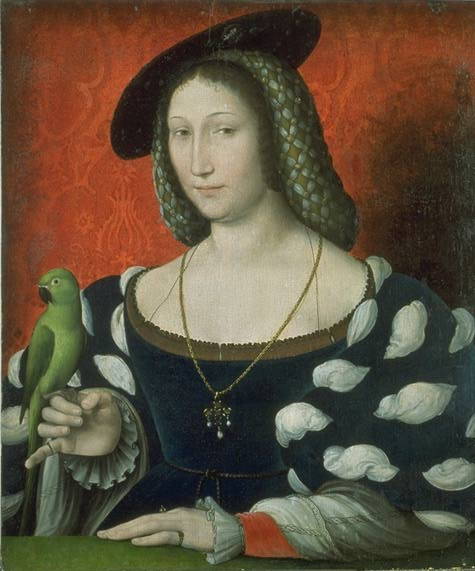
Marguerite de Navarre

- 21 December Marguerite de Navarre, the princess of France, Queen of Navarre, and Duchess of Alençon and Berry (b. 1492)

=== Full date missing ===
- Idelette Calvin (b. 1500)
- Jean de Gagny, theologian
- Michelle de Saubonne, courtier (b. 1485)
