= 1551 in France =

- Decades: 1530s; 1540s; 1550s; 1560s; 1570s
- See also: History of France; Timeline of French history; List of years in France

Events from the year 1551 in France.

== Incumbents ==
- Monarch – Henry II

== Events ==
- 27 June – Edict of Châteaubriant prohibits possessing any books listed on the University of Paris's Index, translating the Bible or works of the Church Fathers, importing books from Geneva or other places not under the Catholic Church's control, or printing or selling any religious books written in the last 40 years.

== Births ==
- 19 September – King Henry III of France (d. 1589)
- 26 October – Charlotte de Sauve, courtesan (d. 1617)

== Deaths ==
- Jean Ango, privateer (b. 1480)
