= 1545 in France =

- Decades: 1520s; 1530s; 1540s; 1550s; 1560s
- See also: History of France; Timeline of French history; List of years in France

Events from the year 1545 in France.

== Incumbents ==
- Monarch – Francis I

== Events ==
- 18–19 July – Battle of the Solent between English and French fleets. The engagement is inconclusive but on 19 July Henry VIII of England's flagship, the Mary Rose, sinks.
- c. 21 July – Battle of Bonchurch: The English reverse an attempted French invasion of the Isle of Wight off the coast of England as part of the Italian Wars.

== Births ==
- 2 April – Elisabeth of Valois, queen of Philip II of Spain (d. 1568)
- 1 May – Franciscus Junius, French theologian (d. 1602)

== Deaths ==
- 12 June – Francis I, Duke of Lorraine (b.1517).
- 7 July – Pernette Du Guillet, poet (b. c. 1520)
