= 1541 in France =

- Decades: 1520s; 1530s; 1540s; 1550s; 1560s
- See also: History of France; Timeline of French history; List of years in France

Events from the year 1541 in France.

== Incumbents ==
- Monarch – Francis I

== Events ==
- May 23 – Jacques Cartier departed from Saint-Malo on his third voyage.

=== Date Unknown ===
- John Calvin translates his Institutio Christianae religionis into French, as L'Institution chrétienne.

== Births ==
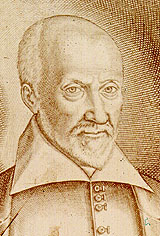
Pierre Charron

- January 26 – Florent Chrestien, writer (d. 1596)

=== Full date missing ===
- Pierre Charron, Catholic theologian and philosopher (died 1603)

== Deaths ==
=== Full date missing ===
- Georges de Selve, scholar and diplomat (born 1508)
- François II de La Trémoille, nobleman (born 1505)
- François Guillaume de Castelnau-Clermont-Ludève, diplomat and cardinal (born 1480)
- Barthélemy de Chasseneuz, jurist (born 1480)
- Jean Clouet, painter (born 1480)
- Antonio Rincon, ambassador
