= Pavillon de la Muette =

Coordinates: 48°57′50.98″N 2°7′3.25″E

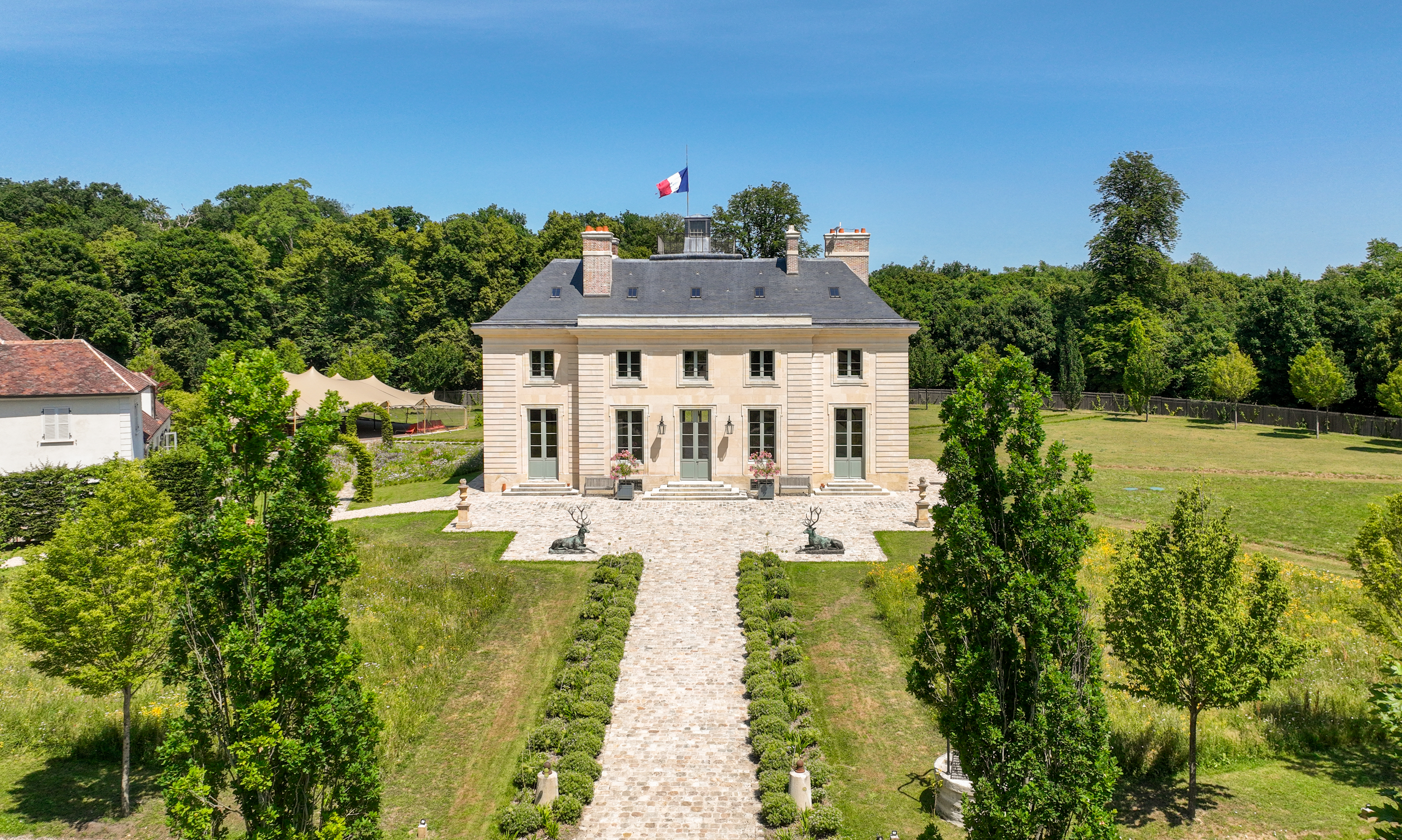
- The lodge.
- Interactive map of Pavillon de la Muette
- Location: Forest of Saint-Germain-en-Laye, Yvelines
- Completion date: 1775
- Restored date: From 2019
- Website: http://www.pavillondelamuette.com

The Pavillon de la Muette is a hunting lodge in the Forest of Saint-Germain-en-Laye, in the western Paris suburb of Saint Germain-en-Laye, Yvelines, in the western Île-de-France. It was built to a design by architect Ange-Jacques Gabriel in 1766-1775 for the French King Louis XV.

== History ==
The present lodge was built on the ruins of a château of the same name that had been constructed for King Francis I between 1542 and 1549 by the architect Pierre Chambiges. This building had a highly irregular shape, originally comprising seven levels, including a basement, with a square central section housing the reception and living rooms. The four corner towers housed small apartments. It was complemented to the north by a chapel and to the south, mirroring it, a stairwell.

Francis I used the château for hunting and for intimate stays with his family and friends, away from the court at the "old" Saint-Germain-en-Laye castle. Like the latter, the building combined brick and stone in its construction. Philibert Delorme added an upper story to create a tennis court, surmounted by a lead-covered belvedere terrace, which Jacques I Androuet du Cerceau noted in his work, The Most Excellent Buildings of France, was rapidly sinking and threatening to cause the ruin of the entire structure.

Abandoned as early as the reign of Henry II, this first château is depicted as largely in ruins during the reign of King Louis XIV, in an engraving from 1665, and it was razed shortly afterwards. The only surviving elements are basement structures and a well.

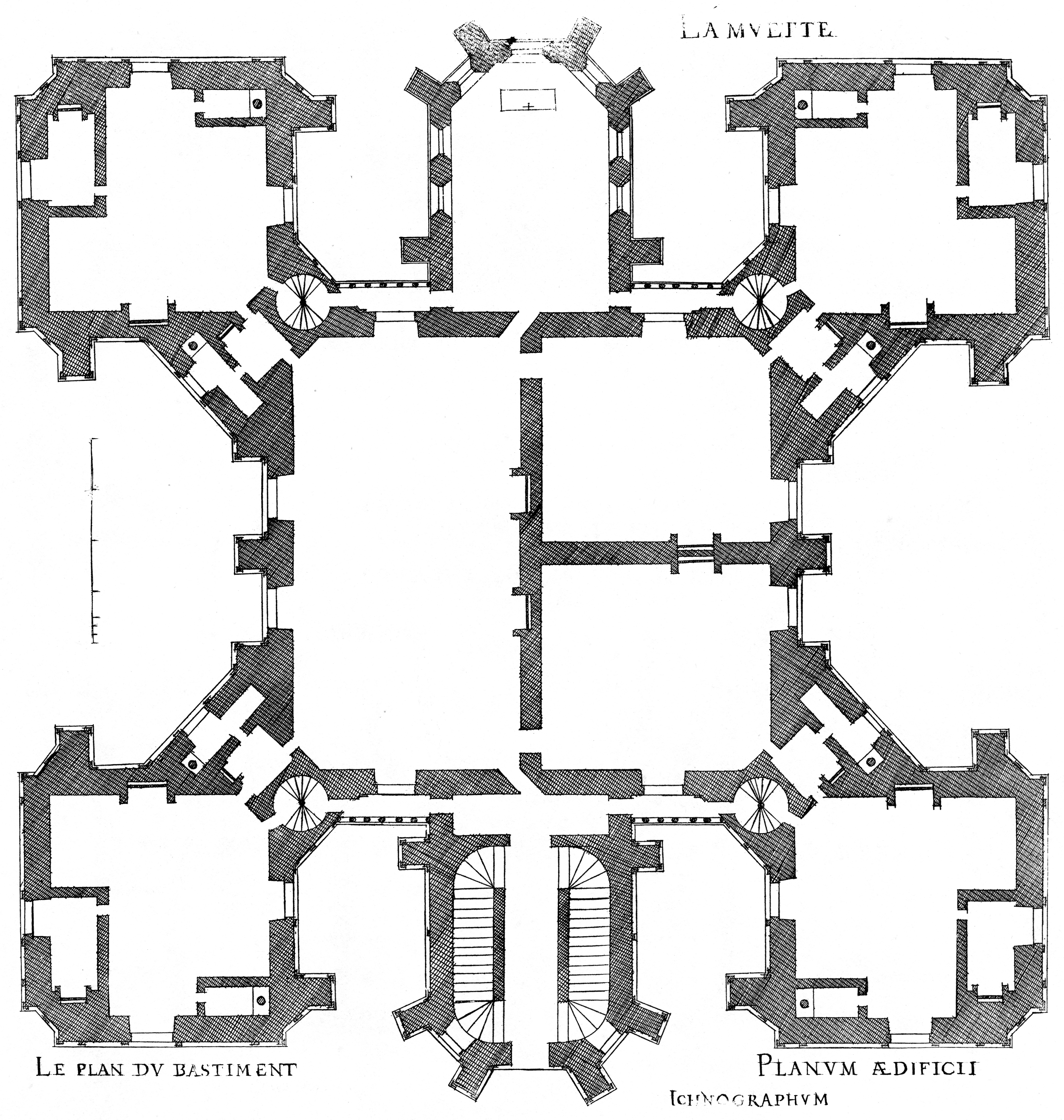
Plan of the Château de la Muette.

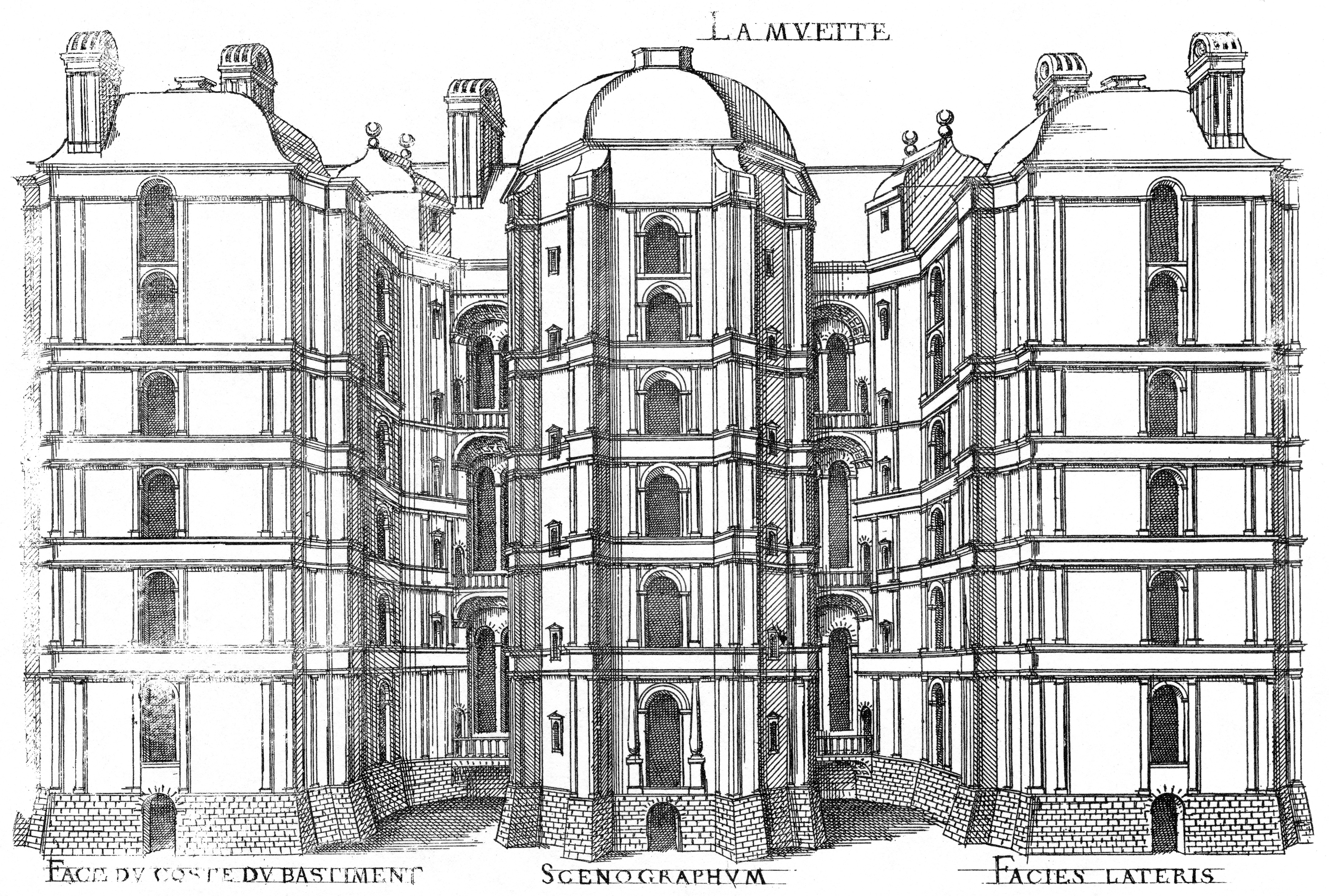
Side view of the château.

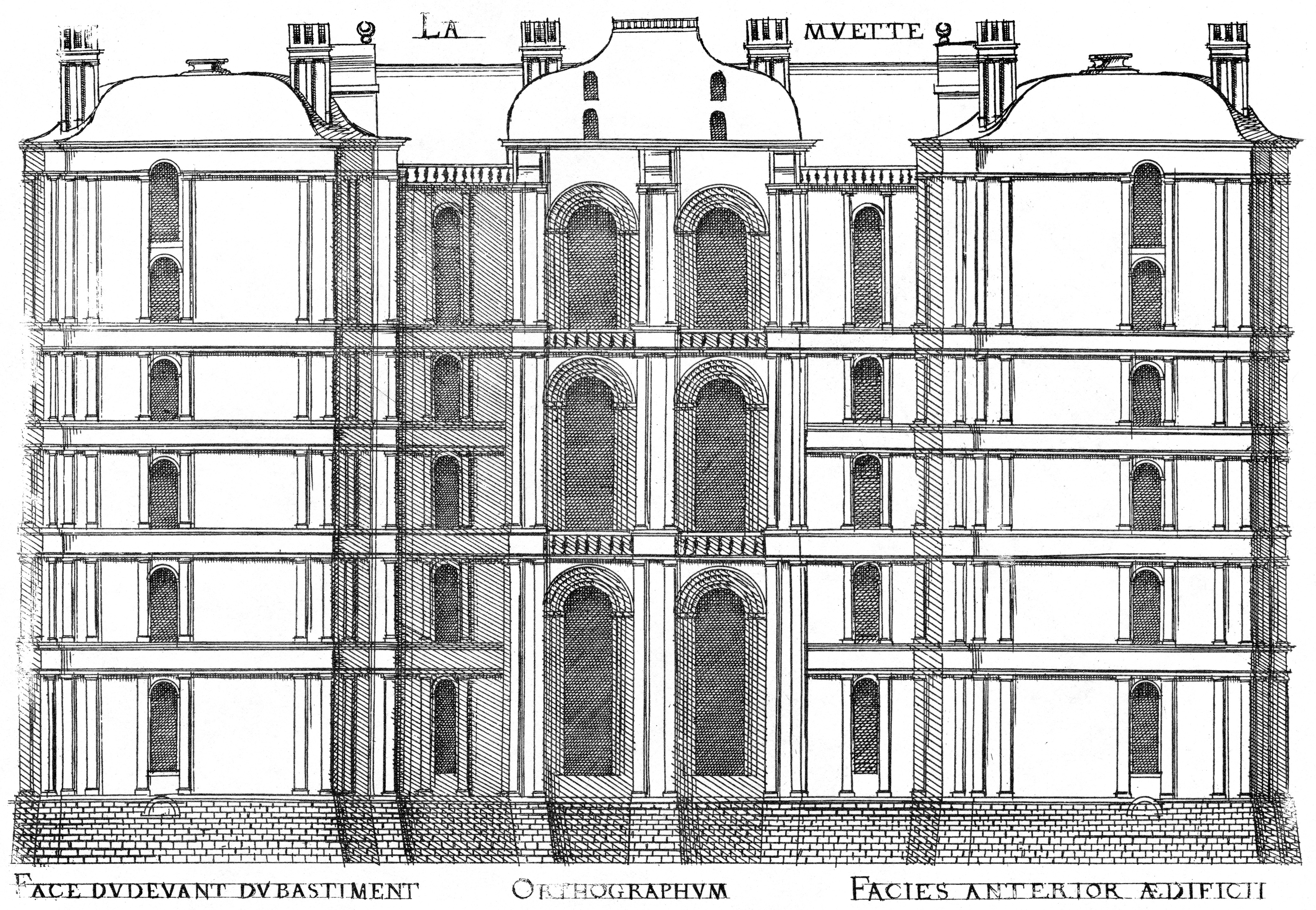
Front façade.

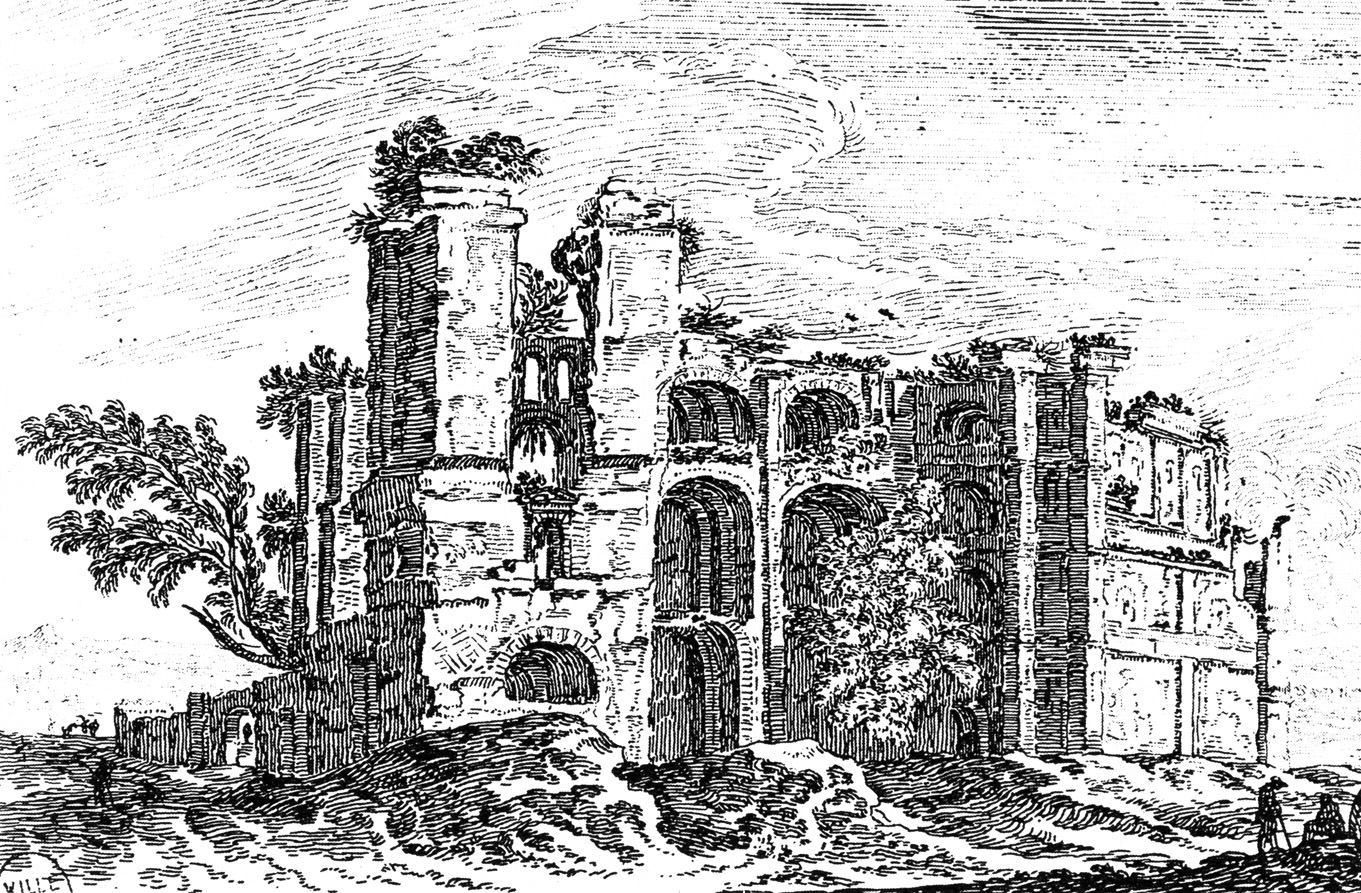
Ruins of the Château de la Muette.

== New lodge ==
In 1764, Louis XV commissioned Ange-Jacques Gabriel to design a hunting lodge in the forest. Gabriel was working at the time on the construction of the Petit Trianon. Louis XV had added the plain of Achères to the royal forest of Saint Germain-en-Laye in 1751-2 and wished to have a lodge there, where the lands were more suitable for hunting than the wet ground around the Palace of Versailles.

The first project for the lodge did not come to fruition, and Gabriel drew up new plans in 1766, in which the building was enhanced with an octagonal rotunda topped by a terrace. Construction then began on the foundations of the previous château. The pavilion was modeled after the Pavillon du Butard in La Celle-Saint-Cloud, and, with a few variations, adopted its layout. Interior woodwork was carried out by Antoine Guesnon and Christophe Clicot, who had worked at the Petit Trianon. Work progressed slowly due to the remote location of the lodge. Louis XV visited the site on January 16, 1768. All work on the interior was finally completed in 1775, a year after the death of Louis XV. The lodge was simply furnished, in contrast to the furnishings installed at the Pavillon du Butard.

To the south, a large rectangular terrace and a paved walkway were added, which do not appear on the original plans. There were plans to build a building for the hunting party further south, set back from the bridle path, but ultimately a more modest outbuilding, the forester's house, was erected immediately to the west of the pavilion and, under Charles X, was connected to a stable building. During the Bourbon Restoration, the king made extensive use of the lodge for his hunting parties, and was where he entertained close friends.

== Imperial France ==
Napoleon I began to use the lodge beginning in his time as Consul, taking a personal interest in the maintenance of the lodge. Following Napoleon's separation from Empress Joséphine, Napoleon took over the caretaker's apartment on the first floor, compensating the caretaker by building the forester's house next to the lodge. Empress Marie-Louse had a simple room nearby Napoleon's. Napoleon pincipally used the lodge for diplomatic activities and for entertaining military leaders.

Napoleon III also visited the lodge several times, and an account of a hunting trip by Marcel de Baillehache, in his "Memoirs of a Lancer of the Imperial Guard," gives a good overview of these visits. He notably received Queen Victoria and Prince Albert there on August 25, 1855, during the trip that sealed the Franco-British "Entente Cordiale."

A watercolour by Hippolyte Bellangé depicting the episode and the presentation of the pack of hounds, in front of the north entrance of the octagonal room, is preserved in the collection of the King of England, as are two sketches of the hunting party that the Queen made in her personal notebook.

== Post-19th century ==
During the 20th century the lodge was used as a weekend retreat for presidents of the Third Republic. Gabriel's design for the lodge was used as the basis for the Hunting Pavilion at the 1911 Vienna World's Fair. During Workld War II the lodge was occupied by German soldiers, who installed an anti-aircraft gun at the site, whose base remains visible. The area around the lodge saw aerial bombardment due to its proximity to major rail lines.

The lodge was still used in the 1950s, 1960s, and 1970s to house the training studio of OCORA Radio France, an institution dependent on the French Office of Broadcasting and Television (ORTF), directed by Pierre Schaeffer and responsible for training future radio executives in the colonies.

From the early 1980s onwards, the lodge fell into a state of advanced disrepair. It was acquired in 2014 by diplomat Frédéric Journès and Bulgarian painter Hristo Mavrev, following a bidding process organized by the French State Property Department on behalf of the National Forestry Office (ONF), to which it belonged. After encountering difficulties with restoration, the property was transferred to Emmanuel Basse and Benoit d'Halluin in 2019. Since 2020, the pavilion has been treated for dry rot, the roof and timber frame have been removed and entirely rebuilt, the damaged stones of the facade have been replaced, and the collapsed floors have been reconstructed. Full restoration was completed in 2024.

The lodge can be visited upon request, and on selected summer days.

== Description ==
In the basement there are spacious kitchens whose design is reminiscent of the warming room at the Petit Trianon.

On the ground floor, slightly elevated above the terraces, the building features a large central vestibule to the south and a drawing-room to the west, both of which retain remarkable cabochon paving. To the east, there is a staircase and a service room, and the large octagonal drawing-room to the north was fitted in the 19th century with a parquet floor whose central motif is star-shaped.

The upper floor comprises two bedrooms, to the south and west, and a service room. There is a belvedere terrace, built at the beginning of the reign of Louis XVI, that was a source of deterioration due to water infiltration.

Its exterior is restrained, notably lacking a triangular pediment, sculptures, and bas-reliefs. Only rusticated corner quoins are present, as well as the arched windows on a rectangular background, located on the rotunda side, which are characteristic of Gabriel's style. The choice of a clean, uncluttered design is evident and reflects the shift in architecture and decorative arts at the end of Louis XV's reign towards greater simplicity.

In the grounds surrounding the pavilion, old plans show a large circular tree-lined avenue that has now disappeared. To the north, a terrace conforming to the original plans was recently uncovered.

== Gallery ==
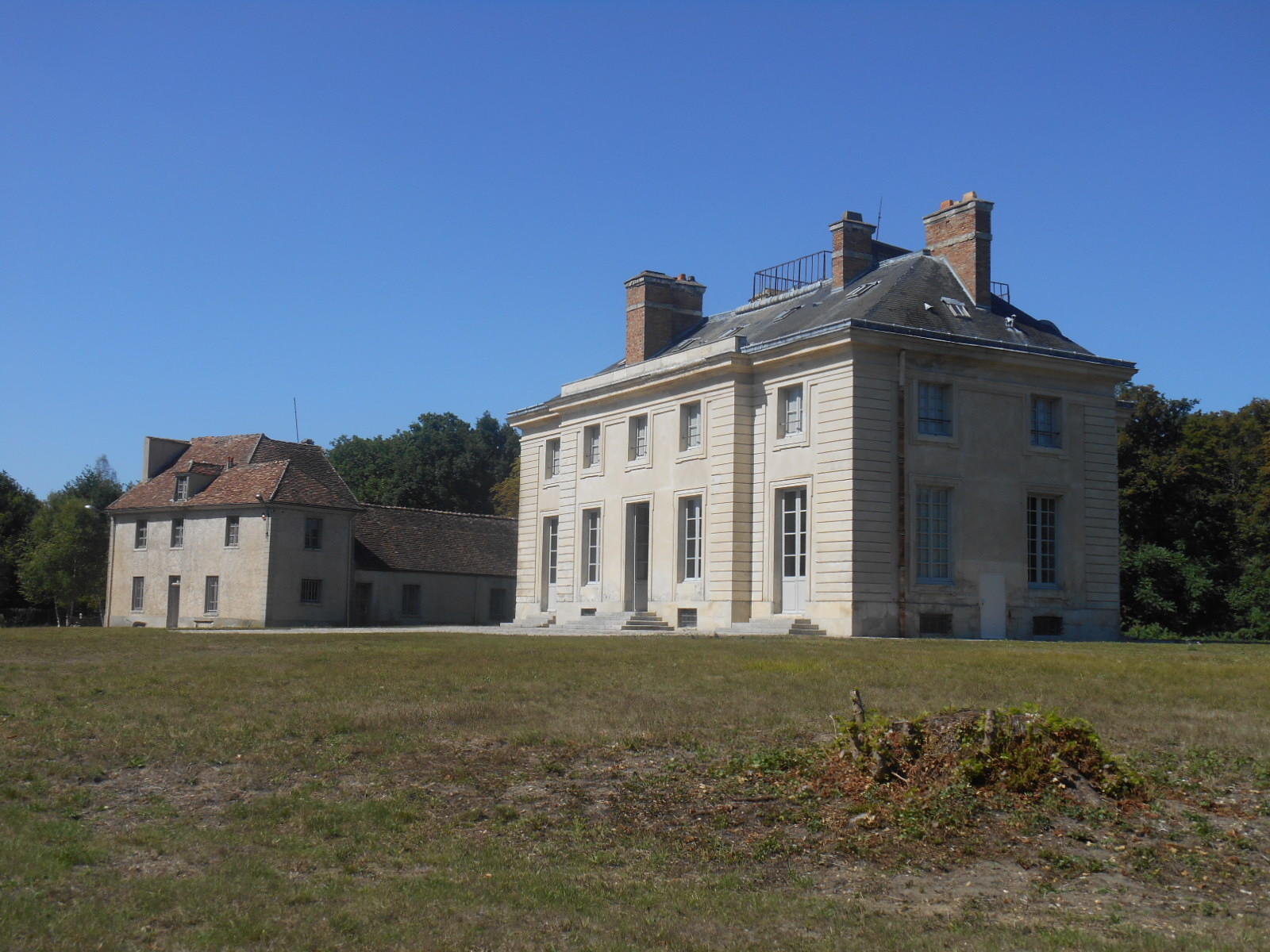
The lodge from a three-quarter right view..

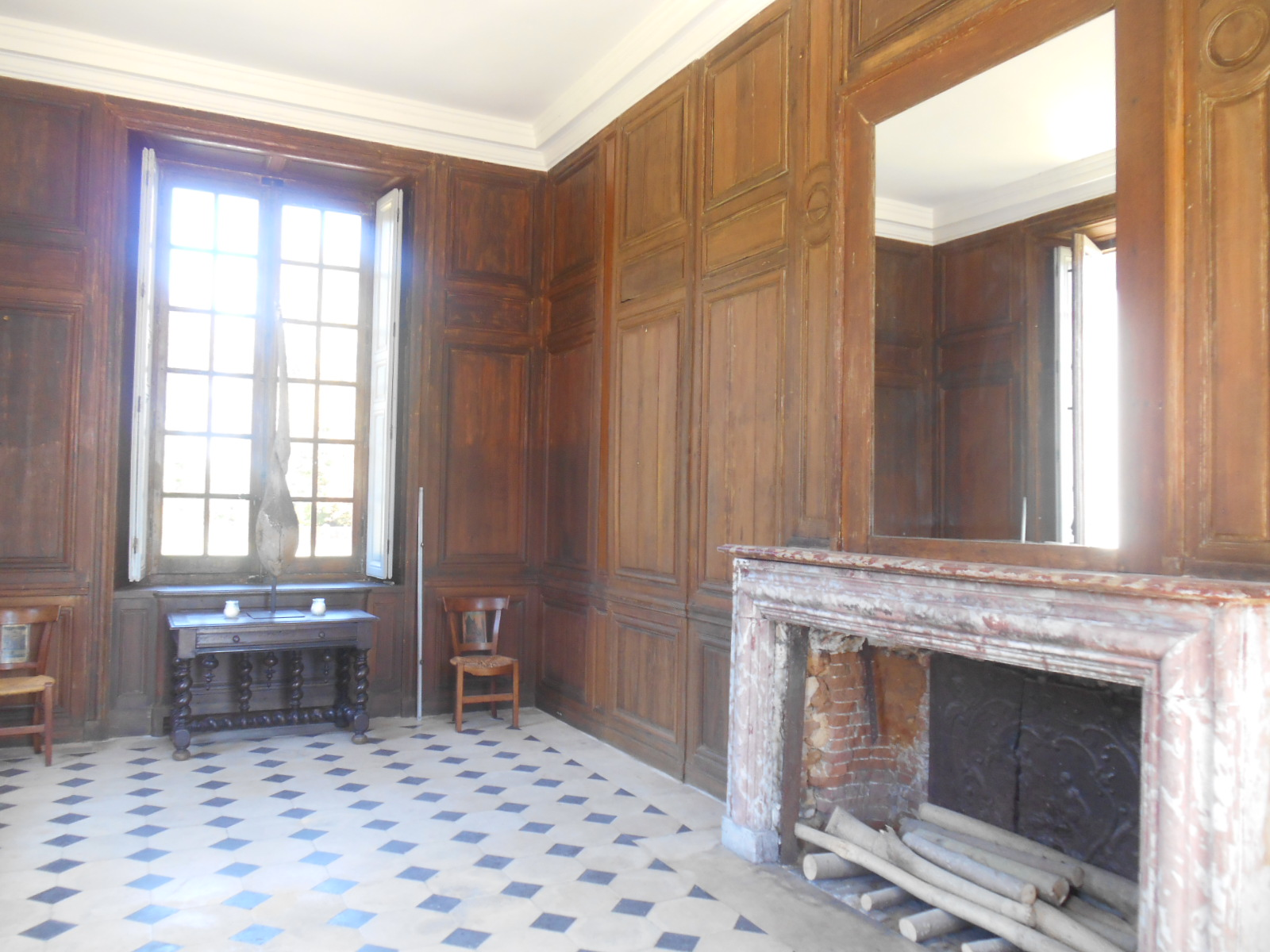
Hunting officers' room.

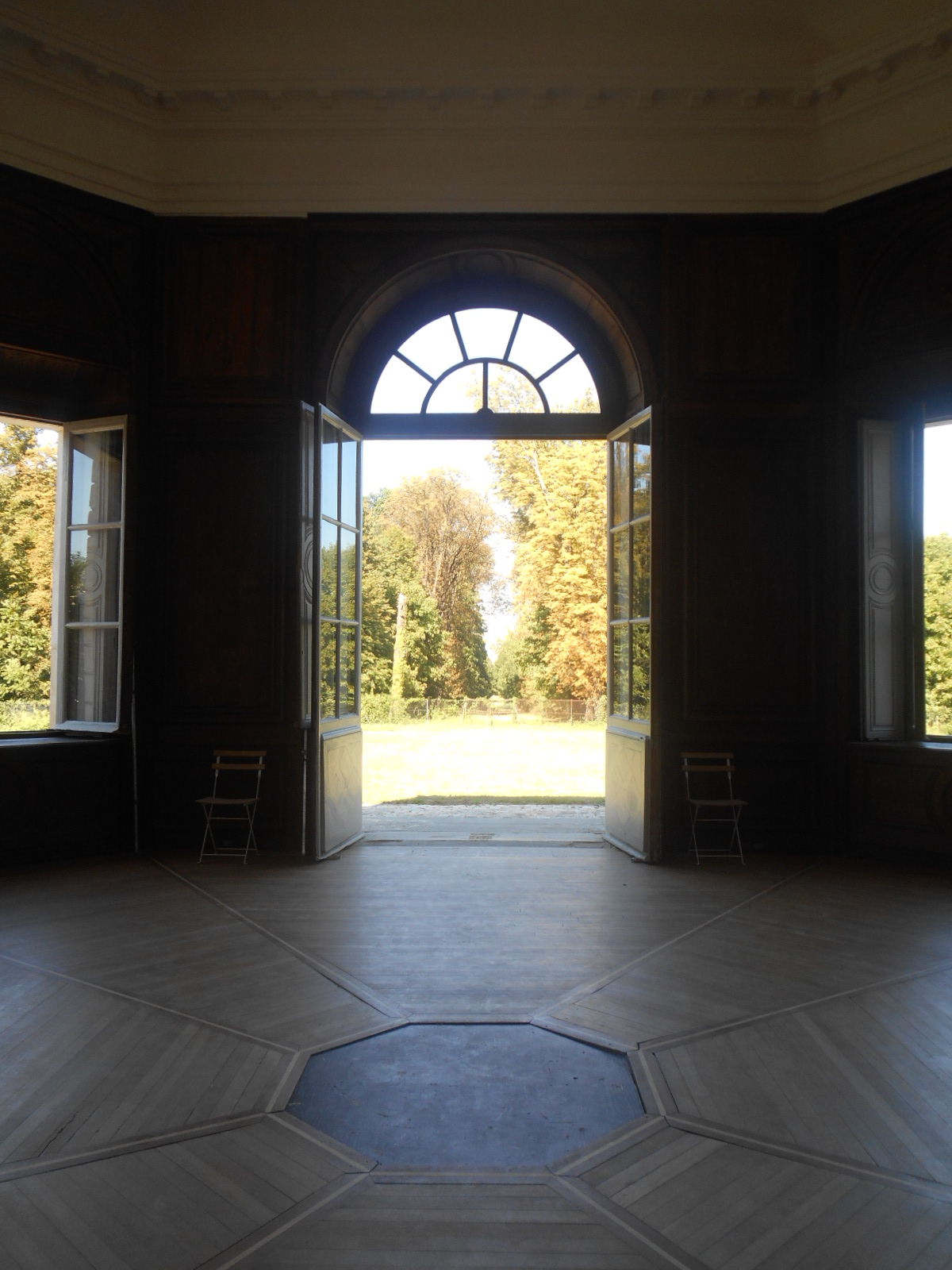
Octagonal drawing room.

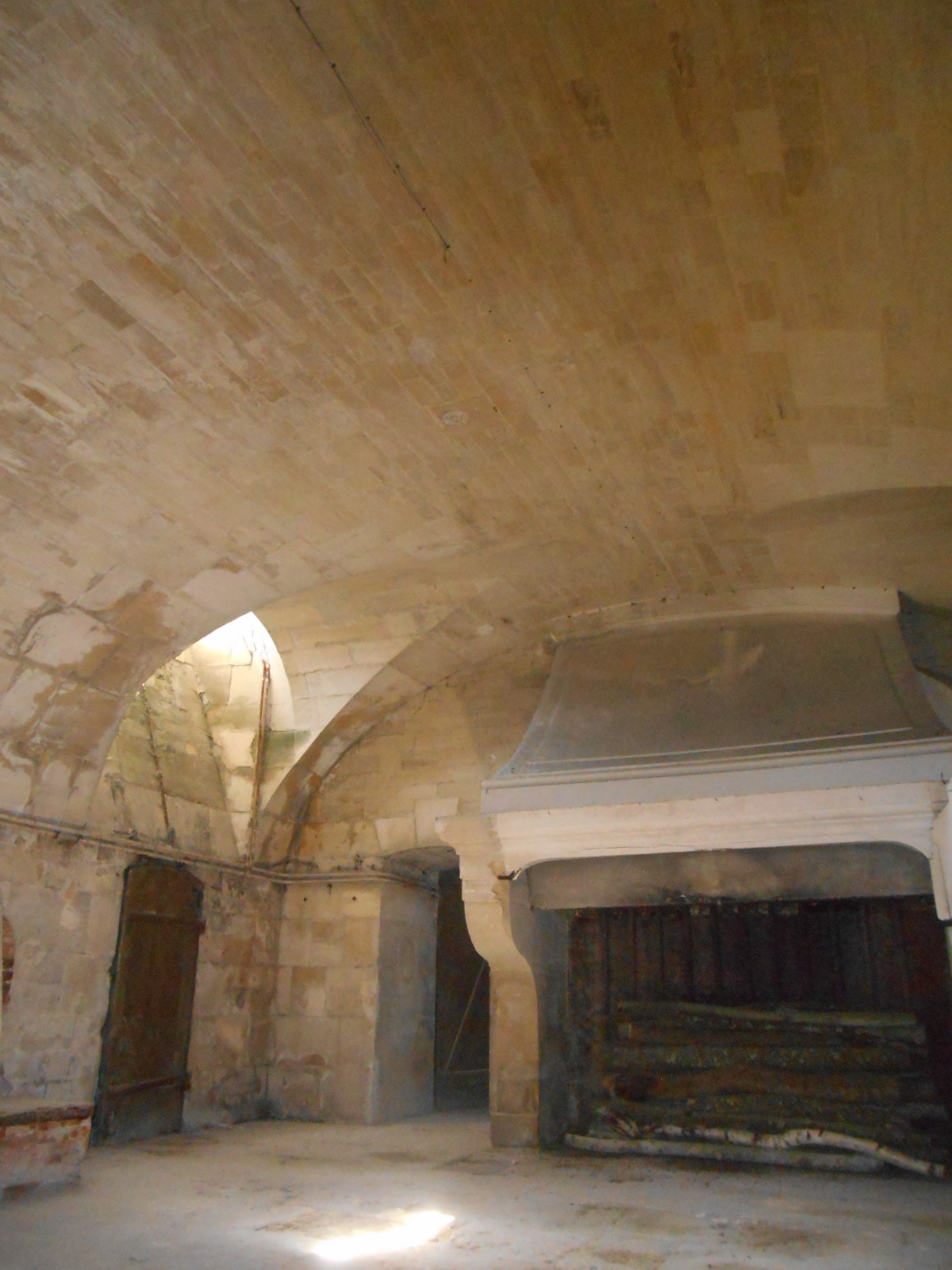
Basement.

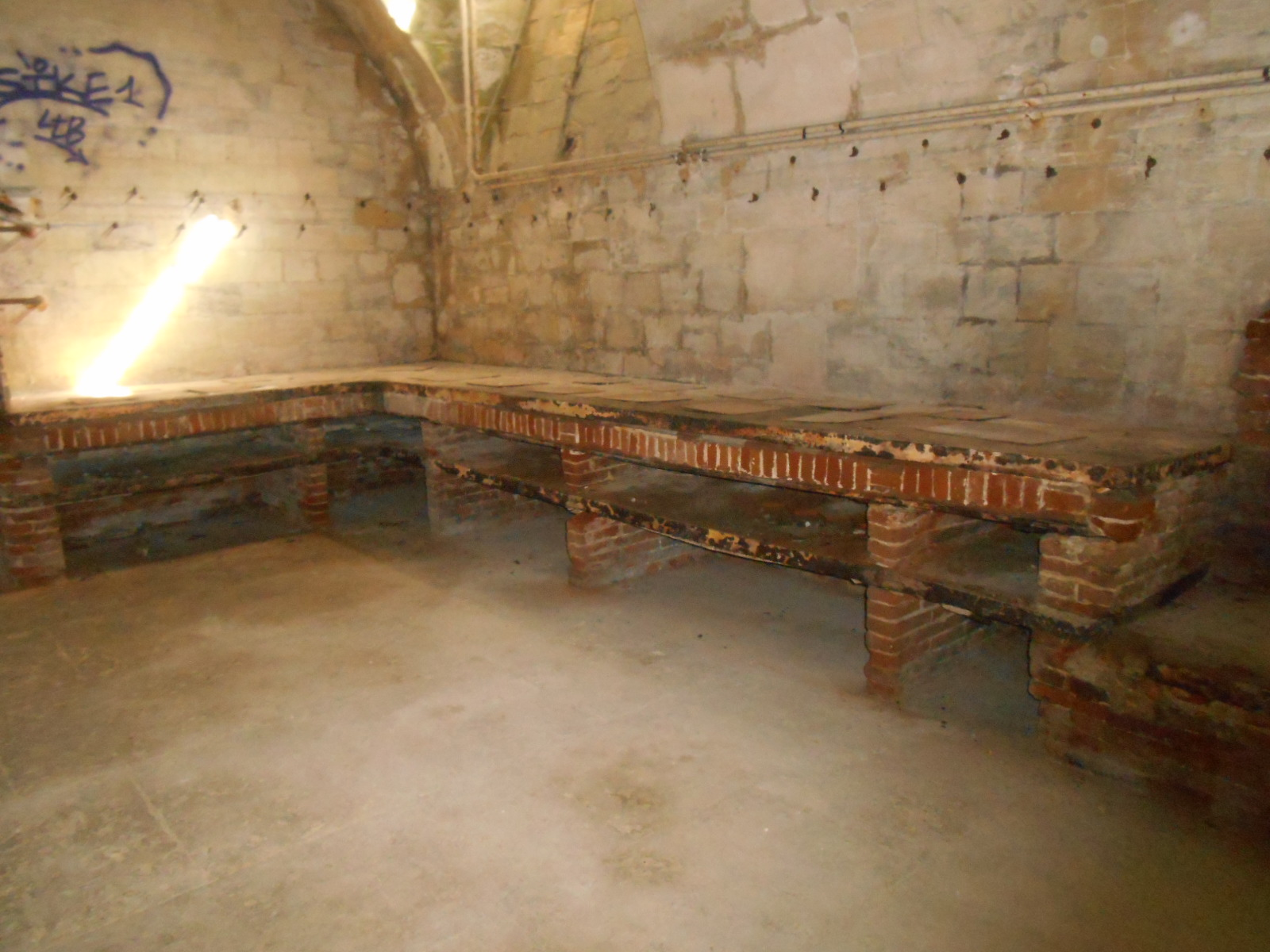
Warming room.

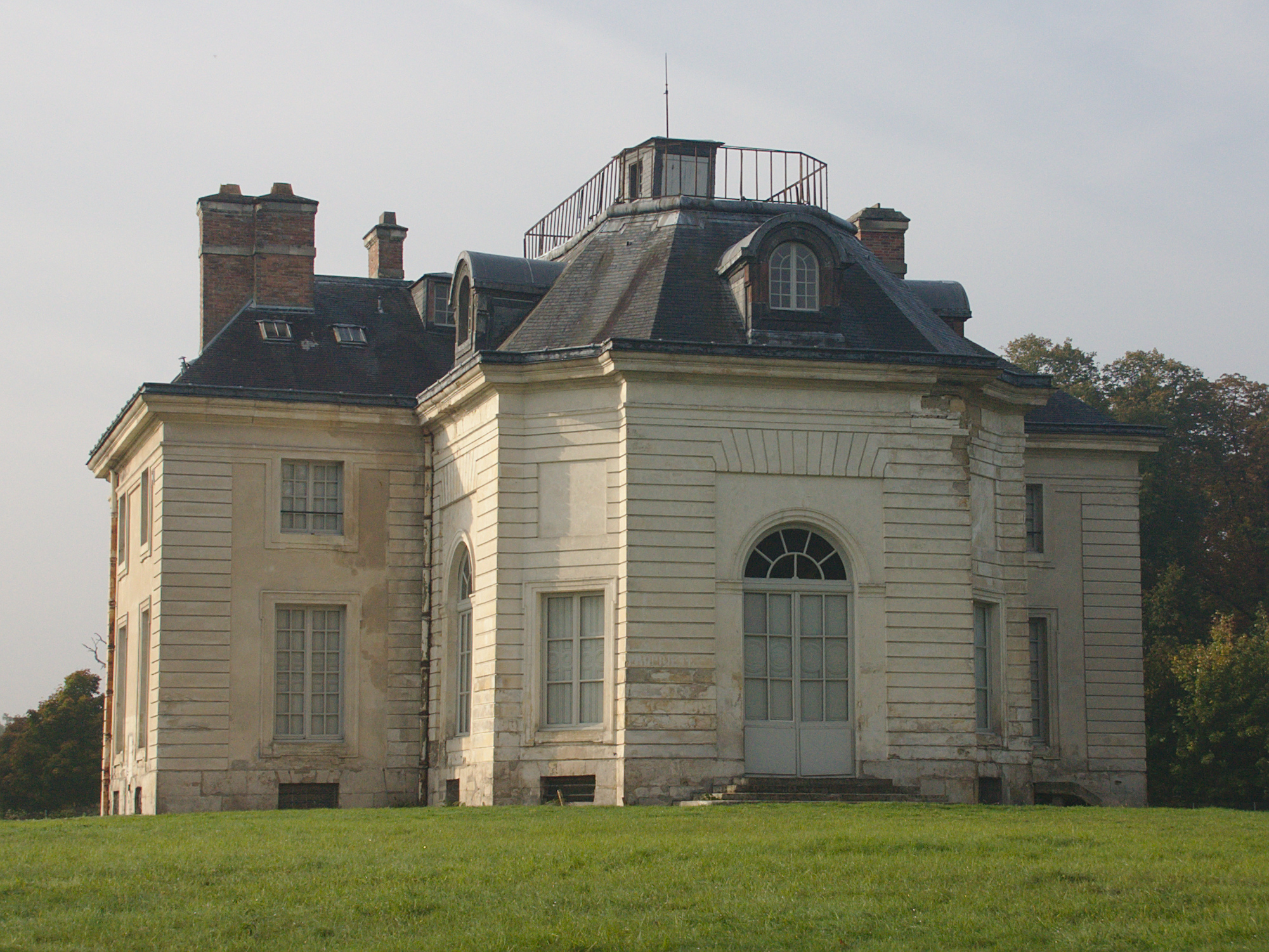
Rear

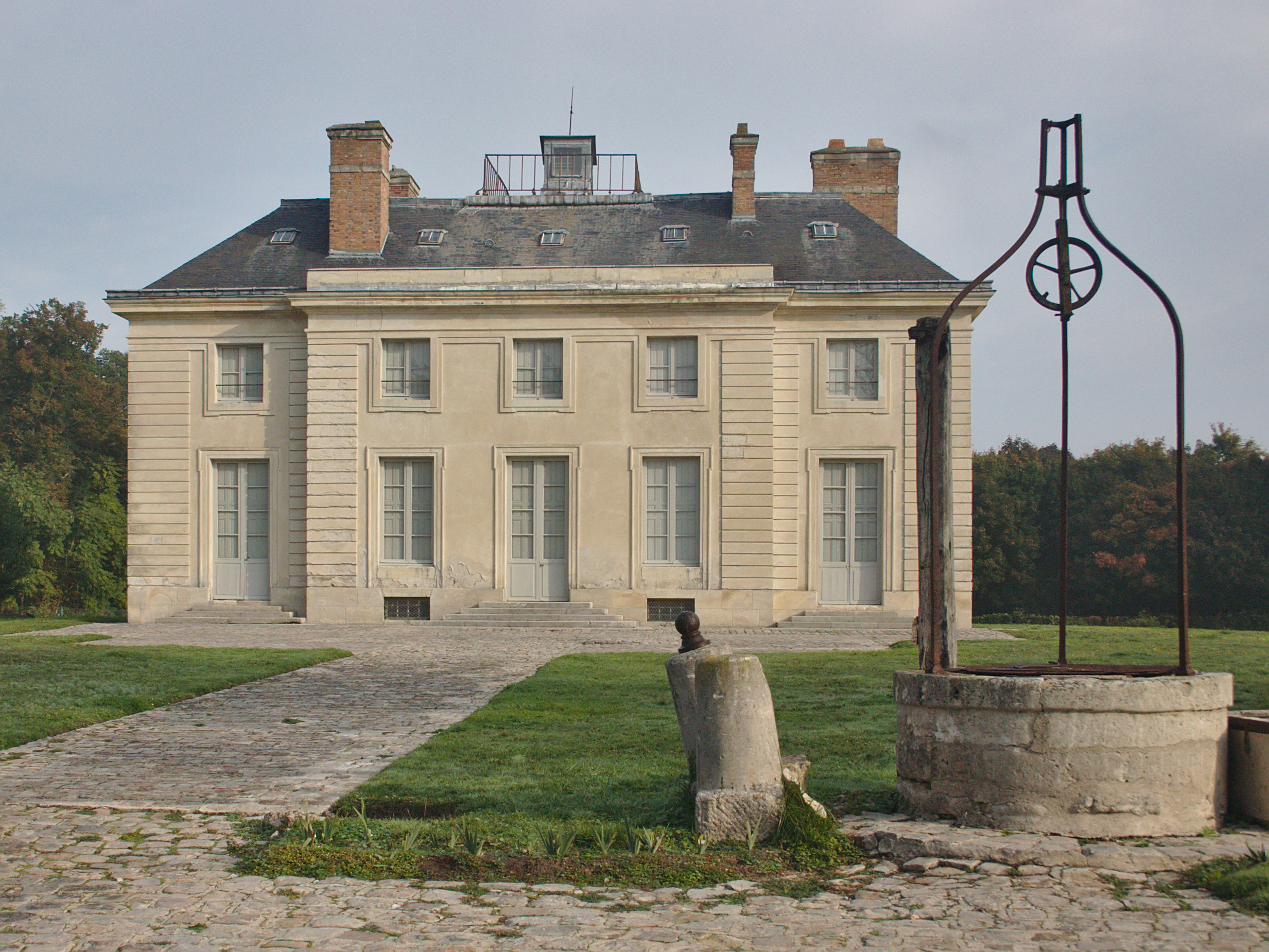
Front

== Historic designation ==
The building was classified as a historical monument in 1921.
