= 1550 in France =

- Decades: 1530s; 1540s; 1550s; 1560s; 1570s
- See also: History of France; Timeline of French history; List of years in France

Events from the year 1550 in France.

== Incumbents ==
- Monarch – Henry II

== Events ==
- March 24 – "Rough Wooing": England and France sign the Treaty of Boulogne, by which England withdraws from Boulogne in France and returns territorial gains in Scotland.
- The first grammatical description of the French language is published by Louis Maigret.

== Births ==
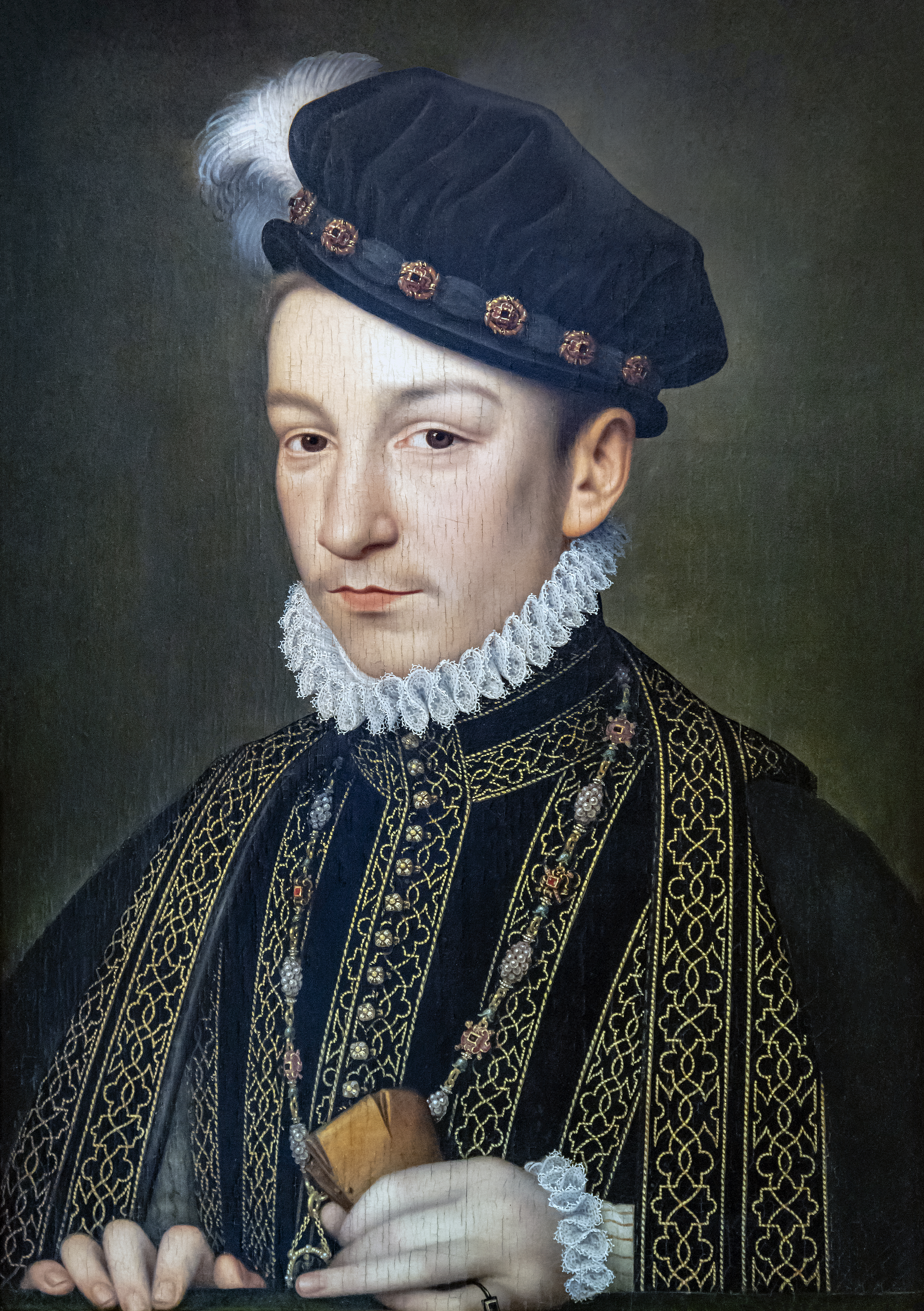
Charles IX, King of France 1560–1574

- July 27 – Charles IX of France (died 1574)

=== Full date missing ===
- Jean Beguin, iatrochemist (died 1620)
- Marin le Bourgeoys, artist and inventor (died 1634)

== Deaths ==
April 12 – Claude, Duke of Guise, French aristocrat and general (b.1496).

=== Full date missing ===
- Philippe de la Chambre, cardinal (b. c.1480)
- Jean, Cardinal of Lorraine (b. 1498)
- Eguinaire Baron, jurist (b.1495)
- Georges II d'Amboise, bishop and cardinal (b. 1488)
- Catherine d'Amboise, writer and poet (b.1475)
