= 1542 in France =

- Decades: 1520s; 1530s; 1540s; 1550s; 1560s
- See also: History of France; Timeline of French history; List of years in France

Events from the year 1542 in France.

== Incumbents ==
- Monarch – Francis I

== Events ==
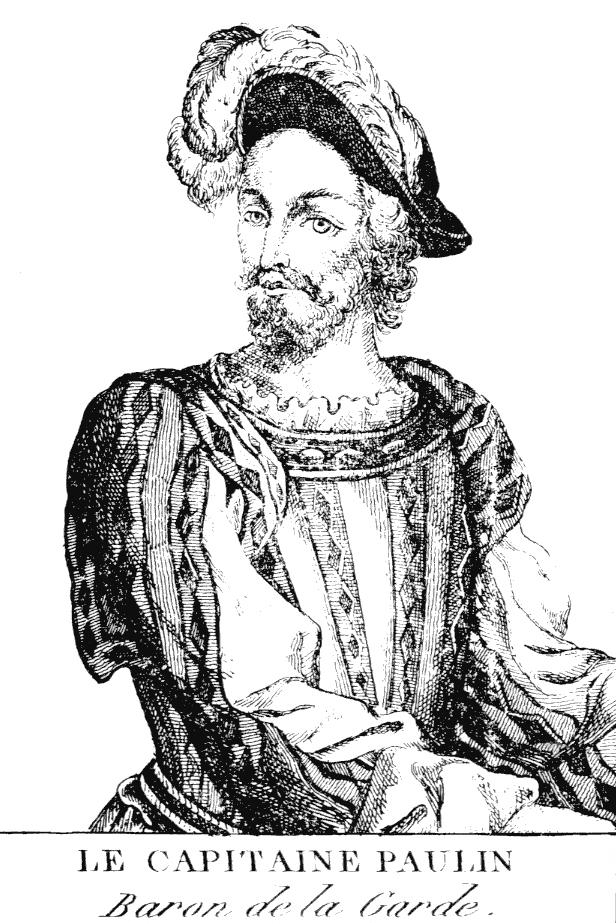
- Antoine Escalin des Aimars
  March 8 – Antoine Escalin des Eymars, the French ambassador, returns from Constantinople with promises of Ottoman aid in a war against Charles V, Holy Roman Emperor.
- July 12 - King Francis I, after allying with Suleiman the Magnificent, declares war once again on Charles V, starting the Italian War of 1542–1546.

== Births ==
- October 31 – Henriette of Cleves, French noblewoman (d.1601)
