= Pierre Chambiges =

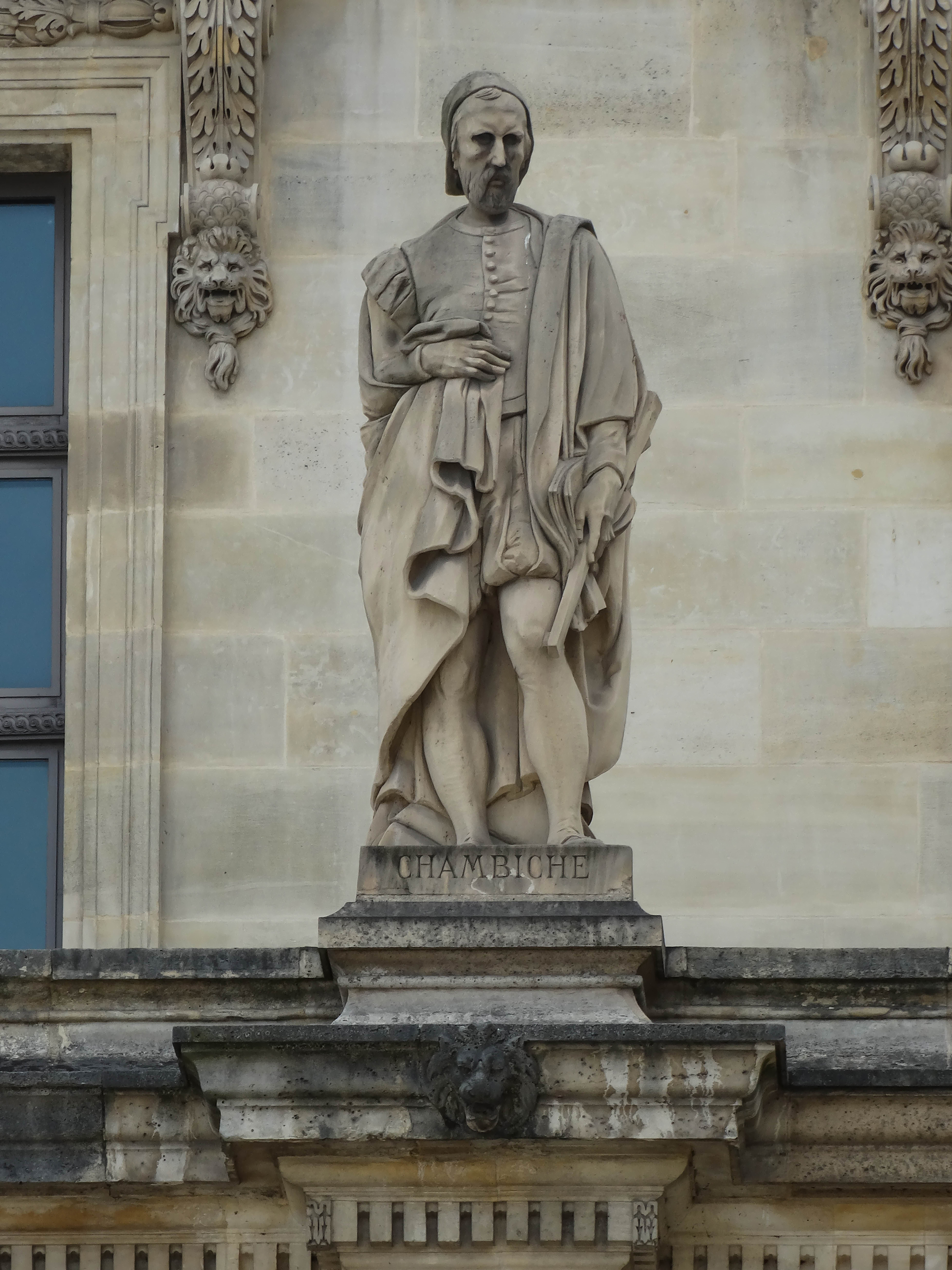
A statue of Pierre Chambiche by Jules-Antoine Droz, placed on the Aile en retour Mollien of the Palais du Louvre in 1857.

Pierre Chambiges (died 19 June 1544) was a French master mason (maître des œuvres de maçonnerie et pavement de la Ville de Paris) and architect to François I of France and his son Henri II.

As surveyor and architect, Chambiges was involved in numerous royal and official projects:

- The cathedral of Notre-Dame de Senlis
- The Palais du Louvre
- The Hôtel de ville of Paris; he oversaw the construction of the design by Domenico da Cortona (1533 onwards; demolished)
- The Château de Saint-Germain-en-Laye and the first Pavillon de la Muette in the park
- The Château de Fontainebleau
- The Château de Challeau, near Fontainebleau (modified, then demolished)

For Anne de Montmorency he designed and built the Château de Chantilly.

The son of mason Martin Chambiges (c.1465–1532), whose west front of the cathedral of Troyes, begun in 1507 occupied him for several decades, he died in Paris.
