= André Guijon =

French churchman and orator

André Guijon (November, 1548 – September, 1631) was a French churchman and orator.

He was born in Autun, the son of Jean Guijon, a physician and Oriental scholar, who travelled in the East and brought back to France a Greek manuscript copy of the New Testament, dating from the eleventh century. He had three brothers with more than one title to fame: Jacques, Jean, and Hugues, all three lawyers, writers, and savants.

Philibert de la Mare, counsellor at the Parliament of Dijon, collected the principal works of the four brothers in one volume, in quarto of 612 pages, under the title "Jacobi, Joannis, Andreæ et Hugonis fratrum Guiionorum opera varia" (1658). This contained both their prose works and Latin poems.

André became vicar-general to Cardinal de Joyeuse, and afterwards to the Bishop of Autun. He went to Rome to be consecrated and came back to France in 1586. His "Remontrance à la cour du Parlement de Normandie sur l'octroy des sentences fulminatoires" is extant. His "Eloge funèbre de Pierre Jeannin" has not been preserved.
