= Jacques Le Bossu =

French theologian

Jacques Le Bossu (Paris, 1546 – Rome, 1626) was a French Benedictine theologian and Doctor of the Sorbonne.

== Life ==
He entered the Benedictine Order at the Royal Abbey of St. Denis, of which he became claustral prior. He was preceptor to the Cardinal de Guise and took a prominent part in the Catholic League and the disputes concerning the successor to Henry III of France, whose death he considered to be a just punishment.

The accession of Henry IV of France, against whom he had written, and the assassination of de Guise in 1588, necessitated his leaving France in 1591, and he went to Rome, where he entered the service of the Curia. He was made a consultor of the Congregatio de Auxiliis, established in 1599 to settle the controversy on grace between the Dominicans and the Jesuits.

On its dissolution, in 1607, he desired to return to France, but the pope, Pope Paul V, kept him in Rome.

== Works ==
His chief work consisted of Animadversiones against twenty-five propositions of Molina, a Spanish Jesuit who had written a book on grace, defending the doctrines of Duns Scotus against those of the Dominicans. The Animadversiones were published by Antonio Raynaldo, the Dominican, in 1644.

Le Bossu's Diarium Congregationis de Auxiliis has been lost.
