= Martin Chambiges =

French architect

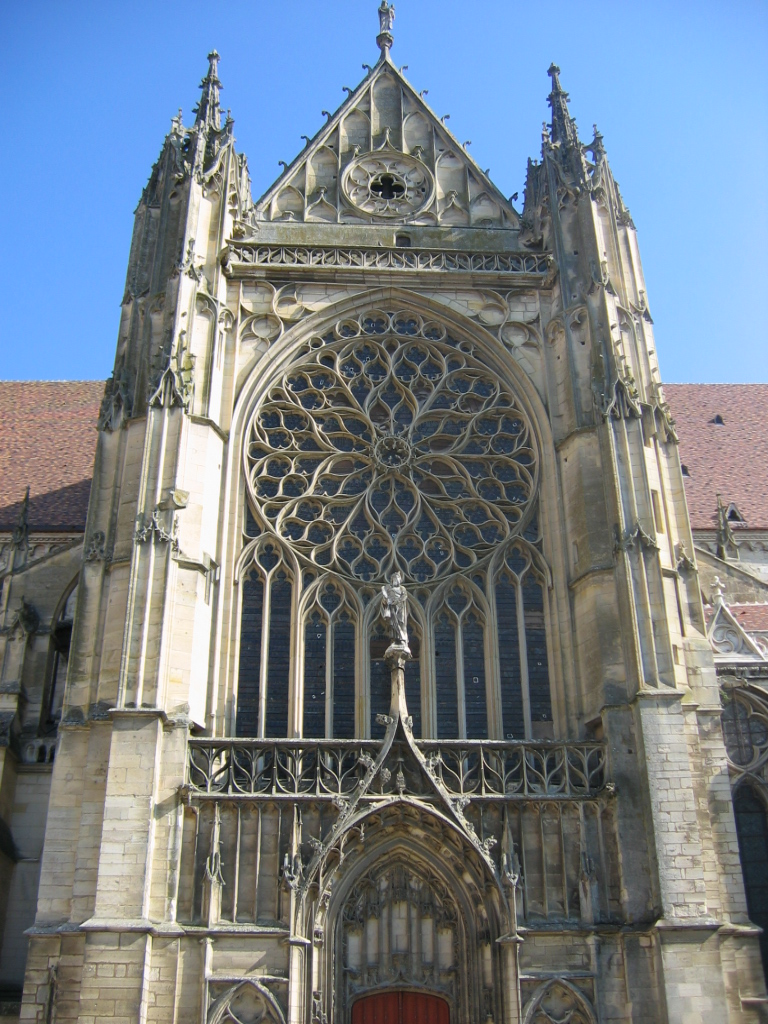
Sens Cathedral

Martin Chambiges (1460 – 29 August 1532) was a French architect from Paris working in the flamboyant gothic style. His chief works are the transepts of Sens Cathedral (in 1494), of Senlis Cathedral, and of Beauvais Cathedral (1499), in addition to the west front of Troyes Cathedral (1502–1531)

He also designed the unusual choir of the church of St. Etienne in Beauvais. He was honored by the French and they named a street after him in Paris, fr:Rue Chambiges. It is one of the top residential streets in Paris which is behind Avenue Montaigne in the Golden Triangle. He was the father of Pierre Chambiges and is buried in Beauvais Cathedral.
