= Pierre de La Primaudaye =

French writer

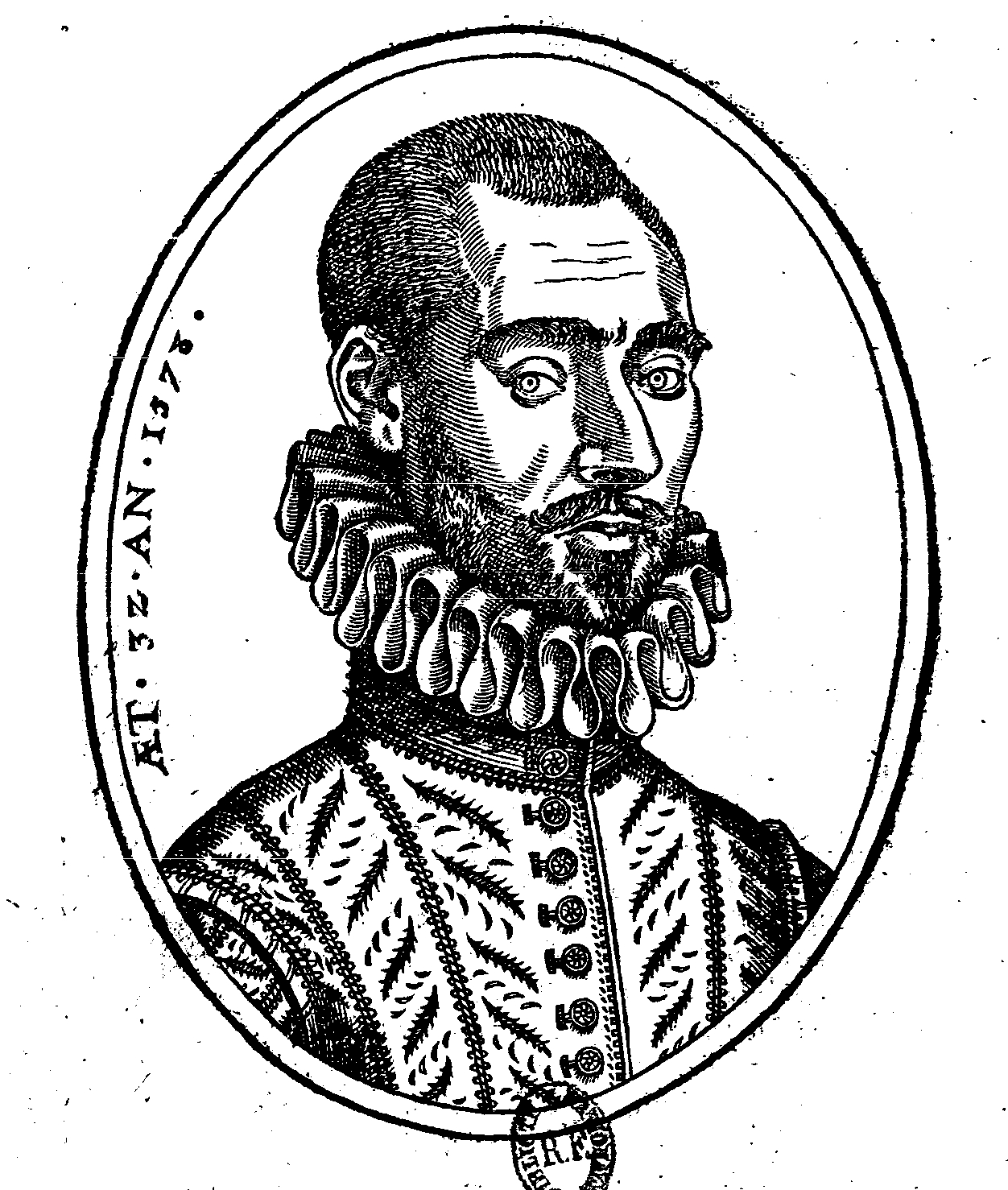
Engraving of Pierre de la Primaudaye, dated to 1573

Pierre de La Primaudaye (1546–1619) was a French writer. He is known particularly for L'Academie Française, which was influential in English translations, from 1584 onwards, particularly The French Academie of 1618.

La Primaudaye came from a large Protestant family in Anjou. There is little evidence about his childhood, but it is known that one of his brothers was executed for killing a member of the gentry, since La Primaudaye refers to his sadness over this event. In 1580 he was a gentilhomme de la chambre (gentleman of the bedchamber) for Francis, Duke of Anjou, the youngest son of king Henry II of France. In this position he published a large variety of books on intellectual topics, most notably L'Academie Française, which summarised philosophical and scientific knowledge of the era. Stuart Gillespie describes it as a "prose compendium of scientific, moral and philosophical knowledge". It may have been used as a source by Shakespeare.

La Primaudaye followed L'Academie Française with a similar work on religious matters, La Philosophie chrestienne de l'Academie françoise (the Christian philosophy of the French Academy), a book published in 1598 and signed "From Primaudaye, advisor and steward of the King."

La Primaudaye's work has an essay-like character, with some similarities to Montaigne, but he is consistently pious rather than sceptical in tone.

== Publications ==
- Académie française, divisée en dix-huit journées [traitant] de l'institution des mœurs, et de ce qui concerne le bien et heureusement vivre en tous états et conditions, par les préceptes de la doctrine et les exemples de la vie des anciens sages et hommes illustres (1577) online text
- Suite de l'Académie françoise, en laquelle il est traicté de l'homme et comme par une histoire naturelle du corps et de l'âme (1580)
- Troisième tome de l'Académie françoise (1590) online text of 1596 edition
- La Philosophie chrestienne de l'Academie françoise. Des vrais & seuls moyens de la vie bien-heureuse (1598) online text
- Quatrains du vray heur (1589) online text
- Les Vrayes consolations et sainctes prières de l'âme fidèle (1604)
- Les Quatrains du Président Favre, auxquels ont este adjoustez 100 quatrains consolatoires du Sr de La Primaudaye (1609)
- Advis sur la nécessité et forme d'un S. Concile pour l'union des Églises chrestiennes en la foy catholique (1611)

== Translations ==
- English translation, The French Academie (1618)
