= Louis Bellaud =

French poet (1543–1588)

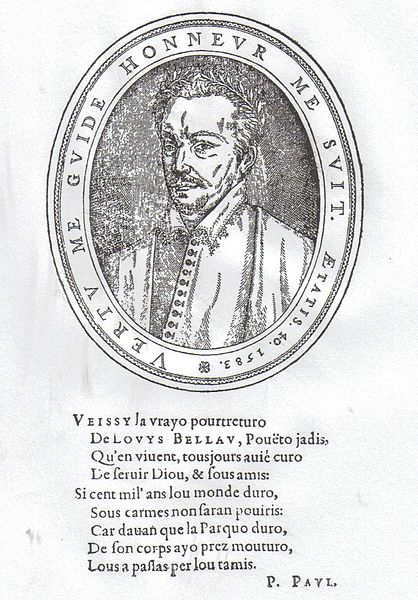

Louis Bellaud (1543–1588), also known as Bellaud de la Bellaudière, was an Occitan language writer and poet from Provence.

== Biography ==
Bellaud was born in Grasse, the son of a nobleman who then settled in Aix-en-Provence, where he received his education. During his youth he was a friend of Charles and Michel de Nostredame, sons of Nostradamus.

During the War of Religion he served in the Royal army. When he was dismissed, after a brief period of peace, he tried to travel by sea departing from Bordeaux. Nevertheless, he had to serve again; after which he tried to return to Provence in 1578. He was then arrested in Moulin and remained imprisoned for 20 month and here he wrote nostalgic poems of his youth in his native language. This work was the only one he published during his lifetime with the title Don don infernal ("don don" being the noise of the bell he used to hear in his cell);

After being released, he finally returned to Aix where his conduct led him back to prison a couple of time until he entered the Court of Henri d'Angoulême Great Prairer of Order of Malta until the violent death of his master in 1586.

Bellaud went then to Marseille in order to join Pèire Pau, his uncle-in-law and an influential man, close to Charles de Casaulx (first consul during the episode of Marseille republic).

He finally died in Grasse in 1588.

Pèire Pau published part of his work.
