= Eustorg de Beaulieu =

French poet, composer and pastor

Eustorg de Beaulieu or Hector de Beaulieu (c. 1495 – 8 January 1552) was a French poet, composer and pastor. He was one of the first French authors to convert to protestantism.
