= Gilles Le Breton =

French architect and master-mason

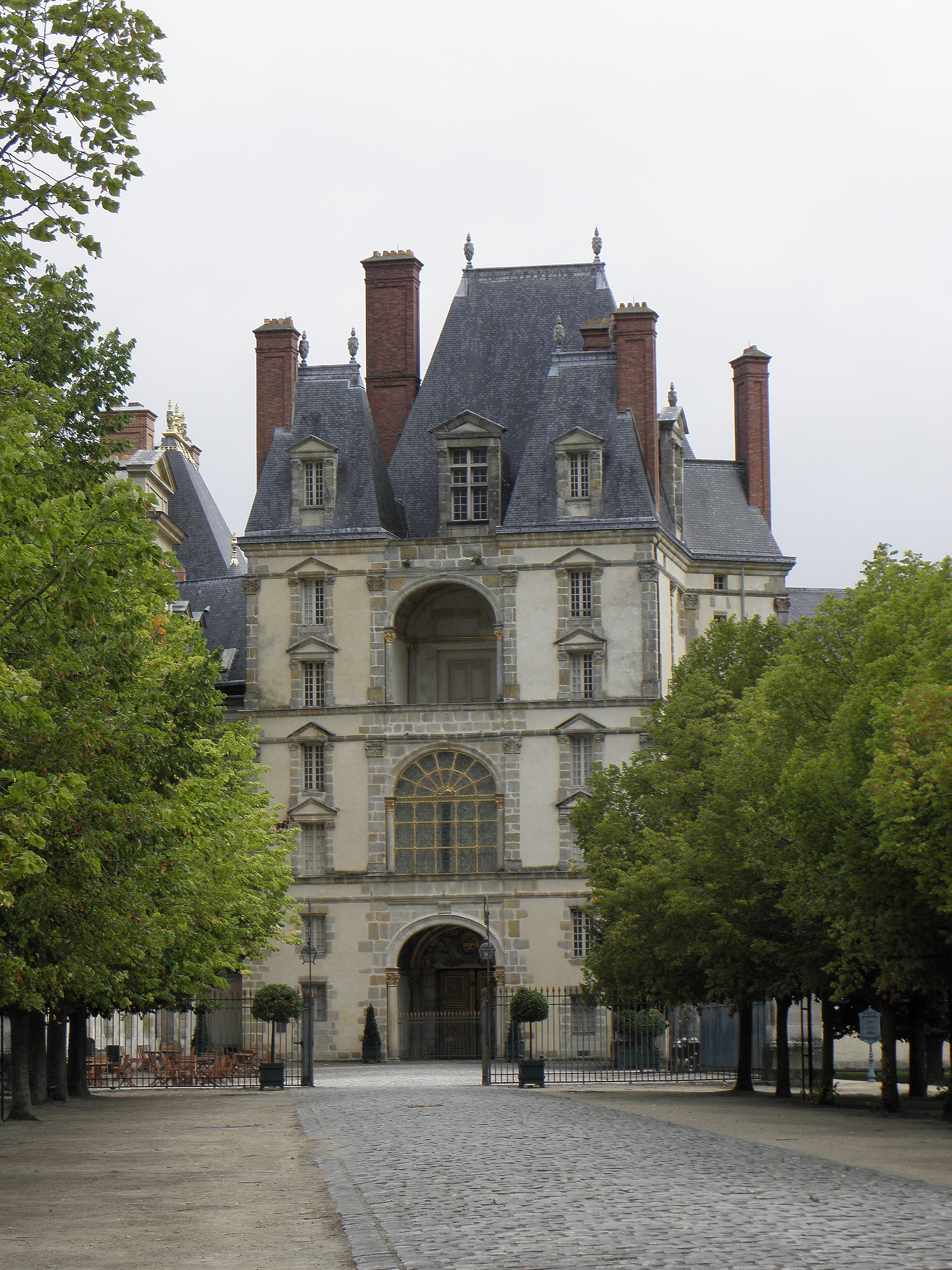
Le Breton's Porte Dorée at Fontainebleau (1528–1540)

Gilles Le Breton (died 1553) was a French architect and master-mason during the Renaissance. He is best known as the mastermind of much of the present-day Château de Fontainebleau.He was among the earliest architects involved in transforming the château from a medieval residence into a Renaissance palace under Francis I.

== Career ==
In 1526, Le Breton was working at the Château de Chambord under Pierre Nepveu. In 1527, he was appointed “maître général des oeuvres de Maçonnerie du roi,” or master-mason. It was around this time that Francis I started renovations on Fontainebleau, the former medieval hunting lodge of the French monarchs, just to the southeast of Paris. On April 28, 1528, Le Breton signed a contract with the king to pull down the old entrance tower and erect another, along with several smaller towers and galleries. Le Breton was next contracted to construct the Chapel of St. Saturnin and renovate a staircase in August 1531. The work was done in a distinct French Renaissance style which combined Italian and medieval French architectural ideas. He was promised 18,000 livres for work on the grand staircase, per a contract in March 1540. Philibert de l'Orme, the architect of Francis I, acknowledged and verified Le Breton's works later in 1540. Though de l'Orme became the lead architect of Fontainebleau in 1548, it is believed that Le Breton remained on the project until his death.

Surviving works of Le Breton's at Fontainebleau include the Porte Dorée and loggia, the Cour Ovale, the Cour du Cheval Blanc, and the chapel of La Trinité.

These works formed part of the major rebuilding campaign initiated by Francis I beginning in 1528.

Le Breton died in the village of Avon, near Fontainebleau, in the department of Seine-et-Marne, in 1553.
