= Charles du Dros =

French governor of Mondovi

Charles du Dros (fl. 1544) was the French governor of Mondovì during the Italian War of 1542, and was killed during the Battle of Ceresole.

== Bibliography ==
- Oman, Charles. A History of the Art of War in the Sixteenth Century. London: Methuen & Co., 1937.
