= Jacques Rabelais =

- Born: c. 1547
- Died: c. 1622
- Occupation: Writer
- Writing career
- Notable work: History Vivante

Jacques Rabelais (c. 1547 – c. 1622) was a minor French Renaissance writer and scholar. Known mostly for his ties to grandfather François Rabelais, Jacques wrote several essays and one book that chronicled the history of other literature.

Much of Jacques' life is unknown. His birth date is approximated the middle of 1574, and is based on a letter dated 1574-03-05 from his father Auguste Rabelais, where he wrote that his wife had experienced the "quickening of Jacques" one week prior. Based on the works he wrote about, it's likely that he spent most of his life in southern France. An undated letter documents Jacques's death occurring at 75 years.

== Works ==
- (untitled) (1612), a discussion of Abbey of Thélème, a utopia conceived by grandfather François, and its relevance in changing a France
- History Vivante (1618), a collection of essays and discussions on French literature and folk tale evolution, much of which is focused on the stories of grandfather François
