= 1681 in France =

- Decades: 1660s; 1670s; 1680s; 1690s; 1700s
- See also: History of France; Timeline of French history; List of years in France

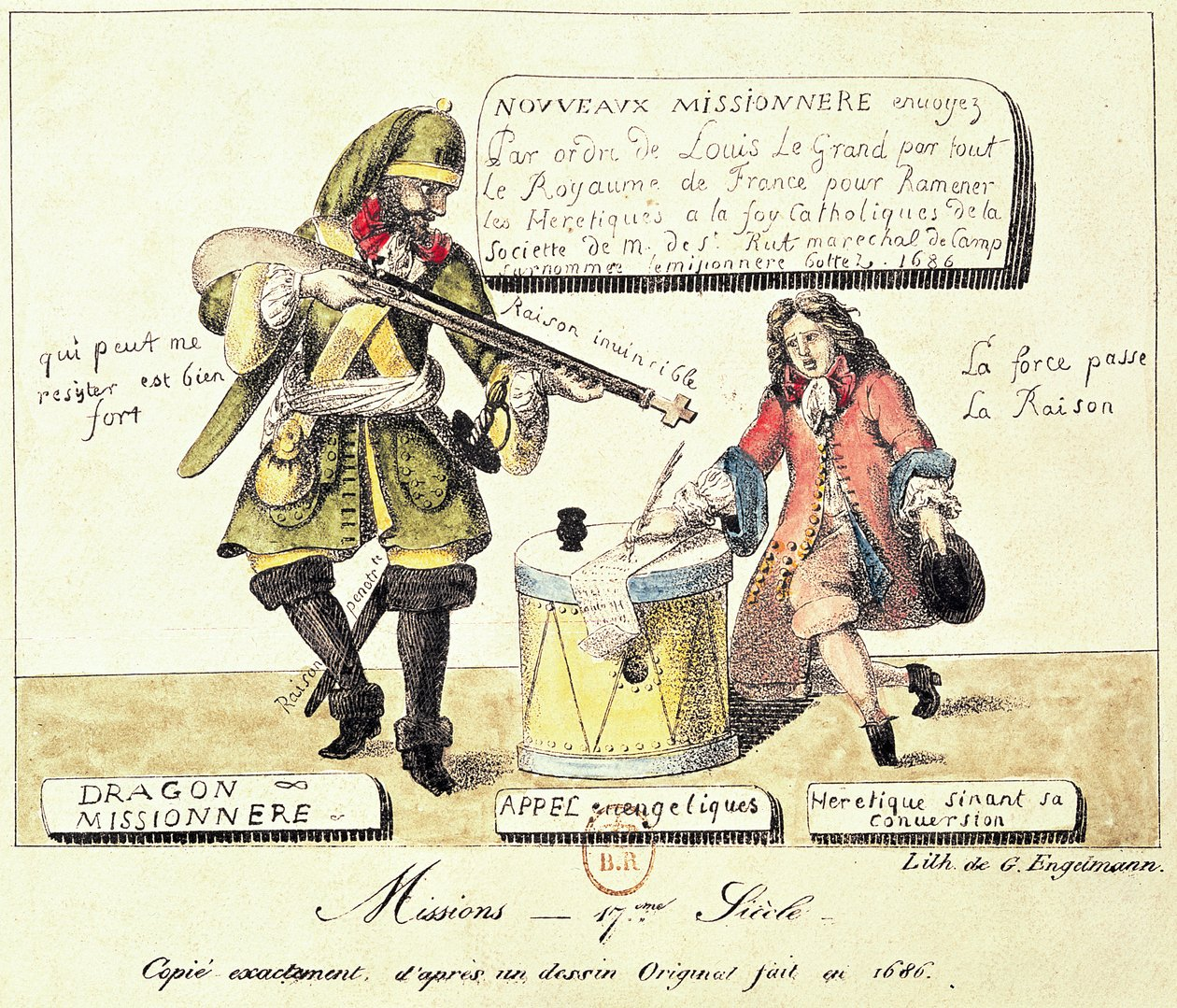
Protestant engraving representing 'les dragonnades' in France, instituted by Louis XIV in 1681.

Events from the year 1681 in France.

== Incumbents ==
- Monarch – Louis XIV

== Events ==
- 15 May – The Canal du Midi is opened officially, as the Canal Royal de Languedoc.
- 30 September – France annexes the city of Strasbourg, previously a free imperial city of the Holy Roman Empire.
- The Dragonnades are instituted to intimidate Huguenot families into either leaving France or converting to Catholicism. Collections are made in England for needy French refugees.
- The Port of Honfleur is remodelled by Abraham Duquesne.

== Births ==
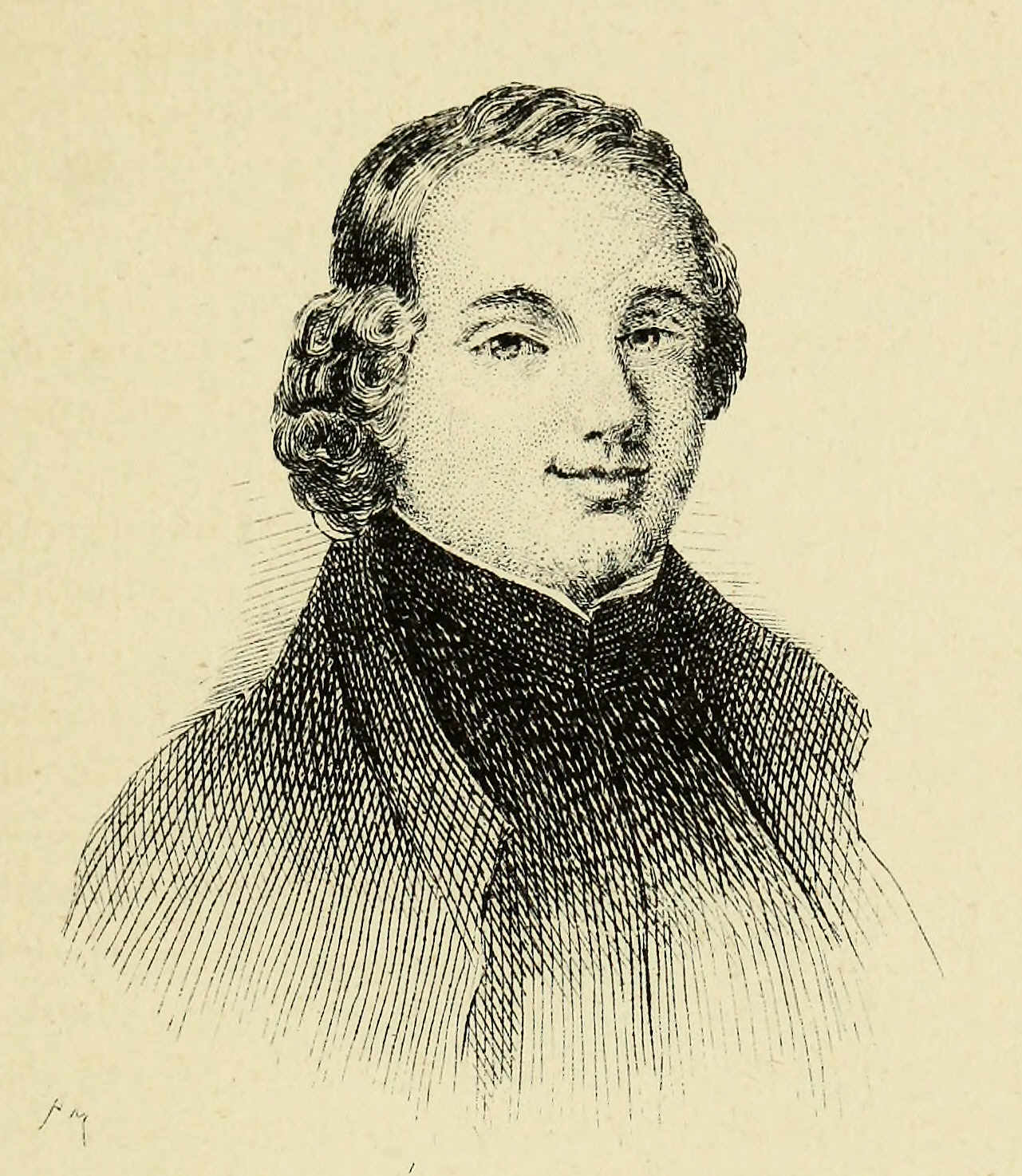
Joseph-François Lafitau

- 9 April – Nicolas Edelinck, engraver (d. 1767)
- 11 April – Anne Danican Philidor, musician (d. 1728)
- 26 May – Antoine-François Botot Dangeville, dancing master, dancer and ballet teacher (d. c.1737)
- 31 May – Joseph-François Lafitau, Jesuit missionary, ethnologist, and naturalist (d. 1746)
- 6 October – Charles François de Mondion, architect and military engineer (d. 1733)
- 19 October – Claude Bouhier de Lantenay, clergyman and the second bishop of Dijon (d. 1755)
- 7 November – Isaac-Joseph Berruyer, Jesuit historian (d. 1748)

=== Full date unknown ===
- Antoine Sartine, French-born financier and Spanish administrator (d. 1744)

== Deaths ==
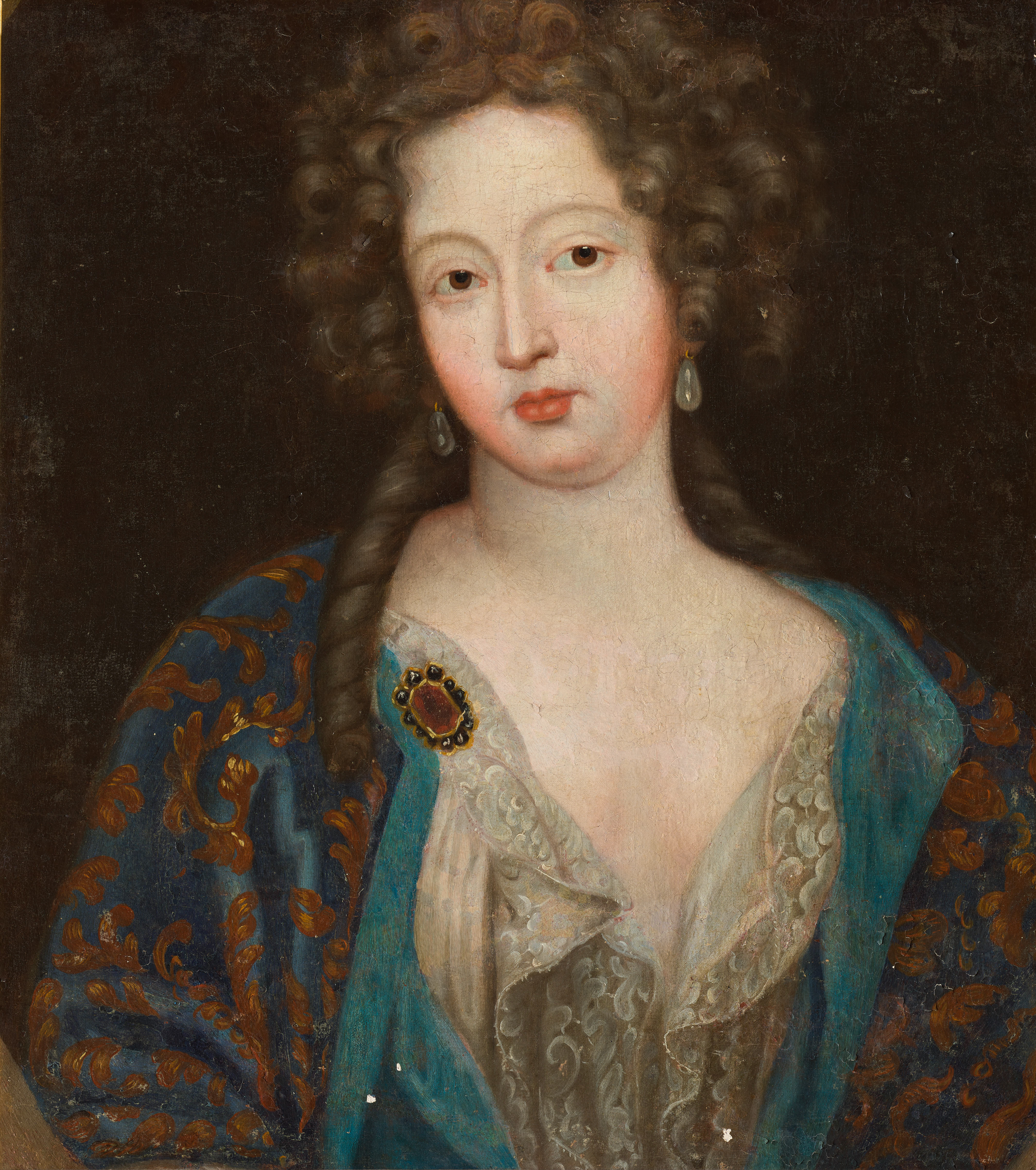
Marie Angélique de Scorailles

- 16 January – Olivier Patru, lawyer and writer (b. 1604)
- 24 January – Jean Baptiste Gonet, Dominican theologian (b. c.1616)
- 6 May – Catherine Trianon, fortune teller and accused poisoner in the Affair of the Poisons (b. 1627)
- 23 May – Claude Deschamps, actor and playwright (b. c.1600)
- 28 June – Marie Angélique de Scorailles, noblewoman (b. 1661)
- 15 September – Louise Marie Anne de Bourbon, illegitimate daughter of Louis XIV of France and his Maîtresse-en-titre, Madame de Montespan (b. 1674)
- 23 September – Pierre Simon Jaillot, sculptor (b. 1631)
- 27 September – Henri de La Ferté-Senneterre, marshal of France and governor of Lorraine (b. 1599)
- 26 November – Jean Garnier, Jesuit church historian, patristic scholar and moral theologian (b. 1612)
- 10 December – Gaspard Marsy, sculptor (b. 1624 or 1625)
- 16 December – François Vavasseur, Jesuit humanist and controversialist (b. 1605)
- 19 December – Marguerite Joly, accused poisoner in the Poison Affair, confessed under torture to several murders, sentenced to be burned at the stake (b. 1637)
- 21 December – Lacuzon, Franc-Comtois leader (b. 1607)

=== Full date unknown ===
- Laurent Drelincourt, theologian (b. 1626)
- Jacques Gaffarel, scholar and astrologer (b. 1601)
- Louis Phélypeaux, seigneur de La Vrillière, politician (b. 1598)
- Charles Joseph Tricassin, Capuchin theologian
- Pierre Guillaume Néel III, Huguenot (b. 1638)
- December – Charles Cotin, abbé, philosopher and poet (b. 1604)
- after 1681 – Abraham Ragueneau, painter (b. 1623)
