= 1678 in France =

- Decades: 1650s; 1660s; 1670s; 1680s; 1690s
- See also: History of France; Timeline of French history; List of years in France

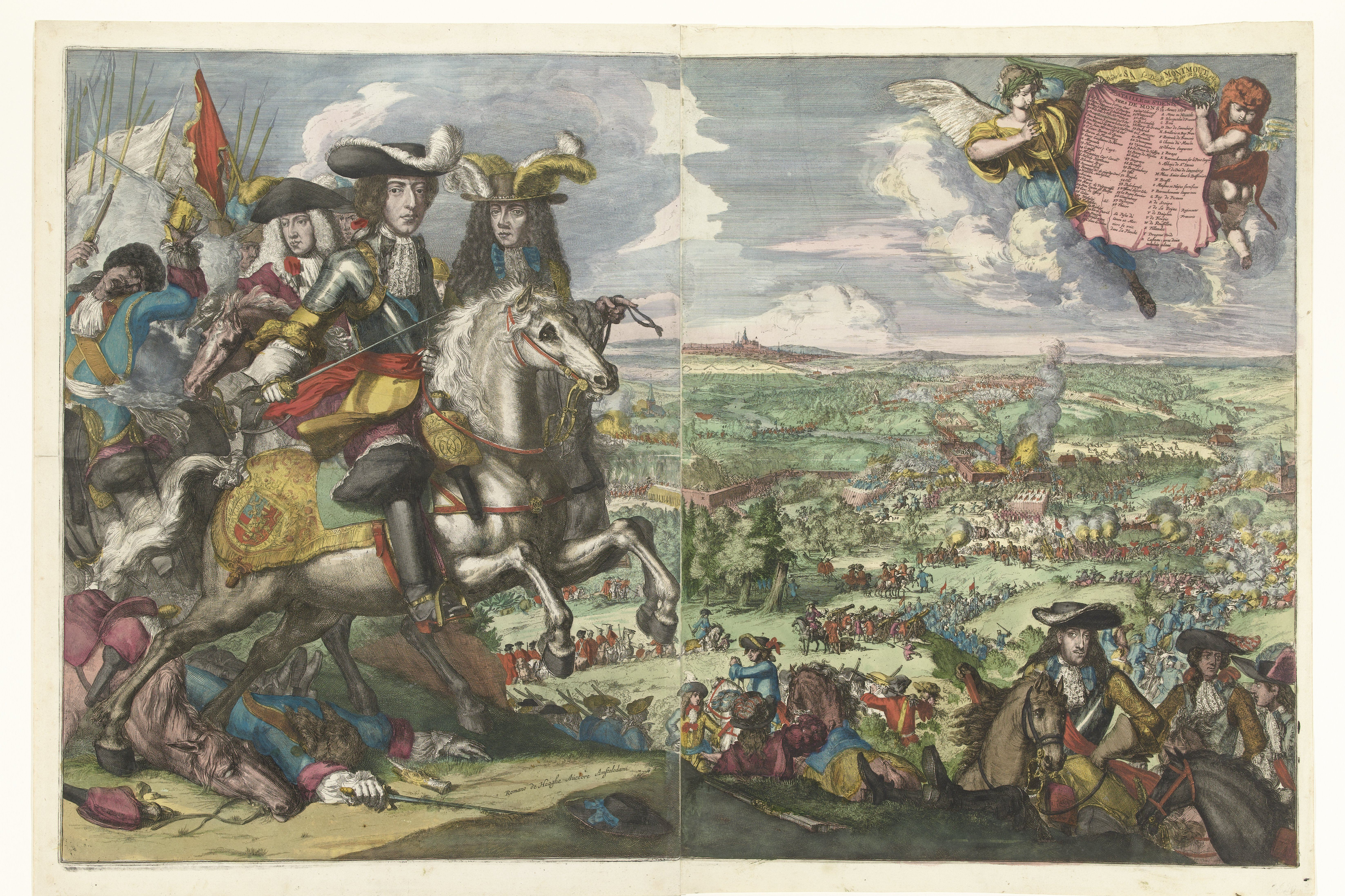
Battle of Saint-Denis by Romeyn de Hooghe.

Events from the year 1678 in France.

== Incumbents ==
- Monarch – Louis XIV

== Events ==
- 23 July – The Battle of Ortenbach, part of the Franco-Dutch War
- 14 August – The Battle of Saint-Denis, the last major action of the Franco-Dutch War
- August 1678 to December 1679 – The Treaties of Nijmegen, in the aftermath of the Franco-Dutch War of 1672–78

== Births ==
- 25 August – Jacques Caffieri, sculptor (d. 1755)

=== Full date unknown ===
- Augustin Lippi, botanist and physician (d. 1675)

== Deaths ==
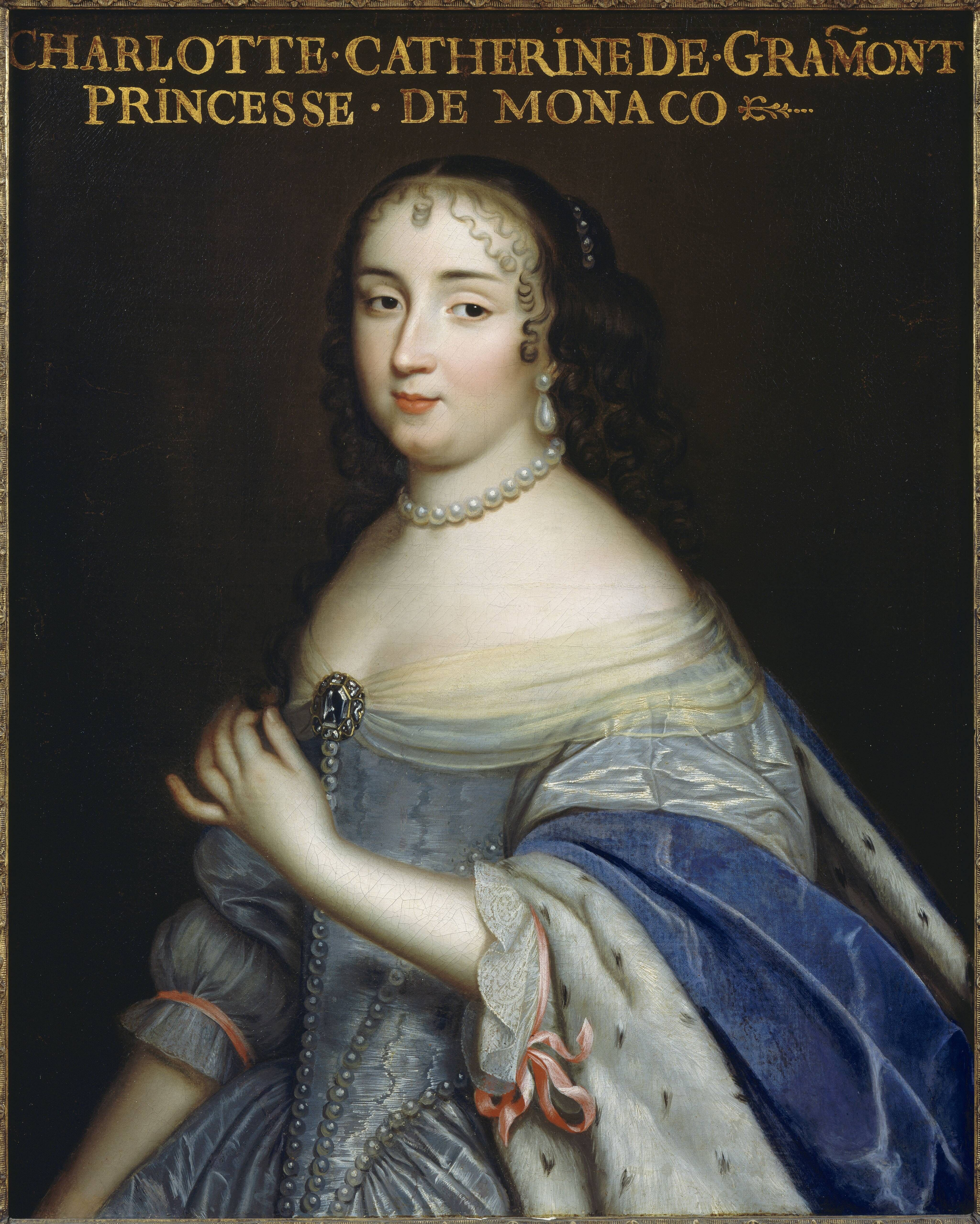
Catherine Charlotte de Gramont

- 16 January Madeleine de Souvré, marquise de Sablé, writer and salonnière (b. 1599)
- 4 June – Catherine Charlotte de Gramont, noblewoman and Princess of Monaco (b. 1639)

=== Full date unknown ===
- Jacques de Chevanes, polemicist (b. ca. 1608)
- Robert Desgabets, Cartesian philosopher and Benedictine prior (b. 1610)
- Gilles Guérin, sculptor (b. 1611)
