= Charles-Claude Genest =

French clergyman, poet and playwright

Charles-Claude Genest (17 October 1639 – 19 November 1719) was a French clergyman, poet and playwright. He was born and died in Paris.

== Works (selection) ==
- 1673: Ode de la science du salut,
- 1674: Poésies à la louange du Roy, Text on line
- 1684: Zélonide, princesse de Sparte
- 1684: Pénélope, ou le Retour d'Ulisse from the Trojan War pouvant servir de suite aux Aventure de Télémaque, tragedy in 5 acts, premiered 22 January Text online
- 1696: Épistre à M. D. L. B. [de La Bastide], sur son retour à la foi catholique, Text online
- 1701: Dialogues entre Messieurs Patru et d'Ablancourt, sur les plaisirs
- 1707: Dissertations sur la poésie pastorale, ou de l'Idylle et de l'églogue,
- 1711: Joseph vendu par ses frères, tragédie en cinq actes et en vers tirée de l'Écriture-Sainte, Text online
- 1712: Divertissements de Sceaux,
- 1716: Principes de philosophie, ou Preuves naturelles de l'existence de Dieu et de l'immortalité de l'âme, Text on line
- 1736: Les Voyageurs, comédie en 5 actes
