= 1682 in France =

- Decades: 1660s; 1670s; 1680s; 1690s; 1700s
- See also: History of France; Timeline of French history; List of years in France

Events from the year 1682 in France.

== Incumbents ==
- Monarch – Louis XIV

== Events ==
- Construction of the Canal de la Bruche started

== Births ==
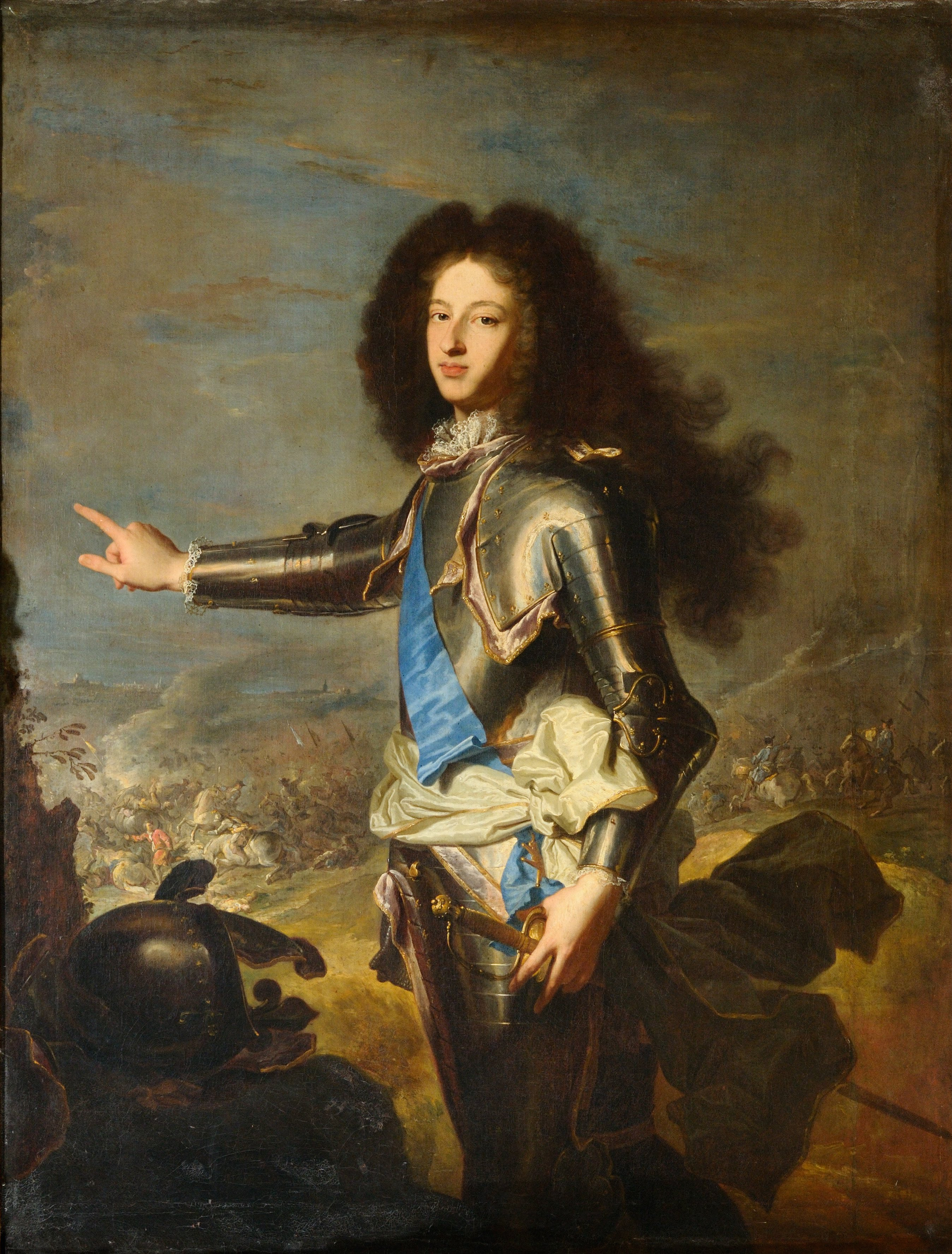
Louis, Duke of Burgundy

- 1 April – Pierre-Joseph Thoulier d'Olivet, abbot, writer, grammarian and translator (d. 1768)
- 27 April – Claudine Guérin de Tencin, salonist and author (d. 1749)
- 16 August – Louis, Duke of Burgundy, later Dauphin of France (d. 1712)

=== Full date unknown ===
- Marie-Anne Horthemels, engraver (d. 1727)
- Jean-Baptiste Francois des Marets, marquis de Maillebois, a Marshall of France (d. 1762)
- Claude Du Bosc, engraver (d. 1745?)

== Deaths ==
- 18 February – Pierre Dupuis, painter (b. 1610)
- 25 April – Ambroise Janvier, Benedictine and theologian (b. 1613)
- 28 May – Henri, Duke of Verneuil, bishop and diplomat (b. 1682)
- 24 August – Marie Charlotte de la Trémoille, noblewoman (b. 1632)
- 25 November – Antoine Bouzonnet-Stella, painter and printmaker (b. 1634)

=== Full date unknown ===
- Raymond Restaurand, physician (b. 1627)
