= Gonet =

Gonet is a surname, and may refer to:

- Jean Baptiste Gonet (c. 1616 – 1681), French Dominican theologian
- Stella Gonet (born 1963), Scottish theatre, film and TV actress

== Other uses ==
- GOnet, a system for physicians in Ontario, Canada, to send their medical billing to OHIP via dial-up modem
