= 1675 in France =

- Decades: 1650s; 1660s; 1670s; 1680s; 1690s
- See also: History of France; Timeline of French history; List of years in France

Events from the year 1675 in France.

== Incumbents ==
- Monarch – Louis XIV

== Events ==
- 5 January – Battle of Turckheim
- 30 March – The guild organisation Maîtresses couturières is founded in Paris.
- April to September – Revolt of the papier timbré
- 11 June – Treaty of Jaworów
- 27 August – The Strasbourg Agreement, first international agreement to ban use of chemical weapons

== Births ==
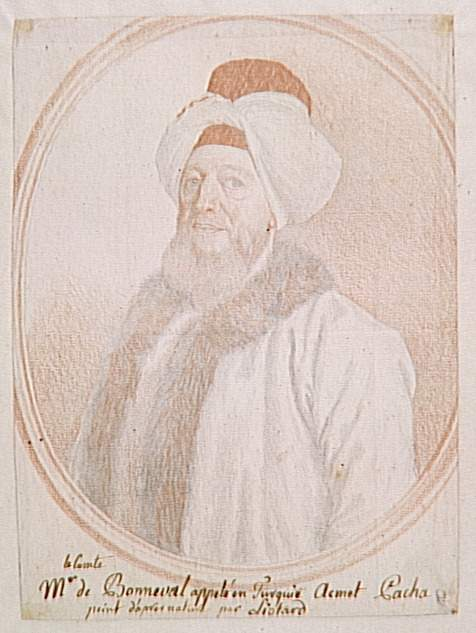
Claude Alexandre de Bonneval as Humbaracı Ahmet Paşa

=== Full date unknown ===
- Claude Alexandre de Bonneval, military officer, also known as Humbaracı Ahmet Paşa (died 1747)

== Deaths ==
=== Full date unknown ===
- Jean Ballesdens, lawyer and editor (born 1595)
- Gabriel de Rochechouart de Mortemart, nobleman (born 1600)
- Gilles de Roberval, mathematician (born 1602)
- Valentin Conrart, author (born 1603)
- Pierre Perrin, poet and librettist (born c.1620)
- Claude Lefèbvre, painter and engraver (born 1632)
- Bernard Frénicle de Bessy, mathematician (born c.1605)
