= Susan DuVerger =

English translator and author

- Born: Suzanne de La Vallée baptised in 1610; London
- Died: 1657
- Occupations: translator and writer
- Spouse: Jean-Jacques DuVerger
- Children: two

Susan DuVerger or Susan Du Verger born Suzanne de La Vallée (baptised in 1610 – 1657) was an English translator and author.

== Life ==
DuVerger was born in London and baptised in 1610. The baptismal records record that her parents were Charles and Ester de La Vallée and she was the last of their five children. The baptism took place at the French Huguenot church in Threadneedle Street. The Huguenots had arrived after 1598 and this church was one of their refuges. That church was destroyed in the Great Fire of London. The next record shows that by 1633 Suzanne de La Vallée was married to Jean-Jacques DuVerger as they had a daughter Françoise about this time; by 1635 she was joined by another daughter, Suzanne.

She would appear to be a Protestant, but in 1639 she was translating the works of the French writer and bishop Jean-Pierre Camus. Camus was a Catholic at a time when England was divided over this Christian sectarianism. The 1639 work was his romantic stories titled "Admirable Events" and she dedicated her translation to Henrietta Maria, Charles I of England's French Catholic wife. She translated another work by Camus titled "Diotrèphe" in 1641.

In 1657 DuVerger published the lengthily titled "Humble Reflections Upon some Passages of the right Honorable the Lady Marchionesse of Newcastles Olio. Or An Appeale from her mes-informed, to her owne better informed judgement". "Humble Reflections" was written in reply to "The World's Olio" which had been published by the noted and productive writer Margaret Cavendish, Duchess of Newcastle-upon-Tyne. Jane Collins in the ODNB calls DuVerger's work as "fascinating" and very unusual as it demonstrates an intellectual debate about religion between two women in the seventeenth century.

In 1659 her daughters were getting married in Canada. When they registered their marriages they named their mother as deceased.
