= 1679 in France =

- Decades: 1650s; 1660s; 1670s; 1680s; 1690s
- See also: History of France; Timeline of French history; List of years in France

Events from the year 1679 in France.

== Incumbents ==
- Monarch – Louis XIV

== Events ==
- Treaties of Nijmegen
- Treaty of Saint-Germain-en-Laye
- Treaty of Fontainebleau

== Births ==
=== Full date unknown ===
- Dominique Anel, surgeon (died 1730)
- George Psalmanazar, imposter and writer (died 1763)

== Deaths ==
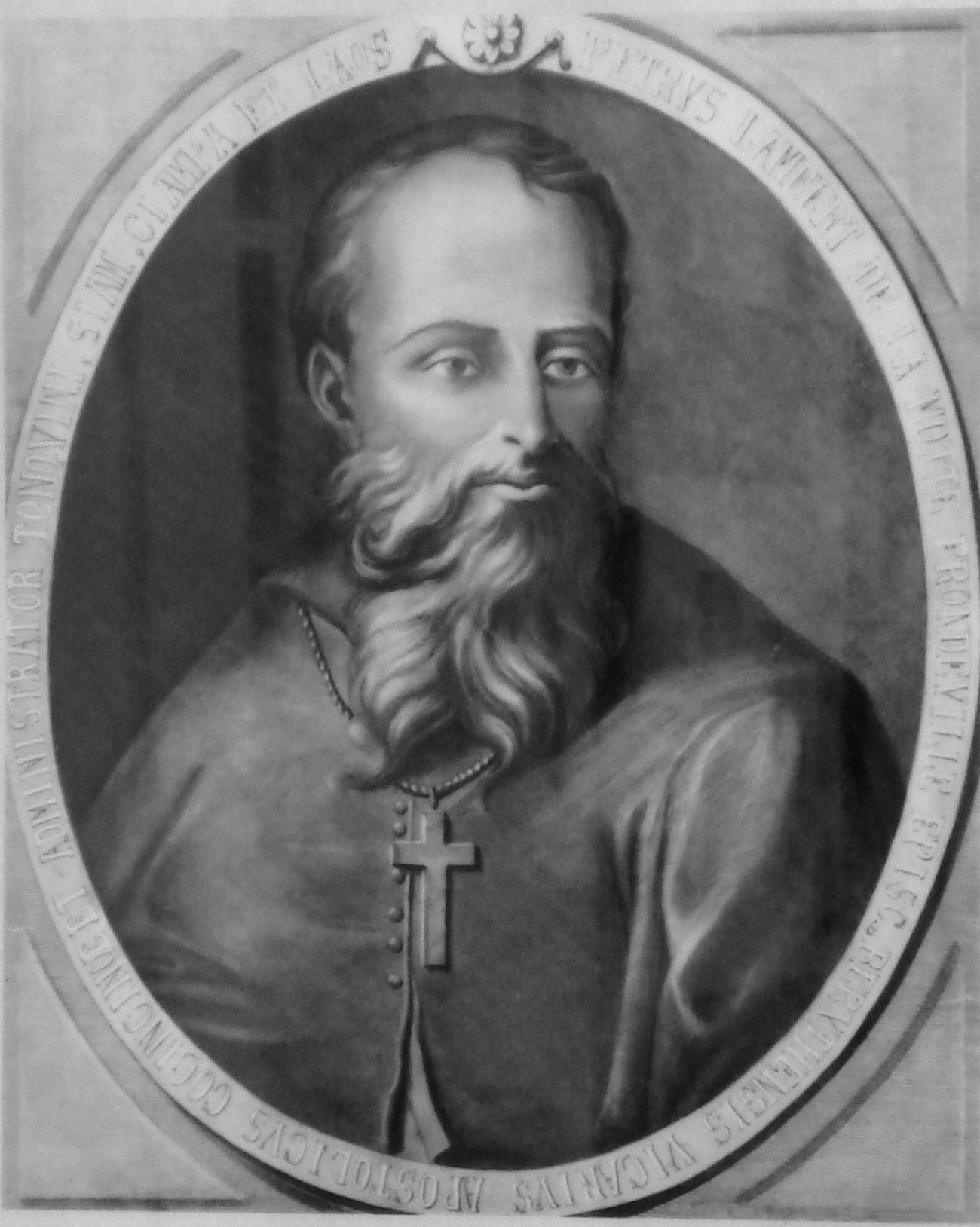
Pierre Lambert de la Motte

=== Full date unknown ===
- Marie de Rohan, aristocrat (born 1600)
- Jacques Cassagne, clergyman and poet (born 1636)
- Jacques de Billy, mathematician (born 1602)
- Pierre Lambert de la Motte, bishop (born 1624)
- Guillaume Courtois, painter (born 1628)
- Raymond Breton, Dominican missionary and linguist (born 1609)
- François Combefis, Dominican patrologist (born 1605)
