= Augustin Lippi =

Augustin Lippi (* 1678 in Paris; † November 10, 1705 in Sennar) was a French physician and botanist of Italian descent.

== Life and work ==
Augustin Lippi was born in 1678 in Paris. His parents came from the Italian town of Lucca. He studied medicine at the University of Paris and collected plants in Egypt.

In 1703, Fagon, superintendent of the King's garden, asked Lippi to join the Lenoir du Roule mission to Ethiopia to try to establish diplomatic ties with the Negus Yasous the Great.

In 1703, the French King Louis XIV planned on establishing trade relations and resuming missionary activity in the Kingdom of Ethiopia. A delegation was therefore to be sent to Ethiopian Negus Iyasu I. However, the French consul in Cairo, Benoît de Maillet, had been commissioned recently for the first time and shied away from the difficulty and danger of the trip. He in turn proposed the vice-consul of Damiette, Le Noir Du Roule (1665?-1705), to carry out the expedition.

Despite hostility to the mission from the Jesuits, the Franciscans and the Coptic Patriarch, a small group including Augustin Lippi left Cairo on July 9, 1704.

The group first traveled along the Nile to the city of Asyut (Assiut), reached Selfma oasis on October 3, and arrived at Moscho (Mushu) on October 18, where a long rest was taken.

At the end of May 1705, the delegation reached the town of Sennar on the Blue Nile in modern-day Sudan, ruled by the Funj Sultanate. Here the journey was repeatedly delayed. On November 10, 1705, as departing to Cairo, the six-person party was attacked on a square in Sennar. Five of the six (including Lippi) were murdered, and only one European survived.

== Dedication names ==
William Houston named the genus Lippia of the plant family Verbenaceae in Lippi's honor. Carl Linnaeus later renamed the plant after himself.

== Works ==
- Quaestio Medica: An ab ovo conceptus hominis? Paris, 1698
- Quaestio Medica: An cometa morborum proenuntius. Paris, 1699
- Quaestio Medica: An scorbutus aegritudo nova. Paris, 1699

== Sources ==
- Frédéric Cailliaud: Voyage à Meroë: au fleuve Blanc, au-delà de Fazoql dans le midi du royaume de Snnâr à Syouah tc. Paris (1823–27). Band 2, S. 303ff
- Joseph Pitton de Tournefort: Institutiones rei herbariae. Band 1, S. XXVI-XXXVII
- Jerónimo Lobo: Voyage historique d'Abissinie . Amsterdam, 1728
- Paul Belouino: Dictionnaire général et complet des persécutions souffertes par l'Église catholique. 1851. S. 58
- Haggai Erlich, Israel Gershoni (editor): The Nile Histories, Cultures, Myths. London, 2000. ISBN 1555876722
- E. A. Wallis Budge: The Egyptian Sudan: Its History and Monuments Part One. 2004. ISBN 1417977221
- Umberto Quattrocchi: CRC World Dictionary of Plant Names: Common Names, Scientific Names, Eponyms, Synonyms, and Etymology. CRC Press Inc., 2000, S. 1507. ISBN 0849326761
