= 1680 in France =

- Decades: 1660s; 1670s; 1680s; 1690s; 1700s
- See also: History of France; Timeline of French history; List of years in France

Events from the year 1680 in France.

== Incumbents ==
- Monarch: Louis XIV

== Events ==
- Chambers of Reunion (French courts under Louis XIV) decide on complete annexation of Alsace.

== Births ==
- 23 February – Jean-Baptiste Le Moyne de Bienville, French colonizer and Governor of Louisiana (d. 1767)
- 9 April – Philippe Néricault Destouches, French dramatist (d. 1754)

== Deaths ==
- 22 February – Catherine Monvoisin, French sorceress (b. c. 1607)
- 14 March – René Le Bossu, French critic (b. 1631)
- 17 March – François de La Rochefoucauld, French writer (b. 1613)
- 23 March – Nicolas Fouquet, French statesman (b. 1615)

=== Full date unknown ===
- Marie Meurdrac, French chemist and alchemist (b. 1610)
