= Jean-Pierre Camus =

French bishop, preacher, and author of works of fiction and spirituality

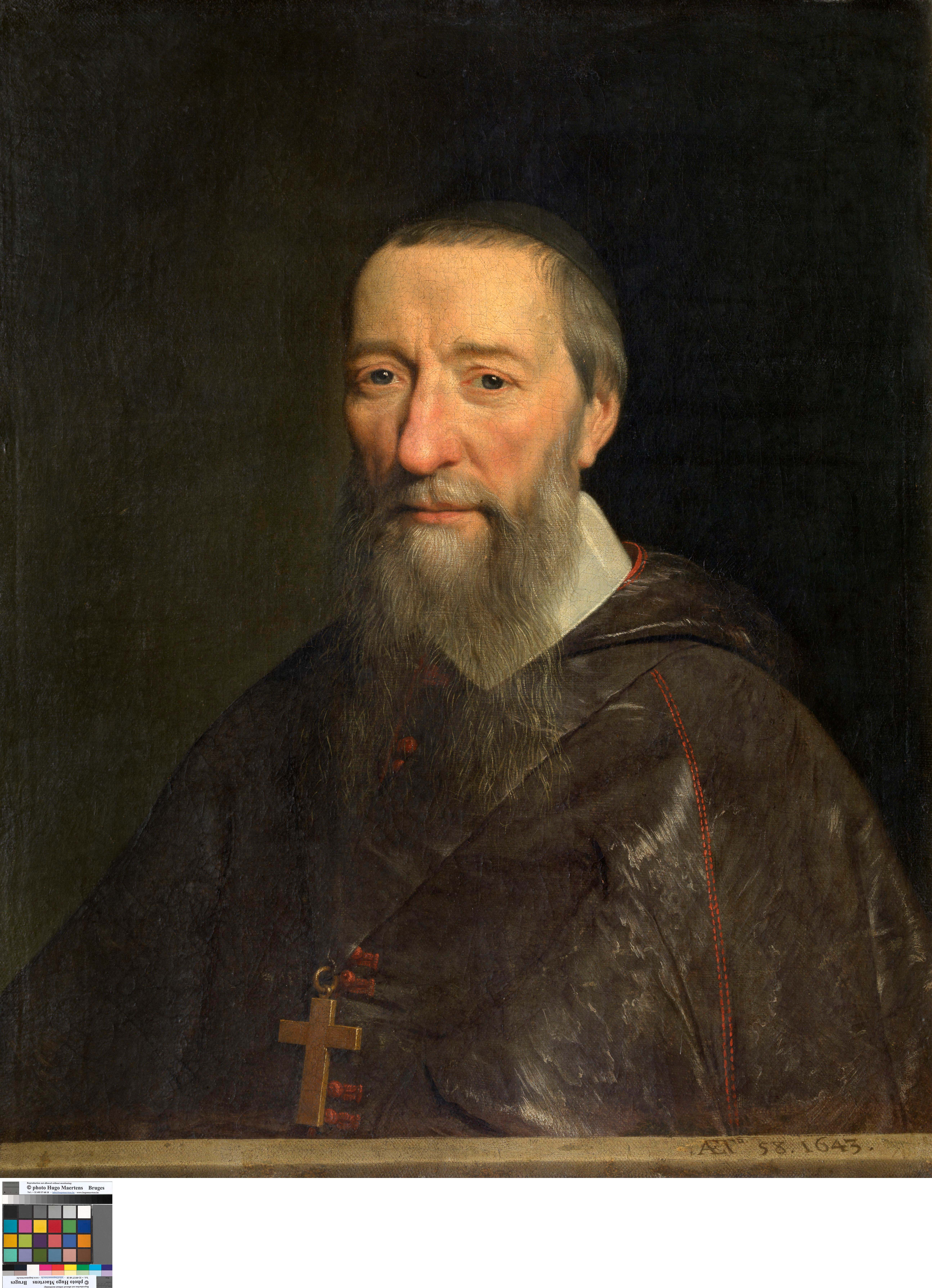
Portrait of Jean Pierre Camus by Philippe de Champaigne.

Jean-Pierre Camus (November 3, 1584 – April 26, 1652) was a French bishop, preacher, and author of works of fiction and spirituality.

== Biography ==
Jean-Pierre Camus was born in Paris in 1584, the son of Jean Camus, seigneur de Saint Bonnet, who was governor of Étampes. As a young man he traveled about Europe, and following his theological studies he became a priest in 1608, and subsequently, a renowned preacher in Paris. Two years later Henry IV appointed him bishop of Belley (1609–1628), which required a dispensation from Pope Paul V as Camus was only twenty-six.

In 1609, Camus was consecrated bishop by the Bishop of Geneva, François de Sales. The two dioceses of Geneva and Belley bordered one another, which contributed to further that close friendship between the Bishops. Camus consulting the elder cleric in all important questions, and subsequently became a friend and disciple. He was by nature ardent and imaginative, also impetuous and excitable; and thus strove to emulate the calm gentleness characteristic of his mentor, an effort in which he did not always succeed. Nonetheless, in 1619, de Sales recommended Camus as spiritual director to Louise de Marillac.

The Bishop of Geneva was not content with receiving Camus at Annecy, but often went to Belley where he would spend several days in his company. During these visits they would discuss any difficulties that may have arisen, and encouraged each other in their ministries.

After the death of François de Sales, Camus remained in Belley for a five more years, and then resigned his post in 1628. He was briefly given a position at the Abbey of Aunay in 1629, and subsequently performed other duties for the archbishop of Rouen. In the last years of his life, he consecrated himself to working with the poor in Paris. In 1652, he was appointed bishop of Arras, but died shortly thereafter.

He was buried in the chapel of the Hospice des Incurables, at Paris.

== Preaching ==
Camus gave three speeches at the États-Généraux of 1614. As an orator, Camus was a product of the 17th century Baroque school of preaching. In form, he believed the sermon should exude good literary style, including ample illustrations and vivid examples designed to entertain the audience. In content, Camus' preaching focused primarily on doctrinal instruction, such as the defense of the Catholic doctrine of the Eucharist against that of the Protestants. His sermons occasionally took the form of moral exhortation - which foreshadowed the practice of later Neoclassical preachers - and drew on the lives of the saints as moral exemplars, of whom Charles Borromeo and Ignatius of Loyola were favorite of his.

== Works ==
Jean-Pierre Camus was one of the most prolific authors of the period 1620-1648. His prose is succinct, without the elaborate rhetoric of authors—such as Antoine de Nervèze—from the previous generation. He also shows a vast knowledge of poetry.

Camus's first works were strongly influenced by the Essays of Michel de Montaigne, albeit with more religious content. His spiritual works were directly inspired by François de Sales; he was critical of mendicant orders and wrote extensively on poverty, grace and spiritual reflection. His criticism led him into controversy with Jacques de Chevanes.

His fictional works encompass both novels and short stories. His first "devout novel", La Memoire de Darie is a fictionalized account of the life of Marie-Aimeé de Chantal, the wife of Francis' youngest brother, Bernard de Sale. His dark and violent stories, often based on contemporary anecdotes or criminal incidents (he wrote over 1000 such works) were in the tradition of the horrific tales ("histoires tragiques") of Matteo Bandello, popular in France in the late Renaissance and early seventeenth century. His longer works show the influence of ancient Greek novels (such as the works of Heliodorus of Emesa and Achilles Tatius), with their scenes of tempests and kidnappings. Much of his fiction has a moralistic intention, showing human folly, the unruliness of passions, the dangers of illicit love, and the saving grace of divine love. The 1631 La tour des miroirs shows the effects of vanity using a series of enchanted mirrors.

Admirable Events and Diotrèphe were translations of his work into English by Susan DuVerger in 1639 and 1641 respectively.
