= 1677 in France =

- Decades: 1650s; 1660s; 1670s; 1680s; 1690s
- See also: History of France; Timeline of French history; List of years in France

Events from the year 1677 in France.

== Incumbents ==
- Monarch: Louis XIV

== Events ==
- January 1 – Jean Racine's tragedy Phèdre is first performed.
- August – The guild of the Maitresses bouquetieres is founded in Paris.
- October 29 – Michel le Tellier becomes chancellor of France.
- November 16 – French troops occupy Freiburg.
- Jules Hardouin Mansart begins la place Vendôme in Paris (completed in 1698).
- End of the use of male impotence as a factor in French divorce proceedings.
- Ice cream becomes popular in Paris.
- The population of Paris first exceeds 500,000.

== Births ==
- February 8 – Jacques Cassini, French astronomer (d. 1756)
- May 4 – Françoise-Marie de Bourbon, youngest daughter of Louis XIV and Madame de Montespan, wife of Philippe d'Orléans, le Régent (d.1749)
