= 1676 in France =

- Decades: 1650s; 1660s; 1670s; 1680s; 1690s
- See also: History of France; Timeline of French history; List of years in France

Events from the year 1676 in France.

== Incumbents ==
- Monarch – Louis XIV

== Events ==
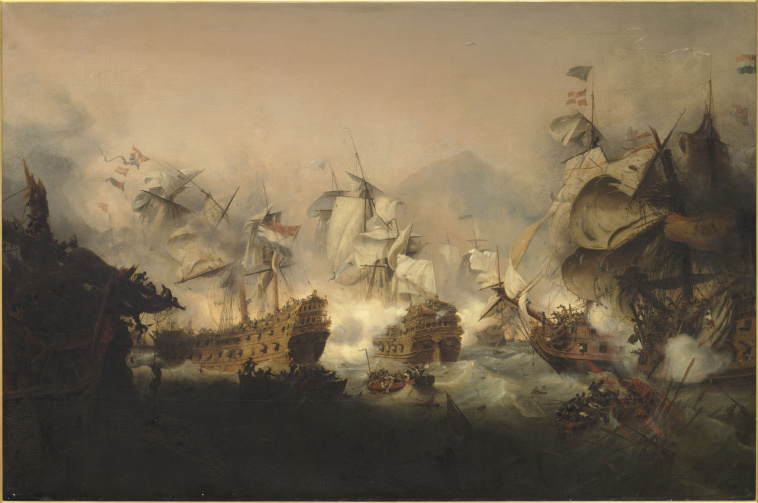
Battle of Augusta

- 8 January – Battle of Stromboli, part of the Franco-Dutch War (1672–1678)
- 22 April – Battle of Augusta, part of the Franco-Dutch War
- 2 June – Battle of Palermo, part of the Franco-Dutch War

== Births ==
- 13 September – Élisabeth Charlotte d'Orléans, duchess (died 1744)

== Deaths ==
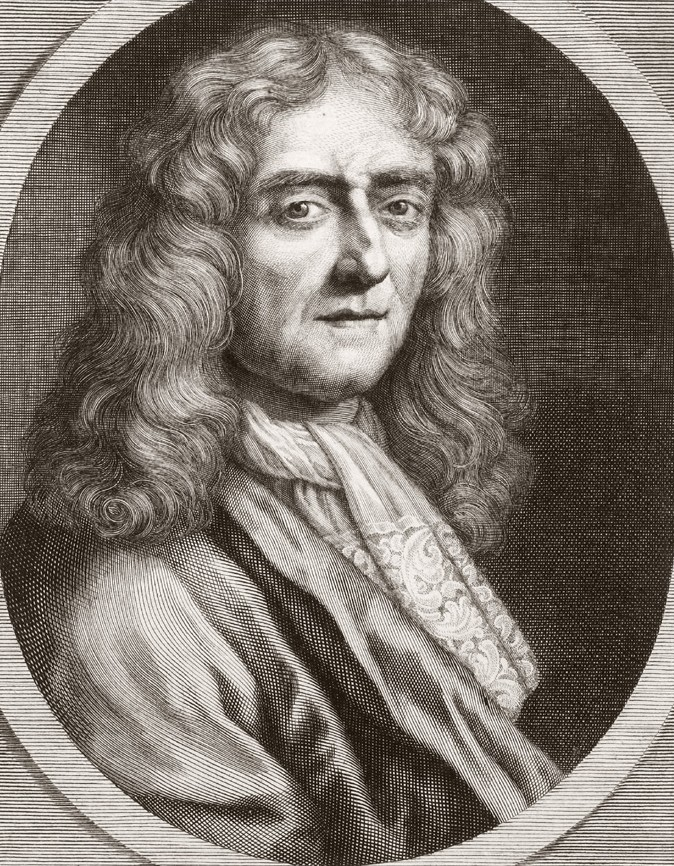
Jean Desmarets

- 14 February – Abraham Bosse, artist (born c.1602 – 1604)
- 5 August – Pierre Patel, painter (born 1605)
- 9 September – Paul de Chomedey, Sieur de Maisonneuve, military officer (born 1612)
- 28 October – Jean Desmarets, writer and dramatist (born 1595)
- Full date unknown – Isaac La Peyrère, theologian (born 1594 or 1596)
