= Fagon =

Fagon is a surname. Notable with the surname include:

- Alfred Fagon (1937–1986), Jamaican-born playwright, poet, and actor
- Guy-Crescent Fagon (1638–1718), French physician and botanist

== See also ==
- Alfred Fagon Award
- Fagan
