= Jacques de Chevanes =

Jacques de Chevanes (c.1608 – 1678) was a French Capuchin polemicist. He used the pseudonyms Jacques d'Autun and Saint-Agran.

He was the son of Nicolas de Chevanes of Autun, and brother of the jurist Jacques-Auguste de Chevanes.

== L'incrédulité sçavante et la crédulité ignorante ==
L'incrédulité sçavante et la crédulité ignorante: au sujet des au sujet des magiciens et des sorciers (1671) was a reply to Gabriel Naudé's Apologie pour tous les grands personnages, qui ont été faussement soupçonnés de magie. This work argues against both freethought and popular misconceptions.

It cites the author's personal experience during a witch-hunt in Burgundy in 1648/9. It also references a 1670 interview with a woman accused of sorcery and witchcraft. Chevanes quotes De civitate Dei book 15 on demonology.

It was addressed to the Parlement of Dijon, and was written largely from a legalistic point of view, though with lengthy digressions, for example on astrology. Lynn Thorndike suggests that its title may derive from the English anti-sceptical work On Credulity and Incredulity in Things natural, civil and divine (1668) by Méric Casaubon The appearance of this work has been noted as a milestone for the French judicial attitude; it asserted that there were witches, but few of them.

The work also moves to a general conclusion on the occult, namely that while it should be avoided for reasons already given by the Church Fathers, its practitioners should not be executed.

== Other works ==
- Les Entretiens curieux d'Hermadore et du voyageur incognu (1634); defence of the regular clergy, against Jean-Pierre Camus
- La conduite des illustres pour aspirer à la gloire d'une vie héroïque (1639)
- Les Justes Espérances de nostre salut (1649)
- Funeral oration for the Duc de Candale (1658)
- L'amour eucharistique victorieux des impossibilitez de la nature et de la morale (1666)
- La vie de Saint François d'Assise, patriarche des frères Mineurs (1676)
