= Raymond Restaurand =

French physician

Raymond Restaurand (1627–1682) was a French physician born in Pont-Saint-Esprit, Languedoc, France. Restaurand published numerous works, sometimes in the form of pamphlets, discussing medicine and its history. Some of his topics included commentaries on ancient philosophers and practitioners such as Hippocrates.
