= Charles Joseph Tricassin =

French Capuchin theologian

Charles Joseph Tricassin (Tricassinus) (b. at Troyes; d. in 1681) was a French Capuchin theologian. There is little information about his life.

== Works ==
He expounded Augustine of Hippo's doctrine of grace against the Jansenists. Thesee writings were violently attacked; they treat exhaustively both the Augustinian doctrine and that of Bonaventure. They comprise in the main:

- De praedestinatione hominum ad gloriam (Paris, 1669 and 1673), to which was added Supplementum Augustinianum (1673), the work being intended to prove predestination for foreknown merits;
- De indifferenti lapsi hominis arbitrio sub gratia et concupiscentia (Paris, 1673), a thorough explanation of Augustinian tenets;
- De necessaria ad salutem gratia omnibus et singulis data (Paris, 1673), proof of the sufficient grace for every individual, with special emphasis on difficult passages in Augustine's writings;
- De natura peccati originalis (Paris, 1677);
- De causa bonorum operum (Paris, 1679), a proof of the virtue of the hope of eternal life and of the fear of hell; a Supplementum (Paris, 1679) shows that attrition in connection with the Sacrament of Penance is sufficient according to Augustine and the Council of Trent.

Tricassin also published a commentary to several of Augustine's works to prove that Augustine calls the Pelagians heretical teachers, because they do not concede any necessity of grace for the will. He published at Paris in 1678 a French translation with explanations and applications of Augustine's books, De gratia et libero arbitrio, De correptione et gratia, as well as a treatise arguing that the Cartesian philosophy was contrary to the Catholic faith.
