= Joseph-François Lafitau =

French Jesuit missionary, ethnologist, and naturalist (1681–1746)

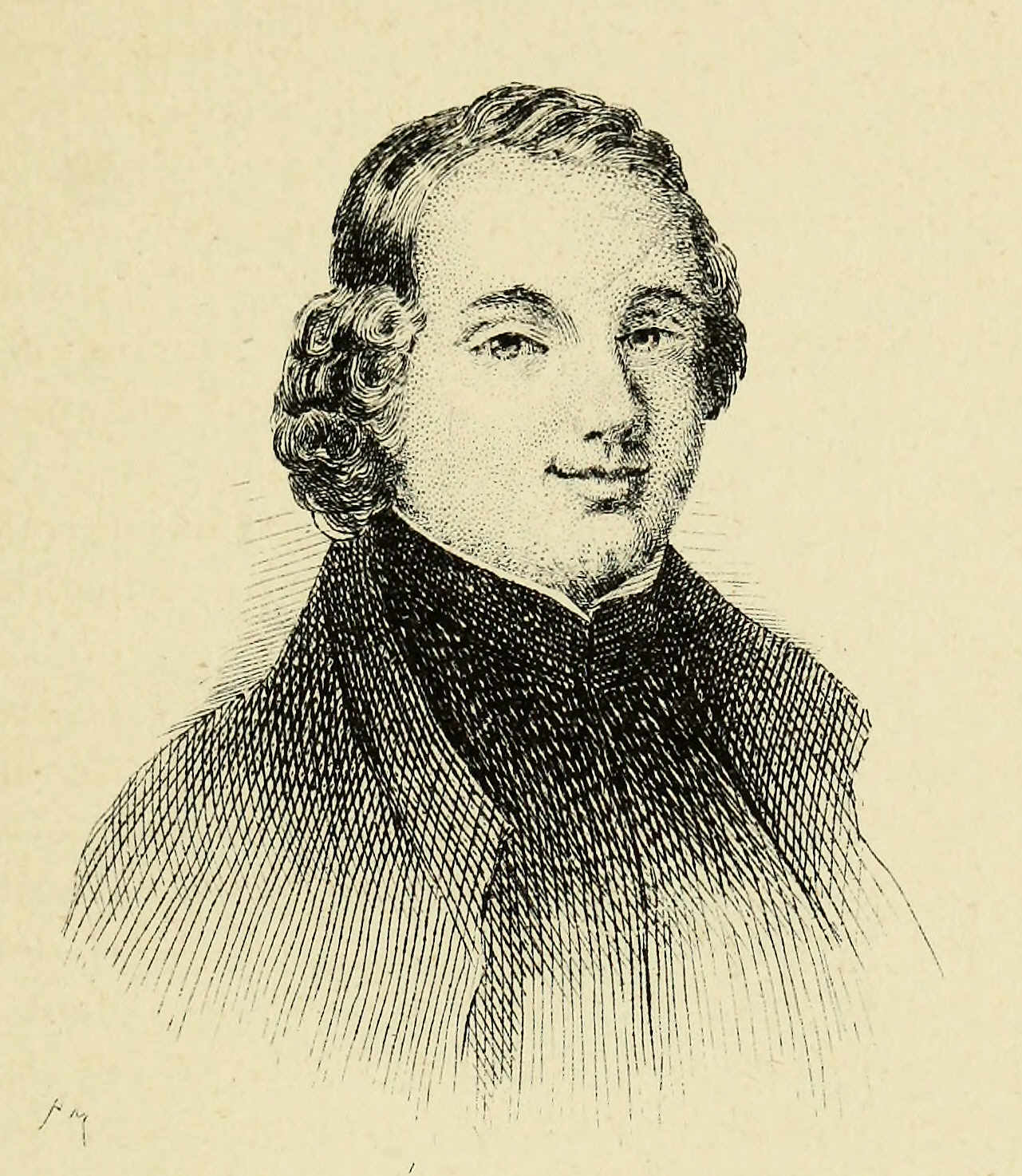
- Born: May 31, 1681; Bordeaux
- Died: July 3, 1746 (aged 65); Bordeaux
- Known for: French Jesuit missionary, ethnologist, naturalist
- Notable work: Moeurs des Sauvages Amériquains, Comparées aux Moeurs des Premiers Temps, Histoire de Jean de Brienne, Roy de Jérusalem et Empereur de Constantinople, Histoire des découvertes et conquestes des Portugais dans le Nouveau Monde, Mémoire...concernant la précieuse plante du gin-seng

Joseph-François Lafitau (French: [lafito]; May 31, 1681 – July 3, 1746) was a French Jesuit missionary, ethnologist, and naturalist who worked in Canada. He is best known for his use of the comparative method in the field of scientific anthropology, the discovery of American ginseng, and his writings on the Iroquois. Lafitau was the first of the Jesuit missionaries in Canada to have a scientific point of view. Francis Parkman praises Lafitau, stating, "none of the old writers are so satisfactory as Lafitau."

He is best known as the author of Customs of the American Indians Compared with the Customs of Primitive Times (1724).

== Early years ==
Lafitau was born in Bordeaux on May 31, 1681, to Jean Lafitau and Radegonde Bercambois (or Berckembos, of Flemish origin). He died there on July 3, 1746. Growing up in the port city of Bordeaux, Lafitau gained an interest in the French empire at a young age. Although his father was a wealthy merchant and banker among the elite of Huguenot Protestantism, the Lafitau family remained strong Catholics. His younger brother, Pierre-François (1685–1764), followed Lafitau into the Jesuit order and later became the Bishop of Sisteron. Lafitau was able to gain access to books and the opportunity to study and learn many languages as a result of his family's wealth and resources. He was familiar with important French, Spanish and English voyages, as well as ancient literature, philosophy, theology, geography, and natural history. Lafitau had access to these sources through his education, and this is evident in his writing – in which he frequently makes reference to them. Since the Society of Jesus offered a path to higher education in France, Lafitau joined the Jesuits at Bordeaux at fifteen. Following his novitiate, he studied rhetoric and philosophy at Pau between 1699 and 1701. He then taught humanities and rhetoric at Limoges, Saintes and Pau, before returning to his studies at Poitiers and La Fleche from 1706 to 1709. He finished his studies in theology at the College of Louis-le-Grand in Paris in 1710. It was the next year, in April 1711, that Father General Tamburini granted him permission to leave at the end of the year in order to join the Iroquois mission in Canada, where he remained as a missionary for nearly six years.

== Work on the Iroquois in Sault St. Louis ==
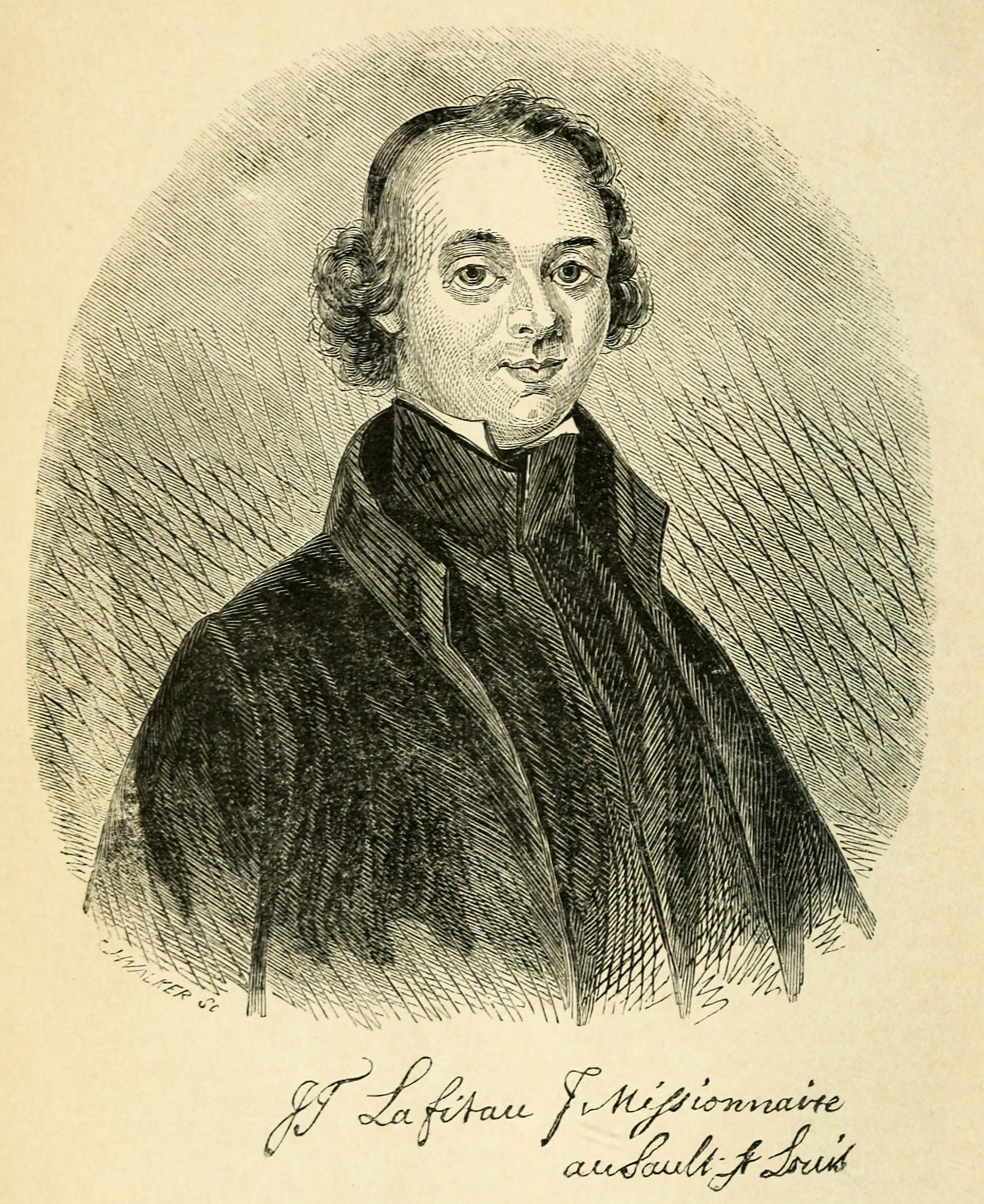
Reverend Joseph-François Lafitau, engraving of 1858 by Walker

Lafitau is best known for his important discoveries on the Iroquois society. He arrived in Quebec in 1711 amidst a period of hostility between the Five Nations prior to the signing of the Treaty of Utrecht. The woods were deemed unsafe for travelers and therefore he was ordered to join the Iroquois on the south shore of the St. Lawrence valley in Sault St. Louis, also known as Kahnawake. Sault St. Louis already shared a great tradition with both the members of his order and the Iroquois by the time Lafitau arrived. Lafitau was mentored by fellow missionary Julien Garnier, who was his guide in both the Iroquois language and culture.

He noticed the importance of women in Iroquois society, the universality of marriage as an institution, age grading, the classificatory system of relationship, and the pulse of Indian politics in the town council. Lafitau also contributed to existing scholarship on the Iroquois long-house; he details the rules of residence and social organization. Lafitau's observations provide a greater understanding of Iroquois kinship and exogamy.

== Comparative methodology ==
Lafitau is considered the first of the modern ethnographers and a precursor of scientific ethnology for his work on the Iroquois. He developed a model of studying peoples that involved describing existing cultures on their own terms—not in comparison to European society. He distinguished generic and specific traits, transforming the "generic savage" into specific tribal groups. He explained that "only from specific identities can genetic relations be inferred."

=== Presuppositions ===
Lafitau's comparative method (method of reciprocal illumination) rests on his "system" which is a compendium of his theoretical presupposition. He believed that man was created equal by God and was given a set of divine moral principles. These principles were gradually violated due to the inherited sinfulness of man—a consequence of the penalty of Original Sin. All men originally shared one religion with one God but over time people migrated to separate margins of the earth where they then lost touch with the values and traditions of this one "true religion" and culture. Therefore, Lafitau believed in the "psychic unity of mankind" and the doctrine of primitive monotheism. Lafitau strove to find traces of this degenerated "true faith", of which Christianity was the highest form, among the Native Americans.

Lafitau's version of these theories differed from that of his predecessors and contemporaries. Pierre Daniel Huet, for example, believed that the pagan gods and goddesses dated back to Moses and Zipporah. Lafitau was aware of this and he mentions Huet in his work. Nevertheless, for Lafitau, this theory was flawed and vulnerable to the attacks of the atheists who claimed that religion was the invention of man and the work of politics. If Christianity originated from Moses, then all the peoples before this time would have had pagan religions, religions that were older than Christianity. This would further imply that there is no one underlining religion whose traces can be found in all the peoples of the world. This, which goes against Lafitau's "system", would make it possible for atheists to attack the Christianity's claim of being the "one true religion". Lafitau strove to find these traces of degenerated faith in a hope of proving his theory of unitary faith and unitary humanity.

=== Stages of development ===
Lafitau believed that all cultures change over time, and that they will eventually reach the European level of civility. The Native Americans, according to him, were at a lower stage of development than the Europeans. They were at the same stage as the peoples of the Ancient Times, hence their customs could be juxtaposed with the disregard of time and place. This is the basis out of which his method emerges. What sets Lafitau apart from his predecessors and contemporaries, was the formulation of his method of reciprocal illumination. By juxtaposing one type of behavior, or a set of beliefs and customs, to those of other cultures who have reached the same level of developmental history, their similarities and differences would reveal information about both.

For example, Lafitau describes the process of making celts by Native Americans, i.e. crude axes, by rubbing flint and rock against abrasive sandstone. This empirical information can then be juxtaposed against the European belief that relics similar to those were "thunder stones" deposited by bolts of lightning. Based on the empirical knowledge it can be extrapolated that the "thunder stones" were not deposited by lightning, rather they were made and used by the Gallic hunters, much in the same way as Native Americans use Celts. In Lafitau's words:

I have not limited myself to learning the characteristics of the Indian and informing myself about their customs, vestiges of the most remote antiquity. I have read carefully [the works] of the earliest authors who treated the customs, laws, and usages of the peoples of whom they had some knowledge. I have made a comparison of these customs with each other. I confess that, if the ancient authors have given me information on which to base happy conjectures about the Indians, the customs of the Indians have given me information on the basis of which I can understand more easily and explain more readily many things in the ancient authors.

=== Symbolic Theology ===
According to Anthony Pagden, Lafitau argued for the possibility of translating all human behavior, especially religious, into a language which he called "Symbolic Theology", which would explain the universal cultural patterns such as marriage, government and religion. To achieve this, Lafitau emphasized the factual account of the evidence. By using field observations of the "savage" (Lafitau's contemporary "savage"), he would compare them to the historical sources, on the peoples from antiquity. In so doing, Lafitau strove to reveal an underlining cultural pattern; a universal human culture and universal human system of belief. In short, Lafitau wanted to establish the "science of manners and customs".

Comparing Native American customs to those of the Ancients was a rhetorical strategy that was used for centuries before Lafitau, and as late as the 19th century. The Ancients, as well as people from the Bible, served as a source of anthropological knowledge, and as a model of admirable humanity. It was used to create a more favorable image of alien peoples by comparing them to the "wise and enlightened" Ancients. The outlandish characteristics and customs of the Native Americans, when compared to similar, sometimes just as strange, costumes of the Ancients, would then become more acceptable. It would familiarize and elevate the image of the Native Americans by making them share in the qualities of the cultures that were still held in high esteem among the Europeans. For example, when describing Iroquois chieftains names, Lafitau warns that names such as Hoghouaho (the Great Wolf) or Hoskereouak (the Great Bear), might sound strange to his fellow Europeans, however, he points out that in antiquity people's names were names of divinities, and they, in turn, were names of animals as well. In short, the comparative method made the strange custom more familiar and the "savage" more human.

=== Importance of Lafitau's contribution ===
Lafitau is remembered for applying the comparative method with a greater level of competency than any of his contemporaries. Through original field observations, he was able to critique the works of earlier writers on Primitive peoples. By using the Comparative Method, Lafitau rejected all theories of social and cultural change and instead used his study to demonstrate the similarities in customs, practices, and usages of the Native North Americans with diverse peoples from different continents and centuries.

== Discovery of ginseng ==
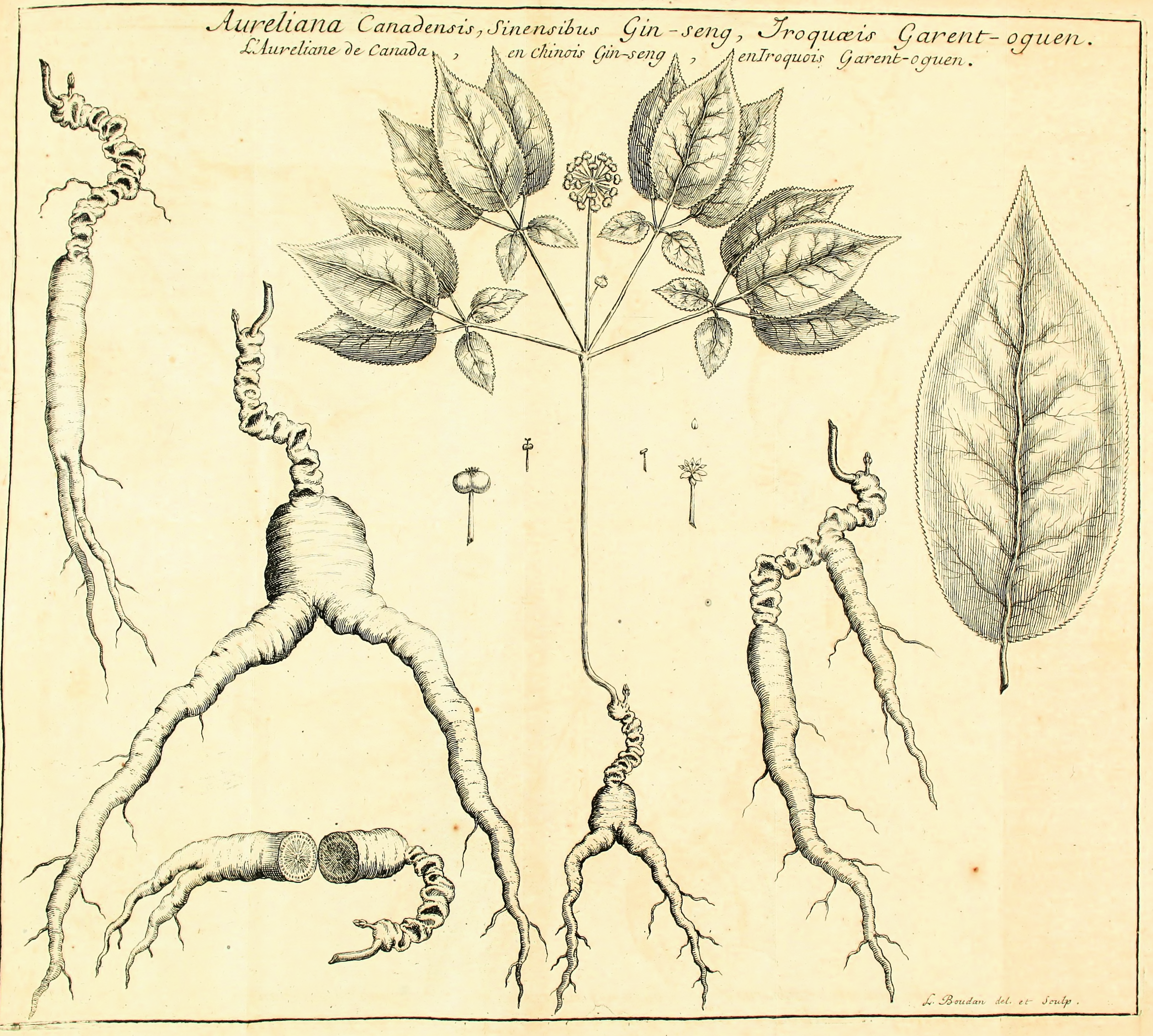
Canadian ginseng, in Chinese gin-seng, in Mohawk garent-oguen: L'aureliana de Canada, en chinois gin-seng, en iroquois garent-oguen

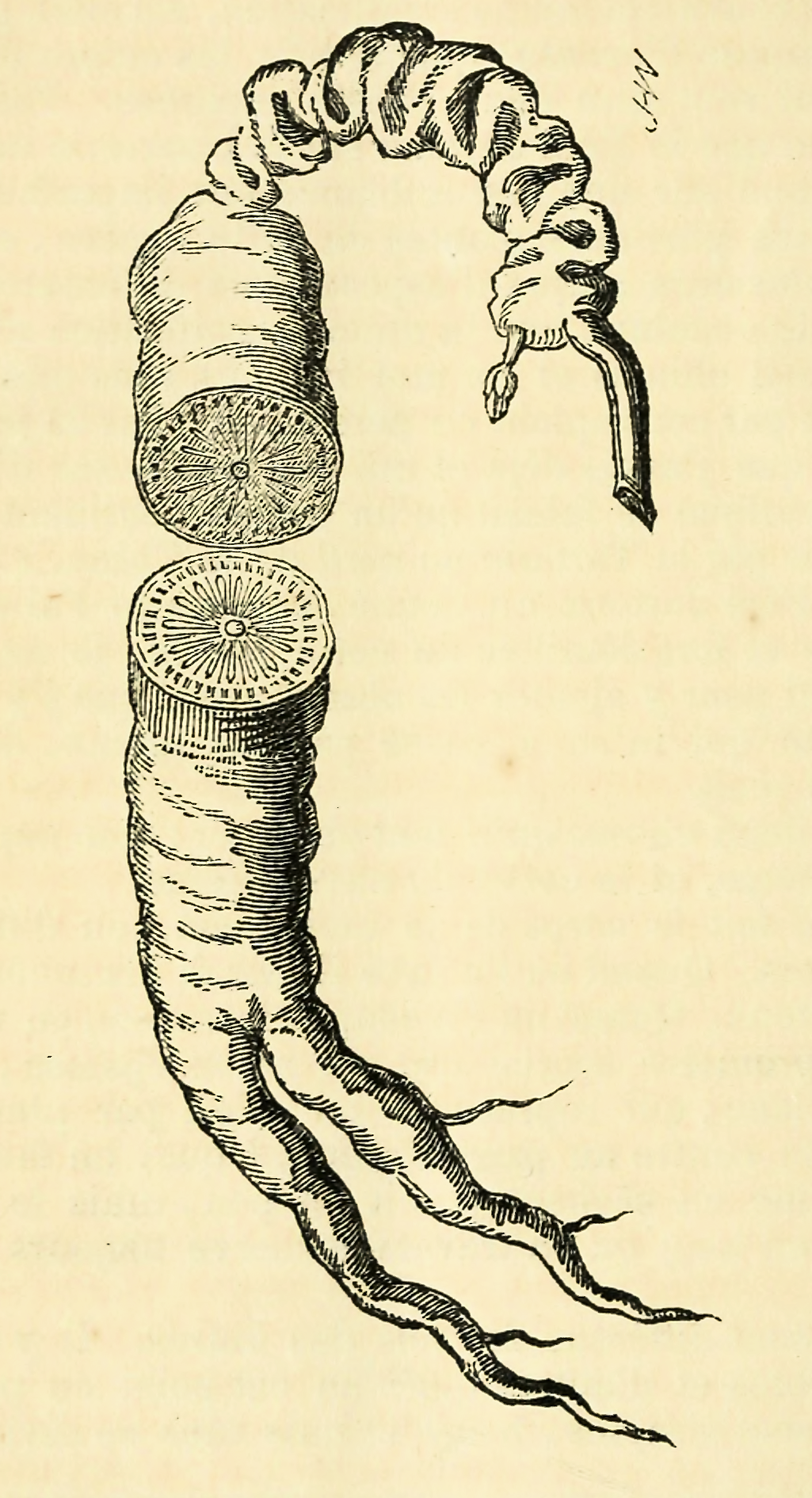
Lafitau described ginseng growing in Canada, illustration redrawn by Walker

His discovery of American ginseng in the forest bordering the St. Lawrence made Lafitau famous in the European academies. Ginseng was native to the New World as well as the Old and had long been known to the Iroquois for its medicinal properties. It was on his search for ginseng that Lafitau began to question Mohawk herbalists, gaining information of native customs and beliefs, which he hoped would benefit European knowledge of medicine.

First learning about the ginseng of Tartary (i.e. Northern China) from the writings of the Jesuit missionary Pierre Jartoux, Lafitau surmised that the conditions in North America would be favorable to the plant. He was determined to find the plant in the Iroquois culture so that he would have partial proof of their Asiatic origin. Encouraged by the Iroquois to continue his hunt, a Mohawk woman whom Lafitau had hired to find the plant recognized it as one of the common remedies of the Iroquois. Lafitau quickly sent for Jartoux's publication and description to identify the plant from the plate. In his discovery, Lafitau was the first to employ botanical plates in the field in order to gain information from Natives. His published report the Mémoire...concernant la précieuse plante du gin-seng in 1718 set off a hunt by market collectors who exported ginseng to China via France. As the son of a merchant, Lafitau was keen to describe the medical properties of ginseng in Galenic terms, which facilitated marketing the plant to European consumers across the world. Mémoire...concernant la précieuse plante du gin-seng has never been translated into English.

== Bibliography ==
=== Moeurs des Sauvages Amériquains ===
His major work, written in French, was first published in 1724 in Paris. It is entitled Customs of the American Indians Compared with the Customs of Primitive Times (Moeurs des Sauvages Amériquains, Comparées aux Moeurs des Premiers Temps) and is 1,100 pages in total. In 1974, Dr. William Fenton and Dr. Elizabeth Moore translated and edited the work as part of the Champlain Society's General Series.

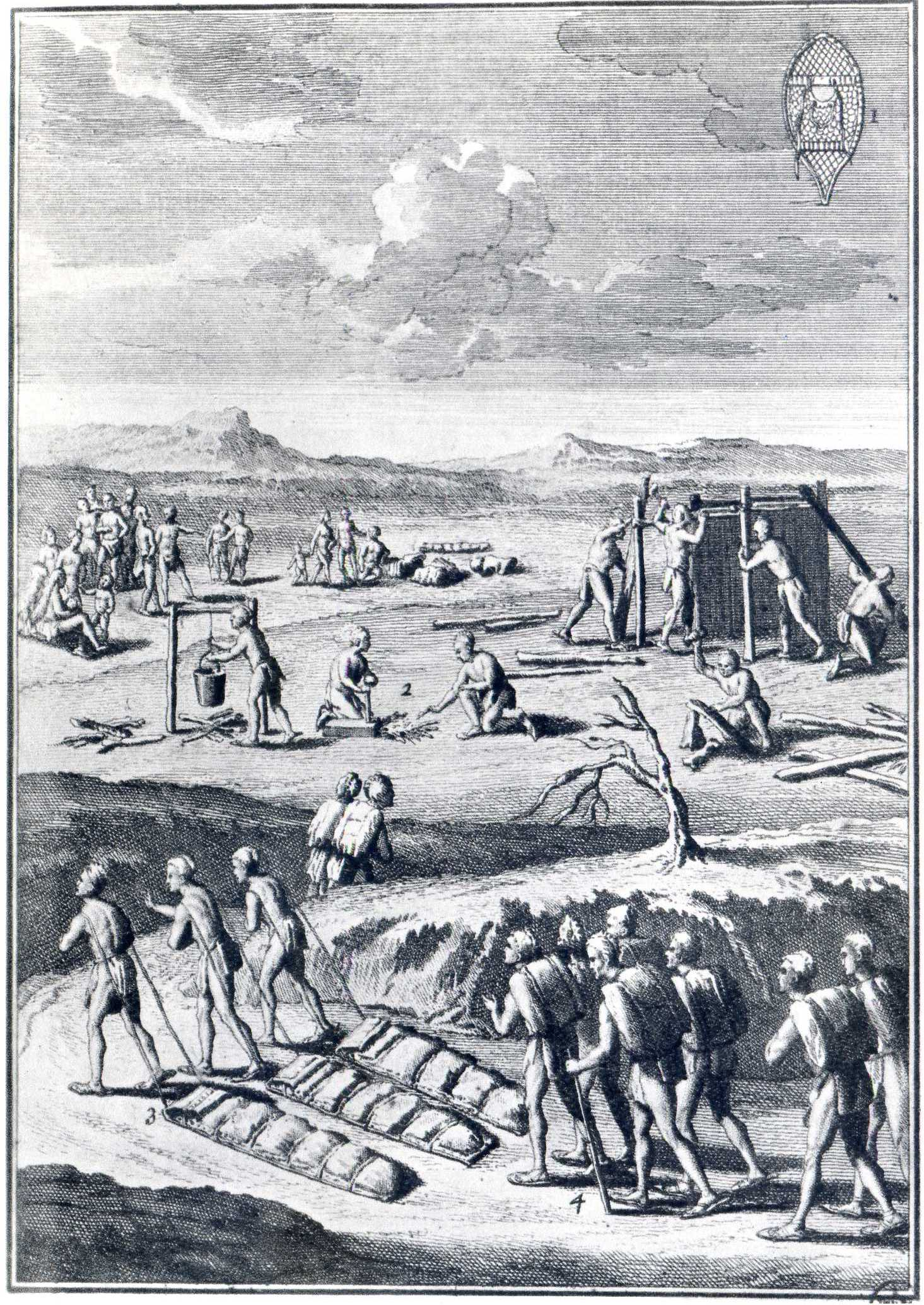
Daily lives of Indians in New France (eighteenth century)

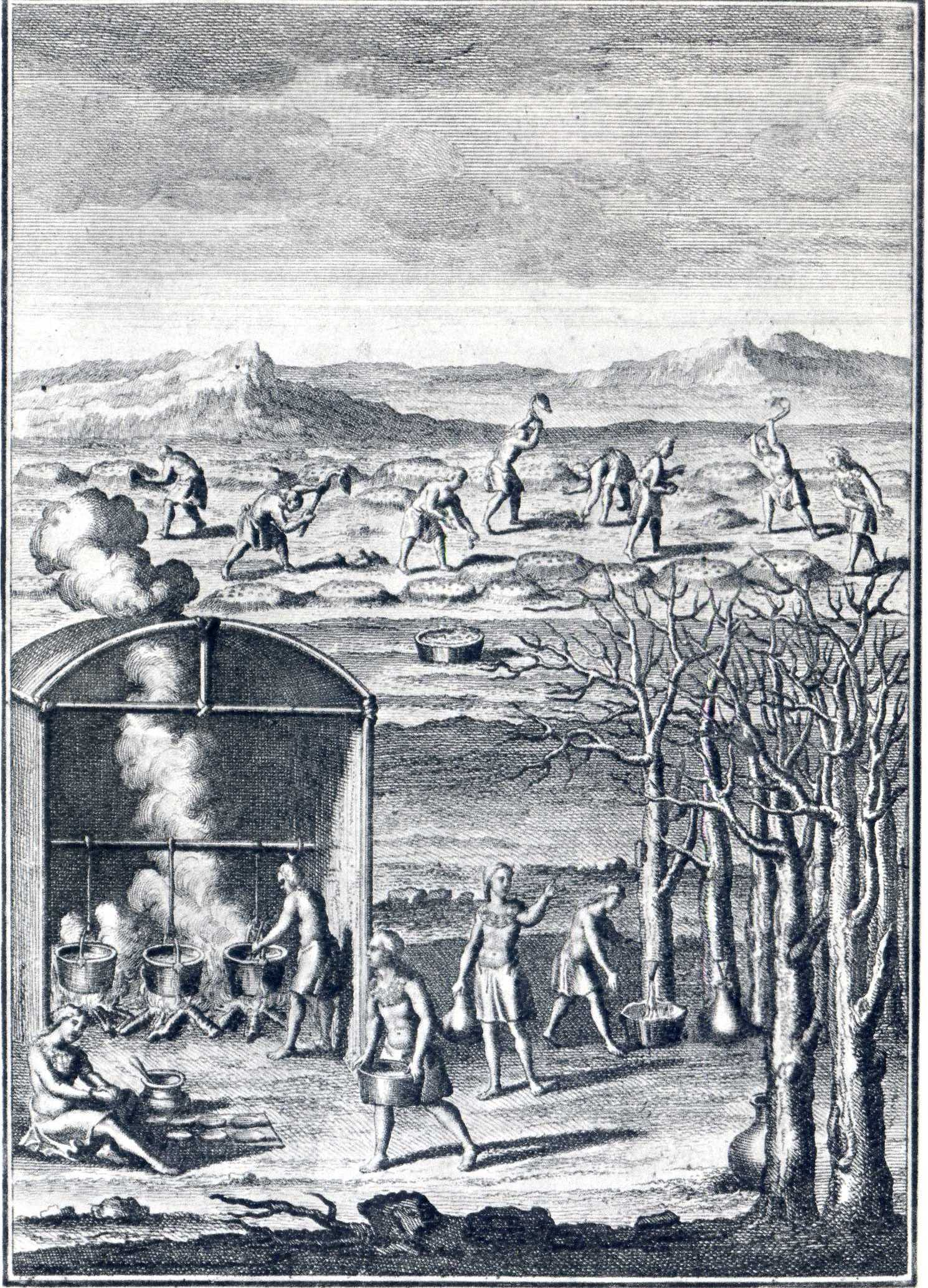
Manufacture of maple syrup by Native Americans in New France (eighteenth century)

Volume I

1. Design and Plan of the Work
2. The Origin of the peoples of America
3. Idea or Character of Primitives Peoples in General
4. Religion
5. Political Government
6. Marriage and Education

Volume II

1. Occupations of the Men in the Villages
2. Occupation of the Women
3. Warfare
4. Embassies and Trade
5. Hunting and Fishing
6. Games
7. Sickness and Medicine
8. Death, Burial and Mourning
9. Language

The length of each section reflects Lafitau's disproportionate devotion to specific aspects of the Iroquois. His 350-page chapter on religion accounts for his personal role as a missionary in Canada. Chapters on government, marriage, education, death, and burial are all roughly 70 pages in length. The longest chapters in Volume II on Occupation of the Women and Warfare is related to the importance of these subjects in Iroquois culture.

=== Other works ===
Aside from Moeurs des Sauvages Amériquains Lafitau wrote two other books:

- Histoire de Jean de Brienne, Roy de Jérusalem et Empereur de Constantinople was released in Paris before his return to Canada, 1727. However, the subject matter of this book is not widely known and very few copies are in circulation.
- In Histoire des découvertes et conquestes des Portugais dans le Nouveau Monde, Lafitau wrote two volumes in an attempt to make available to French readers details of exploration and adventure that were unknown to them. These commonly read and used chronicles of customs were published in 1733. Continuing with the same development of customs discussed in his first major work Moeurs des Sauvages Amériquains, Lafitau maintains that customs can only be understood in the original language of those who practice them.

== Return to France ==
Lafitau returned to France in November 1717. There he pleaded to colonial authorities that the brandy trade was forcing the Iroquois to move from Sault St. Louis to avoid the liquor trafficking. By arguing that the brandy trade with the Natives of Canada was against the interests of the Colony and the State, Lafitau was successful in stopping a lot of this activity.

The manuscript for his work on the Iroquois was submitted and approved in Paris on May 15, 1722. The ideas and writing style of Lafitau have been identified as characteristic of Cartesian Linguistics. His ideas were published at an important intersection between French Classicism and the New Rationalism that favored reason over authority and the stability of the laws of nature. The originality of Lafitau's work was not fully recognized during his lifetime because many of his ideas seemed similar to those published by earlier writers, but scholars of later centuries paid tribute to his unprecedented systematic comparative and evolutionary anthropology.
