= Abraham Ragueneau =

French painter

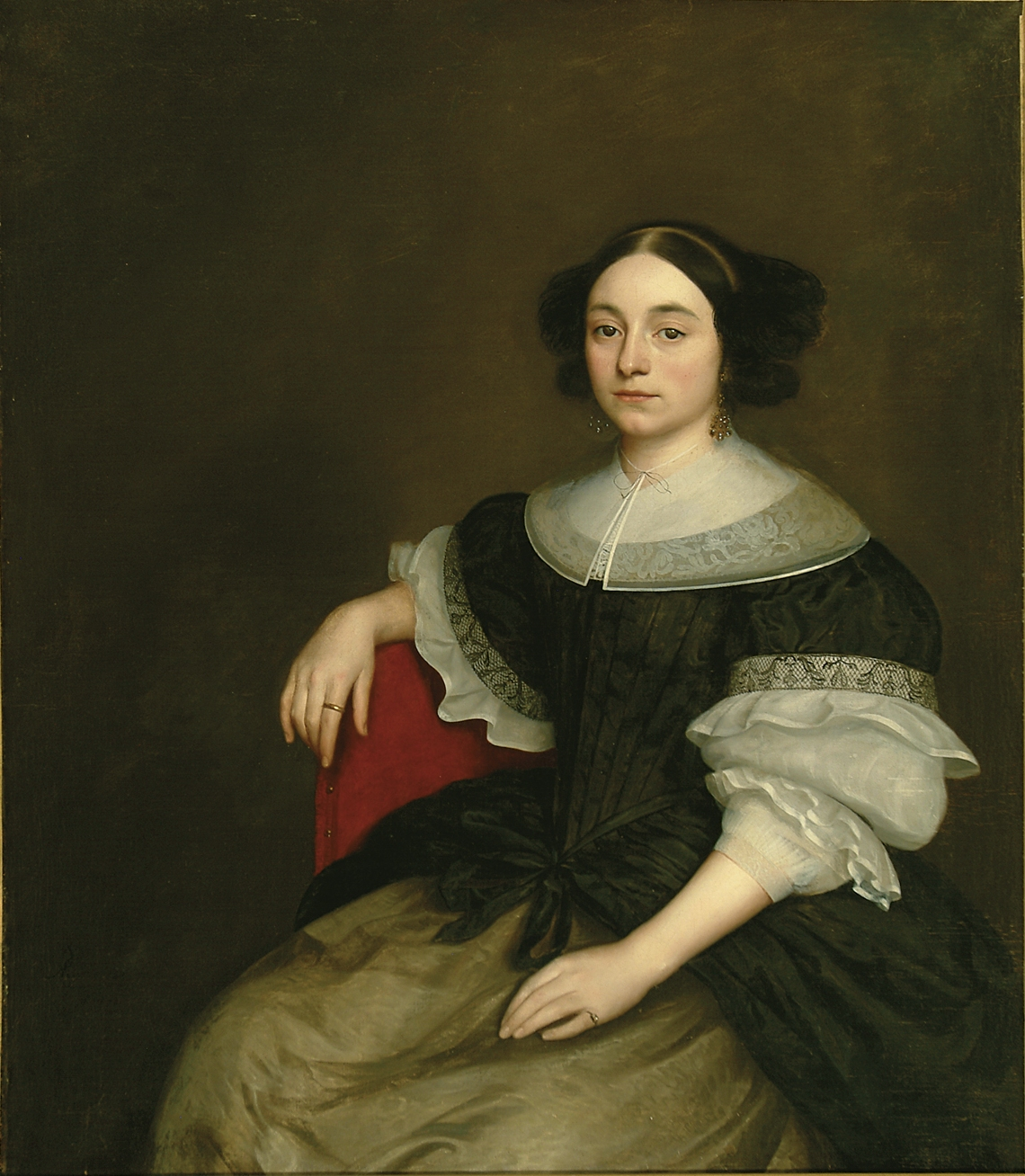
Portrait of a lady

Abraham Ragueneau (1623 – after 1681), was a French painter.

== Biography ==
He was born in London to French parents, but became a portrait painter and worked in the Hague as curator of the painting cabinet of William III of England from 1640 to 1669. He also worked in Leiden, Den Bosch, and Zierikzee.

He died after 1681.
