= Jean Baptiste Gonet =

French Dominican theologian

Jean Baptiste Gonet (about 1616 at Béziers, in the province of Languedoc – 24 January 1681 at Béziers) was a French Dominican theologian.

== Life ==
He received his primary education in his native place, and there at the age of seventeen entered the Order of St. Dominic. After his religious profession he was sent to the University of Bordeaux, where with unusual ability he devoted himself to the study of philosophy and theology, winning all honours in the customary examinations before advancement. Having received the doctorate he was appointed to the chair of scholastic theology in the university, in which capacity he proved himself a brilliant theologian and an exceptionally gifted teacher.

In 1671 he was elected provincial of his province; on the expiration of his term of office, he resumed the professorship of theology, holding it till 1678, when ill-health obliged him to return to his native place.

== Works ==
His principal work is the "Clypeus theologiae thomisticae contra novos ejus impugnatores" (16 vols, Bordeaux, 1659–69). From 1669 to 1681 no less than nine editions of this work appeared, the latest is that of Paris 1875. Shortly before his death he published his "Manuale thomistarum", which is an abridgment of his larger work.

As a theologian and academic disputant Gonet ranks among the most prominent figures of his time. An ardent defender and exponent of the teaching of Thomas Aquinas and an illustrious representative of Thomism, he set forth the traditional teaching of his school with clearness and skill, with some bitterness against the representatives of different views.

He lived at a time when theological discussion was rife, when men, weary of treading beaten paths, had set themselves to constructing systems of their own. His zeal, however, for the integrity of Thomistic teaching, and his bitter aversion from doctrinal novelty sometimes carried him beyond the teaching of his master, and led him to adopt opinions on certain questions of theology especially those dealing with predestination and reprobation which were rejected by many learned theologians of his own school.

In 1669 he published a work on the morality of human acts, the purpose of which was to defend the Thomistic doctrine at once against what he calls the laxities of the modern casuists, and the rigorism of the Jansenists. In this treatise he defends the probabiliorism of his school, and in the heat of the controversy is unsparing in his denunciations of the doctrine of probabilism.
