= Olivier Patru =

French lawyer and writer

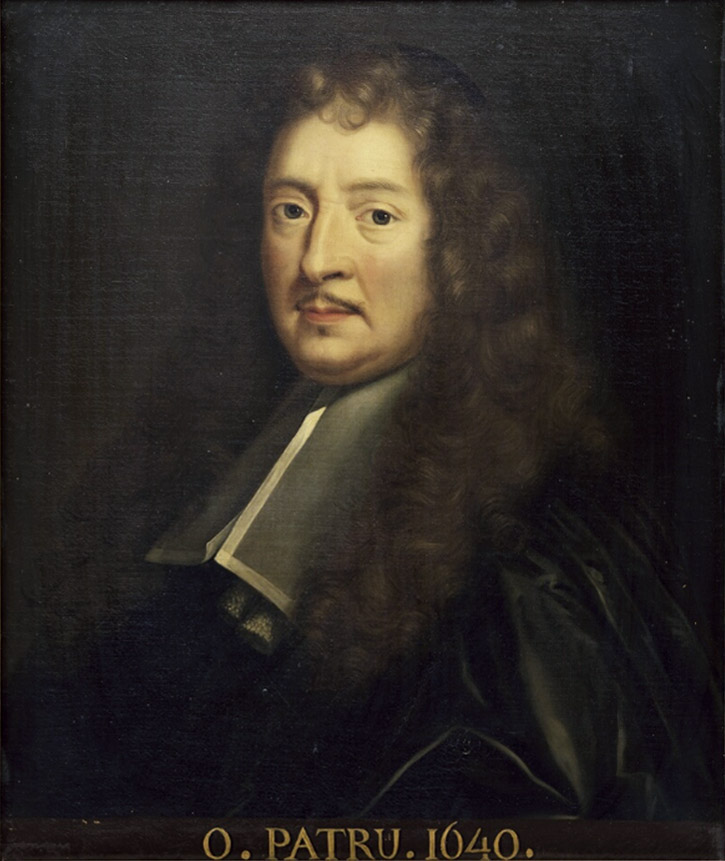

Olivier Patru (1604 – 16 January 1681) was a French lawyer and writer. He was born and died in Paris.
