= 1697 in literature =

This article contains information about the literary events and publications of 1697.

== Events ==
- May 7 – The 13th century royal Tre Kronor ("Three Crowns") castle in Stockholm burns to the ground and a large portion of the royal library is destroyed.
- The actors of the Comédie-Italienne in Paris announce a performance of La fausse prude (The False Hypocrite), a play that ridicules King Louis XIV's wife, Françoise d'Aubigné, Marquise de Maintenon, which causes the King to disband the company.
- George Farquhar arrives in London from Dublin.
- Thomas Corneille publishes his translation of Ovid's Metamorphoses into French.
- Daniel Defoe's An Essay Upon Projects suggests insurance, an income tax and the education of women, among other public measures.
- First publication of the 13th century Heimskringla in Old Norse, with Swedish and Latin translations by Johan Peringskiöld in Stockholm

== New books ==
=== Prose ===
- Mary Astell – A Serious Proposal to the Ladies, Part II
- Pierre Bayle – Dictionnaire historique et critique (Historical and Critical Dictionary, first part, publication continued until 1702)
- Richard Blackmore – King Arthur
- Thomas Burnet – Remarks upon An Essay Concerning Humane Understanding (on John Locke)
- William Congreve – The Birth of the Muse
- William Dampier – A New Voyage Round the World
- Daniel Defoe – An Essay Upon Projects
- John Dryden
  - Alexander's Feast; or, The Power of Musique (ode)
  - The Works of Virgil
- John Evelyn – Numismata: A discourse of medals
- Jane Lead – A Fountain of Gardens
- John Locke
  - A Letter to the Right Reverend Edward Ld Bishop of Worcester
  - Mr Locke's Reply to the Right Reverend the Lord Bishop of Worcester's Answer to his Letter
  - A Second Vindication of the Reasonableness of Christianity
- Charles Perrault (as Pierre Perrault Darmancourt) – Histoires ou contes du temps passé, avec dez moralitez: Les Contes de ma Mère l'Oye (Tales and Stories of the Past with Morals: Tales of Mother Goose)
- John Phillips – Augustus Britannicus
- Humphrey Prideaux – The True Nature of Imposture Fully Display'd in the Life of Mahomet
- John Wilmot, Earl of Rochester – Familiar Letters
- William Wotton – Reflections upon Ancient and Modern Learning (setting off the English "quarrel of the Ancients and Moderns")

=== Drama ===
- Anonymous (A Young Lady) – The Unnatural Mother
- Colley Cibber – Woman's Wit
- William Congreve – The Mourning Bride
- John Dennis – A Plot and No Plot
- Thomas Dilke – The City Lady, or Folly Reclaimed
- Thomas D'Urfey
  - Cinthia and Endimion (opera)
  - The Intrigues at Versailles; or, A Jilt in all Humours
- James Drake – The Sham Lawyer
- Charles Gildon – The Roman Brides Revenge
- Charles Hopkins – Boadicea, Queen of Britain
- Peter Anthony Motteux – The Novelty, or Every Act a Play
- Mary Pix
  - The Deceiver Deceiv'd
  - The Innocent Mistress
- George Powell – The Imposture Defeated, or a Trick to Cheat the Devil
- Jacques Pradon – Scipion
- Elkanah Settle – The World in the Moon
- John Vanbrugh
  - Aesop
  - The Provoked Wife
  - The Relapse (performed 1696, published 1697)

== Births ==
- April 1 - Abbé Prévost, French writer (died 1763)
- June 16 – Jean-Baptiste de La Curne de Sainte-Palaye, French historian, classicist and lexicographer (died 1781)
- December 27 – Sollom Emlyn, Irish legal writer (died 1754)

== Deaths ==
- February 5 – Hester Biddle (Esther Biddle), English Quaker writer (born c. 1629)
- March 1 – Francesco Redi, Tuscan physician, naturalist and poet (born 1626)
- June 7 – John Aubrey, English memoirist (born 1626)
- December 9 – Scipion Abeille, French surgeon and poet (year of birth unknown)
- Unknown date – Juan del Valle y Caviedes, Spanish Peruvian poet (born 1645)
- Probable year of death – Gilbert Clerke, English mathematician, natural philosopher and theologian (born 1626)
