= 1700 in literature =

This article contains information about the literary events and publications of 1700.

== Events ==
- February 1 – Richard Bentley becomes Master of Trinity College, Cambridge.
- Early March - William Congreve's comedy The Way of the World is first performed at the New Theatre, Lincoln's Inn Fields in London.
- May 5 – Within days of John Dryden's death on May 1, his last written work, The Secular Masque, is performed as part of Vanbrugh's version of The Pilgrim.

== New books ==
=== Fiction ===
- Aphra Behn (died 1689) – Histories, Novels, and Translations (fiction and nonfiction)
- Tom Brown – Amusements Serious and Comical
- Gatien de Courtilz de Sandras – Mémoires de Monsieur d'Artagnan
- Peter Anthony Motteux, editor – The History of the Renown'd Don-Quixote de la Mancha, translated by several hands, Volume 1 (Volumes 2–4 published in 1712 in the third edition)

=== Drama ===
- Anonymous – Caledonia, or the Pedlar Turned Merchant
- Abel Boyer – Achilles; or, Iphigenia in Aulis: a tragedy
- William Burnaby – The Reformed Wife
- Susannah Centlivre – The Perjur'd Husband; or, The Adventures of Venice: A tragedy
- Colley Cibber – The Tragical History of King Richard III
- William Congreve – The Way of the World, a comedy performed in March
- John Dennis – Iphigenia: A tragedy, performed in December 1699
- George Farquhar – The Constant Couple
- Charles Gildon – Measure for Measure
- Charles Hopkins – Friendship Improv'd; or, The Female Warriour: A tragedy, performed November 7, 1699
- Francis Manning – The Generous Choice
- John Oldmixon – The Grove, or Love's Paradise published ("semi-opera", music by Henry Purcell)
- William Philips – St. Stephen's Green
- Mary Pix – The Beau Defeated
- Nicholas Rowe – The Ambitious Stepmother
- Thomas Southerne – The Fate of Capua: A tragedy, performed about April
- John Vanbrugh – The Pilgrim: A comedy, anonymous; performed in April

=== Poetry ===
See 1700 in poetry

- Richard Blackmore – A Satyr Against Wit
- Thomas Brown – A Description of Mr. Dryden's Funeral, verse
- Samuel Cobb – Poetae Britannici
- Daniel Defoe – The Pacificator
- Sor Juana Inés de la Cruz – Fama y obras póstumas del Fénix de México
- William King – The Transactioneer With Some of his Philosophical Fancies (satire of Philosophical Transactions)
- John Pomfret – Reason
- John Tutchin – The Foreigners, published anonymously (verse satire on William III's Dutch ministers; Daniel Defoe replied in The True-Born Englishman in 1701))
- Ned Ward – The Reformer

=== Non-fiction ===
- Mary Astell – Some Reflections upon Marriage
- James Brome – Travels over England, Scotland, and Wales
- Jeremy Collier – A Second Defence of the Short View of the Profaneness and Immorality of the English Stage &c (See 1698 in literature)
- Eugenia (authorship unknown) – The Female Advocate: Or, a plea for the just liberty of the tender sex, and particularly of married women...
- Francis Moore – Vox Stellarum: An almanac for 1701 (first in a series of yearly "almanacs" of astrology)
- Sir William Temple – Letters Written by Sir W. Temple, and Other Ministers of State, Both at Home and Abroad (putatively edited by Jonathan Swift)
- Pavao Ritter Vitezović – Croatia Rediviva
- Ned Ward – A Step to the Bath: With a character of the place, published anonymously
- Anonymous; perhaps Daniel Defoe – Castration of Popish Ecclesiastics

== Births ==
- February 2 – Johann Christoph Gottsched, German philosopher (died 1766)
- May 25 – Nicolaus Ludwig Zinzendorf, German theologian (died 1760)
- September 11 – James Thomson, Scottish poet (died 1748)
- November 25 – Kata Bethlen, Hungarian memoirist and correspondent (died 1759)

== Deaths ==
- January 7 – Raffaello Fabretti, Italian antiquary (born 1618)
- March 14 – Henry Killigrew, English clergyman, poet and playwright (born 1613)
- May 12
  - Joseph Athias, Spanish-born publisher of Hebrew Bible (born 1635)
  - John Dryden, English poet (born 1631)
- July – Thomas Creech, English translator (born 1659; suicide)
- August 6 – Johann Beer, Austrian author, court official and composer (born 1655; hunting accident)
- August 8 – Joseph Moxon, English mathematician and lexicographer (born 1627)
- August 22 – Carlos de Sigüenza y Góngora, Mexican priest, poet, geographer, and historian (born 1645)
- Unknown date – Charles Hopkins, Anglo-Irish poet and dramatist (born 1664)
