= The Mistakes =

1690 play

- Original language: English
- Written by: Joseph Harris
- Genre: Tragicomedy

Premiere
- Date: December 1690
- Place: Theatre Royal, Drury Lane, London

The Mistakes is a 1690 tragicomedy by the English writer Joseph Harris. It was originally staged at the Theatre Royal, Drury Lane by the United Company.

The original Drury Lane cast included John Hodgson as Don Juan de Mendoza, George Powell as Alberto, John Verbruggen as Antonio, William Mountfort as Ricardo, William Bowen as Lopez, Anne Bracegirdle as Miranda and Charlotte Butler as Astella. The prologue was written by John Dryden. An afterword was written by Nahum Tate, and the work is dedicated to the court painter Godfrey Kneller.

== Bibliography ==
- Van Lennep, W. The London Stage, 1660-1800: Volume One, 1660-1700. Southern Illinois University Press, 1960.
