= Distressed Innocence =

1690 play

- Original language: English
- Written by: Elkanah Settle
- Genre: Tragedy

Premiere
- Date: October 1690
- Place: Theatre Royal, Drury Lane, London

Distress'd Innocence; Or, The Princess Of Persia is a 1690 tragedy by the English writer Elkanah Settle. It was first performed by the United Company at the Theatre Royal, Drury Lane in London. Incidental music was composed for the play by Henry Purcell.

The original cast included John Bowman as Isdigerdes, William Mountfort as Hormidas, George Powell as Theodosius, John Hodgson as Audas, George Bright as Cleontes, Edward Kynaston as Otrantes, Samuel Sandford as Rugildas, John Freeman and John Verbruggen as Persian Magi, Elizabeth Barry as Orundana, Anne Bracegirdle as Cleomira and Katherine Corey as Doranthe.

== Bibliography ==
- Brown, Frank Clyde. Elkanah Settle. University of Chicago Press, 1910.
- Schab, Alon. 'Distress'd Sources? A Critical Consideration of the Authority of Purcell's "Ayres for the Theatre"'. Early Music, Vol. 37, No. 4 (Nov., 2009), 633-645.
- Van Lennep, W. The London Stage, 1660-1800: Volume One, 1660-1700. Southern Illinois University Press, 1960.
