= John Hodgson (actor) =

English actor

John Hodgson was an English stage actor of the late seventeenth century. He joined the United Company in 1688 and his first recorded appearance was in The Treacherous Brothers at Drury Lane in 1690. In 1695 he was one of several actors who broke away to join Thomas Betterton's new company at Lincoln's Inn Fields. His name is sometimes written as Hudson. He was married to the singer Mary Hodgson.

== Selected roles ==
- Orgillus in The Treacherous Brothers by George Powell (1690)
- Audas in Distressed Innocence by Elkanah Settle (1690)
- Don Juan de Mendoza in The Mistakes by Joseph Harris (1690)
- Tachmas in Alphonso, King of Naples by George Powell (1690)
- Count Canail in Sir Anthony Love by Thomas Southerne (1690)
- Sir Robert Holland in Edward III by William Mountfort (1690)
- Lord Worthy in Greenwich Park by William Mountfort (1691)
- Will Merriton in Love for Money by Thomas D'Urfey (1691)
- Conon in King Arthur by John Dryden (1691)
- Monsieur in Bussy D'Ambois by Thomas D'Urfey (1691)
- Sussex in Henry II by William Mountfort (1692)
- Coenus in Cleomenes, the Spartan Hero by John Dryden (1692)
- Welford in The Volunteers by Thomas Shadwell (1692)
- Darewell in The Marriage-Hater Matched by Thomas D'Urfey (1692)
- Hotspur in The Richmond Heiress by Thomas D'Urfey (1693)
- Meanwell in The Female Virtuosos by Thomas Wright (1693)
- Wellborn in A Very Good Wife by George Powell (1693)
- Philabel in The She-Gallants by George Granville (1695)
- Abradatas in Cyrus the Great by John Banks (1695)
- Lord Lovewel in Love's a Jest by Peter Motteux (1696)
- Beaumont in The Innocent Mistress by Mary Pix (1696)
- Ismael in The Royal Mischief by Delarivier Manley (1696)
- Lovewell in She Ventures and He Wins by Ariadne (1696)
- Lovebright in The City Lady by Thomas Dilke (1696)
- Heartfree in The Provoked Wife by John Vanbrugh (1697)
- Count de Fiesque in The Intrigues at Versailles by Thomas D'Urfey (1697)
- Alfonso in The Italian Husband by Edward Ravenscroft (1697)
- Count Andrea in The Deceiver Deceived by Mary Pix (1697)
- Decius in Boadicea, Queen of Britain by Charles Hopkins (1697)
- Fabiano Beauty in Distress by Peter Motteux (1698)
- Mardonius in Xerxes by Colley Cibber (1699)
- Bucarius in The False Friend by Mary Pix (1699)
- Pacuvius Calavius in The Fate of Capua by Thomas Southerne (1700)
- Dumnacus in Love's Victim by Charles Gildon (1701)
- Demetrius in The Czar of Muscovy by Mary Pix (1701)

== Bibliography ==
- Highfill, Philip H, Burnim, Kalman A. & Langhans, Edward A. A Biographical Dictionary of Actors, Actresses, Musicians, Dancers, Managers, and Other Stage Personnel in London, 1660–1800. SIU Press, 1978.
- Lowerre, Kathryn. Music and Musicians on the London Stage, 1695–1705. Routledge, 2017.
- Van Lennep, W. The London Stage, 1660–1800: Volume One, 1660–1700. Southern Illinois University Press, 1960.
