= Cleomenes, the Spartan Hero =

Restoration tragedy by John Dryden

- Original language: English
- Written by: John Dryden
- Genre: Tragedy

Premiere
- Date: April 1692
- Place: Theatre Royal, Drury Lane, London

Cleomenes, the Spartan Hero or Cleomenes, The Spartan Heroe: A Tragedy is a 1692 tragedy by the English writer John Dryden. It was first staged at the Theatre Royal, Drury Lane by the United Company. It portrays the reign of Cleomenes, the King of Sparta, inspired by Plutarch's history of the period. Dryden's version is strongly Jacobite in drawing parallels from his overthrow to the recent Glorious Revolution in England. Because of this it was temporarily banned by the authority of Queen Mary.

The original Drury Lane cast included Thomas Betterton as Cleomenes, Anthony Leigh as Cleonidas, John Verbruggen as Ptolomy, Samuel Sandford as Sosybius, William Mountfort as Cleanthes, Edward Kynaston as Pantheus, John Hodgson as Coenus, Mary Betterton as Cratisiclea, Anne Bracegirdle as Cleora and Elizabeth Barry as Cassandra.

It was published by Jacob Tonson who had by this time secured exclusive rights to Dryden's work past and present. The published version was dedicated to the Tory politician, the Earl of Rochester.

== Bibliography ==
- Canfield, John Douglas. Heroes and States: On the Ideology of Restoration Tragedy. University Press of Kentucky, 2000.
- Van Lennep, W. The London Stage, 1660-1800: Volume One, 1660-1700. Southern Illinois University Press, 1960.
