= 1698 in literature =

This article contains information about the literary events and publications of 1698.

== Events ==
- March – In his Short View of the Immorality and Profaneness of the English Stage, clergyman Jeremy Collier attacks leading contemporary dramatists (William Congreve and Sir John Vanbrugh most prominently, but also John Dryden, Thomas d'Urfey, and William Wycherley) for moral shortcomings in their works. Collier's book launches a controversy that dominates the literary world of Britain for the year; future editions of the book continue the controversy until Collier's death in 1726.
- The Society for Promoting Christian Knowledge is formed by the Reverend Thomas Bray.
- The latest edition of the Bay Psalm Book is the first to include music.

== New books ==
=== Prose ===
- Anonymous – The Maxims of the Saints Explained, Concerning the Interiour Life (translation of François Fénelon)
- Francis Atterbury – A Discourse Occasion'd by the Death of the Right Honourable the Lady Cutts
- Jacques-Bénigne Bossuet – Relation sur le quiétisme
- Charles Boyle, 4th Earl of Orrery – Dr. Bentley's Dissertations on the Epistles of Phalaris, and the Fables of Aesop
- Cornelis de Bruijn – Reizen van Cornelis de Bruyn door de vermaardste Deelen van Klein Asia (A Voyage to the Levant: or Travels in the Principal Parts of Asia Minor)
- John Bunyan – The Heavenly Foot-Man; or, A Description of the Man that Gets to Heaven
- Jeremy Collier – A Short View of the Immorality and Profaneness of the English Stage (continued in 1699, 1700, 1703, and 1708)
- William Congreve – Amendments of Mr Collier's False and Imperfect Citations
- Daniel Defoe
  - An Enquiry into the Occasional Conformity of Dissenters, in Cases of Preferment
  - The Poor Man's Plea
- John Dennis – The Usefulness of the Stage, to the Happiness of Mankind, to Government and to Religion
- John Dunton – Teague Land: or A Merry Ramble to the Wild Irish
- Andrew Fletcher – A Discourse of Government with Relation to Militia's
- George Fox – A Collection of Many Select and Christian Epistles, Letters and Testimonials
- Charles Gildon – The Lives and Characters of the English Dramatic Poets
- Robert Gould – A Satyr Against Wooing
- Charles Leslie – A Short and Easie Method with the Deists
- Edmund Ludlow – Memoirs of Edmund Ludlow Esq.
- Maximilien Misson – Mémoires et observations faites par un voyageur en Angleterre
- Walter Pope – Moral and Political Fables, Ancient and Modern
- George Ridpath – The Stage Condemn'd
- Elkanah Settle – A Defence of Dramatick Poetry
- Algernon Sidney – Discourses Concerning Government (vs. Robert Filmer)
- Tooke's Pantheon of the Heathen Gods and Illustrious Heroes
- John Vanbrugh – A Short Vindication of The Relapse and The Provok'd Wife, from Immorality and Prophaneness by the Author
- Ned Ward
  - The London Spy (published as periodical through 1700)
  - A Trip to Jamaica
- Benjamin Whichcote – Select Sermons of Dr. Whichcot (ed. Anthony Ashley Cooper, Earl Shaftesbury)

=== Drama ===
- Catherine Trotter Cockburn – The Fatal Friendship
- John Crowne – Caligula
- Thomas Dilke – The Pretenders
- John Dennis – Rinaldo and Armida
- Thomas D'Urfey – The Campaigners
- George Farquhar – Love and a Bottle
- Charles Gildon – Phaeton; or, The Fatal Divorce
- George Granville – The Heroick Love
- Peter Anthony Motteux – Beauty in Distress
- John Oldmixon – Amintas (adapted from Aminta of Tasso)
- William Philips – The Revengeful Queen
- Mary Pix – Queen Catharine, or, The Ruins of Love
- Edward Ravenscroft – The Italian Husband

=== Poetry ===
- Charles Hopkins – White-hall; or, The Court of England
- John Hughes – The Triumph of Peace
- See also 1698 in poetry

== Births ==
- January 3 – Metastasio, born Pietro Antonio Domenico Trapassi, Italian poet and opera librettist (died 1782)
- January 10? – Richard Savage, English poet (died 1743)
- May 8 – Henry Baker, English poet and naturalist (died 1774)
- July 19 – Johann Jakob Bodmer, Swiss author (died 1783)
- November 28 – Charlotta Frölich, Swedish poet and political writer (died 1770)
- December 24 – William Warburton, English critic (died 1779)
- Unknown date – Alasdair mac Mhaighstir Alasdair, Scottish Gaelic poet (died 1770)

== Deaths ==
- January 14 – Jacques Pradon, French dramatist (born 1632)
- February 7 – Richard Adams, English theologian (born c. 1626)
- February 11 – Anna Åkerhielm, Swedish writer and traveller (born 1642)
- March 2 – Jacques Quétif, French bibliographer (born 1618)
- July 18 – Johann Heinrich Heidegger, Swiss theologian (born 1663)
- August 25 – Fleetwood Sheppard, English courtier and literary wit (born 1634)
- September 3 – Sir Robert Howard, English dramatist and politician (born 1626)
- October 11 – William Molyneux, Irish philosopher and political writer (born 1656)
- December 11 (buried) – Elizabeth van der Woude, Dutch traveler and author (born 1657)
- Unknown dates
  - Antoine Arnauld, French memoirist (born 1616)
  - Francesco Negri, Italian travel writer (born 1623)
