= Elizabeth Bowman =

English actress (c. 1677 – 1707)

Elizabeth Bowman (c. 1677 – 1707) was an English stage actress of the seventeenth and early eighteenth century. The daughter of Sir Francis Watson, 1st Baronet she was adopted by the actor manager Thomas Betterton. In 1692, she married John Bowman and began acting at Drury Lane the following year as Mrs Bowman. She was a member of the United Company until 1695 then joined Betterton's breakaway at the Lincoln's Inn Fields Theatre.

== Selected roles ==
- Sylvia in The Old Batchelor by William Congreve (1693)
- Mrs Stockjobb in The Richmond Heiress by Thomas D'Urfey (1693)
- Cecilia in The Married Beau by John Crowne (1694)
- Mrs Foresight in Love For Love by William Congreve (1695)
- Juliana in She Ventures and He Wins by Ariadne (1695)
- Mrs Plant in The Lover's Luck by Thomas Dilke (1695)
- Lucinda in The She-Gallants by George Granville (1695)
- Arabella The City Bride by Joseph Harris (1696)
- Selima in The Royal Mischief by Delarivier Manley (1696)
- Mrs Angelica in The Anatomist by Edward Ravenscroft (1696)
- Lucinda in The City Lady by Thomas Dilke (1696)
- Countess de Brissac in The Intrigues at Versailles by Thomas D'Urfey (1697)
- Lady Fancyfull in The Provoked Wife by John Vanbrugh (1697)
- Alouisia in The Italian Husband by Edward Ravenscroft (1697)
- Venutia in Boadicea, Queen of Britain by Charles Hopkins (1697)
- Ophelia in The Pretenders by Thomas Dilke (1698)
- Urania in Rinaldo and Armida by John Dennis (1698)
- Appamia in The False Friend by Mary Pix (1699)
- Mrs Clerimont in The Beau Defeated by Mary Pix (1700)
- Mrs Fainall in The Way of the World by William Congreve (1700)
- Cleone in The Ambitious Stepmother by Nicholas Rowe (1700)
- Nerissa in The Jew of Venice by George Granville (1701)
- Marina in The Czar of Muscovy by Mary Pix (1701)
- Berenice in Antiochus the Great by Jane Wiseman (1701)
- Lady Dolt in The Ladies Visiting Day by William Burnaby (1701)
- Candace in Altemira by Roger Boyle (1701)
- Damon in The Fickle Shepherdess by Anonymous (1703)
- Lucinda in The Governour of Cyprus by John Oldmixon (1703)
- Mrs Hartley in As You Find It by Charles Boyle (1703)
- Leonora in The Mistake by John Vanbrugh (1705)
- Diana in The Temple of Love by Pierre Motteux (1706)
- Urganda in The British Enchanters by George Granville (1706)
- Emelia in Adventures in Madrid by Mary Pix (1706)
- Florinda in The Rover by Aphra Behn (1707)

== Bibliography ==
- Caines, Michael in The Plays and Poems of Nicholas Rowe, Volume I: The Early Plays. Taylor & Francis, 2016.
- Lanier, Henry Wysham. The First English Actresses: From the Initial Appearance of Women on the Stage in 1660 Till 1700. The Players, 1930.
- Van Lennep, W. The London Stage, 1660–1800: Volume One, 1660–1700. Southern Illinois University Press, 1960.
