= Love Triumphant =

Restoration tragicomedy by John Dryden

- Original language: English
- Written by: John Dryden
- Genre: Tragicomedy

Premiere
- Date: January 1694
- Place: Theatre Royal, Drury Lane, London

Love Triumphant; Or, Nature Will Prevail is a 1694 tragicomedy by the English writer John Dryden. It was Dryden's final stage play.

It was originally staged by the United Company at the Theatre Royal, Drury Lane. The first cast included Thomas Betterton as Alphonso, Edward Kynaston as Veramond, Joseph Williams as Garcia, John Verbruggen as Ramirez, Thomas Doggett as Sancho, George Powell as Carlos, Cave Underhill as Lopez, Mary Betterton as Ximena, Elizabeth Barry as Victoria, Anne Bracegirdle as Celidea, Susanna Mountfort as Dalinda and Mary Kent as Nurse. Incidental music was provided by John Eccles and Henry Purcell.

The published version of the play was dedicated to Earl of Salisbury, who shared Jacobite sympathies with Dryden. It was printed by the publisher Jacob Tonson who secured exclusive rights to Dryden's work late in the writer's career.

== Bibliography ==
- Nicoll, Allardyce. History of English Drama, 1660-1900: Volume 1, Restoration Drama, 1660-1700. Cambridge University Press, 1952.
- Van Lennep, W. The London Stage, 1660-1800: Volume One, 1660-1700. Southern Illinois University Press, 1960.
