= Edward III (1690 play) =

1690 play

- Written by: John Bancroft; William Mountfort
- Original language: English
- Genre: Tragedy
- Setting: England, 14th century

Premiere
- Date premiered: November 1690
- Place premiered: Theatre Royal, Drury Lane, London

King Edward The Third; With The Fall Of Mortimer, Earl Of March is a 1690 tragedy, generally attributed to the English writers John Bancroft and William Mountfort. It was first performed by the United Company at the Theatre Royal, Drury Lane in London. It portrays the early years of the reign of Edward III and his defeat and execution of Roger Mortimer, Earl of March.

The original Drury Lane cast included George Powell as King Edward the Third, Joseph Williams as Mortimer, Earl of March, William Mountfort as Lord Mountacute, Edward Kynaston as Delamore, John Hodgson as Sir Robert Holland, Anthony Leigh as Bishop of Hereford, James Nokes as Serjeant Eitherside, John Freeman as Nevill, George Bright as Sly, John Bowman as Earl of Leicester, Samuel Sandford as Earl of Exeter, Elizabeth Barry as Isabella and Anne Bracegirdle as Maria. When published it was dedicated to the politician Lord Sydney.

== Bibliography ==
- Nicoll, Allardyce. History of English Drama, 1660-1900: Volume 1, Restoration Drama, 1660-1700. Cambridge University Press, 1952.
- Van Lennep, W. The London Stage, 1660-1800: Volume One, 1660-1700. Southern Illinois University Press, 1960.
