= The Richmond Heiress =

1693 play

- Original language: English
- Written by: Thomas D'Urfey
- Genre: Comedy

Premiere
- Date: April 1693
- Place: Theatre Royal, Drury Lane, London

The Richmond Heiress is a 1693 comedy play by the English writer Thomas D'Urfey.

It was staged by the United Company at the Drury Lane Theatre. The original cast included John Freeman as Charles Romance, George Bright as Sir Quibble Quere, George Powell as Tom Romance, Samuel Sandford as Doctor Guaiacum, Joseph Williams as Frederick, John Bowman as Rice ap Shinken, Cave Underhill as Dick Stockjobb, John Hodgson as Hotspur, Thomas Doggett as Quickwit, William Bowen as Cummington, Anne Bracegirdle as Fulvia, Elizabeth Barry as Sophronia, Frances Maria Knight as Madame Squeamish, Elizabeth Bowman as Mrs Stockjobb and Elinor Leigh as Marmalette. Henry Purcell composed incidental music for the play.

== Bibliography ==
- Keates, Jonathan. Purcell: A Biography. UPNE, 1996.
- Watson, George. The New Cambridge Bibliography of English Literature: Volume 2, 1660-1800. Cambridge University Press, 1971.
- Van Lennep, W. The London Stage, 1660-1800: Volume One, 1660-1700. Southern Illinois University Press, 1960.
