= Alphonso, King of Naples =

1690 play by George Powell

- Written by: George Powell
- Original language: English
- Genre: Tragedy

Premiere
- Date premiered: December 1690
- Place premiered: Theatre Royal, Drury Lane, London

Alphonso, King of Naples is a 1690 tragedy by the English writer George Powell.

First staged by the United Company at the Theatre Royal, Drury Lane, the original cast included John Bowman as Alphonso, George Powell as Ferdinand, William Mountfort as Cesario, John Hodgson as Tachmas, Colley Cibber as Sigismond, John Freeman as Oswell, William Bowen as Fabio and Anne Bracegirdle as Urania.

== Bibliography ==
- Van Lennep, W. The London Stage, 1660-1800: Volume One, 1660-1700. Southern Illinois University Press, 1960.
