= The Treacherous Brothers =

1690 play

- Original language: English
- Written by: George Powell
- Genre: Tragedy

Premiere
- Date: January 1690
- Place: Theatre Royal, Drury Lane, London

The Treacherous Brothers is a 1690 tragedy by the English writer George Powell.

The original Drury Lane cast included George Powell as the King of Cyprus, John Verbruggen as Meleander, Joseph Williams as Ithocles, William Mountfort as Menaphon, John Hodgson as Orgillus, Elizabeth Boutell as Semanthe, Charlotte Butler as Statilia and Anne Bracegirdle as Marcelia.

== Bibliography ==
- Van Lennep, W. The London Stage, 1660-1800: Volume One, 1660-1700. Southern Illinois University Press, 1960.
- Watson, George. The New Cambridge Bibliography of English Literature: Volume 2, 1660-1800. Cambridge University Press, 1971.
