= As You Find It =

Play by Charles Boyle

- Original language: English
- Written by: Charles Boyle
- Genre: Comedy

Premiere
- Date: 28 April 1703
- Place: Lincoln's Inn Fields Theatre

As You Find It is a 1703 comedy play by the English writer Charles Boyle, later Earl of Orrery. His grandfather Roger Boyle, 1st Earl of Orrery had also been a playwright. In style it is much closer to traditional Restoration comedy, than the developing trend for Sentimental comedy.

Staged at the Lincoln's Inn Fields Theatre in London, the cast featured John Verbruggen as Hartley, Thomas Doggett as Sir Abel Single, Thomas Betterton as Bevil, George Pack as Jack Single, George Powell as Ledger, John Bowman as Sir Pert, Anne Bracegirdle as Orinda, Elizabeth Bowman as Mrs Hartley, Elizabeth Barry as Eugenia and Elinor Leigh as Chloris.

== Bibliography ==
- Burling, William J. A Checklist of New Plays and Entertainments on the London Stage, 1700-1737. Fairleigh Dickinson Univ Press, 1992.
- Lowerre, Kathryn. Music and Musicians on the London Stage, 1695-1705. Routledge, 2017.
- Nicoll, Allardyce. History of English Drama, 1660-1900, Volume 2. Cambridge University Press, 2009.
