= The Old Bachelor =

1693 play by William Congreve

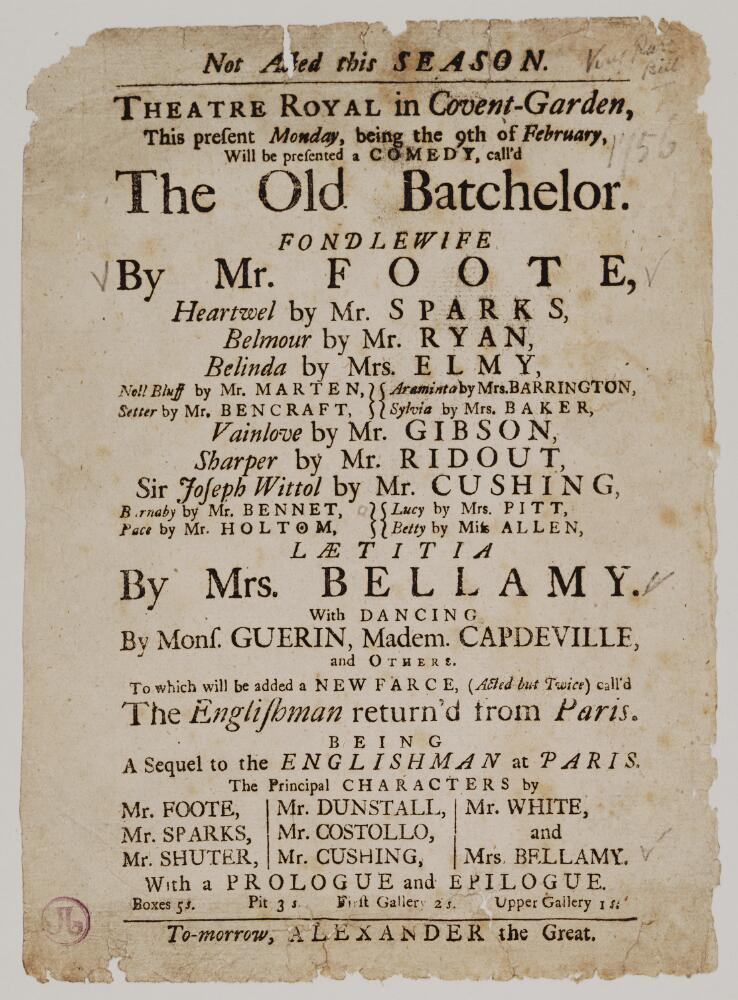
"The Old Bachelor" at Covent Garden in 1756 featuring Samuel Foote, Mr Sparks, Mr Ryan, Mrs Elmy...

The Old Bachelor is the first play written by British playwright William Congreve, produced in 1693. Incidental music for the play was written by Henry Purcell. Originally staged by the United Company at the Theatre Royal, Drury Lane the cast included Thomas Betterton as Heartwell, George Powell as Bellmour, Joseph Williams as Vainlove, William Bowen as Sir Joseph, Joseph Haines as Bluff, Thomas Doggett as Fondlewife, Cave Underhill as Servant, Anne Bracegirdle as Araminta, Susanna Mountfort as Belinda, Elizabeth Barry as Laetitia, Elizabeth Bowman as Sylvia, Elinor Leigh as Lucy.

== Plot ==
The 'Old Bachelor' is Heartwell, 'a surly old bachelor, pretending to slight women', who falls in love with Silvia, not knowing her to be the forsaken mistress of Vainlove, and is lured into marrying her, only discovering her true character afterwards, from the gibes of his acquaintances. The parson who has been brought in to marry them, however, is in fact Vainlove's friend Bellmour, who has assumed the disguise for the purpose of an intrigue with Laetitia, the young wife of an uxorious old banker, Fondlewife; and Heartwell is relieved to discover that the marriage was a pretence.

The comedy includes the amusing characters of Sir Joseph Wittol, a foolish knight, who allows himself to be really married to Silvia, under the impression that she is the wealthy Araminta; and his companion, the cowardly bully, Captain Bluffe, who under the same delusion is married to Silvia's maid. The success of this comedy was in part due to the acting of performers Thomas Betterton and Anne Bracegirdle.

== Characters ==
- Heartwell - an old bachelor secretly in love with Silvia
- Bellmour - in love with Belinda
- Vainlove - in love with Araminta
- Sharper
- Sir Joseph Wittol
- Captain Bluffe
- Fondlewife - a banker
- Setter - a pimp
- Araminta - in love with Vainlove
- Belinda - her cousin, in love with Bellmour
- Lætita - wife of Fondlewife
- Silvia - Vainlove’s forsaken mistress
- Lucy - her maid
- Betty

== See also ==
- Restoration comedy
