= Henry II (play) =

1692 play

- Original language: English
- Written by: William Mountfort
- Genre: Tragedy
- Setting: England, 12th century

Premiere
- Date: 8 November 1692
- Place: Theatre Royal, Drury Lane, London

Henry The Second, King Of England; With The Death Of Rosamond is a 1692 historical play often attributed to William Mountfort but possibly written by John Bancroft. It was first staged at the Theatre Royal, Drury Lane by the United Company. The prologue and epilogue were written by John Dryden. Some incidental music was composed by Henry Purcell.

The play portrays the reign of Henry II of England, and his relationship with his wife Eleanor of Aquitaine and mistress Rosamund Clifford.

The original Drury Lane cast included Thomas Betterton as King Henry the Second, Anthony Leigh as Vaughan, Samuel Sandford as Abbot, Edward Kynaston as Verulam, John Hodgson as Sussex, Thomas Doggett as Bertrard, Elizabeth Barry as Queen Eleanor, Anne Bracegirdle as Rosamond and Mary Kent as Rosamond's Woman.

== Bibliography ==
- Van Lennep, W. The London Stage, 1660-1800: Volume One, 1660-1700. Southern Illinois University Press, 1960.
