= The Injured Lovers =

1688 play

- Original language: English
- Written by: William Mountfort
- Genre: Tragedy

Premiere
- Date: February 1688
- Place: Theatre Royal, Drury Lane, London

The Injured Lovers; Or, The Ambitious Father is a 1688 tragedy by the English writer William Mountfort. It was premiered by the United Company at the Theatre Royal, Drury Lane.

The original cast included Thomas Betterton as Rheusanes, Joseph Williams as King of Sicily, Philip Griffin as Ghinotto, William Mountfort as Dorenalus, Samuel Sandford as Old Colonel, Cave Underhill as Soldier, Thomas Jevon as Soldier, Elizabeth Barry as Princess Oryala and Anne Bracegirdle as Antelina.

== Bibliography ==
- Van Lennep, W. The London Stage, 1660-1800: Volume One, 1660-1700. Southern Illinois University Press, 1960.
