= The False Friend; or, the Fate of Disobedience =

1699 she-tragedy written by Mary Pix

- Original language: English
- Written by: Mary Pix
- Genre: She-tragedy

Premiere
- Date: 1699
- Place: Lincoln's Inn Fields

The False Friend; or, the Fate of Disobedience is a she-tragedy written by Mary Pix, and first performed at Lincoln's Inn Fields in 1699. The play is a reworking of William Shakespeare's Othello. The original cast featured John Bowman as Viceroy of Sardinia, John Verbruggen as Emilius, John Thurmond as Lorenzo, John Hodgson as Bucarius, Joseph Harris as Roderigo, Elizabeth Barry as Adellaida, Elizabeth Bowman as Appamia, Anne Bracegirdle as Lovisa, and Abigail Lawson as Zelide.

== Plot ==
The Spanish Emilius has secretly married the French Louisa. The play begins with their safe arrival in Sardinia, where Emilius' father is the Viceroy.

Appamia (Emilius' foster-sister) is also in love with Emilius, and is shocked to hear of his marriage. She hopes to make the couple doubt each other's fidelity, and when this doesn't work, she tricks Emilius into giving Louisa poison. As Louisa convulses in agony, Appamia's plot is revealed to all. A distraught Emilius kills himself, and Louisa dies immediately afterwards. Appamia is taken into custody.

== Portrayal of Appamia ==
Jacqueline Pearson argues that Pix treats Appamia and her desires 'with deep sympathy "...as a result of Pix's sympathy for Appamia - the central emotional pivot, I think, of the play - the character is modeled not only on the evil Iago but also on the heroic Othello". Unlike Shakespeare's Iago, Appamia ultimately repents of her actions, and through her final words, Pix gives the audience a moral message:

"Let me for ever Warn my Sex, and fright 'em from the thoughts of

Black Revenge, from being by Violent Passions

Sway'd. Murder! And am I the cause? Fall Mountains

On this Guilty Head, and let me think no more."

Appamia is closely linked to the Greek mythological figure of Medea: at one point, she explicitly compares herself to Medea; both women murdered their love-rivals with an extremely painful poison. K. Heavey writes that Pix "recognised the dramatic and pathetic potential of a comparison between Medea and a scorned woman".
