= The Relapse =

1696 Restoration comedy by John Vanbrugh

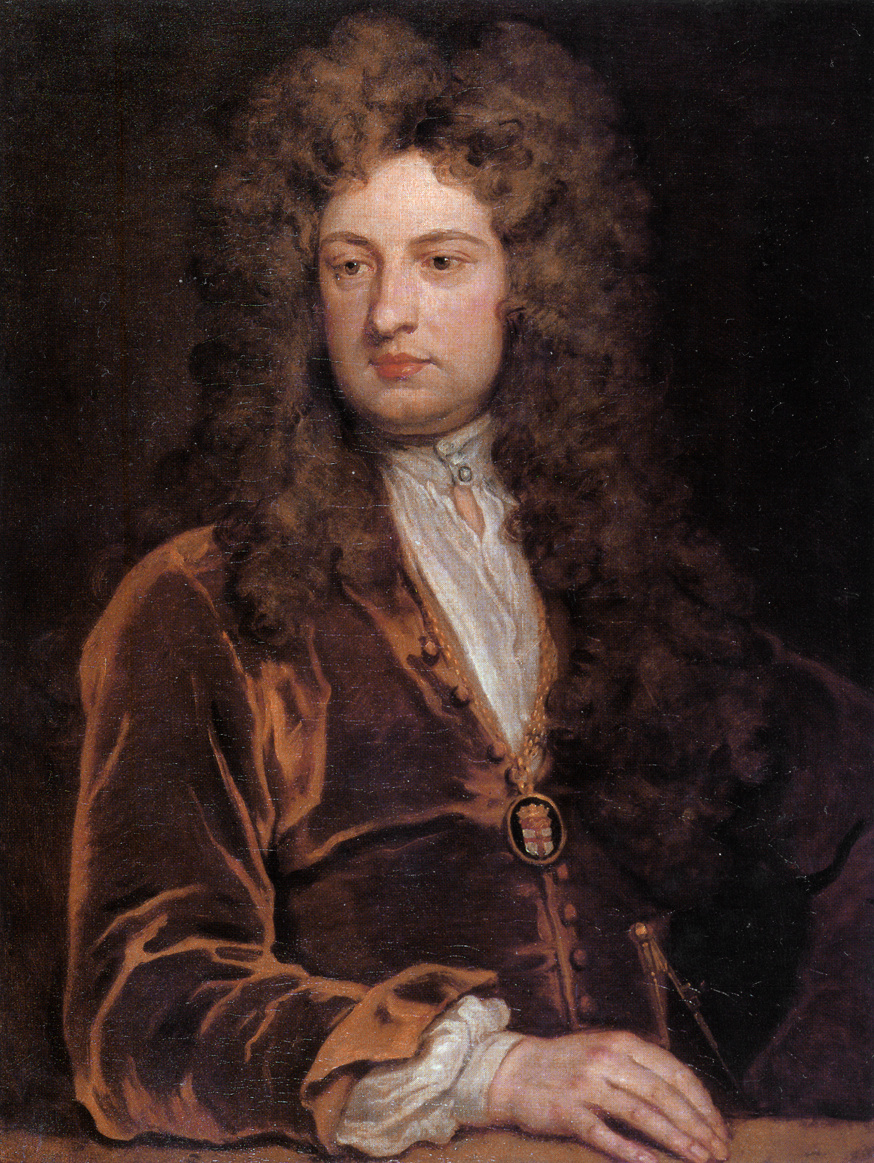
John Vanbrugh (1664–1726), author of The Relapse, by Godfrey Kneller

The Relapse, or, Virtue in Danger is a Restoration comedy from 1696 written by John Vanbrugh. The play is a sequel to Colley Cibber's Love's Last Shift, or, The Fool in Fashion.

In Cibber's Love's Last Shift, a free-living Restoration rake is brought to repentance and reform by the ruses of his wife, while in The Relapse, the rake succumbs again to temptation and has a new love affair. His virtuous wife is also subjected to a determined seduction attempt, and resists with difficulty.

Vanbrugh planned The Relapse around particular actors at Drury Lane, writing their stage habits, public reputations, and personal relationships into the text. One such actor was Colley Cibber himself, who played the luxuriant fop Lord Foppington in both Love's Last Shift and The Relapse. However, Vanbrugh's artistic plans were threatened by a cutthroat struggle between London's two theatre companies, each of which was "seducing" actors from the other. The Relapse came close to being not produced at all, but the successful performance that was eventually achieved in November 1696 vindicated Vanbrugh's intentions, and saved the company from bankruptcy as well.

Unlike Love's Last Shift, which never again performed after the 1690s, The Relapse has retained its audience appeal. In the 18th century, however, its tolerant attitude towards actual and attempted adultery gradually became unacceptable to public opinion, and the original play was for a century replaced on the stage by Sheridan's moralised version A Trip to Scarborough (1777). On the modern stage, The Relapse has been established as one of the most popular Restoration comedies, valued for Vanbrugh's light, throwaway wit and the consummate acting part of Lord Foppington, a burlesque character with a dark side.

== The Relapse as sequel ==
=== Sexual ideology ===
Love's Last Shift can be seen as an early sign of Cibber's sensitivity to shifts of public opinion, which was to be useful to him in his later career as manager at Drury Lane (see Colley Cibber). In the 1690s, the economic and political power balance of the nation tilted from the aristocracy towards the middle class after the Glorious Revolution of 1688, and middle-class values of religion, morality, and gender roles became more dominant, not least in attitudes to the stage. Love's Last Shift is one of the first illustrations of a massive shift in audience taste, away from the analytic bent and sexual frankness of Restoration comedy and towards the conservative certainties and gender role backlash of exemplary or sentimental comedy. The play illustrates Cibber's opportunism at a moment in time before the change was assured: fearless of self-contradiction, he puts something into his first play to please every section of the audience, combining the old outspokenness with the new preachiness. The way Vanbrugh, in his turn, allows the reformed rake to relapse quite cheerfully, and has the only preaching in the play come from the comically corrupt parson of "Fatgoose Living", has made some early 20th-century critics refer to The Relapse as the last of the true Restoration comedies. However, Vanbrugh's play is also affected by the taste of the 1690s, and compared to a play like the courtier William Wycherley's The Country Wife of 20 years earlier, with its celebration of predatory aristocratic masculinity, The Relapse contains quite a few moments of morality and uplift. In fact it has a kind of parallel structure to Love's Last Shift: in the climactic scene of Cibber's play, Amanda's virtue reforms her husband, and in the corresponding scene of The Relapse, it reforms her admirer Worthy. Such moments have not done the play any favours with modern critics.

=== Love's Last Shift plot ===
Love's Last Shift is the story of a last "shift" or trick that a virtuous wife, Amanda, is driven to reform and retain her rakish husband Loveless. Loveless has been away for ten years, dividing his time between the brothel and the bottle, and no longer recognises his wife when he returns to London. Acting the part of a high-class prostitute, Amanda lures Loveless into her luxurious house and treats him to the night of his dreams, confessing her true identity in the morning. Loveless is so impressed that he immediately reforms. A minor part that was a great hit with the première audience is the fop Sir Novelty Fashion, written by Cibber for himself to play. Sir Novelty flirts with all the women, but is more interested in his own exquisite appearance and witticisms, and Cibber would modestly write in his autobiography 45 years later, "was thought a good portrait of the foppery then in fashion". Combining daring sex scenes with sentimental reconciliations and Sir Novelty's buffoonery, Love's Last Shift offered something for everybody, and was a great box-office hit.

=== The Relapse plot ===
Vanbrugh's The Relapse is less sentimental and more analytical than Love's Last Shift, subjecting both the reformed husband and the virtuous wife to fresh temptations, and having them react with more psychological realism. Loveless falls for the vivacious young widow Berinthia, while Amanda barely succeeds in summoning her virtue to reject her admirer Worthy. The three central characters, Amanda, Loveless, and Sir Novelty (ennobled by Vanbrugh into "Lord Foppington"), are the only ones that recur in both plays, the remainder of the Relapse characters being new.

In the trickster subplot, young Tom tricks his elder brother Lord Foppington out of his intended bride and her large dowry. This plot takes up nearly half the play and expands the part of Sir Novelty to give more scope for the roaring success of Cibber's fop acting. Recycling Cibber's merely fashion-conscious fop, Vanbrugh lets him buy himself a title and equips him with enough aplomb and selfishness to weather all humiliations. Although Lord Foppington may be "very industrious to pass for an ass", as Amanda remarks, he is at bottom "a man who Nature has made no fool" (II.i.148). Literary historians agree in esteeming him "the greatest of all Restoration fops" (Dobrée), "brutal, evil, and smart" (Hume).

== Background: theatre company split ==
In the early 1690s, London had only one officially countenanced theatre company, the "United Company", badly managed and with its takings bled off by predatory investors ("adventurers"). To counter the draining of the company's income, the manager Christopher Rich slashed the salaries and traditional perks of his skilled professional actors, antagonising such popular performers as Thomas Betterton, the tragedienne Elizabeth Barry, and the comedian Anne Bracegirdle. Colley Cibber wrote in his autobiography that the owners of the United Company, "who had made a monopoly of the stage, and consequently presumed they might impose what conditions they pleased upon their people, did not consider that they were all this while endeavouring to enslave a set of actors whom the public… were inclined to support." Betterton and his colleagues set forth the bad finances of the United Company and the plight of the actors in a "Petition of the Players" submitted to the Lord Chamberlain. This unusual document is signed by nine men and six women, all established professional actors, and details a disreputable jumble of secret investments and "farmed" shares, making the case that owner chicanery rather than any failure of audience interest was at the root of the company's financial problems. Barely veiled strike threats in the actors' petition were met with an answering lock-out threat from Rich in a "Reply of the Patentees", but the burgeoning conflict was pre-empted by a suspension of all play-acting from December until March 1695 on account of Queen Mary II's illness and death. During this interval, a cooperative actors' company took shape under the leadership of Betterton and was granted a Royal "licence to act" on 25 March, to the dismay of Rich, who saw the threat too late.

The two companies that emerged from this labour/management conflict are usually known respectively as the "Patent Company" (the no-longer-united United Company) and "Betterton's Company", although Judith Milhous argues that the latter misrepresents the cooperative nature of the actors' company. In the following period of intense rivalry, the Patent Company was handicapped by a shortage of competent actors. "Seducing" actors (as the legal term was) back and forth between the companies was a key tactic in the ensuing struggle for position, and so were appeals to the Lord Chamberlain to issue injunctions against seductions from the other side, which that functionary was quite willing to do. Later Rich also resorted to hiring amateurs, and to tempting Irish actors over from Dublin. But such measures were not yet in place for the staging of The Relapse in 1696, Rich's most desperate venture.

== Casting ==
Vanbrugh is assumed to have attempted to tailor his play to the talents of particular actors and to what audiences would expect from them, as was normal practice (Holland), but this was exceptionally difficult to accomplish in 1695–96. Love's Last Shift had been cast from the remnants of the Patent Company—"learners" and "boys and girls"—after the walkout of the stars. Following the surprising success of this young cast, Vanbrugh and Rich had even greater difficulty in retaining the actors needed for The Relapse. However, in spite of the continuous emergency in which the Relapse production was mounted, most of Vanbrugh's original intentions were eventually carried out.

=== Love's Last Shift cast ===
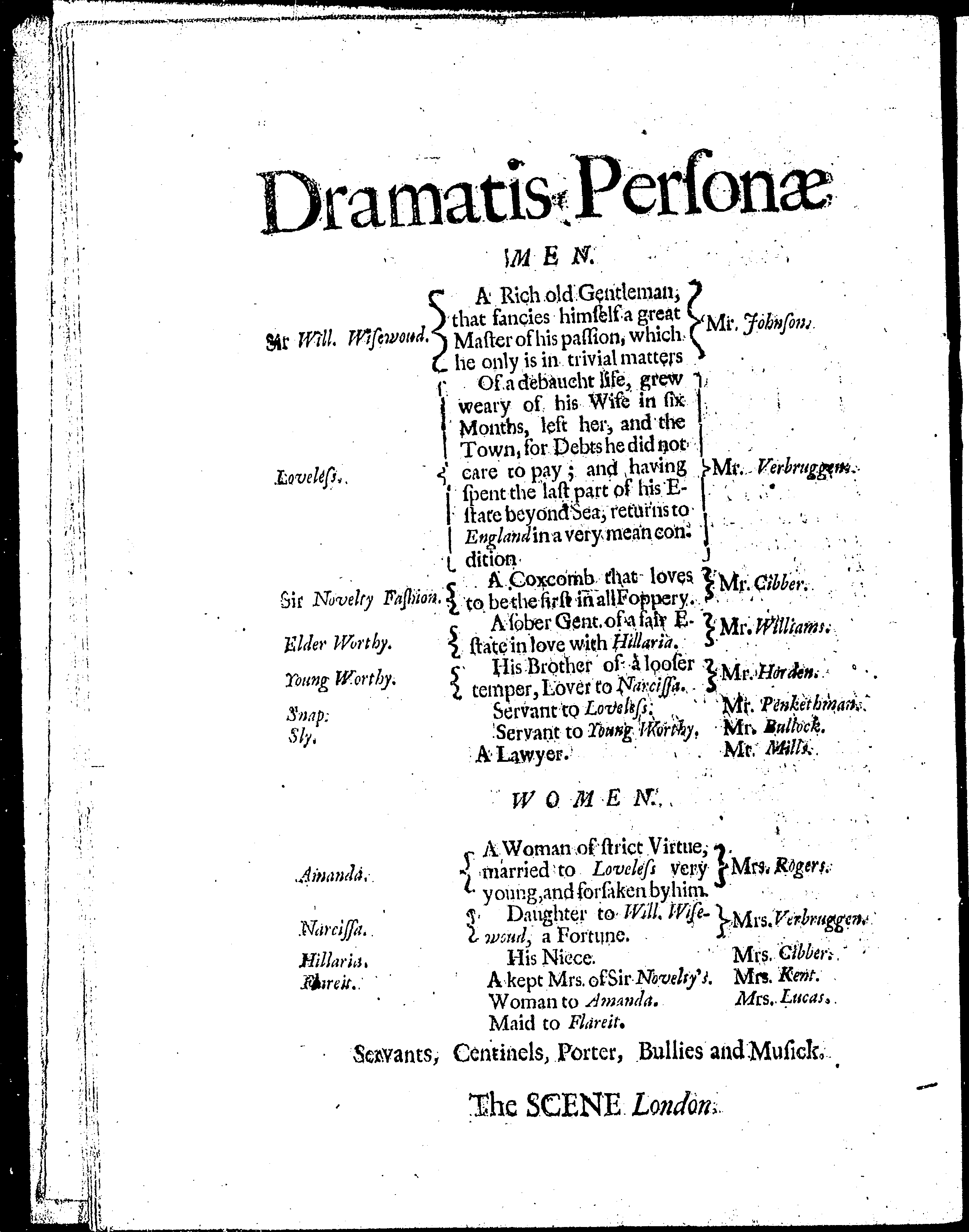
The Love's Last Shift cast list. Please click for larger image.

To cast Love's Last Shift in January 1696, the Patent Company had to make the best use of such actors as remained after the 1694 split (see cast list right). An anonymous contemporary pamphlet describes the "despicable condition" the troupe had been reduced to:

The disproportion was so great at parting, that it was almost impossible, in Drury Lane, to muster up a sufficient number to take in all the parts of any play; and of them so few were tolerable, that a play must of necessity be damned, that had not extraordinary favour from the audience. No fewer than sixteen (most of the old standing) went away; and with them the very beauty and vigour of the stage; they who were left being for the most part learners, boys and girls, a very unequal match for them that revolted.

The only well-regarded performers available were the Verbruggens, John and Susanna, who had been re-seduced by Rich from Betterton's company. They were of course used in Love's Last Shift, with John playing Loveless, the male lead, and his wife Susanna the flirtatious heiress Narcissa, a secondary character. The rest of the cast consisted of the new and untried (for instance Hildebrand Horden, who had just joined Rich's troupe, playing a rakish young lover), the modest and lacklustre (Jane Rogers, playing Amanda, and Mary Kent, playing Sir Novelty's mistress Flareit), and the widely disliked (the opportunist Colley Cibber, playing Sir Novelty Fashion); people who had probably never been given the option of joining Betterton. Betterton's only rival as male lead, George Powell, had most likely been left behind by the rebels with some relief (Milhous); while Powell was skilled and experienced, he was also notorious for his bad temper and alcoholism. Throughout the "seduction" tug-of-war between Rich and Betterton in 1695–96, Powell remained at Drury Lane, where he was in fact not used for Love's Last Shift, but would instead spectacularly demonstrate his drinking problem at the première of The Relapse.

=== The Relapse cast ===
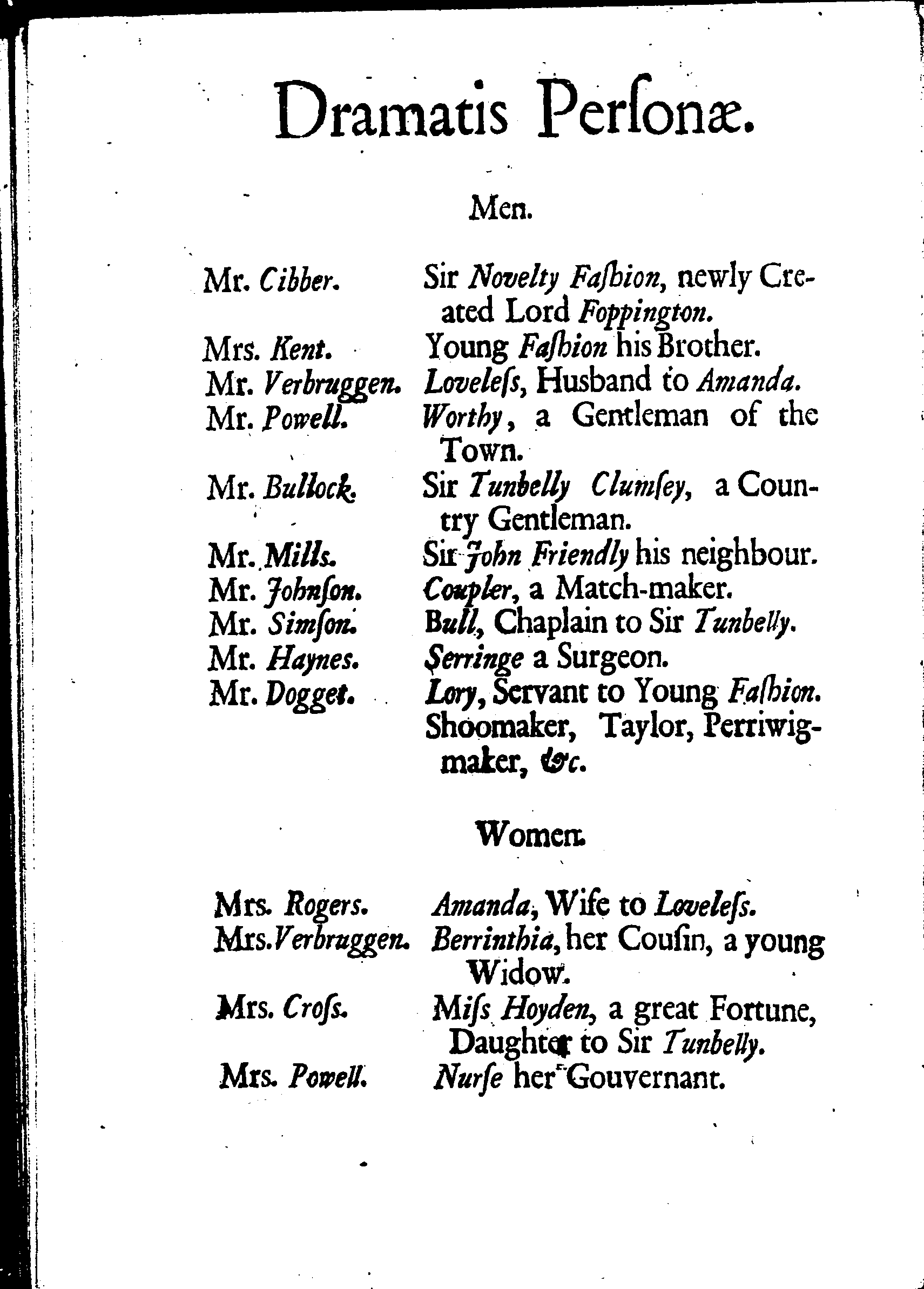
The Relapse cast list. Please click for larger image.

Vanbrugh planned The Relapse, too, round these limited casting resources and minor talents, which Peter Holland has argued explains the robust, farcical character of the play; Vanbrugh's second comedy, The Provoked Wife (1697), written for the better actors of the cooperative company, is a much subtler piece. The Relapse was written in six weeks and offered to the Patent Company in March, but because of the problems with contracting and retaining actors, it did not première until November. It is known from Cibber's autobiography that Vanbrugh had a decisive say in the ongoing casting changes made during these seven months; it is not known whether he altered his text to accommodate them.

To reinforce the connection with Love's Last Shift and capitalise on its unexpected success, Vanbrugh designed the central roles of Loveless, Amanda, and Sir Novelty for the same actors: John Verbruggen, Jane Rogers, and Colley Cibber. Keeping Rogers as Amanda was not a problem, since she was not an actress that the companies fought over, but holding on to John Verbruggen and Colley Cibber posed challenges, to which Rich rose with energetic campaigns of bribery and re-seduction. Filling the rest of the large Relapse cast presented a varied palette of problems, which forced some unconventional emergency casting.

John Verbruggen was one of the original rebels and had been offered a share in the actors' company, but became disgruntled when his wife Susanna, a popular comedian, was not. For Rich, it was a stroke of luck to get Susanna and John back into his depleted and unskilled troupe. John's availability to play Loveless remained precarious, however. In September, when The Relapse had still not been staged after six months of trying (probably because Rich was still parleying with Cibber about his availability as Lord Foppington), John was still complaining about his employment situation, even getting into a physical fight over it at the theatre. This misbehaviour caused the Lord Chamberlain to declare his contract void and at the same time order him to stay with the Patent Company until January 1697, to give Rich time to find a replacement. The original Loveless was thus finally guaranteed for an autumn season run of The Relapse. Since the loyal Verbruggen couple always moved as a unit, Susanna's services were also assured.

The Verbruggens were essential to the play, not least because Vanbrugh had customised the sprightly temptress Berinthia to Susanna's talents and reputation for witty, roguish, sexually enterprising characters, most recently Mrs Buxom in Thomas D'Urfey's Don Quixote (a success thanks to "the extraordinary well acting of Mrs Verbruggen", wrote D'Urfey). Although John was less well known, his acting skills were considerable and would flourish after January 1697 in the cooperative company, where commentators even started to compare him with the great Betterton. Verbruggen was considered a more natural, intuitive or "careless" actor, with "a negligent agreeable wildness in his action and his mien, which became him well." Anthony Aston vividly described Verbruggen as "a little in-kneed, which gave him a shambling gait, which was a carelessness, and became him." Modern critics do not find the Loveless part very lively or irresistible, but Vanbrugh was able to count on Verbruggen's shambling male magnetism and "agreeable wildness" to enrich the character. This would originally have worked even in print, since cast lists were included in the published plays: most 1690s play readers were playgoers also, and aware of the high-profile Verbruggens. Happily married in private life and playing the secret lovers Loveless and Berinthia, the Verbruggens have left traces of their charisma and erotic stage presences in Vanbrugh's dialogue. The Relapse even alludes to their real-life relationship, in meta-jokes such as Berinthia's exclamation, "Well, he is a charming man! I don't wonder his wife's so fond of him!"

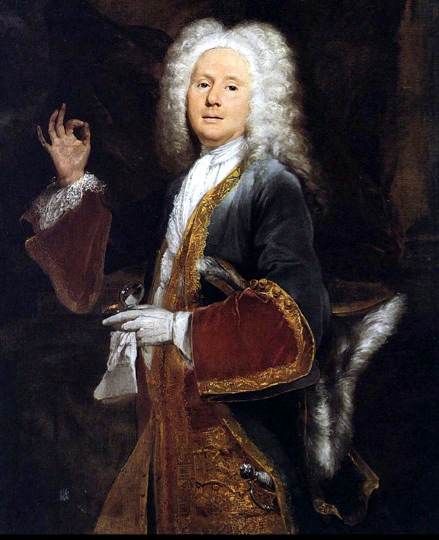
Young Colley Cibber as Vanbrugh's Lord Foppington, "brutal, evil, and smart"

Hildebrand Horden, who had played a "wild" young lover in Love's Last Shift, was the only young, handsome, potential romantic lead Rich had. He was presumably cast by Vanbrugh as Tom Fashion, Lord Foppington's clever younger brother (Holland), and it was a blow to the Patent Company when he was killed in a tavern brawl (more glamorously referred to as a "duel" in older sources) in May. At the première in November, Tom Fashion was instead played as a breeches role by Mary Kent, an unusual piece of emergency casting that puts a different face on a uniquely frank homosexual scene where Tom keeps skipping nimbly out of the way of the matchmaker Coupler's lecherous groping.

Colley Cibber was a rather unsuccessful young actor at the time of the split, with a squeaky voice and without any of the physical attractiveness of the soon-to-be-dead Horden. After the success of Love's Last Shift, his status was transformed, with both companies vying for his services as actor and playwright. He made an off-season transfer to Betterton's company in the summer of 1696 and wrote part of a play for the rebels before being re-seduced by Rich by means of a fat contract (Milhous). Cibber as Lord Foppington was thus also assured, and finally the première of The Relapse could be scheduled with some confidence. Cibber's performance in it was received with even greater acclaim than in his own play, Vanbrugh's Lord Foppington being a larger and, in the estimation of both contemporaries and modern critics, much funnier part than Sir Novelty Fashion. Vanbrugh's play incorporates some of the ad-libbing and affectations of Cibber's by all accounts inspired performance in Love's Last Shift. Cibber has thus imprinted not only his own playwriting but also his acting style and squeaky personality on Vanbrugh's best-known character.

Vanbrugh's preface to the first edition preserves a single fleeting concrete detail about the première performance: George Powell was drunk. He played Amanda's worldly and sophisticated admirer Worthy, the "fine gentleman of the play", and apparently brought an unintended hands-on realism to his supposedly suave seduction attempt:

One word more about the bawdy, and I have done. I own the first night this thing was acted, some indecencies had like to have happened, but it was not my fault. The fine gentleman of the play, drinking his mistress's health in Nantes brandy from six in the morning to the time he waddled upon the stage in the evening, had toasted himself up to such a pitch of vigour, I confess I once gave Amanda for gone.

== Stage history ==
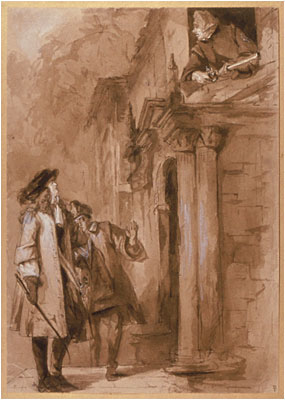
Trickster subplot in The Relapse: Tom Fashion, pretending to be Lord Foppington, parleys with Sir Tunbelly Clumsey in a 19th-century illustration by William Powell Frith.

The desperate straits of the United Company, and the success of The Relapse in saving it from collapse, are attested in a private letter from 19 November 1696: "The other house [Drury Lane] has no company at all, and unless a new play comes out on Saturday revives their reputation, they must break." The new play is assumed to have been The Relapse, and it turned out the success Rich needed. "This play", notes Colley Cibber in his autobiography, "from its new and easy turn of wit, had great success, and gave me, as a comedian, a second flight of reputation along with it." Charles Gildon summarises: "This play was received with mighty applause."

The Relapse is singled out for particular censure in the Puritan clergyman Jeremy Collier's anti-theatre pamphlet Short View of the Immorality and Profaneness of the English Stage (1698), which attacks its lack of poetic justice and moral sentiment. Worthy and Berinthia, complains Collier, are allowed to enact their wiles against the Lovelesses' married virtue without being punished or losing face. The subplot is an even worse offence against religion and morality, as it positively rewards vice, allowing the trickster hero Tom to keep the girl, her dowry, and his own bad character to the end. Vanbrugh failed to take Short View seriously and published a joking reply, but Collier's censure was to colour the perception of the play for centuries. While it remained a popular stage piece through the 18th century, much praised and enjoyed for its wit, attitudes to its casual sexual morality became increasingly ambivalent as public opinion became ever more restrictive in this area, and more at odds with the permissive ethos of Restoration comedy. From 1777 Vanbrugh's original was replaced on the stage by Sheridan's A Trip to Scarborough, a close adaptation but with some "covering", as the prologue explains, drawn over Vanbrugh's "too bare" wit:

As change thus circulates throughout the nation,
Some plays may justly call for alteration;
At least to draw some slender covering o'er,
That graceless wit which was too bare before.

Sheridan does not allow Loveless and Berinthia to consummate their relationship, and he withdraws approval from Amanda's admirer Worthy by renaming him "Townly". Some frank quips are silently deleted, and the matchmaker Coupler with the lecherous interest in Tom becomes decorous Mrs Coupler. A small-scale but notable loss is of much of the graphic language of Hoyden's nurse, who is earthy in Vanbrugh's original, genteel in Sheridan. However, Sheridan had an appreciation of Vanbrugh's style, and retained most of the original text unaltered.

In the 19th century, A Trip to Scarborough remained the standard version, and there were also some ad hoc adaptations that sidelined the Lovelesses' drawing-room comedy in favour of the Lord Foppington/Hoyden plot with its caricatured clashes between exquisite fop and pitchfork-wielding country bumpkins. The Man of Quality (1870) was one such robust production, Miss Tomboy (1890) another. Vanbrugh's original Relapse was staged once, in 1846, at the Olympic Theatre in London.

During the first half of the 20th century The Relapse was relatively neglected, along with other Restoration drama, and experts are uncertain about exactly when Vanbrugh's original again resurged to prominence on the stage and thereby marginalised Sheridan's version. These experts now believe the play may have been first brilliantly rehabilitated by Anthony Quayle's 1947 production at the Phoenix Theatre, starring Cyril Ritchard as Lord Foppington and brought to Broadway by Ritchard in 1950. A musical version, Virtue in Danger (1963), by Paul Dehn with music by James Bernard, opened to mixed reviews. John Russell Taylor in Plays and Players praised the cast, which included Patricia Routledge as Berinthia and John Moffatt as Lord Foppington, but complained that the production was "full of the simpering, posturing and sniggering which usually stand in for style and sophistication in Restoration revivals." Following Donald Sinden's outstanding and award-winning performance at the Aldwych Theatre in the mid-1960s Vanbrugh's original play is now again a favourite of the stage. A 2001 revival by Trevor Nunn at the National Theatre was described by Sheridan Morley as "rare, loving and brilliantly cast." As so often with commentary on The Relapse, Morley focused on the role of Lord Foppington and its different interpretations: "Alex Jennings superbly inherits the role of Lord Foppington which for 20 years or so belonged to Donald Sinden, and for another 20 before that to Cyril Ritchard."

Restoration Comedy, a play by Amy Freed that draws on both The Relapse and its predecessor, Colley Cibber's Love's Last Shift, premiered at Seattle Repertory Theatre in 2005, starring Stephen Caffrey as Loveless, Caralyn Kozlowski as Amanda, and Jonathan Freeman as Lord Foppington, and directed by Sharon Ott.
