= Love's Victim =

1701 play

- Written by: Charles Gildon
- Original language: English
- Genre: Tragedy

Premiere
- Date premiered: April 1701
- Place premiered: Lincoln's Inn Fields Theatre, London

Love's Victim: or, the Queen of Wales is a 1701 tragedy by the English writer Charles Gildon.

The original cast included Thomas Betterton as Rhesus, Mary Porter as Tyrelius, George Pack as Morganius, Barton Booth as King of Bayonne, John Bowman as Druid, John Hodgson as Dumnacus, Anne Bracegirdle as Guinoenda, Elizabeth Barry as Queen of Bayonne and Mary Willis as Manselia. The epilogue was written by William Burnaby.

== Bibliography ==
- Burling, William J. A Checklist of New Plays and Entertainments on the London Stage, 1700-1737. Fairleigh Dickinson Univ Press, 1992.
- Marsden, Jean I. Fatal Desire: Women, Sexuality, and the English Stage, 1660–1720. Cornell University Press, 2018.
