= The Comical History of Don Quixote =

1694 dramatization of Don Quixote

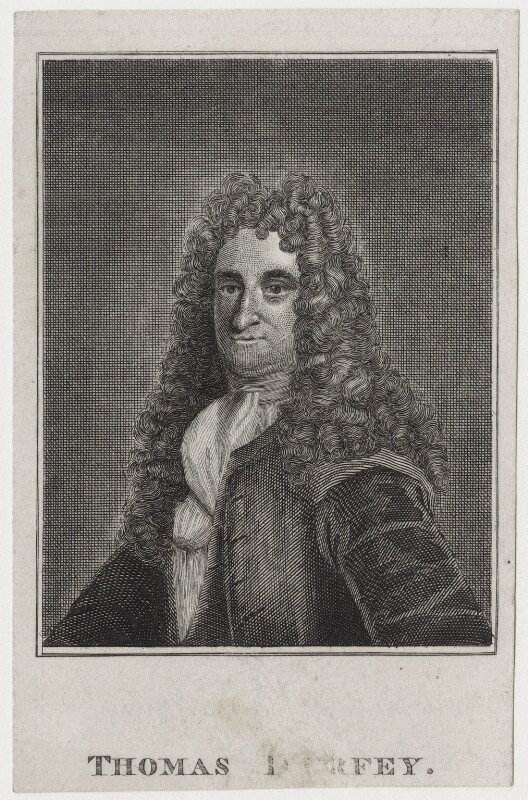
- Written by: Thomas D'Urfey
- Based on: Don Quixote
- Music by: Henry Purcell and John Eccles
- Genre: Comedy

The Comical History of Don Quixote is a three-part dramatization of Miguel de Cervantes's celebrated novel Don Quixote.

It was written in 1694, only seventy-eight years after the death of Cervantes, by Thomas D'Urfey. It is one of the first stage dramatizations of "Don Quixote" ever written. The piece featured many songs, most of them by Henry Purcell, but there were some by other noted Restoration composers. Composer John Eccles wrote the aria "I burn" for soprano Anne Bracegirdle which became a tremendous success for the actress and became a staple work in her stage repertoire.

The complete work itself, according to writer-director Don Taylor, is actually three separate plays, and in total takes more than seven hours to perform. It is seldom, if ever, revived today, and was not a success at its premiere, although some of Purcell's compositions for it (From rosy bow'rs, for instance) have become fairly well known. A highly-abridged early revival of it (with full orchestral accompaniment) took place at the 1938 Bath Music Festival. In 1994, an attempt was made at "reconstructing" it, in a version entitled Don Quixote: The Musical. This edition featured much of the play's original music, but used an entirely new libretto (in fairly modern English) written by Taylor, and setting the story as a play within a play, with D'Urfey and others appearing as characters in it. The production starred Paul Scofield as Don Quixote, and Roy Hudd as Sancho Panza.
