= Anne Bracegirdle =

British actress (1671-1748)

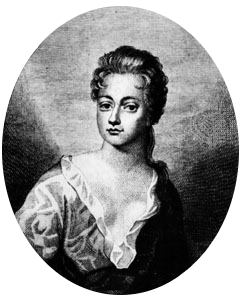

Anne Bracegirdle (possibly 1671 – 12 September 1748) was an English actress and soprano. Most of the plays she performed in involved singing as well as acting. She often performed music written for her by the composer John Eccles, and also sang music written for her by Henry Purcell. She became particularly well known for the song "I burn" which Eccles originally wrote for Bracegirdle to perform in Thomas D'Urfey's play The Comical History of Don Quixote (1694). She also sang music by Eccles in the play The Richmond Heiress (1693) and in William Congreve opera The Judgment of Paris (1701, as Venus). In 1706 she starred in Giuseppe Fedeli's opera The Temple of Love.

== Biography ==
Bracegirdle was born to Justinian and Martha (born Furniss) Bracegirdle in Northamptonshire. She was baptised in Northampton on 15 November 1671, although her tombstone says that she died at the age of 85 (suggesting that she was born around 1663). She was probably raised by actors Thomas and Mary Betterton from an early age, and it is speculated that she was the "little girl" referred to several times in playbills before 1688 for the Duke's Company, where Thomas Betterton was the big star. For this reason it has been concluded by the Garrick Club that 1673 is the date of her birth.

Her name first appears in the Lord Chamberlain's accounts in 1688 as a member of the United Company (into which the Duke's Company had by then merged), and a few of her roles in the following years are known through surviving manuscript cast lists. She played Semernia in Aphra Behn's The Widow Ranter in 1689, a breeches role, a type of role she would often return to, and was by 1690 playing parts like Lady Anne in Shakespeare's Richard III and Desdemona in Othello. She performed many of the lead female roles in the plays of William Congreve. Soon, she had become one of the important members of the company and an audience favourite, indicated by the frequency with which she spoke prologues and epilogues.

In 1705 she played in Nicholas Rowe's tragedy Ulysses.

After 1705 she found a serious competitor in Anne Oldfield, then first coming into public favour. As it became apparent that audiences preferred her rival, Anne Bracegirdle quit the stage, making only one reappearance at Betterton's benefit in 1709.

== Cibber's account ==
Colley Cibber described Bracegirdle in his autobiography as she appeared in 1690, when he first joined the company at Drury Lane:

She had no greater Claim to Beauty than what the most desirable Brunette might pretend to. But her Youth and lively Aspect threw out such a Glow of Health and Chearfulness, that on the Stage few Spectators that were not past it could behold her without Desire. It was even a Fashion among the Gay and Young to have a Taste or Tendre for Mrs. Bracegirdle… In all the chief Parts she acted, the Desirable was so predominant, that no Judge could be cold enough to consider from what other particular Excellence she became delightful.

Cibber was smitten. He describes his own highest acting ambition (never fulfilled) as a new and inconspicuous company employee to have been that of "playing a Lover with Mrs. Bracegirdle". In 1692, the "tendre" felt by both Captain Richard Hill and the actor William Mountfort caused a celebrated tragedy. The jealous Hill and a gang of toughs led by the infamous Lord Mohun attempted to abduct Anne and murdered Mountfort, her presumed lover, in the street. Hill made his escape from justice, but Mohun stood trial and was acquitted. Both died violent deaths years later. It was said that the publicity assisted her career and she was still called the "celebrated virgin" in 1702.

Bracegirdle made a request to be buried in Westminster Abbey, a wish that was fulfilled.

== Selected roles ==
- Antelina in The Injured Lovers by William Mountfort (1688)
- Semernia in The Widow Ranter by Aphra Behn (1689)
- Urania in Alphonso, King of Naples by George Powell (1690)
- Biancha in The Successful Strangers by Thomas Shadwell (1690)
- Cleomira in Distressed Innocence by Elkanah Settle (1690)
- Maria in Edward III by William Mountfort (1690)
- Miranda in The Mistakes by Joseph Harris (1690)
- Charlotte in Sir Anthony Love by Thomas Southerne (1690)
- Julia in The English Frier by John Crowne (1690)
- Marcelia in The Treacherous Brothers by George Powell (1690)
- Emmeline in King Arthur by John Dryden (1691)
- Tamira in Bussy D'Ambois by Thomas D'Urfey (1691)
- Mrs Sightly in The Wives Excuse by Thomas Southerne (1691)
- Mirtilla in Love for Money by Thomas D'Urfey (1691)
- Cleora in Cleomenes, the Spartan Hero by John Dryden (1692)
- Rosamund in Henry II by William Mountfort (1692)
- Phoebe in The Marriage-Hater Matched by Thomas D'Urfey (1692)
- Clara in The Volunteers by Thomas Shadwell (1692)
- Araminta in The Old Bachelor by William Congreve (1693)
- Lady Trickitt in The Maid's Last Prayer by Thomas Southerne (1693)
- Mariana in The Female Virtuosos by Thomas Wright (1693)
- Fulvia in The Richmond Heiress by Thomas D'Urfey (1693)
- Camilla in The Married Beau by John Crowne (1694)
- Celidea in Love Triumphant by John Dryden (1694)
- Clarismunda in The Ambitious Slave by Elkanah Settle (1694)
- Villeria in The Fatal Marriage by Thomas Southerne (1694)
- Angelica in Love for Love by William Congreve (1695)
- Angelica in The She-Gallants by George Granville (1695)
- Lausaria in Cyrus the Great by John Banks (playwright) (1695)
- Belinda in The Provoked Wife by John Vanbrugh (1696)
- Camilla in Boadicea, Queen of Britain by Charles Hopkins (1697)
- Mrs Beauclair in The Innocent Mistress by Mary Pix (1697)
- Placentia in Beauty in Distress by Peter Anthony Motteux (1698)
- Lucia in The Squire of Alsatia by Thomas Shadwell (1698)
- Locris in Friendship Improved by Charles Hopkins (1699)
- Lovisa in The False Friend by Mary Pix (1699)
- Amestris in The Ambitious Stepmother by Nicholas Rowe (1700)
- Millamant in The Way of the World by William Congreve (1700)
- Guinoenda in Love's Victim by Charles Gildon (1701)
- Fulvia in The Ladies Visiting Day by William Burnaby (1701)
- Cytheria in The Double Distress by Mary Pix (1701)
- Selima in Tamerlane by Nicholas Rowe (1701)
- Orinda in As You Find It by Charles Boyle (1703)
- Caesario in Love Betrayed by William Burnaby (1703)
- Angelica in The Gamester by Susanna Centlivre (1705)
- Flippanta in The Confederacy by John Vanbrugh (1705)
- Semanthe in Ulysses by Nicholas Rowe (1705)
- Lucindain The Platonick Lady by Susanna Centlivre (1706)
- Laura in Adventures in Madrid by Mary Pix (1706)

== Sources ==
- Cibber, Colley (first published 1740, ed. Robert Lowe, 1889). An Apology for the Life of Colley Cibber, vol.1, vol 2. London.
- Chisholm, Hugh, ed. (1911). "Bracegirdle, Anne" . Encyclopædia Britannica. Vol. 4 (11th ed.). Cambridge University Press. pp. 358–359. This cites:
  - Genest, History of the Stage
  - Colley Gibber, Apology (edited by Bellchambers)
  - Egerton, Life of Anne Oldfield
  - Downes, Roscius Anglicanus
- Highfill, Philip Jr, Burnim, Kalman A., and Langhans, Edward (1973–93). Biographical Dictionary of Actors, Actresses, Musicians, Dancers, Managers and Other Stage Personnel in London, 1660–1800. 16 volumes. Carbondale, Illinois: Southern Illinois University Press.
- Howe, Elizabeth (1992). The First English Actresses: Women and Drama 1660–1700. Cambridge: Cambridge University Press.
