= The She-Gallants =

1695 play

- Original language: English
- Written by: George Granville
- Genre: Restoration Comedy
- Setting: London, present day

Premiere
- Date: December 1695
- Place: Lincoln's Inn Fields Theatre, London

The She-Gallants is a 1695 comedy play by the English writer George Granville. It was first staged by Thomas Betterton's Company at the Lincoln's Inn Fields Theatre in London.

The original cast included Thomas Betterton as Bellamour, John Hodgson as Philabel, John Thurmond as Frederick, Cave Underhill as Sir Toby Cusifle, William Bowen as Sir John Aery, Thomas Doggett as Vaunter, Samuel Bailey as Courtall, Elizabeth Barry as Lady Dorimen, Anne Bracegirdle as Angelica, Elizabeth Boutell as Constantia, Elizabeth Bowman as Lucinda and Elinor Leigh as Plackett.

== Bibliography ==
- Stayn, J.L. Restoration Comedy in Performance. Cambridge University Press, 1986.
- Van Lennep, W. The London Stage, 1660-1800: Volume One, 1660-1700. Southern Illinois University Press, 1960.
