= Beauty in Distress =

1698 play

- Written by: Peter Anthony Motteux
- Original language: English
- Genre: Tragedy

Premiere
- Date premiered: April 1698
- Place premiered: Lincoln's Inn Fields Theatre

Beauty in Distress is a 1698 tragedy by the English writer Peter Anthony Motteux.

The original Lincoln's Inn Fields cast included Thomas Betterton as Don Vincentio, John Verbruggen as Ricardo, Edward Kynaston as Duke Ferdinand, John Hodgson as Fabiano, Elizabeth Barry as Laura, Anne Bracegirdle as Placentia and Henrietta Moore as Morella.

== Bibliography ==
- Lowerre, Kathryn. Music and Musicians on the London Stage, 1695-1705. Routledge, 2017.
- Watson, George. The New Cambridge Bibliography of English Literature: Volume 2, 1660-1800. Cambridge University Press, 1971.
