= Hildebrand Horden =

Hildebrand Horden (died 1696) was a London actor. He joined the United Company in 1694, just before it split in two as the senior actors, headed by Thomas Betterton, walked out and set up a cooperative company in Lincoln's Inn Fields. As he was young and untried, it is unlikely that Horden was invited to join them; at any rate, he remained with the United Company, where he rose into favour with audiences, speaking more than half of the recorded play prologues (a sign of success and prestige). On 18 May 1696 he was killed, at a young age, in a tavern brawl, by Elizeus Burges.

Colley Cibber, who worked at the company at the same time, describes Horden in his autobiography:

"This young man had almost every natural gift that could promise an excellent actor; he had besides a good deal of table-wit and humour, with a handsome person, and was every day rising into public favour. Before he was buried, it was observable that two or three days together several of the fair sex, well dressed, came in masks (then frequently worn) and some in their own coaches, to visit this theatrical hero in his shroud."

== See also ==
- The Relapse
