= The Fate of Capua =

Play by Thomas Southerne

- Original language: English
- Written by: Thomas Southerne
- Genre: Tragedy

Premiere
- Date: April 1700
- Place: Lincoln's Inn Fields Theatre

The Fate of Capua is a 1700 tragedy by the writer Thomas Southerne. In Ancient Capua the rival Roman and Cartheginian factions vie for influence.

The original cast included John Hodgson as Pacuvius Calavius, Thomas Betterton as Virginius, John Bowman as Magius, John Verbruggen as Junius and Elizabeth Barry as Favonia. The prologue was written by Charles Boyle.

== Bibliography ==
- Lowerre, Kathryn. Music and Musicians on the London Stage, 1695-1705. Routledge, 2017.
- Nicoll, Allardyce. History of English Drama, 1660-1900, Volume 2. Cambridge University Press, 2009.
