= The Italian Husband =

1697 play

- Original language: English
- Written by: Edward Ravenscroft
- Genre: Tragedy

Premiere
- Date: November 1697
- Place: Lincoln's Inn Fields Theatre, London

The Italian Husband is a 1697 tragedy by the English writer Edward Ravenscroft. It was first staged by Thomas Betterton's company at the Lincoln's Inn Fields Theatre in London.

The original cast included John Verbruggen as Frederico, Elizabeth Bowman as Alouisia, John Hodgson as Alfonso, John Thurmond as Rodrigo, Marmaduke Watson as Fidalbo and John Bowman as Haynes.

== Bibliography ==
- Van Lennep, W. The London Stage, 1660–1800: Volume One, 1660–1700. Southern Illinois University Press, 1960.
