= John Bancroft (dramatist) =

John Bancroft (died 1696) was an English dramatist, by profession a surgeon. He was buried in St. Paul's Church, Covent Garden.

== Works ==
He is said to have had a good practice among frequenters of the theatres, and to have been led to write for the stage. One tragedy, the materials for which are drawn from Plutarch, is unquestionably his. This is Sertorius, which was licensed for performance 10 March 1678–79, and was printed in 1679. It was played in the same year at the Theatre Royal, subsequently known as Drury Lane. Henry the Second, King of England, with the Death of Rosamond, produced in 1692 at the Theatre Royal, is also assigned to Bancroft, though the dedication is signed "Will. Mountfort, 1693" a date subsequent to William Mountfort's murder. Henry the Second was printed in 1693. It is included in Six Plays written by Mr. Mountfort in two volumes, London: printed for Jacob Tonson, George Strahan and William Mears, 1720.

Thomas Coxeter, by whom the materials were collected for Theophilus Cibber's Lives of the Poets, attributes to Bancroft King Edward the Third with the Fall of Mortimer, Earl of March, published in 4to 1691, and also included in the collection of Mountfort. He states that Bancroft made a present to Mountfort, both of the reputation and profits of the piece. In the bookseller's preface to Mountfort's collected works it is said of these two dramas that 'tho' not wholly composed by him, it is presumed he had, at least, a share in fitting them for the stage.
