= Love for Love =

1695 play by William Congreve

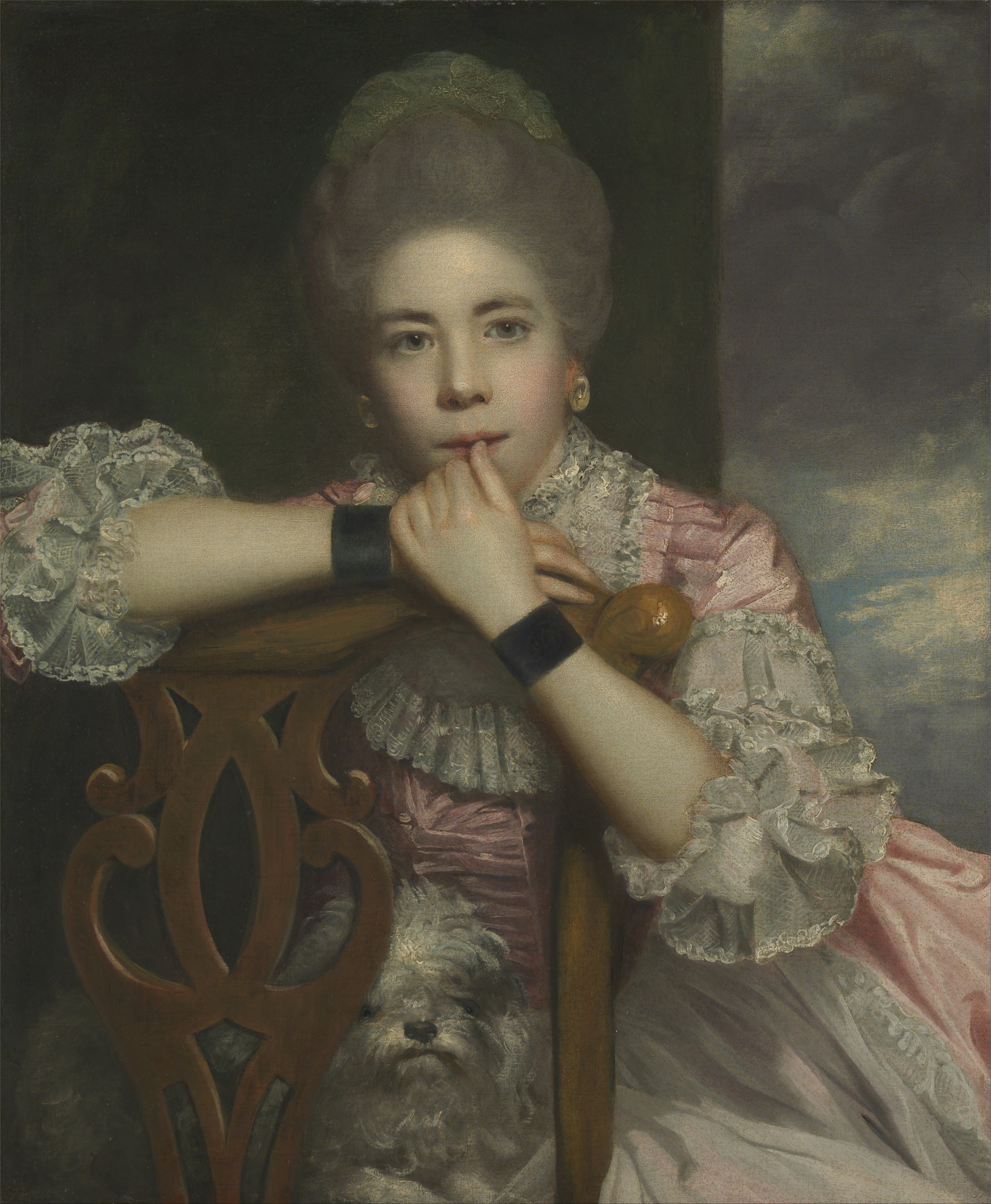
- Joshua Reynolds' Mrs. Abington as Miss Prue in "Love for Love" by William Congreve, 1771
- Written by: William Congreve
- Original language: English
- Genre: Restoration Comedy

Premiere
- Date premiered: 30 April 1695
- Place premiered: Theatre Royal, Drury Lane, London

Love for Love is a Restoration comedy written by English playwright William Congreve. It premiered on 30 April 1695 at the Lincoln's Inn Fields Theatre. Staged by Thomas Betterton's company, the original cast included Betterton as Valentine, William Smith as Scandal, John Bowman as Tattle, Thomas Doggett as Ben, Samuel Sandford as Foresight, William Bowen as Jeremy, John Freeman as Buckram, Anne Bracegirdle as Angelica, Elizabeth Bowman as Mrs Foresight, Elizabeth Barry as Mrs Frail, Elinor Leigh as Nurse and Abigail Lawson as Jenny.

== Characters ==
The play is a comical farce relying on witty dialogue and humorous characters, and was perhaps more successful in its day than the possibly more renowned The Way of the World. The main characters are Valentine; Jeremy, Valentine's resourceful servant; Sir Sampson, with his 'blunt vivacity'; Ben, the rough young mariner, who intends to marry whom he chooses; Miss Prue, who is interested in Tattle, the vain, half-witted beau, who finds himself married to Mrs. Frail, when he thinks he has wedded Angelica; and Foresight, the gullible old astrologer.

=== Dramatis Personae ===
- Sir Sampson Legend, father to Valentine and Ben
- Valentine, fallen under his father's displeasure by his expensive way of living, in love with Angelica
- Scandal, his friend, a free speaker
- Tattle, a half-witted beau, vain of his amours, yet valuing himself for secrecy
- Ben, Sir Sampson's younger son, half home-bred and half sea-bred, designed to marry Miss Prue
- Foresight, an illiterate old fellow, peevish and positive, superstitious, and pretending to understand astrology, palmistry, physiognomy, omens, dreams, etc., uncle to Angelica
- Jeremy, servant to Valentine
- Trapland, a scrivener
- Buckram, a lawyer
- Angelica, niece to Foresight, of a considerable fortune in her own hands
- Mrs. Foresight, second wife to Foresight
- Mrs. Frail, sister to Mrs. Foresight, a woman of the town
- Miss Prue, daughter to Foresight by a former wife, a silly, awkward country girl
- Nurse, to Miss Prue
- Jenny, maid to Angelica
- A Steward, Officers, Sailors, and several servants

== Plot ==
Valentine has fallen under the displeasure of his father by his extravagance, and is besieged by creditors. His father, Sir Sampson Legend, offers him £4,000, only enough to pay his debts, if he will sign a bond engaging to make over his right to his inheritance to his younger brother Ben. Valentine, to escape from his embarrassment, signs the bond. He is in love with Angelica, who possesses a fortune of her own, but so far she has not yielded to his suit.

Sir Sampson has arranged a match between Ben, who is at sea, and Miss Prue, an awkward country girl, the daughter of Foresight, a superstitious old fool who claims to be an astrologer. Valentine, realizing the ruin entailed by the signature of the bond, tries to move his father by submission, and fails; then pretends to be mad and unable to sign the final deed of conveyance to his brother.

Finally Angelica intervenes. She induces Sir Sampson to propose marriage to her, pretends to accept, and gets possession of Valentine's bond. When Valentine, in despair at finding that Angelica is about to marry his father, declares himself ready to sign the conveyance, she reveals the plot, tears up the bond, and declares her love for Valentine.
