= Boadicea, Queen of Britain =

1697 play

- Written by: Charles Hopkins
- Original language: English
- Genre: Tragedy

Premiere
- Date premiered: November 1697
- Place premiered: Lincoln's Inn Fields Theatre, London

Boadicea, Queen of Britain is a 1697 tragedy by the English writer Charles Hopkins. Based on the story of Boudica the British ruler who revolted against Roman Rule, it was first staged by Thomas Betterton's company at the Lincoln's Inn Fields Theatre in London.

The original Lincoln's Inn Fields cast included Elizabeth Barry as Boadicea, Anne Bracegirdle as Camilla, Elizabeth Bowman as Venutia, Thomas Betterton as Cassibelan, Edward Kynaston as Paulinus, John Hodgson as Decius, John Freeman as Fabian and Samuel Sandford as Caska.

== Bibliography ==
- Van Lennep, W. The London Stage, 1660-1800: Volume One, 1660-1700. Southern Illinois University Press, 1960.
