= The Mourning Bride =

1697 play by William Congreve

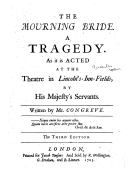
- Frontispiece of The Mourning Bride (1703)
- Original language: English
- Written by: William Congreve
- Subject: Restoration comedy, tragedy
- Genre: Comedy, satire
- Setting: London

Premiere
- Date: 1697
- Place: Lincoln's Inn Fields

The Mourning Bride, originally titled as The Mourning Bride: A Tragedy, is a tragedy satire play written by the English playwright William Congreve. It premiered in 1697 at Lincoln's Inn Fields, London. It revolves around the secret love between Almeria, the daughter of King Manuel of Granada, and Alphonso, the son of King Anselmo of Valencia, who is her father's enemy. The play was popular for its satirical qualities during the Restoration period, and is notable for being the source of the (slightly reworded) adage, "Hell hath no fury like a woman scorned".

The play, set in Granada, includes many different themes, including those of love, betrayal, faith and revenge. The characters of Almeria and Alphonso are secretly married. Their marriage is tragically cut short when they are separated following a shipwreck, leading Almeria to believe that Alphonso is dead. Alphonso disguises himself as Osmyn and tries to return but is found and captured. However, the queen Zara falls in love with Osmyn, unaware of his real name and identity or his existing marriage to Almeria. The play then narrates his efforts to reunite with Almeria, fighting against the rulers of Grenada, and the various dangers that he faces. He succeeds, and the couple become the new rulers of the kingdom.

As one of the best-known plays of the Restoration period, it is lauded for its elaborate themes, satirical language, sharp wit, and exploration of various human relations within the context of the societal norms and practices of the time. It is also notable for its use of poetic language, romantic settings, and complex characters, and is a significant work in Restoration drama, despite being Congreve's first and only attempt at a tragedy play. It continues to be studied and performed in theatres as a classic of the genre, although it is best remembered for its quotes.

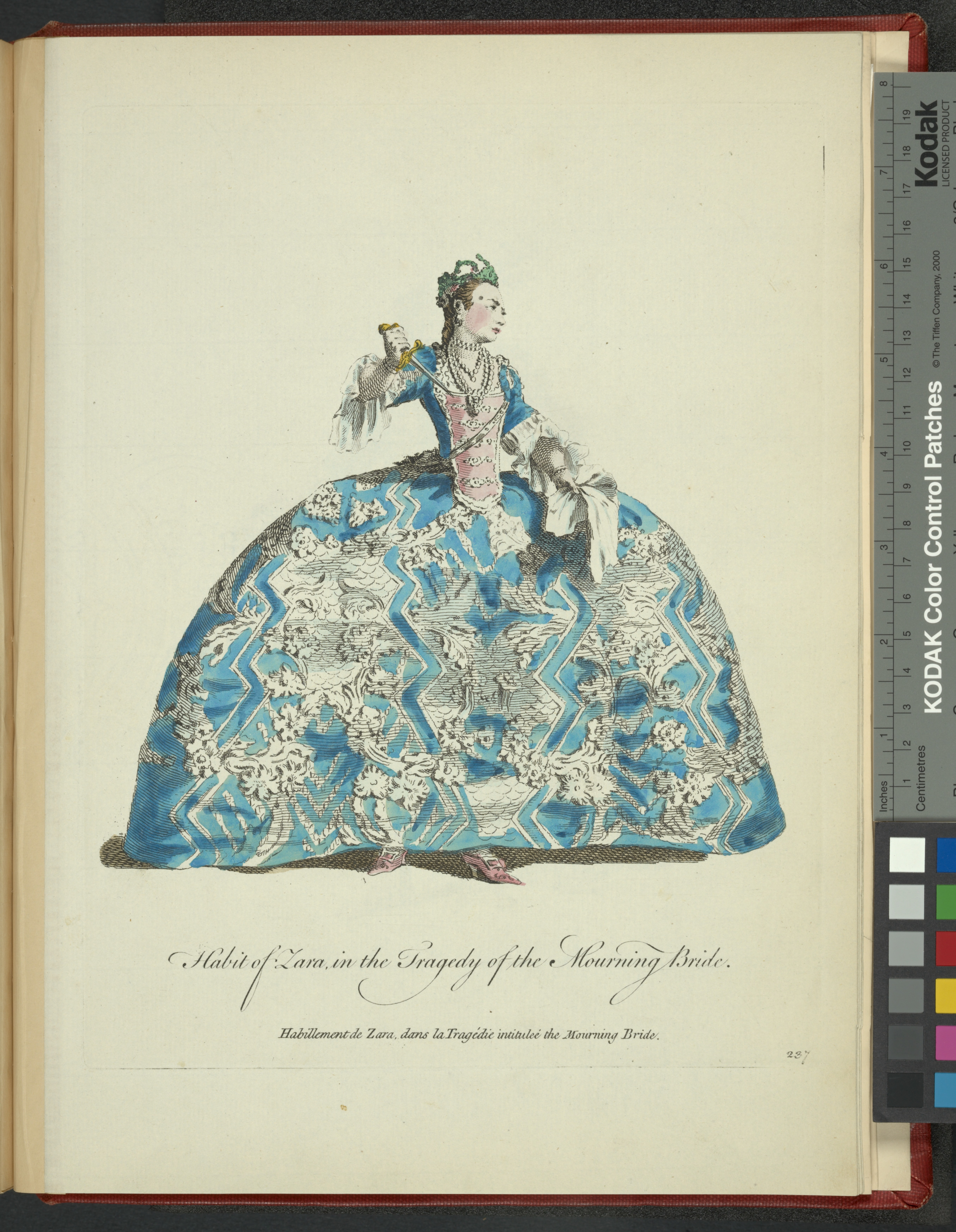
1757 costume drawing for Queen Zara in The Mourning Bride.

== Quotations ==
There are two very widely known quotations in the play; from the opening to the play:

Musick has Charms to soothe a savage Breast,
To soften Rocks, or bend a knotted Oak.

The word "breast" is often misquoted as "beast" and "has" sometimes appears as "hath". The lines are probably inspired by Pharsalia, written by Lucan.

Also often repeated is a quotation of Zara in Act III, Scene II:

Heav'n has no rage, like love to hatred turn'd,
Nor hell a fury, like a woman scorn'd.

This is usually paraphrased as "Hell hath no fury like a woman scorned."
