= The Way of the World =

1700 play by William Congreve

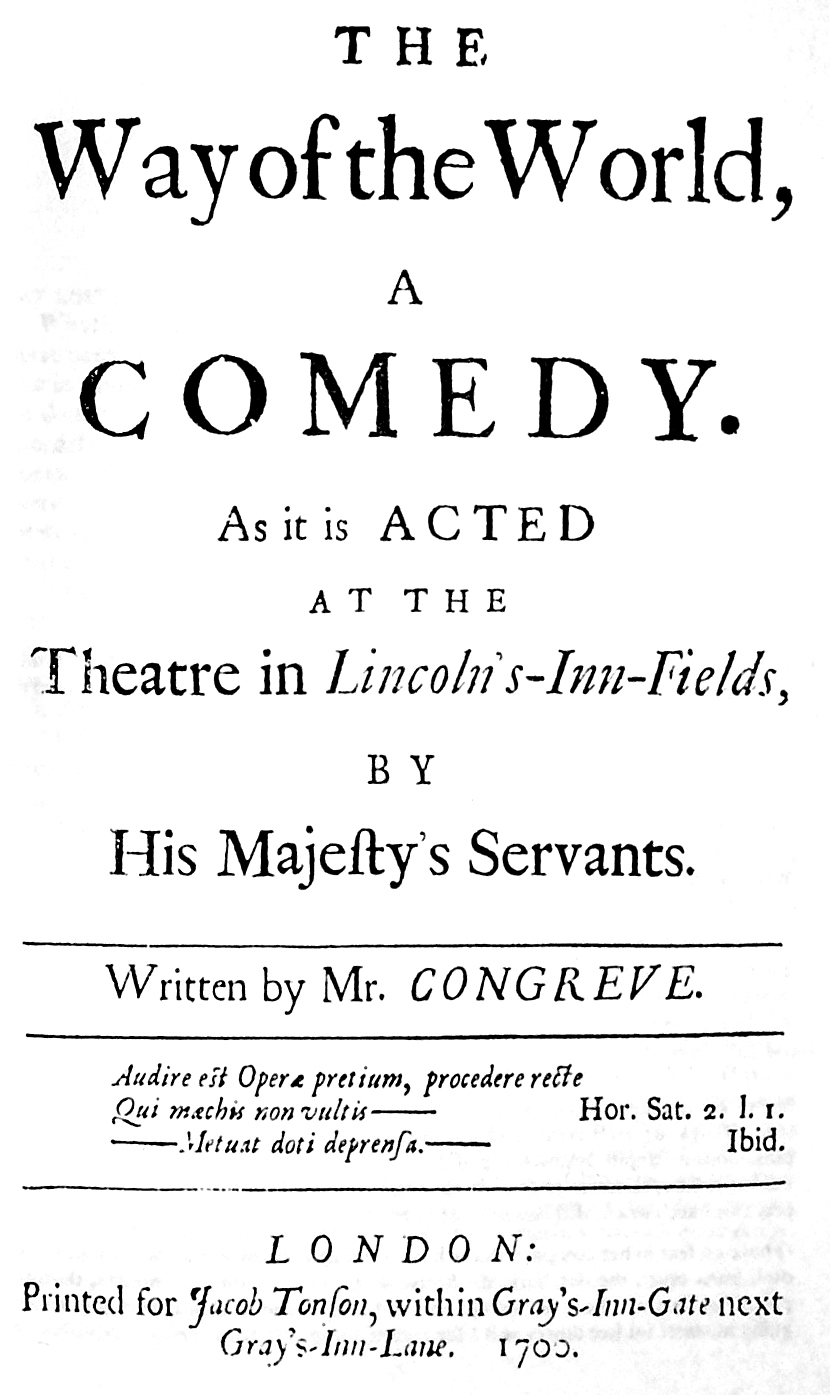
- Facsimile of the original title page for The Way of the World published (1700)
- Original language: English
- Written by: William Congreve
- Subject: Immorality
- Genre: Restoration comedy, comedy of manners
- Setting: London

Premiere
- Date: 1700
- Place: Lincoln's Inn Fields

The Way of the World is a comedy play written by the English playwright William Congreve, first performed in 1700. It premiered in the theatre in Lincoln's Inn Fields in London. It is widely regarded by critics as one of the finest works of Restoration comedy ever written, and has often been called a centrepiece of the genre. Initially, however, the play struck many audience members as continuing the "immorality" of the previous decades, and was not well received. Public perception of the play gradually changed over time, and it eventually became noted for its important role in shaping the comedy of manners genre during the Restoration period, and continues to be adapted for performances in operas, concerts, and theatres. The Restoration period was a time of "fashionable facade." Englishmen condemned sexual promiscuity in public, but in private took a liking to the well-executed French wit, and such is reflected in the subject matter of the play. This may have contributed to the play not being well received when it initially came out.

The play revolves around the intricate romantic relationships, courtships and social maneuvering of London's upper class, particularly in reference to the love story of Mirabell and Millamant. The work also explores themes of love, marriage, deception, morality, and the superficiality of high society, with a focus on the characters' pursuit of wealth, status and reputation. The play satirises the institution of marriage, showing it as a business deal and a social contract instead of being an emotional bonding. Throughout the play, the various characters engage in different forms of deception, deceit and manipulation to achieve their personal goals. The character of Marwood, a friend of both Fainall and Lady Wishfort, is a key figure in revealing personal secrets and creating conflict between the other characters, which sets the tone for the play.

As The Way of the World was written during the Restoration period of Great Britain, a time when the English society was undergoing significant changes socially and culturally, the play reflects many of these changes, and has been recognised for its witty dialogues, the exploration of social conventions, and its intricate plot. Its enduring importance lies mainly in its insightful portrayal of upper-class society and its lasting impact on dramatic literature, and is now considered by many commentators as a classic of Restoration comedy.

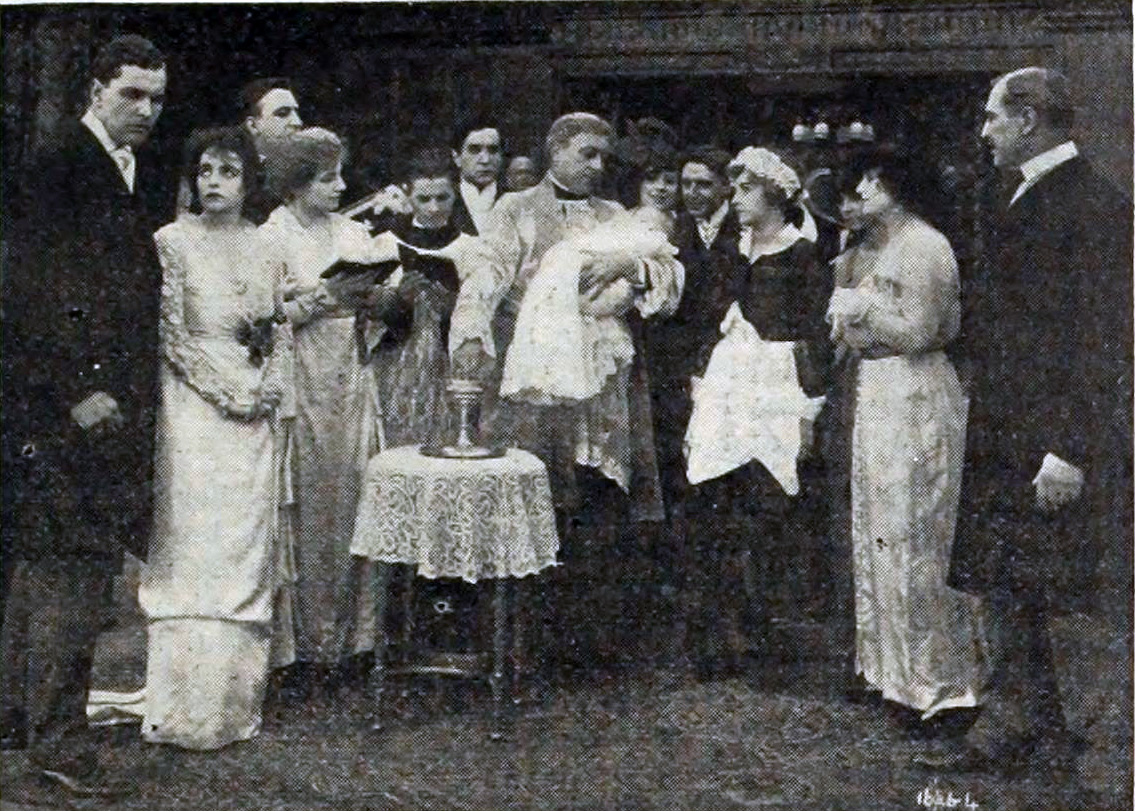
Illustration in the journal The Moving Picture World for the film adaptation of the play The Way of the World (1916).

== Characters ==
The play is based on the two lovers Mirabell and Millamant (originally played by John Verbruggen and Anne Bracegirdle). Mirabell is aware of the fact that in order for them to marry and receive Millamant's full dowry, Mirabell must receive the blessing of Millamant's aunt, Lady Wishfort. Unfortunately, Lady Wishfort is a very bitter lady who despises Mirabell and wants her own nephew, Sir Wilfull, to wed Millamant. Meanwhile, Lady Wishfort, a widow, wants to marry again and has her eyes on an uncle of Mirabell's, the wealthy Sir Rowland.

Another character, Fainall, is having a secret affair with Mrs. Marwood, a friend of Lady Wishfort. Mrs. Fainall, is also a widow, and before the events of the play was left a great fortune in the absence of her husband. She has a secret affair with Edward Mirabell, but ends it before getting engaged to Fainall. She is Lady Wishfort's daughter and once had an affair with Mirabell and remains his friend. In the meantime, Mirabell's servant Waitwell is married to Foible, Lady Wishfort's servant. Waitwell pretends to be Sir Rowland and, on Mirabell's command, tries to trick Lady Wishfort into a false engagement.

== Plot ==
Act 1 sets in a chocolate house where Mirabell and Fainall have just finished playing cards. A footman comes and tells Mirabell that Waitwell (Mirabell's male servant) and Foible (Lady Wishfort's female servant) were married that morning. Mirabell tells Fainall about his love of Millamant and is encouraged to marry her. Witwoud and Petulant appear and Mirabell is informed that should Lady Wishfort marry, he will lose £6000 of Millamant's inheritance. He will only get this money if he can get Lady Wishfort's consent to his and Millamant's marriage.

Act 2 is set in St. James’s Park. Mrs. Fainall and Mrs. Marwood are discussing their hatred of men. Fainall appears and accuses Mrs. Marwood (with whom he is having an affair) of loving Mirabell (which she does). Meanwhile, Mrs. Fainall (Mirabell's former lover) tells Mirabell that she hates her husband, and they begin to plot to deceive Lady Wishfort into giving her consent to the marriage. Millamant appears in the park and, angry about the previous night (when Mirabell was confronted by Lady Wishfort), she tells Mirabell of her displeasure in his plan, which she only has a vague idea about. After she leaves, the newly wed servants appear and Mirabell reminds them of their roles in the plan.

Acts 3, 4 and 5 are all set in the home of Lady Wishfort. We are introduced to Lady Wishfort who is encouraged by Foible to marry the supposed Sir Rowland – Mirabell's supposed uncle – so that Mirabell will lose his inheritance. Sir Rowland is, however, Waitwell in disguise, and the plan is to entangle Lady Wishfort in a marriage which cannot go ahead, because it would be bigamy, not to mention a social disgrace (Waitwell is only a serving man, Lady Wishfort an aristocrat). Mirabell will offer to help her out of the embarrassing situation if she consents to his marriage. Later, Mrs. Fainall discusses this plan with Foible, but this is overheard by Mrs. Marwood. She later tells the plan to Fainall, who decides that he will take his wife's money and go away with Mrs. Marwood.

Mirabell and Millamant, equally strong-willed, discuss in detail the conditions under which they would accept each other in marriage (otherwise known as the "proviso scene"), showing the depth of their feeling for each other. Mirabell finally proposes to Millamant and, with Mrs. Fainall's encouragement (almost consent, as Millamant knows of their previous relations), Millamant accepts. Mirabell leaves as Lady Wishfort arrives, and she lets it be known that she wants Millamant to marry her nephew, Sir Wilfull Witwoud, who has just arrived from the countryside. Lady Wishfort later gets a letter telling her about the Sir Rowland plot. Sir Rowland takes the letter and accuses Mirabell of trying to sabotage their wedding. Lady Wishfort agrees to let Sir Rowland bring a marriage contract that night.

By Act 5, Lady Wishfort has found out the plot, and Fainall has had Waitwell arrested. Mrs. Fainall tells Foible that her previous affair with Mirabell is now public knowledge. Lady Wishfort appears with Mrs. Marwood, whom she thanks for unveiling the plot. Fainall then appears and uses the information of Mrs. Fainall's previous affair with Mirabell and Millamant's contract to marry him to blackmail Lady Wishfort, telling her that she should never marry and that she is to transfer her fortune to him. Lady Wishfort offers Mirabell her consent to the marriage if he can save her fortune and honour. Mirabell calls on Waitwell who brings a contract from the time before the marriage of the Fainalls in which Mrs. Fainall gives all her property, in trust, to Mirabell. This neutralises the blackmail attempts, after which Mirabell restores Mrs. Fainall's property to her possession and then is free to marry Millamant with the full £12000 inheritance.

Although the play was not well received at first, it is now widely regarded as one of the foremost works of Restoration comedy ever written, and a centrepiece of the genre.

The play has strong themes about jealousy, deceit, and intrigue. This is what creates most of the conflict between each character. Most of the conflict is a game between the characters to deceive Lady Wishfort to gain control of her fortune. This play was also a milestone in feminist play productions. Many of the characters in this play are intelligent, and independent women, even though the play is still very sexually driven at times. There is also a big theme of money vs. love. It can be hard at times to read the motivation of each character, when considering their motives. Do they love the other person? Or are their actions motivated by greed? Hundreds of years later and this is still a relevant theme today.

== Epigraph of the 1700 edition ==
The epigraph found on the title page of the 1700 edition of The Way of the World contains two Latin quotations from Horace's Satires:

Audire est operæ pretium, procedere recte

Qui mæchis non vultis.—Hor. Sat. i. 2, 37.

—Metuat doti deprensa—Ibid.
