= William Congreve =

English playwright and poet (1670-1729)

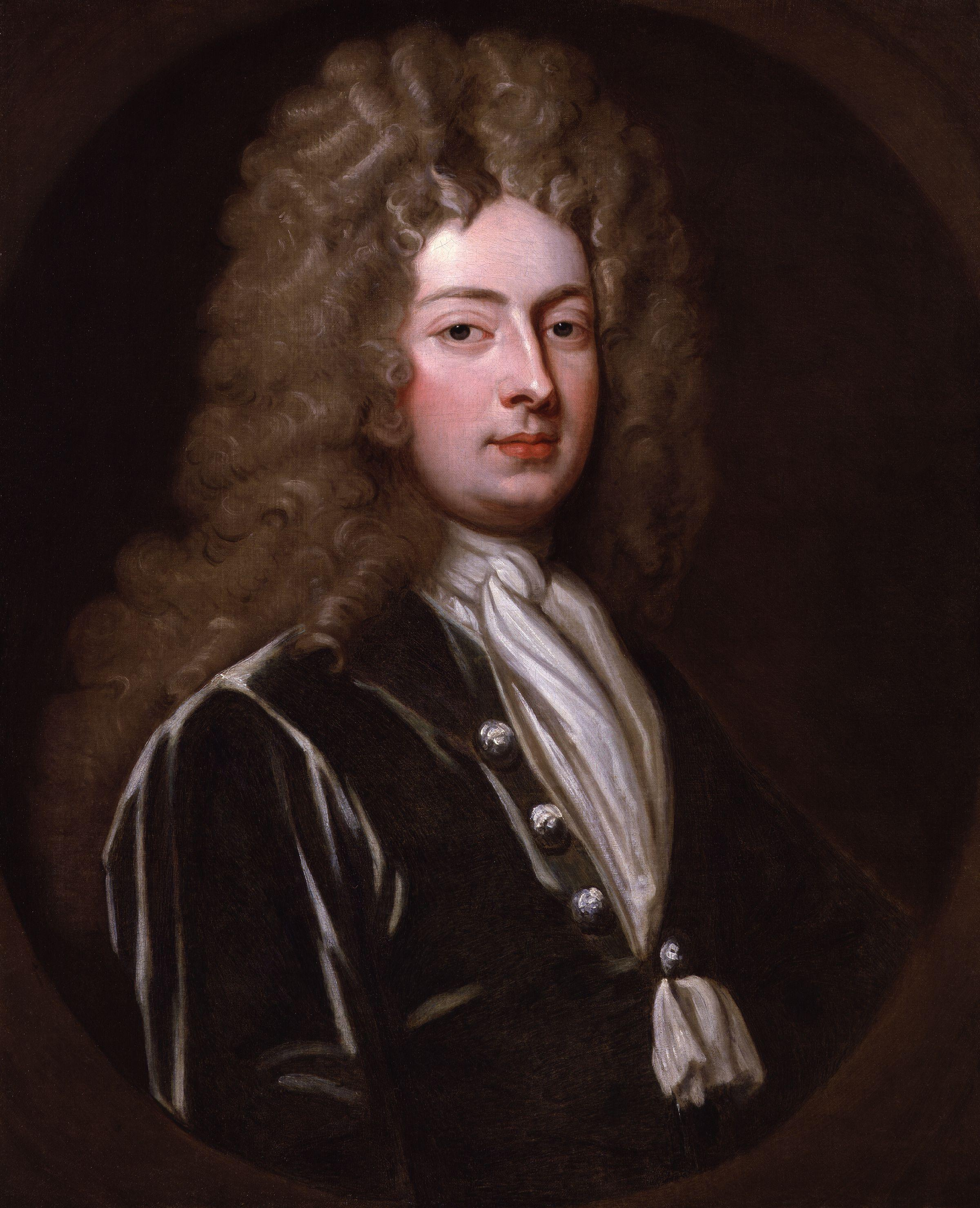
- Portrait by Sir Godfrey Kneller, c. 1709
- Born: 24 January 1670; Bardsey, West Riding of Yorkshire, England
- Died: 19 January 1729 (aged 58); London, England
- Resting place: Poets' Corner, Westminster Abbey, London
- Education: Trinity College Dublin (MA)
- Occupations: Playwright; satirist; poet
- Partner: Henrietta Godolphin
- Children: Mary Godolphin (illegitimate, 1723–1764)
- Relatives: Lady Elizabeth Hastings (distant relative); Cecil Ralph Townshend Congreve (descendant); Sir William Congreve, 2nd Baronet (descendant)
- Writing career
- Pen name: Cleophil
- Language: English
- Years active: 1693–1700
- Period: Restoration, Georgian era
- Genres: Satire, parody, comedy of manners
- Notable works: The Old Bachelor (1693); The Double Dealer (1693); Love for Love (1695); The Mourning Bride (1697); The Way of the World (1700)
- Movements: Classicism, Restoration comedy, Restoration literature

William Congreve (24 January 1670 – 19 January 1729) was an English playwright, satirist and poet. He played a major role in shaping English comedy, and is often regarded by literary critics as one of the greatest playwrights of the Restoration period. The popularity of his plays in the late 17th and early 18th centuries was central to the development of satirical comedy of manners, and he became recognised as a seminal figure of Restoration literature. Although he wrote several commercially successful works, Congreve is best remembered today for his quotes, such as, "O fie, miss, you must not kiss and tell", and "Hell hath no fury like a woman scorned".

He spent most of his early career between London and Dublin, during which time he was an apprentice to the English poet John Dryden and became noted for his highly polished style of writing. He initially wrote under the pseudonym Cleophil, and first achieved widespread fame beginning in 1693 when he produced some of the most popular English plays of the time. Congreve's best-known works include his plays The Way of the World (1700), which is regarded by commentators as a centerpiece of Restoration comedy literature, and The Mourning Bride (1697).

He wrote the majority of his works in London, and his plays and poems, which formed a major component of Restoration literature, were favorably viewed by the audience for their use of satire and comedy. During this time, Congreve also wrote several other notable works, such as The Old Bachelor (1693), The Double Dealer (1693), and Love for Love (1695), all of which helped establish him as one of the foremost writers in the comedy of manners genre. The majority of the stage plays of his time were dominated by female performers, and he formed a personal friendship with the English actress Anne Bracegirdle who played a leading role in many of his works. Despite this, his literary career only lasted seven years (from 1693 to 1700) and he wrote a total of five plays.

Congreve may have been forced off the stage due to growing concerns about the public perception of morality regarding his theatrical comedies. After leaving the theatrical stage, he remained active in political circles with the Whigs party during the early 18th century. Although he lived until 1729, he did not produce any plays after 1700, and when he died in London, he was honored with burial at the Poets' Corner in Westminster Abbey. Congreve remains a popular and polarising figure in English literature, and his works continue to be studied in literary circles.

== Early life ==
William Congreve was born in Bardsey Grange, in Bardsey, a village in the West Riding of Yorkshire. Although Samuel Johnson disputed this, it has since been confirmed by a baptism entry for "William, sonne of Mr. William Congreve, of Bardsey grange, baptised 10 February 1669" [i.e. 1670 by the modern reckoning of the new year]. His parents were Colonel William Congreve (1637–1708) and Mary Browning (1636?–1715), who moved to London in 1672, and then to the Irish port of Youghal.

Congreve was educated at Kilkenny College, where he met Jonathan Swift, and at Trinity College Dublin. He moved to London to study law at the Middle Temple, but preferred literature, drama, and the fashionable life. Congreve used the pseudonym Cleophil, under which he published Incognita: or, Love and Duty reconcil'd in 1692. This early work, written when he was about 17 years of age, gained him recognition among men of letters and entry into the literary world. He became a disciple of John Dryden whom he met through gatherings of literary circles held at Will's Coffeehouse in the Covent Garden district of London. Dryden supported him throughout his life, often composing complimentary introductions for his publications.

Congreve was distantly related to Lady Elizabeth Hastings, whose family owned Ledston and was part of the London intelligentsia. He wrote a number of articles about her in the Tatler magazine.

== Literary career ==
William Congreve shaped the English comedy of manners through his use of satire and well-written dialogue. Congreve achieved fame in 1693 when he wrote some of the most popular English plays of the Restoration period. This period was distinguished by the fact that female roles were beginning to be played predominantly by women, which was evident in Congreve's work. One of Congreve's favourite actresses was Mrs. Anne Bracegirdle, who performed many of the female lead roles in his plays.

His first play The Old Bachelor, written to amuse himself while convalescing, was produced at the Theatre Royal, Drury Lane in 1693. It was recognized as a success, and ran for a two-week period when it opened. Congreve's mentor John Dryden gave the production rave reviews and proclaimed it to be a brilliant first piece. The second play to be produced was called The Double-Dealer which was not nearly as successful as the first production. By the age of 30, he had written four comedies, including Love for Love (premiered 30 April 1695) staged at the Lincoln's Inn Theatre, which was nearly as well-received as his first major success, and The Way of the World (premiered March 1700). This play was a failure at the time of production but is seen as one of his masterpieces today, and is still revived. He wrote one tragedy, The Mourning Bride (1697) which was extremely popular at the time of creation but is now one of his least regarded dramas. After the production of Love for Love, Congreve became one of the managers for the Lincoln's Inn Fields in 1695. During that time, he wrote public occasional verse. As a result of his success and literary merit, he was awarded one of the five positions of commissioner for licensing hackney coaches.

Congreve's career as a playwright was successful but brief. He only wrote five plays, authored from 1693 to 1700, in total. This was partly in response to changes in taste, as the public turned away from the sort of high-brow sexual comedy of manners in which he specialized. Congreve may have been forced off the stage due to growing concerns about the morality of his theatrical comedies. He reportedly was particularly stung by a critique written by Jeremy Collier (A Short View of the Immorality and Profaneness of the English Stage), to the point that he wrote a long reply, "Amendments of Mr. Collier's False and Imperfect Citations." Although no longer on the stage, Congreve continued his literary art. He wrote the librettos for two operas that were being created at the time, and he translated the works of Molière.

As a member of the Whig Kit-Kat Club, Congreve's career shifted to the political sector, and even a political appointment in Jamaica in 1714 by George I. Congreve continued to write, although his style changed greatly. During his time in Jamaica, he wrote poetry instead of full-length dramatic productions and translated the works of Homer, Juvenal, Ovid, and Horace.

== Later life ==
Congreve withdrew from the theatre and lived the rest of his life on residuals from his early work, the royalties received when his plays were produced, as well as his private income. His output from 1700 was restricted to the occasional poem and some translation (notably Molière's Monsieur de Pourceaugnac). He collaborated with Vanbrugh on a 1704 English version of the play called Squire Trelooby. Congreve never married; in his own era and through subsequent generations, he was famous for his friendships with prominent actresses and noblewomen for whom he wrote major parts in all his plays. These women included Anne Bracegirdle and Henrietta Godolphin, 2nd Duchess of Marlborough, daughter of the famous general, John Churchill, 1st Duke of Marlborough. Congreve and Henrietta most probably met some time before 1703 and the duchess subsequently had a daughter, Mary (1723–1764), who was believed to be his child. Upon his death, he left his entire fortune to the Duchess of Marlborough.

As early as 1710, Congreve suffered both from gout and from cataracts on his eyes. He was involved in a carriage accident in late September 1728 from which he never recovered (having probably received an internal injury); he died in London in January 1729, and was buried in Poets' Corner in Westminster Abbey.

== Famous lines ==
Two of Congreve's phrases from The Mourning Bride (1697) have become famous, although they are frequently misquoted or misattributed to William Shakespeare.

- "Musick has charms to soothe a savage breast", which is the first line of the play, spoken by Almeria in Act I, Scene I. This is often rendered as: "Music hath charms to soothe the savage breast" or even "savage beast". On 9 September 1956, the line was recited in front of the largest television audience at that time, some 60.7 million viewers, by Charles Laughton, prior to bidding the audience good night on Elvis Presley's first appearance on The Ed Sullivan Show, which Laughton was guest hosting.
- "Heav'n has no rage, like love to hatred turn'd, Nor hell a fury, like a woman scorned", spoken by Zara in Act III, Scene VIII, but paraphrased as "Hell hath no fury like a woman scorned".

Congreve coined another famous phrase in Love for Love (1695):

- "O fie, Miss, you must not kiss and tell."

== Works ==
- Incognita: or, love and duty reconcil'd (1692) (proza) (Digital version)
- The Old Bachelor (1693)
- The Double Dealer (1693)
- Love for Love (1695)
- The mourning muse of Alexis. A pastoral. Lamenting the death of our late gracious Queen of ever blessed memory (1695) (Digital version)
- The Mourning Bride (1697)
- The Way of the World (1700)
- The works of Mr. William Congreve in three volumes. Consisting of his plays and poems (1752)
  - Volume the first. Contains: The old bachelor; The double dealer; The way of the world. Comedies (Digital version)
  - Volume the second. Contains: Love for love, a comedy; The mourning bride, tragedy; The judgement of Paris, masque (Digital version)
  - Volume the third. Contains: Semele, opera; Poems on several occasions (Digital version)

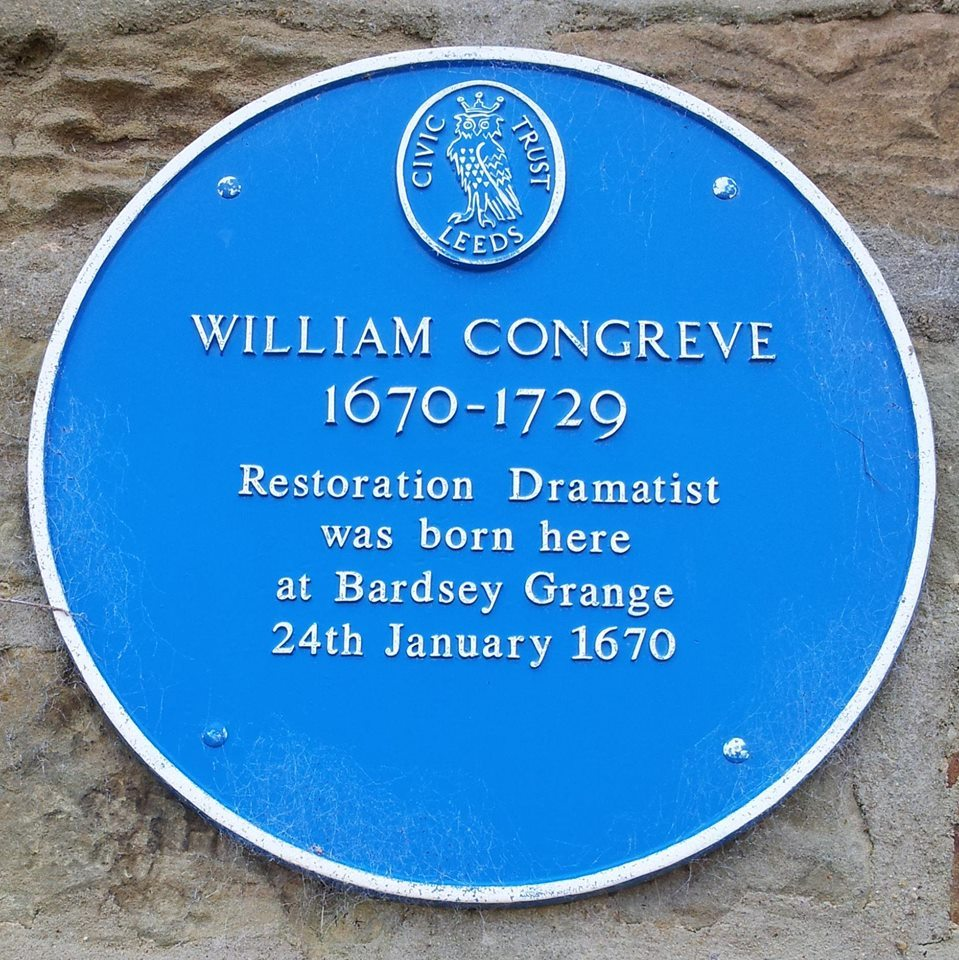
William Congreve blue plaque

== Legacy ==
Congreve became regarded by critics as one of the most influential dramatists of the Restoration era, and his five plays remained highly popular during the late 17th and 18th centuries, resulting in him being credited with developing the comedy of manners satirical genre. The Leeds Civic Trust, a registered charity in the United Kingdom, unveiled a blue plaque to Congreve in 2000.

== See also ==
- Restoration comedy

== Sources ==
- James Thomson. A poem to the memory of William Congreve. 1843 (Digital version)
- Edmund William Gosse. Life of William Congreve. London, 1888 (Digitale versie)
- Bonamy Dobrée, ‘Congreve’, in Restoration Comedy 1660-1720, Oxford University Press, 1924, blz. 121-150
- John C. Hodges. William Congreve, the man. A biography from new sources. New York, 1941 (Digitale versie)
- William Congreve, William Congreve (redactie Alex. Charles Ewald), Ernest Benn Ltd., London, 1948.
- Norman Norwood Holland. The first modern comedies : the significance of Etherege, Wycherley, and Congreve. Cambridge. 1959
- Aubrey L. Williams. An approach to Congreve. New Haven, 1979 ISBN 0-300-02304-9
- Julie Stone Peters. Congreve, the drama, and the printed word. Stanford, 1990 ISBN 0-8047-1751-6
- Congreve, William. The poetical works of William Congreve. With the life of the author. Cooke's edition. Embellished with superb engravings. London, [1796]. Eighteenth Century Collections Online. Gale. California State Univ, Northridge. 3 November 2015
- Klekar, Cynthia. "Obligation, Coercion, and Economy: The Gift of Deed in Congreve’s The Way of the World." In The Culture of the Gift in Eighteenth-Century England, ed. Linda Zionkowski and Cynthia Klekar. New York: Palgrave MacMillan, 2009.
- "Love for Love." Drama for Students. Ed. Jennifer Smith. Vol. 14. Detroit: Gale, 2002. 175–205. Gale Virtual Reference Library. Web. 3 November 2015.
- Macaulay, Thomas Babington. The Comic Dramatists of the Restoration. London, Longman, Brown, Green, and Longmans, 1853.
- The Editors of Encyclopædia Britannica. "William Congreve." Encyclopædia Britannica Online. Encyclopædia Britannica, n.d. Web. 7 April 2016.
- Dobrée, Bonamy. William Congreve. London: Published for the British Council and the National Book League by Longmans, Green, 1963. Print.
- Scott, Beatrice (1983). "Lady Elizabeth Hastings". The Yorkshire Archaeological Journal. 55.
- Thomas, David. "Life and Work." William Congreve. Ed. Bruce King. New York: St. Martin's, 1992. 1–14. Print.
