= John Verbruggen =

17th-century English actor

John Baptista Verbruggen, d. 1708, was an English actor working in London. Verbruggen is first mentioned as a member of the United Company in a Lord Chamberlain's warrant in 1688. His name does not appear in any cast lists until October 1690. The Biographical Dictionary of Actors contains an inconclusive discussion of the statement in Thomas Davies's Dramatic Miscellanies (1784) that Verbruggen was identical to the actor referred to in 1680s and 90s cast lists as "Mr. Alexander", supposedly an alias based on the part of Alexander the Great in John Dryden's Rival Queens. The evidence is confusing, and there is no independent support for Davies's anecdote, written down a century later. Verbruggen had never played the part of Alexander the Great and was not to do so until January 1703.

One reason for Verbruggen to use a different name might have been that his own was often misspelled: Verbrugen, Verbrogell, Verkruggan, Verbrugger. As "John Verbuggin", he is recorded as marrying the well-known actress Susanna Mountfort, widow of the actor William Mountfort, on 31 January 1694. Adding another possibility for confusion, William Mountfort was famous for his Alexander the Great.

When many of the senior actors at the United Company, headed by Thomas Betterton, seceded from the monopoly company and formed an actors' cooperative in March 1695, John and Susanna Verbruggen remained with Christopher Rich at the Drury Lane Theatre, where they were important assets to the depleted company. Rich raised Verbruggen's salary from £2 to £4 weekly to sign a new contract to "with his best care and skill Sing Dance Act Rehearse and Represent", an arrangement which put him on a level with George Powell, the leading actor in the remaining Drury Lane troupe. After a quarrel about shares and benefits which led to a physical fight in September 1696, Verbruggen was discharged from acting, but ordered by the Lord Chamberlain to stay with the Drury Lane company until 1 January 1697, to give Rich time to find a replacement. This order made possible the endangered November première of John Vanbrugh's The Relapse, where Verbruggen played the part of Loveless.

Moving to Betterton's company in January 1697, Verbruggen began to receive some critical comment, chiefly positive. He was considered a natural actor, with "a negligent agreeable Wildness in his Action and his Mein, which became him well". He chiefly played "fine gentlemen", wits, and rakes, and was William Congreve's original Mirabell in The Way of the World (1700). Anthony Aston contrasted his wild, untaught talents with Betterton's artfulness, and he was especially appreciated in "natural" characters such as the unique title character in a stage adaptation of Aphra Behn's Oroonoko written by Thomas Southerne.

John and Susanna Verbruggen had a child as early as 1703, Lewis, who was baptized on 27 May. Susanna Verbruggen died between July and August 1703, and the infant was buried in October. John Baptista Verbruggen was buried on 12 March 1708, and on 26 April at Drury Lane, a benefit was held for "a Young Orphan-Child of the late Mr Verbruggen and Mrs Verbruggen", presumably the John George Verbruggen, son of John and Susanna, who was baptized on 23 November 1708.

== Selected appearances ==
Tamerlane by Nicholas Rowe (1701)
