= William Mountfort =

English actor and playwright (c. 1664-1692)

William Mountfort (c. 1664 – 10 December 1692), the son of a Staffordshire gentleman, was an English actor and dramatic writer. He met his death at the hand of notorious brawler Charles Mohun, 4th Baron Mohun of Okehampton, who had just taken part in an attempted kidnap of Mountfort's friend, the actress Anne Bracegirdle.

== Biography ==
By 1678 Mountfort had travelled to London, where his first stage appearance was with the Dorset Garden Theatre company, taking the part of a boy in The Counterfeits. By 1682 he was taking important roles, usually those of the fine gentleman, and he came to be considered a major talent. Mountfort wrote a number of plays, wholly or in part, and many prologues and epilogues. In 1686 he married the actress Susanna Percival.

Owing to jealousy of Anne Bracegirdle's supposed interest in Mountfort, Captain Richard Hill, an adventurer, who had annoyed her with persistent attentions, accompanied by Charles Mohun, ambushed Mountfort in Howard Street, Strand, on 9 December 1692. During the struggle Mountfort was stabbed in the chest by Hill, and he died of his wounds the following day. Following the attack Hill fled to Scotland. Lord Mohun was tried by his peers in the House of Lords. Evidence was given as to the peer's good character and, controversially, he was acquitted.

The bell of St Clement's Church is reputed to have cracked when tolled at Mountfort's funeral. His daughter Susanna Mountfort became an actor at Drury Lane. A novel The player's tragedy. Or, Fatal love, a fictionalized version of the event, appeared in 1693.

== Works ==
An anthology of his plays, entitled Six Plays, was published by J. Tonson, G. Strahan and William Mears in two volumes (1719–20) accompanied by a preface consisting of some memoirs of his life. The plays were:

- The Injured Lovers (1688)
- The Successful Strangers (1690)
- Greenwich Park (1691)
- King Edward the Third; with the Fall of Mortimer Earl of March (generally attributed to John Bancroft)
- The life and death of Dr. Faustus
- Henry the Second, King of England, with the Death of Rosamond (1692) (also attributed to John Bancroft)

It is believed that his 1705 play Zelmane: Or, The Corinthian Queen: A Tragedy. As it is Acted at the New-theatre in Lincolns-Inn-Fields has the first appearance of the expression, "Be still my beating heart."
