= George Powell (playwright) =

English actor and playwright (died 1714)

George Powell (1668? – 1714) was a 17th-century London actor and playwright who was a member of the United Company. He was the son of the actor Martin Powell, a long-standing member of the King's Company.

== Plays ==
In his playwrighting, Powell has been called 'an unscrupulous and opportunistic appropriator, gleaning materials from a variety of sources'. He was embroiled in a plagiarism scandal after writing a misogynistic play called The Imposture Defeated; or, A Trick to Cheat the Devil, first performed in September 1697. This play portrayed the proper treatment of an adulteress as brutal confinement and isolation from others to punish her and prevent the spread of her attitude. It is widely accepted that Powell had plagiarised from the then unpublished manuscript of Mary Pix's The Deceiver Deceived. Theatre critic Charles Gildon called Powell's version the inferior of the two.

Powell also wrote the plays Alphonso, King of Naples (first performed in December 1690), A Very Good Wife (first performed in April 1693), Bonduca: or, The British Heroine (1695) and The Treacherous Brothers (first performed in January 1690) under his own name. Each of these plays premièred at London's Theatre Royal, Drury Lane. In collaboration with John Verbruggen, he wrote A new opera called Brutus of Alba: or, Augusta's Triumph, first performed in 1696 at Dorset Garden, London. All of the works he wrote or co-wrote were tragedies.

The United Company broke in two in 1694, with the walking out of senior actors including Thomas Betterton, Elizabeth Barry, and Anne Bracegirdle. It is unlikely that Powell was invited to join them: while he was skilled and experienced, he was also notorious for his bad temper and alcoholism (Milhous).

At the première of John Vanbrugh's The Relapse in November 1696, Powell was according to Vanbrugh so drunk that when playing the seducer Worthy he molested the heroine Amanda in a much more physical way than the script provided for.

Powell was married to actress Mary Powell.

== Selected roles ==
- Jack Rakish in Woman's Wit by Colley Cibber (1697)
- Tamerlane by Nicholas Rowe (1701)
