= Charles Gildon =

English writer

Charles Gildon (c. 1665 – 1 January 1724), was an English hack writer and translator. He produced biographies, essays, plays, poetry, fictional letters, fables, short stories, and criticism. He is remembered best as a target of Alexander Pope in Pope's Dunciad and his Epistle to Dr. Arbuthnot and as an enemy of Jonathan Swift. Due to Pope's caricature of Gildon as well as the volume and rapidity of his writings, Gildon has become the epitome of the hired pen and literary opportunist.

He is a literary source for many biographies of Restoration figures, although he appears to have propagated or introduced errors. Gildon's biographies are often the only biographies available, but they have often been shown to have invention in them.

== Early life ==
Gildon was born in Gillingham, Dorset to a Roman Catholic family that had been active in support of the Royalist side during the English Civil War. While one of Charles's cousins, Joseph, would become a Catholic priest, Charles's parents fled to France, and Charles was educated at Douai. He left college without ordination and moved to England in 1684, at the age of 19. Two years later, he moved to London, where he immediately spent or lost his patrimony. Two years after that, in 1688, he married a woman without money. He almost immediately turned to writing as a method of getting money.

== Career ==
His first known literary employer was John Dunton, who used Gildon for The Athenian Mercury and to write The History of the Athenian Society in 1692. In the same year, Gildon wrote a biography of Aphra Behn, claiming to have been her close friend. Inasmuch as he and Behn were both probably royalists from Dorset (although only Gildon's family had been active during the Interregnum, whereas Behn was probably a Cavalier spy), it is possible that Gildon did know and seek out Behn, but his account of her life has many errors (including a credulous reading of Oroonoko). At the time, he was a social correspondent with John Dryden and William Wycherley, as well as Behn. He was a Deist in the mid 1690s.

In 1693, Gildon edited and published The Oracles of Reason. This book is a collection of Deist writings supplied by Charles Blount. It comprises a "Preface" by Gildon, Blount's "Vindication of Dr. Burnet", an English translation by "H. B." of three sections of Thomas Burnet's Archaeologiae Philosophicae, Blount's "Summary Account of the Deists Religion", and several letters (tracts) prepared by Blount, Gildon, and other writers. In 1695, Gildon republished The Oracles of Reason in his collection of The Miscellaneous Works of Charles Blount. Writing as "Lindamour", Gildon prefaced this new collection with an invented letter "To the Honorable and Divine Hermione. Giving an account of the Life and Death of the Author.", also known as Gildon's hagiographic "Life of Blount".

In 1694, in response to Thomas Rymer's recently published criticisms of Shakespeare and other 'modern' plays and their authors, Goldin presented a defense of the modernism of John Dryden and John Dennis.

Between 1696 and 1702, Gildon wrote four blank verse tragedies that failed. He converted to Anglicanism in 1698 and wrote The Deist's Manual (1705) to attack Deism. He produced a series of tales, including "The Post-Boy Robb'd of his Mail", "The Golden Spy," and "All for the Better" between 1692 and 1720.

Gildon's The Golden Spy (1709) has been regarded by modern scholars as "the first, fully-fledged it-narrative in English". But for his contemporaries, it tends to be read as "a Menippean satire, a re-adaptation of Apuleius's The Golden Ass and a sequel to The New Metamorphosis [i.e. Gildon's adaptation of The Golden Ass in 1708]".

In 1706, Gildon, a staunch Whig by then (in contrast to his family's Toryism and Jacobitism), published letters to the Electress Sophia to come visit England, with an eye toward being on hand to take the throne upon Queen Anne's death. The government prosecuted him for seditious libel. Prominent Whigs came to his aid, and Richard Steele wrote his appeal. When Gildon was found guilty and fined 100 pounds, Arthur Mainwaring paid his fine. The letters were sufficient provocation to carry a prison term or the pillory, but Gildon's connections saved him.

Arthur Mainwaring, an enemy already of Jonathan Swift's, aided Gildon again, and Steele introduced him to other periodical work. Gildon's 1710 Life of Thomas Betterton was dedicated to Steele in return.

Gildon's essay on "The Art of Poetry" was published anonymously in John Brightland's A Grammar of the English Tongue, which was first published in 1711; Gildon later expanded this essay into his book The Complete Art of Poetry in 1718. Brightland's Grammar also included Gildon's treatise on "Logic; or, The Art of Reasoning". Gildon's "Logic" is an unattributed translation of a large part of Jean Le Clerc's Logica of 1692. Much of Gildon's translation of Le Clerc was appropriated by Ephraim Chambers when Chambers composed his Cyclopaedia.

In 1711, John Brightland hired Gildon to run The British Mercury. For six months, Gildon conducted attacks on Jonathan Swift and Alexander Pope. He attacked Swift for Swift's enmity with Mainwaring, and his quarrel with Pope was probably similarly political. After The British Mercury folded, he launched another attack on Pope in a play called A New Rehearsal (1714) and in the body of Memoirs of the Life of William Wycherley (one of Pope's mentors) in 1718. Gildon switched literary sides in Complete Art of Poetry, which he dedicated to the Duchess of Buckingham. In it, he reiterated Rymer's dicta of neo-classicism, which he had disapproved of earlier in his career, with Dryden.

Gildon is involved with the biographies of women writers. He is assumed to be the biographer who masqueraded as "One of the Fair Sex" of Memoirs on the Life of Mrs. Behn which appears at the beginning of the first edition of The Histories and Novels or the Late Ingenious Mrs. Behn (1696). Gildon wrote two sheets of Mrs. Manley's life under the title of The History of Rivella, Author of the Atalantis, probably in a negative light. Delarivier Manley persuaded the publisher Edmund Curll to defer the publication; soon Manley met and reconciled with Gildon to suppress his materials. Then Manley wrote her own version of history under strict time constraints and published it anonymously under the title The Adventures of Rivella (1714).

Gildon aspired to a courtly lifestyle; in 1703, Daniel Defoe attacked him as a rake who "keeps six Whores, and starves his modest Wife". Gildon apparently did not forget Defoe's insult. In 1719, Defoe published his tale of Robinson Crusoe's adventures. Defoe's title page reads "The Life and Strange Surprizing Adventures of Robinson Crusoe, of York, Mariner: who lived eight and twenty Years all alone in an un-inhabited Island on the Coast of America, near the Mouth of the Great River of Oroonoque; having been cast on Shore by Shipwreck, wherein all the Men perished but himself. With an Account how he was at last as strangely deliver'd by Pyrates." Before the year was out, Gildon responded with a mocking satire, whose title page in return is "The Life and Strange Surprizing Adventures of Mr. D---- De F--, of London, Hosier, who has liv'd above fifty Years by himself in the Kingdoms of North and South Britain. The various Shapes he has appear'd in, and the Discoveries he has made for the Benefit of his Country. In a Dialogue between Him, Robinson Crusoe, and His Man Friday. With Remarks Serious and Comical upon the Life of Crusoe." Gildon used a dialogue between Defoe and his characters Robinson Crusoe and Friday to expose narrative inconsistencies in Defoe's novel. On page xvii, Crusoe and Friday make Defoe swallow his own big books as a punishment for his unfair depiction of his characters, saying "if you will make such large Compositions, you must take them for your Pains." Without explicitly identifying Gildon, Defoe defended himself against his critics in his preface to Serious Reflections of Robinson Crusoe (1720), the final installment of Robinson Crusoe.

By 1719, Gildon was blind and impoverished. Pope suggested, in his correspondence, that the blindness was due to syphilis. Gildon was in danger of starvation. In 1721, the Duchess of Buckingham gave him some relief. The same year, Robert Harley (patron and friend to Swift and Pope, earlier) gave him a 100-pound annuity as a "Royal Bounty." On 12 December 1723, a benefit of Thomas Southerne's Oroonoko was probably intended for him. Gildon died in London on 1 January 1724.
