= United Company =

Theatre company

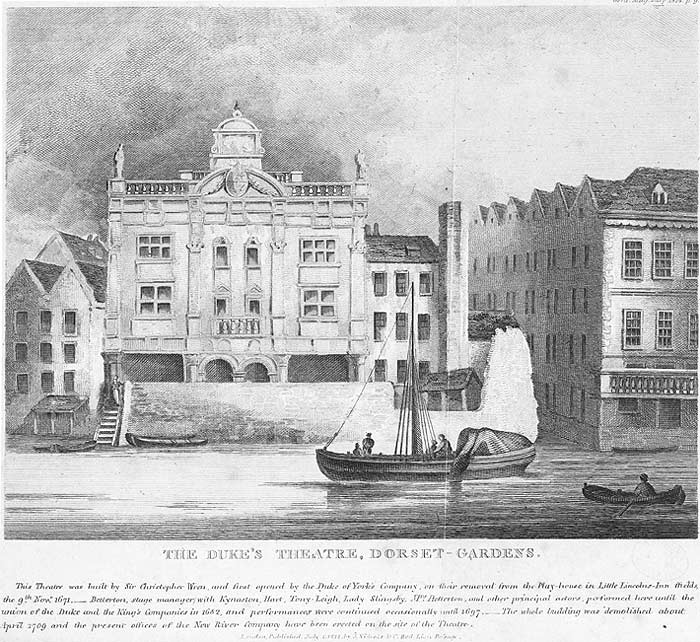
The Duke's Theatre at Dorset Gardens, on the river front, London's most luxurious playhouse

The United Company was a London theatre company formed in 1682 with the merger of the King's Company and the Duke's Company.

Both the Duke's and King's Companies suffered poor attendance during the turmoil of the Popish Plot period, 1678–81. When the King's Company fell into difficulties due to mismanagement, the Duke's Company joined with them to form the United Company in 1682, managed by the Duke's Company leaders. The United Company began performances in November 1682. The King's Company theatre, the Theatre Royal in Drury Lane, was used mainly for plays, while the Duke's Dorset Garden Theatre was devoted to operas and spectaculars.

The company began performing in November 1682 at Drury Lane. In February 1685 the theatre was closed by the death of Charles II, and reopened in January 1688 under the patronage of James II. The succession of William III and Mary II in 1689 brought no Royal patronage and a decline in interest in theatre.

The company formed a monopoly of theatre in London, and this left both actors and playwrights in a weak position in respect to the management. When two companies had competed, many new plays were performed each year, but with the monopoly the number dropped dramatically. Between 1675 and 1678, there were 68 new plays performed by the competing companies, during the first four seasons of the United Company, merely 19 were performed.

Christopher Rich took over the management in 1693, and his methods caused a split between the players in 1694. He was described "as sly a Tyrant as ever was at the Head of a Theatre," and the senior actors including Elizabeth Barry, Thomas Betterton and Anne Bracegirdle, with twelve other players left to form their own collaborative company. Barry was one of the original patent-holders of the actors' company, which opened at Lincoln's Inn Fields with the smash hit of Congreve's Love For Love in 1695 and continued to successfully challenge the much-reduced United Company.

Architect and dramatist John Vanbrugh raised a subscription, probably amongst members of the Kit-Kat Club, offering "to recover them" (that is Betterton's company), "therefore, to their due Estimation, a new Project was form'd of building them a stately Theatre in the Hay-Market, by Sir John Vanbrugh, for which he raised a Subscription of thirty Persons of Quality, at one hundred Pounds each, in Consideration whereof every Subscriber, for his own Life, was to be admitted to whatever Entertainments should be publickly perform'd there, without farther Payment for his Entrance." He was joined in the enterprise by his principal associate and manager William Congreve, and the actors' co-operative led by Thomas Betterton. The Queen's Theatre opened on 9 April 1705, with The Loves of Ergasto, an opera by Giacomo Greber. The first season was a failure, at which Congreve departed and Vanbrugh bought out his other partners.
