= 1702 in literature =

This article contains information about the literary events and publications of 1702.

== Events ==
- March 8 (O.S.) – Accession of Anne, Queen of Great Britain, upon the death of her brother-in-law William III.
- March 11 (O.S.) – The first regular English national newspaper, The Daily Courant, begins publication, in Fleet Street in the City of London. It covers only foreign news.
- October – Jonathan Swift returns to Ireland in the company of Esther Johnson.
- unknown dates
  - Ballet master John Weaver presents the burlesque Tavern Bilkers at the Theatre Royal, Drury Lane in London, the first English pantomime. It is not a success.
  - The first book set in the Romain du Roi Roman type, devised for use by the Imprimerie nationale in France: Médailles sur les principaux événements du règne de Louis le Grand, is printed.
  - Castle Howard in Yorkshire, England, is completed to the design of playwright John Vanbrugh and architect Nicholas Hawksmoor.

== New books ==
=== Prose ===
- Louise de Bossigny, comtesse d'Auneuil – La Tiranie des fées détruite (The Tyranny of the Fairies Destroyed)
- Thomas Brown, et al. – Letters From the Dead to the Living
- Edmund Calamy – An Abridgement of Mr Baxter's History of His Life and Times
- Daniel Defoe
  - An Enquiry into Occasional Conformity
  - The Mock-Mourners (on the death of William III)
  - A New Test of the Church of England's Loyalty
  - Reformation of Manners
  - The Shortest Way with the Dissenters (anonymous; December)
  - The Spanish Descent
- John Dennis – The Monument
- Laurence Echard – A General Ecclesiastical History
- George Farquhar – Love and Business
- Edmund Gibson – Synodus Anglicana (on the convocation)
- Charles Gildon (?) – A Comparison Between the Two Stages (on the "War of the Theatres")
- Examen Miscellaneum
- Edward Hyde, 1st Earl of Clarendon – The History of the Rebellion and Civil Wars in England (1702–1704, written in the 1640s and late 1660s. Also known as Clarendon's History)
- George Keith – The Standard of the Quakers Examined
- John Kersey – A New English Dictionary; or, a complete collection of the most proper and significant words, commonly used in the language
- Cotton Mather – Magnalia Christi Americana
- Matthew Prior – To a Young Gentleman in Love
- John Toland – Paradoxes of State
- Catherine Trotter Cockburn – A Defence of the Essay of Human Understanding (re John Locke)

=== Drama ===
- William Burnaby – The Modish Husband
- Susanna Centlivre –
  - The Beau's Duel
  - The Stolen Heiress
- Colley Cibber – She Would and She Would Not
- John Dennis – The Comical Gallant
- George Farquhar
  - The Inconstant
  - The Twin Rivals
- Charles Gildon – The Patriot
- Bevil Higgons – The Generous Conqueror (printed, performed in 1701)
- Francis Manning – All for the Better
- John Oldmixon – The Governour of Cyprus
- Nicholas Rowe
  - The Fair Penitent (adaptation of Massinger and Field's The Fair Penitent, performed, printed in 1703)
  - Tamerlane (printed, performed in 1701)
- Sir Charles Sedley – The Tyrant King of Crete
- John Vanbrugh – The False Friend

=== Poetry ===
- Matsuo Bashō (posthumously) – Oku no Hosomichi (Narrow Road to the Deep North)

== Births ==
- June 26 – Philip Doddridge, English religious and writer and hymnist (died 1751)
- Unknown date – Margareta Momma, Swedish journalist and publisher (died 1772)

== Deaths ==
- January 1 – Samuel Green, American printer (born c. 1614)
- January 17 – Roger Morrice, English journalist and diarist (born 1628)
- February 17 – Peder Syv, Danish philologist, folklorist and priest (born 1631)
- April 22 – François Charpentier, French archeologist and writer (born 1620)
- May 17 (bur.) – Richard Sault, English mathematician, editor and translator (unknown year of birth)
- May 27 – Dominique Bouhours, French literary critic (born 1628)
- November – John Pomfret, English poet (born 1667)
