= 1706 in literature =

This article contains information about the literary events and publications of 1706.

== Events ==
- April 8 – George Farquhar's Restoration comedy The Recruiting Officer is performed for the first time, at the Theatre Royal, Drury Lane, in London.
- April/May – Philosopher Samuel Clarke attacks the views of Henry Dodwell on the immortality of the soul.
- September 13 – Daniel Defoe leaves England for Edinburgh, Scotland, where he acts as a government agent to promote ratification of the Treaty of Union.
- unknown date – The first translation of the New Testament into the Upper Sorbian language, made by pastor Michał Frencel who dies this year, is published by his son Abraham in Zittau.

== New books ==
=== Prose ===
- Anonymous – The Arabian Nights' Entertainments (serial, the first English translation of One Thousand and One Nights, taken from the first French translation)
- Samuel Clarke – A Discourse Concerning the Unchangeable Obligations of Natural Religion
- Stephen Clay – An Epistle from the Elector of Bavaria to the French King
- Daniel Defoe
  - An Essay at Removing National Prejudices Against a Union with Scotland
  - A True Relation of the Apparition of one Mrs. Veal (attrib)
- John Dennis – Essay on the Operas after the Italian Manner
- White Kennett – The History of England from the Commencement of the Reign of Charles I to the End of William III
- John Locke – Posthumous Works of Mr John Locke
- Simon Ockley – Introductio ad linguas orientates
- Jonathan Swift – Baucis and Philemon
- Matthew Tindal – The Rights of the Christian Church Asserted
- Ned Ward – The London Spy

=== Drama ===
- Thomas Betterton – The Amorous Widow
- Susanna Centlivre –
  - Love at a Venture
  - The Platonick Lady
- Colley Cibber – Perolla and Izadora
- Catherine Trotter Cockburn – The Revolution of Sweden
- Antoine Danchet – Cyrus
- Thomas D'Urfey – Wonders in the Sun (opera)
- George Farquhar – The Recruiting Officer
- George Granville – The British Enchanters, or No Magic Like Love
- Delarivière Manley – Almyna, or The Arabian Vow
- Mary Pix (attr.) – Adventures in Madrid
- Jean-François Regnard – Le Légataire universel (The Residuary Legatee)
- John Vanbrugh – The Mistake
- José de Cañizares – El pastelero de Madrigal

=== Poetry ===
- Richard Blackmore – An Advice to the Poets: a poem occasioned by the wonderful success of Her Majesty's arms, under the conduct of the Duke of Marlborough in Flanders
- William Congreve – A Pindarique Ode.... The Conduct of the Duke of Marlborough
- Daniel Defoe
  - Caledonia
  - A Hymn to Peace
  - Jure Divino (on divine right)
  - The Vision (on national union)
- John Dennis – The Battle of Ramillia
- Mihai Iștvanovici – Stihuri politice (Political Verse)
- John Philips – Cerealia: An imitation of Milton
- Matthew Prior – The Squirrel
- Thomas Tickell – Oxford
- Isaac Watts – Horae Lyricae

== Births ==
- January 17 – Benjamin Franklin, American polymath and politician (died 1790)
- February 10 – Benjamin Hoadly, English physician and dramatist (died 1757)
- November 8 – Johann Ulrich von Cramer, German philosopher and jurist (died 1772)
- December 17 – Émilie du Châtelet, French writer and translator (died 1749)

== Deaths ==
- January 21 – Adrien Baillet, French critic (born 1649)
- February 27 – John Evelyn, English diarist (born 1620)
- August 6 – Jean-Baptiste du Hamel, French natural philosopher (born 1624)
- December 8 – Abraham Nicolas Amelot de la Houssaye, French historian (born 1634)
- December 28 – Pierre Bayle, French encyclopedist and philosopher (born 1647)
- unknown dates
  - John Phillips, English satirist (born 1631)
  - Rahman Baba, Indian Pashto poet (born 1632)
  - Guillaume Vandive, French printer and bookseller (born 1680)
