= John Corey (actor) =

British actor

John Corey (fl. 1701–1735) was an English stage actor and playwright of the eighteenth century. His name is sometime written as John Cory.

Born in Barnstaple in North Devon of a Cornish family, he first acted on the London stage in 1701 have originally studied law at the Inns of Chancery. He was therefore unlikely to have been the son of the Restoration actress Katherine Corey.

Between 1701 and 1735 he was a mainstay of the Drury Lane, Haymarket and Lincoln's Inn Fields Theatre companies. Late in his career he appeared at the Goodman's Fields Theatre run by Henry Giffard. He also wrote two plays which were performed at Lincoln's Inn Fields early in his career there.

== Selected roles ==
- Seleuchus in Antiochus the Great by Jane Wiseman (1701)
- Mirvan in Tamerlane by Nicholas Rowe (1701)
- Colonel Many in The Beau's Duel by Susanna Centlivre (1702)
- Careles in The Different Widows by Mary Pix (1703)
- Dorante in The Gamester by Susanna Centlivre (1705)
- Erici in The Revolution of Sweden by Catherine Cockburn (1706)
- Don Philip in Adventures in Madrid by Mary Pix (1706)
- Barzanes in The Persian Princess by Lewis Theobald (1708)
- Easy in The Fair Quaker of Deal by Charles Shadwell (1710)
- Gonsalvo in The Perfidious Brother by Lewis Theobald (1716)
- Lelius in Scipio Africanus by Charles Beckingham (1718)
- Menenius in The Invader of His Country by John Dennis (1719)
- Agesilius in The Spartan Dame by Thomas Southerne (1719)
- Salisbury in Sir Walter Raleigh by George Sewell (1719)
- Amiens in Love in a Forest by Charles Johnson (1730)
- Orthagoros in Timoleon by Benjamin Martyn (1730)
- Therapios in Medea by Charles Johnson (1730)
- Ariston in Eurydice by David Mallet (1731)

== Bibliography ==
- Highfill, Philip H, Burnim, Kalman A. & Langhans, Edward A. A Biographical Dictionary of Actors, Actresses, Musicians, Dancers, Managers, and Other Stage Personnel in London, 1660–1800: Volume VIII. SIU Press, 1978.
