= George Pack (actor) =

British actor

George Pack (fl. 1700–1724) was a British stage actor, singer and theatre manager of the eighteenth century. His first known performance on the London stage was as Westmoreland in Shakespeare's Henry IV at the Lincoln's Inn Fields Theatre and he remained with the company until it transferred to the Queens's Theatre in the Haymarket in 1705. He played in a mixture of comedies and tragedies, originating roles in plays by many of the leading dramatists of the era including Nicholas Rowe, Mary Pix, John Vanbrugh and Susanna Centlivre.

In 1708 Pack joined the Drury Lane company and remained with it until he left to join John Rich's new company at the revived Lincoln's Inn Fields Theare in 1715. His final original role was in The Chimera in 1721. The following year he announced his retirement but came back briefly to appear in a benefit performance for Frances Maria Knight in 1724 and also received his own benefit shortly afterwards. After leaving the stage he took over an inn located on the corner of Haymarket and Pall Mall which he renamed The Busie Body after the play in which he played his best known role of Marplot. His year of death is unknown but occurred some time before 1749.

== Selected roles ==
- Cleanthes in The Ambitious Stepmother by Nicholas Rowe (1700)
- Rureck in The Czar of Muscovy by Mary Pix (1701)
- Philotas in Antiochus the Great by Jane Wiseman (1701)
- Ned in The Ladies Visiting Day by William Burnaby (1701)
- Tilladen in Altemira by Charles Boyle (1701)
- Morganius in Love's Victim by Charles Gildon (1701)
- Stratocles in Tamerlane by Nicholas Rowe (1702)
- Ogle in The Beau's Duel by Susanna Centlivre (1702)
- Francisco in The Stolen Heiress by Susanna Centlivre (1702)
- Sir Anthony Loveman in The Different Widows by Mary Pix (1703)
- Jack Single in As You Find It by Charles Boyle (1703)
- Pedro in Love Betrayed by William Burnaby (1703)
- Fetch in The Stage Coach by George Farquhar (1704)
- Pinch in The Biter by Nicholas Rowe (1704)
- Sir Nicholas Empty in Love at First Sight by David Crauford (1704)
- Hector in The Gamester by Susanna Centlivre (1705)
- Brass in The Confederacy by John Vanbrugh (1705)
- Robin in The Platonick Lady by Susanna Centlivre (1706)
- Jo in Adventures in Madrid by Mary Pix (1706)
- Sergeant Kite in The Recruiting Officer by George Farquhar (1706)
- Saunter in The Double Gallant by Colley Cibber (1707)
- Orangewoman in The Fine Lady's Airs by Thomas Baker (1708)
- Marplot in The Busie Body by Susanna Centlivre (1709)
- Sir Threadbare in The Rival Fools by Colley Cibber (1709)
- Mizen in The Fair Quaker of Deal by Charles Shadwell (1710)
- Antonio in The City Ramble by Elkanah Settle (1711)
- Plotwell in The Apparition by Anonymous (1713)
- Bite in The Female Advocates by William Taverner (1713)
- Decoy in The Doating Lovers by Newburgh Hamilton (1715)
- Sir Anthony Thinwit in The Perplexed Couple by Charles Molloy (1715)
- Frank Flash in The Artful Husband by William Taverner (1717)
- Madame Filette in The Coquet by Charles Molloy (1718)
- Obadiah Prim in A Bold Stroke for a Wife by Susanna Centlivre (1718)
- Sir Vanity Halfwit in Kensington Gardens by John Leigh (1719)
- Teartext in The Chimera by Thomas Odell (1721)

== Bibliography ==
- Caines, Michael in The Plays and Poems of Nicholas Rowe, Volume I: The Early Plays. Taylor & Francis, 2016.
- Heard, Elisabeth J. Experimentation on the English Stage, 1695–1708: The Career of George Farquhar. Routledge, 2015.
