= 1701 in literature =

This article contains information about the literary events and publications of 1701.

== Events ==
- January
  - Matthew Prior, English poet, enters Parliament as the member for East Grinstead.
  - George Granville's The Jew of Venice, an adaptation of The Merchant of Venice, receives its première at Lincoln's Inn Fields, with Thomas Betterton as Bassanio. It is so popular it displaces the original from the stage for the next four decades.
- July 9 – St Patrick's Cathedral, Dublin, makes a grant for work on Marsh's Library, newly established by Narcissus Marsh (Archbishop of Dublin (Church of Ireland)) as the first public library in Ireland (architect: Sir William Robinson) with refugee French Huguenot scholar Élie Bouhéreau as its first librarian.
- September 7 – The Treaty of Den Haag is the catalyst for the War of the Spanish Succession, which will continue and have frequent discussion in literature until 1713.
- unknown date – Biblioteca Casanatense in Rome is established by the Dominican Order.

== New books ==
=== Prose ===
- Daniel Defoe, The Original Power of the Collective Body of the People of England
- John Dennis, The Advancement and Reformation of Modern Poetry
- Richard Steele, The Christian Hero
- Jonathan Swift, A Discourse of the Contests and Dissensions Between the Nobles and the Commons in Athens and Rome
- William Temple (posthumously), Miscellanea: the Third Part
- John Toland, The Art of Governing by Partys
- Benjamin Whichcote, Several Discourses, posthumously published in four volumes, from this year to 1707

=== Drama ===
- Thomas Baker, The Humour of the Age
- Roger Boyle, 1st Earl of Orrery (died 1679), Altemira
- William Burnaby, The Ladies Visiting Day
- Colley Cibber, Love Makes a Man (published; performed 13 December 1700; combines two Beaumont and Fletcher plays: The Custom of the Country and The Elder Brother
- William Congreve, The Judgment of Paris: A masque (performed in March)
- Thomas D'Urfey, The Bath; or, The Western Lass: A comedy
- George Farquhar, Sir Harry Wildair, performed about April; sequel to The Constant Couple 1699
- Charles Gildon, Love's Victim: or, the Queen of Wales: A tragedy (published anonymously, performed)
- George Granville, The Jew of Venice: A comedy (adaptation of Shakespeare's The Merchant of Venice, published anonymously, performed about May)
- Peter Anthony Motteux, The Masque of Acis and Galatea (performed about March)
- Mary Pix, The Double Distress (performed about March)
- Nicholas Rowe
  - The Ambitious Stepmother (possibly performed in December)
  - Tamerlane (performed in December)
- Elkanah Settle, The Virgin Prophetess
- Sir Edward Sherburne (translator and editor) The Tragedies of Seneca the Younger (L. Annaeus Seneca)
- Richard Steele, The Funeral: or, Grief a-la-mode: A comedy (published, despite year 1702 given, performed)
- Catherine Trotter, later Cockburn:
  - Love at a Loss; or, Most Votes Carry It: A comedy (performed November 23, 1700)
  - The Unhappy Penitent (performed February 4)
- Jane Wiseman, Antiochus the Great (performed in November)

=== Poetry ===
- Lady Mary Chudleigh, The Ladies Defiance: Or, the Bride-woman's Counsellor Answer'd
- Jeremy Collier (translator), The Great Historical, Geographical, Genealogical and Poetical Dictionary, translated from Louis Moreri, Le Grand Dictionnaire historique (continuation "by another hand", published 1705)
- Daniel Defoe, The True-Born Englishman (satire on John Tutchin)
- Peter Anthony Motteux - A Poem in Praise of Tea
- John Norris, An Essay Towards the Theory of the Ideal or Intelligible World
- John Philips, The Sylvan Dream
- Pavao Ritter Vitezović, Stemmatografia, an illustrated heraldic essay written mostly in verse

== Births ==
- March 2 – Lewis Morris, Welsh lexicographer and writer (died 1765)
- March 12 – Johann Friedrich Cotta, German theologian (died 1779)
- unknown dates
  - Matthew Concanen, Irish wit, poet and playwright (died 1749)
  - Wu Jingzi, Chinese scholar and novelist (died 1754)

== Deaths ==
- June 2 – Madeleine de Scudéry, French salonnière (born 1607)
- August 1 – Jan Chryzostom Pasek, Polish memoirist (born 1636)
- August 20 – Sir Charles Sedley, 5th Baronet, English playwright (born 1639)
- August 24 – Ahasverus Fritsch, German poet and legal writer (born 1629)
- September 15 – Edmé Boursault, French dramatist (born 1638)
