= 1710 in literature =

This article contains information about the literary events and publications of 1710.

== Events ==
- February – A year after the death of the poet, Edmund Smith prints a "Poem to the Memory of Mr. John Philips". Other memorials this year include "A Poem to the Memory of the Incomparable Mr. Philips" by Leonard Welsted. A monument to him is erected by Lord Harcourt in Westminster Abbey, between those to Geoffrey Chaucer and Michael Drayton, with the motto "Honos erit huic quoque pomo" (Honor this fruit) from the title page of Philips' work Cyder.
- February 8 – Antoine Houdar de la Motte is elected to the Académie française, taking the seat vacated by Thomas Corneille.
- April 10 – The Statute of Anne, the first modern copyright act, comes into force in the Kingdom of Great Britain.
- April 28 – After Thomas Betterton's death this day, the great Shakespearean roles he dominated for a generation are divided among fellow actors Barton Booth, Robert Wilks and John Mills (who gets Macbeth).
- September 2 – Jonathan Swift, in London, begins his series of letters to Esther Johnson, which will be collected after his death as A Journal to Stella.
- November 6 – Colley Cibber becomes joint manager of the Theatre Royal, Drury Lane, London.

== New books ==
=== Prose ===
- Joseph Addison – The Whig Examiner (periodical)
- John Arbuthnot - An Argument for Divine Providence, taken from the Constant Regularity observed in the Births of both Sexes
- John Bellers – Some Reasons for an European State proposed to the Powers of Europe
- George Berkeley – A Treatise Concerning the Principles of Human Knowledge
- Laurent Bordelon – A history of the ridiculous extravagancies of Monsieur Oufle
- Lady Mary Chudleigh – Essays Upon Several Occasions
- Colley Cibber – The Secret History of Arlus and Odolphus (roman à clef)
- Anthony Collins – A Vindication of the Divine Attributes
- Anthony Ashley Cooper, 3rd Earl of Shaftesbury – Soliloquy
- Daniel Defoe – An Essay Upon Public Credit (on the balance of trade)
- George Hickes – A Second Collection of Controversial Letters relating to the Church of England and the Church of Rome, as they passed between an honourable lady and Dr. George Hickes
- Gottfried Leibniz – Essais de Théodicée sur la bonté de Dieu, la liberté de l'homme et l'origine du mal ("Essays of theodicy on the goodness of God, the freedom of man and the origin of evil")
- John Leland (d.1552) – The Itinerary of John Leland the Antiquary
- Delarivier Manley (as Eginardus) – Memoirs of Europe, towards the close of the eighth century (satire)
- Cotton Mather – Bonifacius: Essays To Do Good
- François Pétis de la Croix – Les Mille et un jours (translation and adaptation of Hazár ú Yek Rúz (The Thousand and One Days))
- Samuel Richter (as Sincerus Renatus) – Die wahrhaffte und volkommene Bereitung des philosophischen Steins der Brüderschaft aus dem Orden des Gülden und Rosen Kreutzes (The True and Complete Preparation of the Philosophical Stone of the Brotherhood, from the Order of the Golden and Rosy Cross, i. e. Rosicrucians)
- Jonathan Swift – A Meditation Upon a Broom-Stick
- Ned Ward (as the Author of the London-Spy) – Nuptial Dialogues and Debates; or, a useful prospect of the felicities and discomforts of a marry'd life, incident to all degrees, from the throne to the cottage
- Christian Wolff – Anfangsgründe aller mathematischen Wissenschaften
- Various
  - The Examiner: Remarks upon Papers and Occurrences (periodical edited by Jonathan Swift)
  - The Medley (a miscellany by Arthur Manwaring and other Whigs)

=== Drama ===
- William Congreve – Semele, an "unacted opera"
- Aaron Hill – Elfrid
- Charles Johnson – The Force of Friendship
- Charles Shadwell – The Fair Quaker Of Deal

=== Poetry ===
- George Farquhar – Barcellona: a poem; or, the Spanish expedition under the command of Charles Earl of Peterborough (epic)
- Ambrose Philips – Pastorals (igniting argument with Alexander Pope)

== Births ==
- April 13 – Jonathan Carver, American writer and explorer (died 1780)
- April 26 – Thomas Reid, Scottish philosophical writer (died 1796)
- October 24 – Alban Butler, English hagiographer (died 1773)
- November 8 – Sarah Fielding, English novelist (died 1768)
- November 13 – Charles Simon Favart, French dramatist (died 1792)
- November 27 – Robert Lowth, English poet, grammarian and bishop (died 1787)
- unknown dates
  - George Alexander Stevens, English dramatist, poet and actor (died 1780)
  - Floyer Sydenham, English classicist (died 1787)

== Deaths ==
- February 16 – Esprit Fléchier, French preacher and memoirist (born 1632)
- February 17 – George Bull, English theologian and bishop (born 1634)
- April 28 – Thomas Betterton, English actor-manager (born c. 1635)
- July 8 – Jean Donneau de Visé, French historian, publicist and playwright (born 1638)
- November 1 – Michael Kongehl, German poet (died 1646)
- December 14 – Henry Aldrich, English theologian and philosopher (born 1647)
- December 15 (burial) – Lady Mary Chudleigh, English poet (born 1656)
- Probable year – Marcus Meibomius, Danish Biblical scholar and classicist (born c. 1630)
