= 1700s in literature =

== Events ==
- 1709 : Tatler founded by Richard Steele

== New books and plays ==
- 1700: The Way of the World by William Congreve
- 1702: The Shortest Way with the Dissenters by Daniel Defoe
- 1703: Hymn to the Pillory by Daniel Defoe
- 1704: The Campaign by Joseph Addison; Miscellany Poems by William Wycherley
- 1705: The Mistake by Sir John Vanbrugh; The Gamester by Susanna Centlivre
- 1706: The Recruiting Officer (play) – George Farquhar
- 1707: Essay Concerning the Use of Reason – Anthony Collins; The Beaux' Stratagem – George Farquhar

== Births ==
- June 28, 1703 : John Wesley (died 1791)
- April 22, 1707 : Henry Fielding (died 1754)
- September 18, 1709 : Samuel Johnson (died 1784)

== Deaths ==
- May 12, 1700 : John Dryden (born 1631)
- May 26, 1703 : Samuel Pepys (born 1633)
- February 27, 1706 : John Evelyn (born 1620)

== See also ==
- List of years in literature
