= The Man's Bewitched =

1709 play

- Original language: English
- Written by: Susanna Centlivre
- Genre: Comedy

Premiere
- Date: 12 December 1709
- Place: Queen's Theatre, Haymarket, London

The Man's Bewitched is a 1709 comedy play by the British writer Susanna Centlivre. It is known by the longer title The Man's Bewitch'd; or, The Devil to do about Her.

The original Haymarket cast included John Bowman as Sir Jeffrey Constant, John Mills as Captain Constant, Benjamin Husband as Lovely, Robert Wilks as Faithful, Benjamin Johnson as Sir David Watchman, Richard Estcourt as Trust, Thomas Doggett as Num, Richard Cross as Slouch, William Pinkethman as Clinch, William Bullock as Roger, Colley Cibber as Manage, Anne Oldfield as Belinda, Mary Porter as Maria, Margaret Saunders as Dorothy and Margaret Bicknell as Lucy.

== Bibliography ==
- Burling, William J. A Checklist of New Plays and Entertainments on the London Stage, 1700-1737. Fairleigh Dickinson Univ Press, 1992.
- Nicoll, Allardyce. History of English Drama, 1660-1900, Volume 2. Cambridge University Press, 2009.
