= Busybody =

Person who meddles in the affairs of others

A busybody caricatured by Isaac Taylor in the 19th century to illustrate the character sketch by Theophrastus

A busybody, meddler, nosey parker, or marplot is someone who meddles in the affairs of others.

An early study of this archetype was made by the ancient Greek philosopher Theophrastus in his typology, Characters, writing that "In the proffered services of the busybody there is much of the affectation of kind-heartedness, and little efficient aid."

== Etymology of "marplot" ==
Susanna Centlivre wrote a successful play, The Busie Body, which was first performed in 1709 and has been revived repeatedly since. It is a farce in which a man called "Marplot" interferes in the romantic affairs of his friends and, despite being well-meaning, frustrates them. The characterisation of Marplot as a busybody whose "chief pleasure is knowing everybody's business" was so popular that he appeared as the title character in a sequel, Marplot. The name is a pun — mar / plot — and passed into the language as an eponym or personification of this type.

== English law ==
In English law, the doctrine of locus standi requires a plaintiff to have some connection with the matter being contested. In two cases in 1957 and 1996, Lord Denning ruled that "The court will not listen to a busybody who is interfering in things which do not concern him..." Similarly, there is a long-standing rule that a person must have an insurable interest in a property or person that they wish to insure. The "officious bystander" is a metaphorical character in English law, used to determine the implied terms of a contract.

== Bible ==
In the Bible, the word "busybody" is used by Paul the Apostle (1 Timothy 5:13). The root word is Greek, περίεργος (periergos), which may also be translated as a worker of magic or witch. Strong's number for this is G4021.

And withal they learn to be idle, wandering about from house to house; and not only idle, but tattlers also and busybodies, speaking things which they ought not.

— 1 Timothy 5:13
