= The Basset Table =

The Basset Table is an English-language play by Susanna Centlivre which emphasizes the vice of gambling and its "sexual dangers". It is named for the basset table, a type of card table common in 18th century gambling establishments where basset was played. It was first staged at the Theatre Royal, Drury Lane on 20 November 1705, and was published in London a day later with Centlivre hiding her identity by naming the playwright as "the author of The Gamester. Like The Gamester, the work centers around two pairs of lovers: Lord Worthy and Lady Reveller; and Lady Lucy and Sir James Courtly. It was not a success, and only ran for four performances. It was never revived during her lifetime.

Both a morality play and a comedy, Centlivre attempted to design The Basset Table as a work for social good that would motivate her audience to abandon vice by making it ridiculous. Gambling was crafted as both a subject of mirth and of scorn. University of Aberdeen scholar Derek Hughes stated that the work was part of a group 18th century British plays that "contribute to wider satire of waste, conspicuous consumption and luxury, reflecting the rapid growth of London as a residential and commercial centre." Long neglected, the work was successfully staged by Polly Irvin for the Old Vic Theatre Company in 1998 with Harriet Thorpe as Lady Reveller, Tom McGovern as Sir James Courtly, and Sara Powell as Lady Lucy.
