= Benjamin Husband =

British stage actor

Benjamin Husband was a British stage actor of the eighteenth century. His surname is sometimes written as Husbands.

Reportedly born in Pembrokeshire in 1672, he was a member of the Lincolns Inn Fields and Drury Lane companies during the 1700s. He was later in Dublin as part of the Smock Alley Theatre organisation. When he had a benefit there in 1746, he was described as the oldest living actor.

== Selected roles ==
- Tyranges in The Double Distress by Mary Pix (1701)
- Zama in Tamerlane by Nicholas Rowe (1702)
- Alphonso in All for the Better by Francis Manning (1702)
- Richemore in The Twin Rivals by George Farquhar (1702)
- Lorenzo in The Patriot by Charles Gildon (1702)
- Don Philip in She Would and She Would Not by Colley Cibber (1702)
- Albovade in The Faithful Bride of Granada by William Taverner (1704)
- Viceroy in The Revolution of Sweden by Catharine Cockburn (1706)
- Bellmour in Adventures in Madrid by Mary Pix (1706)
- Offa in The Royal Convert by Nicholas Rowe (1707)
- Lovely in The Man's Bewitched by Susanna Centlivre (1709)
- Valerius in Appius and Virginia by John Dennis (1709)
- Catesby in Jane Shore by Nicholas Rowe (1714)

== Bibliography ==
- Highfill, Philip H, Burnim, Kalman A. & Langhans, Edward A. A Biographical Dictionary of Actors, Actresses, Musicians, Dancers, Managers, and Other Stage Personnel in London, 1660–1800: Volume VIII. SIU Press, 1978.
