= Margaret Mills (actress) =

British stage actress (died 1717)

Margaret Mills (died 1717) was a British stage actress of the late seventeenth and early eighteenth century.

She was a long-standing member of the Drury Lane company. She was the wife of the actor John Mills who also acted at Drury Lane. Their son William Mills was born in 1701, and also acted at Drury Lane.

== Selected roles ==
- Emilia in Neglected Virtue by Charles Hopkins (1696)
- Phoebe in The Lost Lover by Delarivier Manley (1696)
- Zada in Ibrahim, the Thirteenth Emperor of the Turks by Mary Pix (1696)
- Margaret in The Cornish Comedy by George Powell (1696)
- Trudge in Love and a Bottle by George Farquhar (1698)
- Lettice in The Fair Example by Richard Estcourt (1703)
- Betty in The Platonick Lady by Susanna Centlivre (1706)
- Gipsey in The Beaux' Stratagem by George Farquhar (1707)
- Bianca in Sauny the Scot by John Lacy (1707)
- Scentwell in The Busie Body by Susanna Centlivre (1709)

== Bibliography ==
- Straub, Kristina, G. Anderson, Misty and O'Quinn, Daniel. The Routledge Anthology of Restoration and Eighteenth-Century Drama. Taylor & Francis, 2017.
