= Irish Hospitality, or, Virtue Rewarded =

1720 play

Irish Hospitality, or, Virtue Rewarded is one of the lesser-known works of the inconspicuous playwright Charles Shadwell, son of the far more renowned playwright and poet laureate Thomas Shadwell. It was published in his Five New Plays in 1720, and it is not known if it was ever acted at the time. In 1766 it was staged at the Drury Lane Theatre.

There are no extremes of virtue or vice in this play, which rather celebrates the 18th-century concept of "good nature", personified by the middle-aged squire Sir Patrick Worthy. Spirited young women are commended and the Irish squirarchy's lumpish obsession with creature comforts is upbraided. Sir Patrick arranges suitable marriages for his entire family, without regard to money, and the high point of the action is his benevolent tricking of his unprincipled son Charles into making an honest woman out of a serving-girl he (Charles) has debauched.
