= The Rival Sisters =

1695 play

- Original language: English
- Written by: Robert Gould
- Genre: Tragedy

Premiere
- Date: October 1695
- Place: Theatre Royal, Drury Lane, London

The Rival Sisters: or, The Violence of Love is a 1695 tragedy by the English writer Robert Gould. Gould's previous attempt to have a tragedy Innocence Distress'd staged by the United Company was blocked and by the time his second work was performed he had given up writing.

== Place premiered and production company ==
It premiered at Drury Lane where it was produced by Christopher Rich's company.

== Cast ==
The original cast included Thomas Disney as Vilarezo, John Verbruggen as Sebastian, George Powell as Antonio, Joseph Williams as Alonzo, Hildebrand Horden as Vilander, Benjamin Johnson as Gerardo, Thomas Kent as Diego, Frances Maria Knight as Catalina, Jane Rogers as Berinthia, Letitia Cross as Alphanta and Susanna Verbruggen as Ansilva. Incidental music was composed for the play by Henry Purcell.

== Bibliography ==
- Deborah Payne Fisk & J. Douglas Canfield. Cultural Readings of Restoration and Eighteenth-Century English Theater. University of Georgia Press, 2010.
- Price, Curtis A. Henry Purcell and the London Stage. Cambridge University Press, 1984.
