= The Busie Body =

1709 play

- Original language: English
- Written by: Susanna Centlivre
- Genre: Comedy

Premiere
- Date: 12 May 1709
- Place: Theatre Royal, Drury Lane, London

The Busie Body is a Restoration comedy written by Susanna Centlivre and first performed at the Drury Lane Theatre in 1709. It focuses on the legalities of what constitutes a marriage, and how children might subvert parental power over whom they can marry. The Busie Body was the most popular female authored-play of the eighteenth century, and became a stock piece of most anglophone theatres during the period.

The original Drury Lane cast featured Robert Wilks as Sir George Airy, Richard Estcourt as Sir Francis Gripe, John Mills as Charles, William Bullock as Sir Jealous Traffick, George Pack as Marplot, Christopher Bullock as Whisper, Jane Rogers as Isabinda, Letitia Cross as Miranda, Margaret Saunders as Patch and Margaret Mills as Scentwell. The prologue was written by Thomas Baker.

== Characters ==
Miranda – The heroine, an orphaned heiress. She loves Sir George Airy, but her father's will specifies that she will lose her inheritance if she marries before twenty-five without obtaining the written permission of her guardian, Sir Francis Gripe.

Isabinda – The daughter of Sir Jealous Traffick. She is in love with Charles, but Sir Jealous plans to marry her to Seignior Diego Babinetto.

Patch – Isabinda's servant.

Scentwell – Miranda's servant.

Sir George Airy – A rich gentleman with an income of £4000 a year. He is in love with Miranda, and also with his 'incognita', a lady who meets him in disguise.

Sir Francis Gripe – A miser. Charles's father, and Miranda's guardian. He plans to marry Miranda for her youth and fortune, and under Miranda's father's will, she needs Sir Francis's permission to marry before she is twenty-five.

Charles – Sir Francis's son, George's friend. In love with Isabinda.

Whisper – Charles's servant.

Sir Jealous Traffick – A man obsessed with Spain. Isabinda's father. He plans to marry her to a Spanish gentleman, Seignior Diego Babinetto.

Marplot – The well-meaning but foolish busy-body of the title, meddles in the characters' romantic affairs with humorous results. He is also a ward of Sir Francis Gripe.

Servants to Sir Jealous Traffick

== Plot ==
=== Act 1 ===
Scene 1. The play opens in St James's Park. Charles and Sir George Airy meet. Charles complains of his father's stinginess, and the way his foster-sister Miranda acts like his 'mother-in-law'. Sir George Airy is in love with two women: Miranda herself, and a mysterious 'incognita' who regularly meets him in disguise.

Marplot arrives. He begs Charles, his foster-brother, to introduce him to Sir George. They discuss several of Marplot's foolish escapades. Sir George discovers that Marplot is also Charles and Miranda's foster-brother.

Charles tries to have a private conversation with Sir George, but Sir George leaves to meet Sir Francis. These exchanges pique Marplot's curiosity. Whisper arrives, and tells Charles that Isabinda cannot meet him in the Park, but invites him to a clandestine rendezvous at her house when Sir Jealous is due to be out. They all exit.

Meanwhile, Miranda arrives in a sedan chair. She meets Patch, the servant of her friend Isabinda, Charles's lover. They discuss Isabinda's impending marriage to Seignior Diego Babinetto, a man she has never met. As they are talking, Sir George re-enters with Sir Francis Gripe, Miranda's guardian. It is revealed that Miranda herself is George's 'incognita'. She overhears Sir George and Sir Francis come to an arrangement: Sir George will pay Sir Francis 100 guineas for one hour's conversation with Miranda, with Sir Francis at the other end of the room.

After Sir Francis leaves, Miranda and Sir George have a witty conversation about love and marriage.

=== Act 2 ===
Scene 1. At Sir Francis Gripe's house, Sir Francis and Miranda, his ward, discuss the arrangement with Sir George. Miranda pretends to have contempt for Sir George, and says she will marry Sir Francis tomorrow if only he will give her control of her estate. Sir Francis says he will settle the estate on her after their wedding. Miranda tells Sir Francis her plan for Sir George's visit: she will refuse to speak to him, no matter what he says. Sir Francis is delighted, believing that Miranda is slighting Sir George out of loyalty to him. In reality, she wishes to sound out Sir George, and conceal that she is his 'incognita'.

Charles enters, and begs Sir Francis for money. Miranda leaves, and Sir Francis berates his son for his extravagance. Charles denies he is a spendthrift, observing that his miserly father doesn't give him any money to waste. He also points out that he is entitled to his dead uncle's estate, which Sir Francis refuses to relinquish. Marplot enters, begging £100 from Sir Francis (his guardian). Charles leaves, and Marplot runs off to try and follow him.

Sir George enters, then Miranda. The famous 'dumb scene' ensues. Sir George tries to address Miranda, but she refuses to speak. He tells her to speak using sign-language, but she deliberately uses the wrong signs. He then impersonates her, pretending to answer his questions on her behalf. As she does not speak, he fails to realise that Miranda is the same person as his 'incognita'. Miranda leaves, and Sir Francis laughs at Sir George for thinking that Miranda would be interested in him.

Scene 2. At Sir Jealous Traffick's house, Sir Jealous is berating his daughter Isabinda for standing out on the balcony. He praises the more modest customs of Spain, where ladies are veiled and don't display themselves in public. Patch, Isabinda's servant, pretends to agree with him. Isabinda puts up a spirited defence of English customs.

Sir Jealous and Isabinda leave, and Whisper enters. Whisper is the servant of Charles, Isabinda's secret lover, and tells Patch that Charles is on the way to meet Isabinda secretly. Sir Jealous re-enters, and Whisper tries to cover by claiming he has entered the house in search of a lap-dog.

Scene 3. At Charles's lodging, Marplot gives Charles the £100. Charles promises to pay him back, as Sir George enters, greatly disappointed by his conversation with Miranda. Marplot insists there must have been a 'trick' in the case, and offers to bring 'intelligence' from her to Sir George. Sir George engages him to do so.

=== Act 3 ===
Scene 1. Charles waits anxiously outside Sir Jealous's house. Patch invites him in. Marplot sees everything, and decides to stay and watch what happens.

Scene 2. Inside, Charles and Isabinda declare their love for one another. Patch rushes in—Sir Jealous has returned! Charles escapes to the balcony.

Scene 3. Outside the house, Sir Jealous is accosted by Marplot, who foolishly reveals that an 'honest gentleman' (i.e. Charles) has entered the house. Sir Jealous is furious, beats Marplot, and rushes inside. Charles drops down from the balcony, and Marplot tells him what has happened. Charles rushes off in a rage. Marplot decides to go and see Miranda. Sir Jealous comes out of the house again, with his servants. Isabinda and Patch follow shortly after, and Sir Jealous berates Isabinda. Patch again pretends to be on Sir Jealous's side. Sir Jealous heads off to try and catch the intruder with his servants. Isabinda and Patch wonder who it was that betrayed Charles's presence in the house.

Scene 4. Sir Francis and Miranda laugh about the 'dumb scene' with Sir George. Marplot enters, and criticises Sir Francis for duping Sir George, whom he describes as his 'friend'. Miranda sees an opening. She tells Sir Francis that Sir George has been loitering by the garden gate, hoping to see her, and instructs Marplot to tell Sir George that she is devoted to Sir Francis, and will have the men fire on Sir George if he is ever seen at the garden gate again. In an aside, she reveals her true motives: Sir George has in fact never loitered by the gate, but she hopes he will take the hint and come to her. Sir Francis is convinced by Miranda's act. Believing she will marry him tomorrow, he agrees to sign a document giving his consent for her to marry, thus freeing her from the conditions of her father's will.

Scene 5. In a tavern, Sir George and Charles bewail their complicated love lives. Marplot enters with Miranda's message. Catching on, Sir George decides to go to the garden-gate tonight. Marplot suspects something, and decides to secretly follow him there.

=== Act 4 ===
Scene 1. Outside Sir Jealous Traffick's house, Whisper gives Patch a letter for Isabinda from Charles, which is written in code. Charles is on the way to meet Isabinda. Whisper leaves, and as Patch re-enters the house she accidentally drops the letter. Sir Jealous arrives, happy with the news that Seignior Diego Babinetto has arrived in London to marry Isabinda. He is less happy when he finds the letter Patch has dropped, and storms inside.

Scene 2. Inside, Patch and Isabinda confer, and Patch realises she has dropped the letter. Sir Jealous enters in a rage, accusing Isabinda of keeping up a secret correspondence, and demanding that she decipher the strange code. But Patch pretends the letter is actually a 'charm for the toothache' that she bought from a local wise woman. Isabinda desperately plays for time, knowing that Charles will arrive any minute. She takes the opportunity of the letter to berate her father for suspecting her. He tells her the Seignior has arrived and will wed her tomorrow. She plays a tune on the spinet, while Charles enters the house through the balcony and opens the door from Isabinda's room. Seeing Sir Jealous is there, he retreats, but not before Sir Jealous sees him. Seeing the truth, he dismisses Patch from her post, and tells Isabinda he will move her into the back of the house, where there is no balcony.

Scene 3. Outside, Sir Jealous sends Patch away. He goes back inside, and Charles enters. He comforts Patch, saying he will look after her now she has been fired, and they hatch a plan together: Charles will impersonate Seignior Diego Babinetto, and marry Isabinda in his stead tomorrow.

Scene 4. Sir George arrives at the garden gate of Sir Francis's house, and is admitted by Scentwell, Miranda's servant.

Scene 5. Sir George and Miranda meet and declare their love for one another. Now that Miranda has secured written consent from Sir Francis, they plan to elope and marry immediately. Sir Francis returns unexpectedly with Marplot, and Sir George hides behind the chimney-board. Sir Francis is eating an orange, and tries to throw the peel behind the chimney-board, so Miranda pretends she is keeping a pet monkey there. Marplot begs to see the monkey, but Miranda protests and Sir Francis prevents it. Sir Francis decides to leave on his errand, and leaves with Miranda and the others, leaving only Marplot behind. Marplot lifts the chimney-board, and discovers Sir George. Marplot tells him to flee through a certain door, and to smash some china on the way out. Sir Francis, Miranda and Scentwell re-enter, and Marplot claims that the monkey escaped. Sir Francis finally leaves, Sir George emerges again, and Patch enters with news that Charles has a scheme, and needs Sir George's help. They all leave together.

=== Act 5 ===
Scene 1. In Sir Francis's house, Miranda, Patch and Scentwell discuss Miranda's new condition: she has just married Sir George. She orders Scentwell to pack her things so she can leave the house before Sir Francis returns. Unexpectedly, he returns. To get him out of the house, Miranda and Patch tell him about Isabinda's impending nuptials, which he agrees to go and witness with them.

Scene 2. In Sir Jealous's house, Charles arrives in his Spanish disguise. Sir George pretends to be 'Mr Meanwell', his English agent. They persuade Sir Jealous that Charles is the real Seignior Diego. Isabinda protests that she does not wish to marry this stranger against her will, but when Sir Jealous steps away, she is told by Sir George that this 'Seignior Diego' is actually her lover Charles. They all go into the next room to perform the wedding.

Scene 3. Outside Sir Jealous's house, Marplot is hunting for Charles. He knows that Charles is in a Spanish costume, and when he discovers that a man in Spanish clothes has entered Sir Jealous's house, he demands admission.

Scene 4. Inside, Marplot tells Sir Jealous that 'Seignior Diego' is actually Charles, the son of Sir Francis Gripe. But it is too late. Isabinda and Charles are already married. Miranda arrives with Sir Francis and the servants. Sir Jealous accuses Sir Francis of being involved in his son's deception. He disclaims Charles, and says he will disinherit him in favour of his children by Miranda. Miranda reveals that she is married to Sir George, and hands Charles the papers to his uncle's estate. Sir Francis storms off in a rage. Sir Jealous makes peace with Charles and Isabinda. The play ends with a dance, where Sir Jealous concludes:

"By my Example let all Parents move,

And never strive to cross their Childrens Love;

But still submit that Care to Providence above."

== Reception ==
The play was very popular with audiences: there were 475 recorded performances during the eighteenth century, and in reality the number was probably far higher. William Hazlitt said that The Busie Body had been played "a thousand times in town and country, giving delight to the old, the young, and the middle aged". Centlivre wrote a sequel featuring the character Marplot: Marplot, or the Second Part of the Busie Body (1710).

The Busie Body was revived at the Southwark Playhouse in 2012 (called "The Busy Body").

== Bibliography ==
- Burling, William J. A Checklist of New Plays and Entertainments on the London Stage, 1700-1737. Fairleigh Dickinson Univ Press, 1992.
- Nicoll, Allardyce. History of English Drama, 1660-1900, Volume 2. Cambridge University Press, 2009.
