= Robert Gould (poet) =

English writer

Robert Gould (1660? – 1708/1709) was a significant voice in Restoration poetry in England.

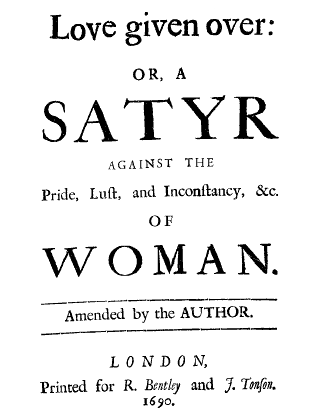
The title page to Love Given O'er.

He was born in the lower classes and orphaned when he was thirteen. It is possible that he had a sister, but her name and fate are unknown. Gould entered into domestic service. His first employer is unknown, but hints in his poetry indicate that it was a lady and that his job was as a footman. By the age of twenty, however, he had entered the employ of Charles Sackville, 6th Earl of Dorset. Dorset was known for his libertine lifestyle and his patronage of the arts, and Gould possibly learned to read and write and was afforded books to read while in Dorset's employ. He appears to have moved to the pantry side of domestic service.

== Poetry ==
Gould began his poetic career with a number of odes to peers, and his odes to ladies are particularly stylised and idealistic. In the seventeenth century, a writer of an ode could expect remuneration, either in the form of a gift or, at the least, a higher fee from the bookseller in anticipation of sales to the flattered subject's supporters and family. Gould did sell his odes, but he appears to have made very little by them. In 1683, however, Gould changed employers and made a name for himself as an author by writing Love Given O'er: Or a Satyr on the Inconstancy of Woman. The poem was at least partially an imitation of Juvenal, but it pursued its theme of misogyny with a fury and detail even Juvenal would not have dared.

It featured nearly pornographic detail. For example, Gould complains of the lust of women thus,

"And now, if so much to the World’s reveal’d,
Reflect on the vast store that lies conceal’d.
How, oft, into their Closets they retire,
Where flaming Dil– does inflame desire,
And gentle Lap-d--s feed the am’rous fire.
How curst is Man! when Brutes his Rivals prove,
Ev’n in the sacred business of his Love!
Unless Religion pious thoughts instil
Shew me the Woman that would not be ill,
If she, conveniently, cou’d have her will?" (lines 114-123)

1. A "closet" is a dressing-room or toilet.
2. The term "dildo" was capitalized, a la Rochester's To Seignore Dildo, and the omphalos is treated as a person, thus "Dildo does."
3. Suspicion over lapdogs was a fixture in misogynistic satire. Watteau even depicts inappropriate use of lapdogs in a painting.

These lines are less scathing than the repetition of the anecdote of the Ephesian lady (from Juvenal) who would meet her lovers at her husband's tomb, the statement that women envy the greatness of Eve's sin, and that a prostitute is far better than a wife, since she only damns the soul, while a wife will damn the soul and destroy all happiness. The poem is a merging of many tropes that were well established attacks on womankind before Gould, and the poem is programmatic in that it takes up the pride, then inconstancy, then lust of women (exactly as its title dictates). However, there is a remarkable amount of invention and specificity in each section, and those topoi he adapts from Classical and other poetry are always given a Restoration application. The particular vehemence in these scourges, along with the relentless pacing of the critique, make the poem stand out in its age and as an epitome of misogyny.

The poem sold extremely well and prompted a verse epistle battle from pretended "Sylvia"s ("Sylvia" having spurned the poet, he vows to be quit of love) who would offer to defend women from Gould's cruelty and pretended "answers" from the author of Love Given O'er (even though few of the "Sylvia" poems were by women, and only one of the "answer" poems was by Gould (a year after the publication of the Love Given O'er)) (Sloan). Gould enjoyed a high profile, and in the same year, 1683, Gould was employed by James Bertie, 1st Earl of Abingdon.

If Abingdon was not the one who encouraged the poem's composition, he at least enjoyed having the celebrated poet in his household. At around this time, Gould also became a friend of Fleetwood Sheppard's, who appeared to treat the poet with great generosity. The next poems from Gould continued the misogyny of Love Given O'er (e.g. A Satyr on Wooing, Epistle to One Made Unhappy in Marriage, A Scourge for Ill Wives, inter al.) and attempted to broaden out the satire into an attack on human vanity in particular and mankind in general. Gould's A Satyr on Mankind was, in its own day, noted for its excellence, and Alexander Pope paraphrases it. Additionally, Jonathan Swift uses some of the same satirical figures, and it is likely that both authors had read Gould in the 1709 version of his poems. Also in 1683 (on 17 June), Gould married Martha Roderick, and the two would later have a daughter named Hannah. Between 1683 and 1689, Gould produced a number of satires, some of them providing unique insight into the English Restoration. Satyr Upon the Play-House (1688), for example, attacked the parentage and pretense of Elizabeth Barry and Thomas Betterton, as well as the dissipate, drunken, whoring patrons of the theater. It records the life of London around Covent Garden, complete with demobbed soldiers, thieves, prostitutes, and the nobility who only cover their filth in gold, cosmetics, and perfumes. He also produced a few topical satires, such as To Julian, Secretary of the Muses, which attacks an anonymous lampoon author and gives specific detail about the personalities and personages of some of the dramatists of the day. He even wrote a poem in honour of a retarded villager of Lavington before, two years later, writing a violent attack on the stupidity and obduracy of all the "simple folk" of the country.

By 1689, Gould had been employed by Abingdon on his estates in West Lavington, Wiltshire, in some capacity other than as a domestic. In that year, Gould published Poems, Mostly Satyrs. The book was a last-chance effort at financial independence for Gould, and it appears to have succeeded. Gould left domestic service and, with the help of Abingdon, became a teacher full-time in West Lavington. However, the year after the publication of Poems, Gould engaged in a bitter exchange with the Poet Laureate, John Dryden. Gould was infuriated by Dryden's change of religion, and his Jack Squab (a reference to the Laureate being paid with food as well as brandy) was one of the most vicious (and uncharacteristically crude, for Gould) attacks made on Dryden. The poem is only attributed to Gould on slim evidence, as there are figures of speech and metaphors in it that closely resemble those employed by Gould in The Play-House, but it was not collected into his later Works (1709) and is unusually directed at a single public figure (where Gould's previous habit had been to attack a sin and provide numerous examples of it rather than to devote a whole poem to the viciousness of a single person).

After 1692 and the second edition of Poems, mostly Satyrs, Gould did not publish again until his death (excepting The Rival Sisters, see below). Having left the household of a peer and having left London, Gould had few occasions for urbane satires. However, the profession of school master apparently left the author with time for revision, for during the two decades that followed, he revised and edited and supplemented his poems extensively. In 1709, Martha Gould, Robert's wife, had Works of Robert Gould published. Robert Gould himself died in January 1709 (1708 in the Old Style), before the volume's publication. However, the text of the Works has high authority, and every element of the volume appears to have been carefully set by the author. The Satyr on Mankind and Satyr on the Play House, in particular, were vastly rewritten.

== As a tragedian ==
Gould also wrote tragedy. His first tragedy, Innocence Distress'd, was never performed. He took it to the United Company soon after writing it, in 1689. Thomas Betterton was the de facto manager of the theater, and Elizabeth Barry was one of the star actresses. Whether Gould had offended them prior to Satyr on the Play House or not, the two stars would not give him any aid after it. In October 1695, Gould's second tragedy, The Rival Sisters, was performed at Drury Lane, even though, again, Betterton and Barry opposed it. (By that time, Gould says in the introduction to the 1709 Works, Betterton had forgiven him, but Barry remained obstinate. Therefore, in the 1709 Works, Gould adds another section of the Satyr on the Play House just for Barry and lessens the invective against Betterton.) The tragedy had music by Henry Purcell, and it was a moderate success by the standards of that troubled year. (See Restoration drama for more on the crises of 1695.)

== Style and literary importance ==
In content, Gould was a sincere, harsh Royalist. In his satires, the families and ancestors of living noblemen are ridiculed viciously, if they took the Cromwellian side in the English Civil War. Additionally, Gould not only asserts Church of England positions, but he has nothing but vitriol for radical Protestants, from Richard Baxter to George Fox onward. His attacks on ladies and lords show all the marks of estrangement. They are attacked for being less than they would appear. Gould appeared to believe that the nobility should be, in fact, better than the general run of mankind. It is the lie that enrages him most, with betrayal being next in his catalogue of sins to lash.

Stylistically, Robert Gould's poetry looks forward somewhat to the poetry of the 1710s. He was the friend of John Oldham, and there is some similarity in poetic forms. He was also a friend of Fleetwood Shepheard, addressing several poems to him. Shepheard was a confidante to Matthew Prior and Thomas Rymer, and Shepheard gave both financial aid to Gould and personal friendship (Sloan). He wrote almost exclusively in closed heroic couplets. Other than Dryden, whose poetic output was lowering, few poets of the 1680s are well preserved, and Gould occupies an interesting position. He is a generation younger than the primary Restoration wits (Dryden, Rochester, Buckingham) and younger even than Aphra Behn. His is the first Restoration generation, and he had only stories about the Interregnum. He is additionally unique in the literature of the Restoration in being a servant who composed poetry. While the Restoration had many figures who rose from common, or even poor, families, Gould used his writing to win his independence in the most literal way. His pen earned him a profession other than servitude and enabled him to escape a menial life, and, at the same time, allowed him to treat wealthy and established figures on an even footing.

Although Gould was apparently well known to his own and the next two generations of poets, his reputation was virtually erased in the nineteenth century. By the 1730s, when Alexander Pope began to reject the "licentious" Restoration poets and other "Tory" writers gradually distanced themselves from the Cavalier wits, Gould's works fell out of publication and public consciousness. Because his satires are sexually frank and exceptionally vicious, he was wholly unacceptable to the Victorian era critics who attempted literary histories and were responsible for the twentieth century's canon formation in literature. At the end of the twentieth century, his name was revived as an example solely of "subliterary misogyny" by feminist literary critics such as Felicity Nussbaum, whose The Brink of All We Hate held out Gould's most scabrous satires (and almost exclusively Love Given O'er and the passage quoted above) as typical of an unpreserved tradition of misogyny. There remains one biography of Gould (by Eugene Sloan) and no contemporary edition of his works.

== Works ==
- Robert Gould, The Corruption of the Times by Money (London: Matthew Wotton, 1693).
