= Letitia Cross =

British singer and actress (1682–1737)

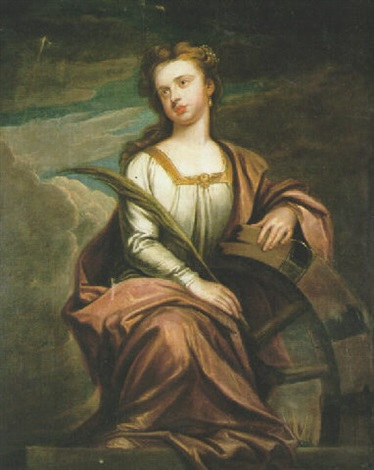
- Letitia Cross as Saint Catherine c. 1697 by Godfrey Kneller
- Born: 1682; Surrey, England
- Died: 4 April 1737 (aged 54–55); London, England
- Other names: Mrs Cross
- Occupations: Singer; actor
- Spouse: Peter Weir
- Partner: Peter the Great

Letitia Cross (baptised 6 March 1682 – died 4 April 1737) was a British soprano and actress. She appeared at the Drury Lane Theatre and was the mistress of Peter the Great while he visited England.

== Life ==
Cross was born in Surrey and it has been suggested that this was 1681 or 1682 based on later information she volunteered. She was baptised in Dorking on 6 March 1682. She was brought up in the theatre by her mother and her grandparents may have been Leonard and Ann Cross.

In 1694 whilst still a child she was a member of the Drury Lane/Dorset Garden theatre company in London. At that time it was the only theatre company but a group left which included Thomas Betterton. She sang songs by Henry Purcell whilst he was still alive as well as appearing in his unfinished opera The Indian Queen after his death. She sang in The Mock Marriage, The Rival Sisters and a version of The Tempest by John Dryden.

She sang in various other productions and in 1696 she appeared as herself in a satire and later in that year she was in The Relapse by John Vanbrugh.

In 1697 and 1698 Peter the Great embarked on his Grand Embassy. He visited London and Cross became his mistress. She was paid £500 as "a present" although she expected more. The Czar replied that he thought her overpaid. Later that same year she went to France with a "certain baronet".

In 1705 Thomas Clayton opened Arsinoe which was said to be the first English Opera designed "in the Italian style". Cross who had only recently returned to Drury Lane was amongst its principal players. The following month she was in Florimel and The Tender Husband in April. In 1706 she married Peter Weir but he was soon killed in Flanders. Cross created new roles such as Miranda in Susanna Centlivre's successful comedy play The Busy Body in 1709 which ran for 13 nights. The following year the Drury Lane Theatre became, after much disagreement, subject to new management by Robert Wilks, Colley Cibber and Thomas Doggett and they refused to honour a five-year contract she had signed the year before with the previous management. The management had to change their minds when 73 of her admirers signed a petition in her support. She was accused of orchestrating the scheme but she denied any complicity.

Cross had a benefit in 1732 where she returned to the stage for one night. She died at her home in Leicester Fields in London on 4 April 1737 leaving shares in the Lincoln's Inn Fields theatre and several mourning rings. There was a painting of her by Sir Godfrey Kneller as St Catherine in the 1690s and a matching print by John Smith.
