= Adventures in Madrid =

1706 play

- Original language: English
- Written by: Mary Pix
- Genre: Comedy

Premiere
- Date: June 1706
- Place: Queen's Theatre, Haymarket

Adventures in Madrid or The Adventures in Madrid is a 1706 comedy by the English writer Mary Pix. It was her final staged work.

It premiered at the Queen's Theatre in the Haymarket. The original cast featured John Freeman as Gomez, Barton Booth as Gaylord, Benjamin Husband as Bellmour, William Bowen as Gusman, John Corey as Don Philip, George Pack as Jo, William Fieldhouse as Pedro, Anne Bracegirdle as Laura, Elizabeth Barry as Clarinda, Elizabeth Bowman as Emelia and Margaret Bicknell as Lisset.

== Bibliography ==
- Burling, William J. A Checklist of New Plays and Entertainments on the London Stage, 1700-1737. Fairleigh Dickinson Univ Press, 1992.
- Nicoll, Allardyce. History of English Drama, 1660-1900, Volume 2. Cambridge University Press, 2009.
- Van Lennep, W. The London Stage, 1660-1800: Volume Two, 1700-1729. Southern Illinois University Press, 1960.
