= The Perjur'd Husband: or, The Adventures of Venice =

Tragicomedy written by Susanna Centlivre

The Perjur'd Husband: or, The Adventures of Venice is a tragicomedy written by Susanna Centlivre and first performed and printed in 1700. It was Centlivre's first published play.

== Plot ==
The play is set during the Venetian Carnival. Count Bassino, a rake, is married to Placentia but in love with Aurelia. Aurelia is betrothed to Alonzo, but falls in love with Bassino (whom she believes to be unmarried). Bassino's friend Armando is outraged at Bassino's behaviour, and fetches Placentia to Venice. Bassino promises to be faithful to his wife in future. However, he inadvertently drops a letter that suggests he means to marry Aurelia that very night.

Placentia disguises herself as Bassino's young brother-in-law in order to speak with Aurelia. She tries to persuade her against entering into a bigamous marriage with Bassino. She then reveals her true identity to Aurelia, but the younger woman remains defiant. Placentia draws her sword and stabs Aurelia. Bassino enters, sees Placentia and stabs her in turn. Alonzo then enters, fights with Bassino, and mortally wounds him. The dying Bassino, Aurelia and Placentia make peace with each other and with Alonzo.

The comic sub-plot has Lady Pizalta employ Ludvico, a male prostitute, in cuckolding her husband, Pizalto. Pizalto lusts after his wife's clever maid, Lucy, who agrees to sell him her virginity. He gives her a bond for 1,000 pistoles. Lucy persuades Ludvico to disguise himself in her clothes in order to sneak into Lady Pizalta's bedchamber, where he is discovered by Pizalto. Lucy defuses the situation and she also ends up keeping the bond that Pizalto had previously given her, without actually going through with sleeping with him. Both her master and mistress are forced to remain silent, in case Lucy reveals their secret infidelities.

== Reception ==
The Perjur'd Husband was probably first performed at Drury Lane, in or before October 1700. It was reprinted twice during the eighteenth century.

The play has been criticised as one of Centlivre's poorer quality plays, but Katherine Woodville suggests that it is nevertheless more interesting than it first appears, arguing that "I believe that critics do not look beyond the clunky verbiage. Beneath the dialogue Centlivre tackles feminist tribulations inherent within her society."

Paul Kies, writing in Modern Philology asserted that The Perjur'd Husband influenced Gotthold Ephraim Lessing's play Miss Sara Sampson (1755).
