= Love at a Venture =

Love at a Venture is an English-language play in four acts by Susanna Centlivre. It is based on Thomas Corneille's French-language play Le Galant doublé (1660). Centlivre departs from Corneille's work by adding in two original and substantial side plots, and by replacing French theatre conventions with English ones in the presentation of characters and plot construction.

A comedy, the play centers around two different romantic couples who are juxtaposed with one another. The flamboyant and roguish Bellair loves the demure Camilla, and the serious and steadfast Sir William Freelove loves the flirtatious and light-hearted Beliza who delights in her own wit. Secondary roles in the play include the comic parts of the servants Patch and Robin, and the role of Wou'dbe who achieves his humor through imitating Sir William.

Love at a Venture was first staged in 1706 at the New Theatre in Bath, England by the servants of Charles FitzRoy, 2nd Duke of Grafton. It was published in London that same year with the author concealing her identity by simply naming the playwright as "the author of The Gamester. Centlivre submitted her work to Colley Cibber for a potential staging at Theatre Royal, Drury Lane. Cibber rejected the work, only to steal much of it for his own play The Double Gallant (1707) in what was clearly a case of plagiarism.
