= The Different Widows =

Play by Mary Pix

- Original language: English
- Written by: Mary Pix
- Genre: Comedy

Premiere
- Date: November 1703
- Place: Lincoln's Inn Fields Theatre, London

The Different Widows is a 1703 comedy by the British writer Mary Pix.

It premiered at the Lincoln's Inn Fields Theatre in London. The original cast included George Powell as Sir James Belmont, John Corey as Careless, George Pack as Sir Anthony Loveman, Francis Leigh as Dandle, Barton Booth as Valentine, Elinor Leigh as Widow Bellmont, Mary Porter as Lady Loveman, Elizabeth Willis as Lady Courtall and Lucretia Bradshaw as Mariana.

== Bibliography ==
- Burling, William J. A Checklist of New Plays and Entertainments on the London Stage, 1700-1737. Fairleigh Dickinson Univ Press, 1992.
- Nicoll, Allardyce. History of English Drama, 1660-1900, Volume 2. Cambridge University Press, 2009.
