= The Platonick Lady =

Comedy play by Susanna Centlivre

- Original language: English
- Written by: Susanna Centlivre
- Genre: Comedy

Premiere
- Date: 25 November 1706
- Place: Queen's Theatre

The Platonick Lady is a 1706 comedy play by the British writer Susanna Centlivre. Staged at the Queen's Theatre in the Haymarket in November 1706, it was published the following year and is sometimes dated as 1707. In the play's preface the author defended the right of woman to write plays. The plot revolves around the question of platonic friendship.

The cast included Thomas Betterton as Sir Thomas Beaumont, Barton Booth as Sir Charles Richley, Robert Wilks as Captain Beaumont, Colley Cibber as Sharper, George Pack as Robin, Henry Norris as Equipage, Anne Bracegirdle as Lucinda, Anne Oldfield as Isabella, Margaret Bicknell as Toylet, William Bullock as Mrs Brazen, Elizabeth Willis as Mrs Dowdy, Margaret Mills as Betty and Elinor Leigh as Peeper.

== Bibliography ==
- Burling, William J. A Checklist of New Plays and Entertainments on the London Stage, 1700-1737. Fairleigh Dickinson Univ Press, 1992.
- Nachumi, Nora. Acting Like a Lady: British Women Novelists and the Eighteenth-century Theater. AMS Press, 2008.
