= Jane Shore (play) =

1714 play

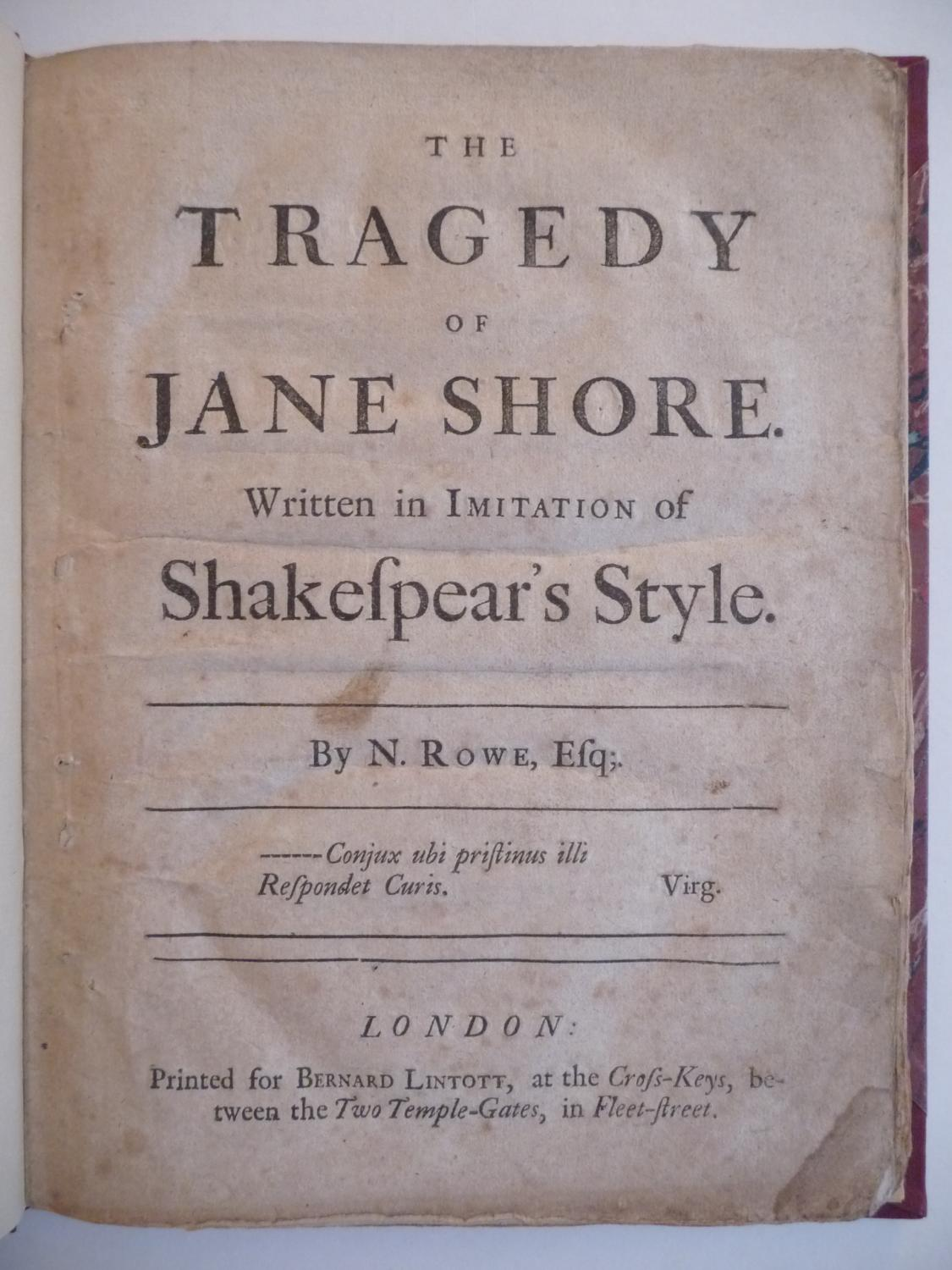
- Original language: English
- Written by: Nicholas Rowe
- Genre: Tragedy
- Setting: London, 15th century

Premiere
- Date: 2 February 1714
- Place: Theatre Royal, Drury Lane, London

The Tragedy of Jane Shore is a 1714 historical tragedy, written in blank verse after Shakespeare's verse dramas, by the British writer Nicholas Rowe. It was his penultimate play, and was inspired by the life of Jane Shore the mistress of King Edward IV.

It premiered at the Drury Lane Theatre in London on 2 February 1714. The original cast included Anne Oldfield as Jane Shore, Robert Wilks as Dumont, Colley Cibber as the Duke of Gloucester, Barton Booth as Lord Hastings, Benjamin Husband as Catesby, John Bowman as Sir Richard Radcliff, John Mills as Bellmour and Mary Porter as Alicia. The play was a major success, and was performed eighteen times by mid-March.

Rowe dedicated the published work to Charles Douglas, 3rd Duke of Queensberry, the son of the Second Duke who had employed Rowe as under-secretary when he was serving as Scottish Secretary between 1709 and 1711. Rowe wrote one further play Lady Jane Grey, another historical work set in England. In 1715 he was appointed as Poet Laureate by the new monarch George I, having been a strong supporter of the Hanoverian Succession that brought him to the throne.

== Bibliography ==
- Burling, William J. A Checklist of New Plays and Entertainments on the London Stage, 1700-1737. Fairleigh Dickinson Univ Press, 1992.
- Bullard, Rebecca & McTague, John. The Plays and Poems of Nicholas Rowe, Volume I: The Early Plays. Taylor & Francis, 2016.
- Wilson, Brett D. A Race of Female Patriots: Women and Public Spirit on the British Stage, 1688-1745. Lexington Books, 2012.
