= A Bold Stroke for a Wife =

1718 play by Susanna Centlivre

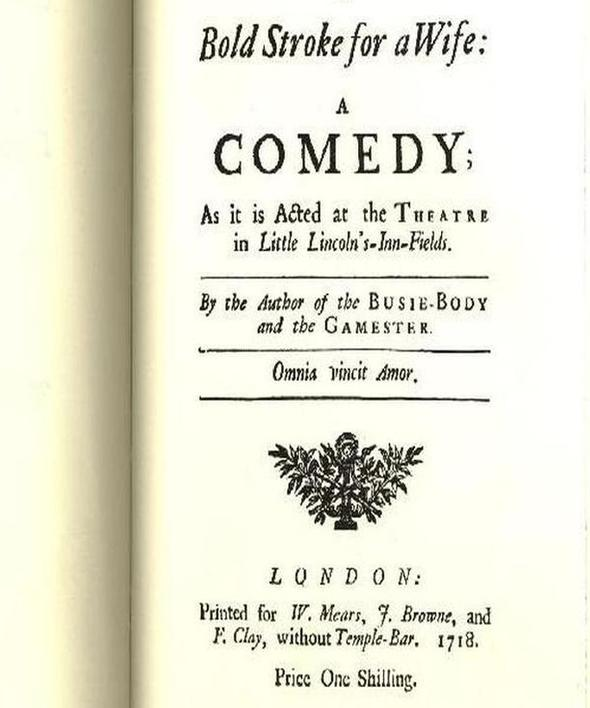
- Title page of first printing, 1718
- Original language: English
- Written by: Susanna Centlivre
- Genre: Comedy

Premiere
- Date: 3 February 1718
- Place: Lincoln's Inn Fields Theatre

A Bold Stroke for a Wife is Susanna Centlivre's 18th-century satirical English play first performed in 1718. The plot expresses the author's unabashed support of the British Whig Party: she criticises the Tories, religious hypocrisy, and avarice.

== Synopsis ==
Set in 18th-century England, the play tells the story of a military officer who wants to marry a young woman. His obstacles are the four guardians who watch over Anne Lovely. Each of the four has his own idea of the ideal husband. The catch is that each is disagreeable in his own way, and they can't possibly see eye to eye on a man for Anne.

To gain Miss Lovely's hand in marriage, soldier Colonel Fainwell must convince the four guardians that he will make an ideal husband. Fainwell takes the bold stroke of wearing elaborate disguises, four of which mimic the personalities and occupations of each of the guardians in turn: an antiquarian, an old beau, a Quaker, and an exchange broker. In all, Fainwell dons the guise of a preening fop, a mysterious world traveler, a shuffling country steward, a dimwitted Dutchman and a fire-and-brimstone preacher in turn. The fire-and-brimstone Quaker character impersonated by Fainwell is Simon Pure, and one point of the plot is to discover the "real" Simon Pure. Fainwell gets the guardians' permission to wed Lovely but before the marriage can take place, the real Simon Pure shows up at the end to prove his identity.

== Characters ==
=== Main ===
Colonel Fainwell is the protagonist in this play, going after the consent of the four guardians to receive Anne Lovely's hand in marriage. Helped by his friend Freeman, he resorts to impersonations and deceitful behaviours to gain the consent of the four guardians by transforming himself into the ideal husband each guardian seeks.
Anne Lovely is the damsel in distress held hostage by the four guardians. She seeks an exit from them and relies on Fainwell to obtain consent from her guardians to gain her freedom. She has a massive amount of money that comes with her when she marries after the guardians give consent. She changes her life style and attitude for each guardian she stays with, as she has to stay with each of the guardians for three months per year.

=== Guardians ===
- Periwinkle is described as an antique collector, his wardrobe collection is made up of clothes of fashion from the last century, and he follows the words of the author of a collection of travellers' tales Sir John Mandeville more than the words of the Bible. Deception to obtain his consent fails the first time, but is successful the second time when he is tricked into signing the consent when presented with the false lease for his uncle's estate.
- Tradelove is described as a stickler for trade, hates anything that comes with a sword, and is a great admirer of Dutch traders believing they understand trade better than any other nation. It is also noted that he is devilish in his dealings, as he cheated his father for the advantage of stock to get a bargain. He is encouraged to offer his consent to marry Anne Lovely to the Dutch trader in lieu of the payment of two thousand pounds wagered.
- Sir Philip Modelove is described as a "beau". He is an old fashioned man who dresses fancy by keeping with the new fashions, and is the cheapest of the whole company on birthdays. He admires the French and enjoys the French operas, balls, and masquerades. Approving Colonel Fainwell's French behaviours and high class appearance, he gives his consent and introduces Fainwell to the rest of the guardians.
- Obadiah Prim is a very rigid Quaker. At the start of the play Anne Lovely is seen entering Prim's house to start her three-month stay with him. He believes those who are not Quakers are impure. He is deceived by Colonel Fainwell when he impersonates Simon Pure and gives his consent when he is convinced Colonel Fainwell had converted Lovely.

=== Other ===
Mrs. Prim, Obadiah's wife, berates Anne Lovely for not being a Quaker and for her appearance and choices in clothes.
Betty is Anne Lovely's maid and only friend.
Simon Pure is a Quaker preacher from Pennsylvania who comes to visit Obadiah Prim. His visit creates an entrance for Colonel Fainwell and is impersonated by him.
Freeman is Colonel Fainwell's friend, dedicated to helping Fainwell achieve his goals with Anne Lovely. He initially introduces Fainwell to his difficult task and directly helps obtain consent from Tradelove by the levering a wager the merchant has lost. Freeman also keeps an eye out for Colonel Fainwell during his impersonation of Simon Pure and sends in a false letter to help.
Sackbut is the tavern keeper. He describes each guardian to Colonel Fainwell and also helps Fainwell with his goal of obtaining consent from them.

== Summary ==
=== Act 1 ===
The act starts with Colonel Fainwell and Freeman at the local tavern as Colonel Fainwell is talking of love. He has seen Anne Lovely earlier in the day and inquires about her of his friend Freeman, who calls upon the Tavern owner Sackbut to tell Fainwell about the four guardians who were left with the care of Lovely and her fortune. It is revealed that her father wished Lovely dead a thousand times because he wished the world would end on his passing. Since fortune was to be passed down to Lovely, the father arranged it so that in order for Lovely to marry, she had to get the consent of all four guardians. Each of the guardians had their own view of the ideal husband in ways that contradicted each other making it impossible for a universal agreement among the four men. Lovely spends three months of each year at each of the guardians' residences. Her three months with Prim begins as the action opens. With promises of help from Freeman and Sackbut, Fainwell plans on obtaining the consent of the guardians, beginning with Sir Philip Modelove.

During Fainwell's meeting with his friends, Lovely and her assistant Betty discuss Lovely's situation with the guardians. Lovely is sick and tired of being subjected to the "preposterous humours" of people in town and being pointed at. Lovely brings up that Colonel Fainwell had promised her freedom from her situation and mentions that she likes the Colonel above all the men she has ever seen.

==== Key points ====
Fainwell's method of obtaining consent is to assume the identity of the ideal gentleman to each guardian. Since he has no chance in obtaining consent as himself from all four guardians simultaneously, he is forced to get consent individually. The Colonel only needs to deceive each guardian long enough to receive consent to marry Anne Lovely while disguised as the guardian's ideal husband.

=== Act 2 ===
Colonel Fainwell shows up at the park dressed nicely to impress Sir Philip with a few footmen to show off. Fainwell is supposedly dressed in a French style which attracts the attention of Sir Philip as Colonel approaches him. Once they begin to "praise one another", the woman sitting with Sir Philip leaves and the Colonel says everything that Sir Philip wants to hear. Sir Philip gives his consent and they arrange for Fainwell to be introduced personally to the other three guardians.

At Obadiah Prim's house, Mrs. Prim and Anne Lovely argue about Lovely's choice of dress, Mrs. Prim saying it is too revealing. Lovely argues back saying Mrs. Prim is a prude and a believer of Quaker to Quaker relations. Mr. Prim enters and states that Lovely's breasts are too exposed and that she should hide them with a handkerchief, also stating that it inflames desire in other men. Lovely is upset and declares that her father never meant the tyranny of guardianship to control her life, while Mr. Prim defends himself by stating that all he meant was to prevent her from wearing temping attire and provoking others to sin.

Sir Philip and Fainwell arrive at Prim's house and Fainwell is introduced to Mr. Prim formally for the first time. Then he is introduced to Lovely and as he goes to kiss her hand, he attempts to give her a letter which she drops and Prim picks up. After Fainwell reveals to Lovely who he really is, Lovely realizes she had made a mistake refusing his letter. She snatches the letter away from Prim and shreds it before anyone can take it back from her. The other guardians arrive and Fainwell is introduced to Periwinkle and Tradelove. Both guardians question Colonel Fainwell, determine that they disapprove of Sir Philip's suggestion, and leave declaring their requirement that all of their personal qualifications be met.

==== Key Points ====
We see in this act that Sir Philip is a fop. He has very big interests in Fashion and is made to believe the Colonel is a higher figure than he really is. The Colonel plays every card he knows to mirror Sir Philip's personality to make them seem to "...appear to have but one soul, for our ideas and conceptions are the same."(Act 2, Scene 1, 83–85). In the next scene, we see how Lovely rejects Quaker strictures and notions of 'modesty.' Mr. and Mrs. Prim's characteristics are revealed even more when the point about romance between Quakers is accepted even with temptation being involved, but if they are not Quakers, it is evil and is looked down upon. It is reconfirmed that the disapproval of the other guardians is unanimous, as each fails to see the Colonel as one of his own kind.

=== Act 3 ===
Act three starts with Sackbut congratulating Colonel Fainwell for obtaining the consent of at least one of the guardians. The Colonel is in an Egyptian dress, disguised as a foreigner, to meet Periwinkle. Periwinkle is intrigued by not only the foreign appearance of Fainwell, but also the antique "habits" the Colonel displays. Periwinkle asks Fainwell if he has collected any rarities, as odd trinkets capture his interest, even asking if he's had a crocodile. Fainwell plays it off saying that he possesses more worthy knowledge than would be shown by possession of such petite items. He claims that he has great knowledge of the sun, more than what Descartes has claimed to discover and find out. With Periwinkle astonished and jealous, Fainwell lists a slew of items with claims of outrageous things they can do. He finishes off the list with a typical girdle claiming it has the power to make the wearer invisible and able to teleport instantaneously. Fainwell explains that in order for the girdle to work, the others in the room must face east. After the explanation Periwinkle tries on the girdle, Fainwell and Sackbut turn towards the east, and when they turn back, they pretend that Periwinkle disappeared. Not convinced, Periwinkle requests that the Colonel try the girdle on. Fainwell agrees and when Periwinkle and Sackbut turn east, Fainwell hides underneath a trap door so that when Periwinkle turns back, the illusion of invisibility is played out.

After the demonstration, Sackbut raises a point saying that if Periwinkle would purchase the girdle and use it, he would be able to travel as he always wanted to. The Colonel says that the girdle would never change ownership for money and reveals that the point of his trip is to find the guardians of Lovely and win their consent in his marriage suit. The first guardian to give consent would receive the girdle, and Periwinkle declares that he is one of the four guardians of Lovely. Right when the agreement is to be signed and finalized, a drawer of the tailor reveals to Periwinkle that the foreigner is actually Colonel Fainwell, ruining Fainwell's plans. Fainwell flees immediately and Freeman enters to set forth the backup plan. Freeman informs Periwinkle that his uncle is dying and suggests that he make a trip to the estate despite it being far away. Periwinkle thanks Freeman, leaves, and the Colonel and Sackbut re-enter with the plan of going after the next guardian, Tradelove.

==== Key Points ====
Fainwell is dressed up as a foreigner armed with a "unique" item that is so intriguing to Periwinkle, Fainwell could demand anything and would likely receive it. Strangely enough, the item Fainwell uses is called "moros musphonon", meaning mousetrap for a fool in Greek. Periwinkle is indeed a fool and is easily manipulated into believing the girdle's abilities. He is also a fool for easily believing the disguised Fainwell was the nephew of his admirer John Tradescant.

=== Act 4 ===
Act four opens at the Exchange Alley where all the stock action takes place with Tradelove looking busy. Freeman enters with Fainwell disguised as a Dutch trader with news saying the Spanish had raised their siege of Cagliari. The note states that no one would know right now, but in a few hours it will go public and this would be the perfect opportunity to make money. Tradelove and Freeman both make transactions that they think will bear fruit, and Freeman mentions to Tradelove that the Colonel has no idea of the potential opportunity present. Tradelove insists that the siege has been raised while Fainwell holds his end maintaining that it has not. Result: Tradelove lays down a money bet.

With the bet made, Fainwell and Freeman make it back to Sackbut's Tavern to plan for Periwinkle's opening with his dying uncle. Before they get started, Sackbut enters with a letter addressed to Prim, introducing him to Simon Pure, a Quaker leader. Fainwell plans on impersonating this Simon Pure to try to secure consent from Mr. Prim. Sackbut prepares Quaker clothes and also provides the country dress Fainwell is to wear as the steward of Periwinkle's uncle.

Tradelove shows up at the tavern seeking Freeman's audience. Fainwell disguised as the steward sneaks out, Freeman meets with Tradelove who immediately brings up that the letter Freeman received earlier was a fake. Tradelove loses the bet he made with Fainwell at the exchange and is unable to pay it. Freeman suggests that Tradelove offer his consent to marry off Anne Lovely without mentioning to the Colonel that he would still require the consent of the other three guardians. Tradelove agrees to this proposal and tells Freeman to ask the "Dutch Trader" to accept this proposal in satisfaction of the two thousand pounds wagered.

The scene shifts to the Colonel disguised as the steward at Periwinkle's house informing him of his uncle's death. Fainwell now as "Pillage" sobs in between lines to make it seem like the uncle's death greatly impacts his life. Fainwell brings up the contents of the uncle's will, and lastly mentioning "his" lease needs to be renewed with the approval of Periwinkle. Periwinkle approves, and as he inspects the pen Fainwell hands him, Fainwell switches the lease for the consent contract and Periwinkle signs the consent form unknowingly.

With the form in hand, Fainwell leaves Periwinkle's house and returns to the tavern where Freeman and Tradelove are waiting. Before the Colonel has a chance to make an appearance, Tradelove praises the generosity of the Dutch trader for accepting the proposal of his consent for marriage in lieu of the two thousand pound payment. The Colonel, now dressed as the Dutch trader, enters and secures the deal for consent, with Sackbut and Freeman as witnesses of the signing. Tradelove leaves, claiming he will put in a good word with the other guardians as he made the Dutch trader believe he was the main man in charge of Anne Lovely's marriage affairs. On Tradelove's way out, he is smiling, thinking that he has bested the Dutch Trader, gaining relief for his debt at the small price of his consent for a still impossible marriage.

==== Key Points ====
Tradelove is seen to admire Dutch traders, claiming they know stocks and trade best of all nations, and yet he makes a wager with confidence against the Colonel based on the letter Freeman shows him. He shows his cocky behaviour, hoping to finally outwit a Dutch trader, and his trust in Freeman by accepting the information in the letter. After Tradelove finds out about his ruin, he offers consent for the trader to marry Lovely in lieu of his payment. He emphasizes that he is the leader of all the guardians in charge of Lovely's marriage plans, saying that he would not give up the consent easily. The deceit is played out and accepted by the Colonel, making Tradelove feel like a winner when in reality he is the loser.

At Periwinkle's house, all goes according to plan; Fainwell acts as if the death was a true tragedy to help prove that the circumstances are genuine. He brings up the lease signing to get a signature one way or another, switching it with the consent contract to secure Anne Lovely from Periwinkle's end.

The arrival of Simon Pure's letter was not originally in the plans and represents a godsend for Fainwell, an opportunity to win Prim's consent to marry Anne Lovely.

=== Act 5 ===
The act starts at Prim's house with Mrs. Prim and Anne Lovely arguing over Lovely's choice in dress. Lovely declares that she wishes to dress in whatever fashion she desires and claims that Mrs. Prim would have never attracted any man with the way she dresses. Mrs. Prim counters that she did indeed attract many men while properly dressed. Loveley, she says, is too familiar with wicked people. The guardians all enter and all claim that they have found a husband for Lovely. As each speaks, a different guardian shoots the candidate down, despite, unbeknownst to them, each candidate being the same person. Prim is the only one without a candidate to marry Lovely, which changes quickly when a servant announces that Simon Pure, the Colonel in disguise, has arrived.

The Colonel enters in a Quaker's outfit as Lovely and Mrs. Prim re-enter to greet the "guest". As Lovely enters, Fainwell cannot help but stare at her. Prim notices this and asks why Fainwell stares, to which he responds that he had a dream and saw Lovely in it. Prim interprets this as Lovely being converted and leaves with Mrs. Prim to have Fainwell convert Lovely so she will become a faithful Quaker. Lovely does not recognize Fainwell in his Quaker disguise and shrieks when he approaches her initially. Fainwell reveals his identity to calm her down. Due to the shriek, Prim investigates, but Lovely explains she shrieked because of Fainwell's non-stop blabber about converting her into a Quaker. Convinced, Prim exits once again to leave Fainwell and Lovely alone. Fainwell explains to Lovely that he has the consent of the other three guardians and only needs Prim's to marry her. Lovely plays along with Fainwell, faking that she has indeed converted to a Quaker. Prim is convinced that Lovely is converted. Then a servant enters and informs Prim that the real Simon Pure has arrived.

Once Simon Pure has arrived, Fainwell's deception holds because a counterfeit letter is brought in, stating that there would be an imposter dressed as a Quaker with a mob to rob and kill Prim. Fainwell accuses Simon of being the imposter and Lovely adds on saying that she saw Simon with said mob, convincing Prim to dismiss the real Simon Pure. Fainwell realizes his time under cover is short, so he acts quickly and explains that Lovely would not be left alone by the Sathan and Lovely displays attitudes as if the spirits have filled her. Convinced, Prim gives his consent for Fainwell to marry Lovely and signs the papers, only for Simon to return with proof of his identity. Since Fainwell has obtained the consent, he no longer has any reason to deceive anyone anymore and admits that he was the false Simon Pure. All the guardians enter with Freeman and realize that they have all been deceived as Fainwell exposes his many identities to them.

==== Key Points ====
Fainwell's disguise as a Quaker admits him to the household of Prim and wins acceptance from him and his wife. After Lovely discovers his disguise, her acting helps persuade Prim that she has been converted, hence the speedy consent approval.

The counterfeit letter that mentions an imposter could have gone both ways. With Fainwell's aggression and Lovely's assistance, Simon is forced to leave, and he is gone long enough for Fainwell to obtain the consent form from Prim. The letter had not been pre-planned, but the Colonel recognizes Freeman's handwriting, and his handywork. Freeman has kept watch, on the look-out for the arrival of the real Simon Pure.

== Analysis ==
Centlivre made fun of all the stereotypes of her time, fearlessly sending up the marriage mart, fashion, commerce, academia and even religion.

== History ==
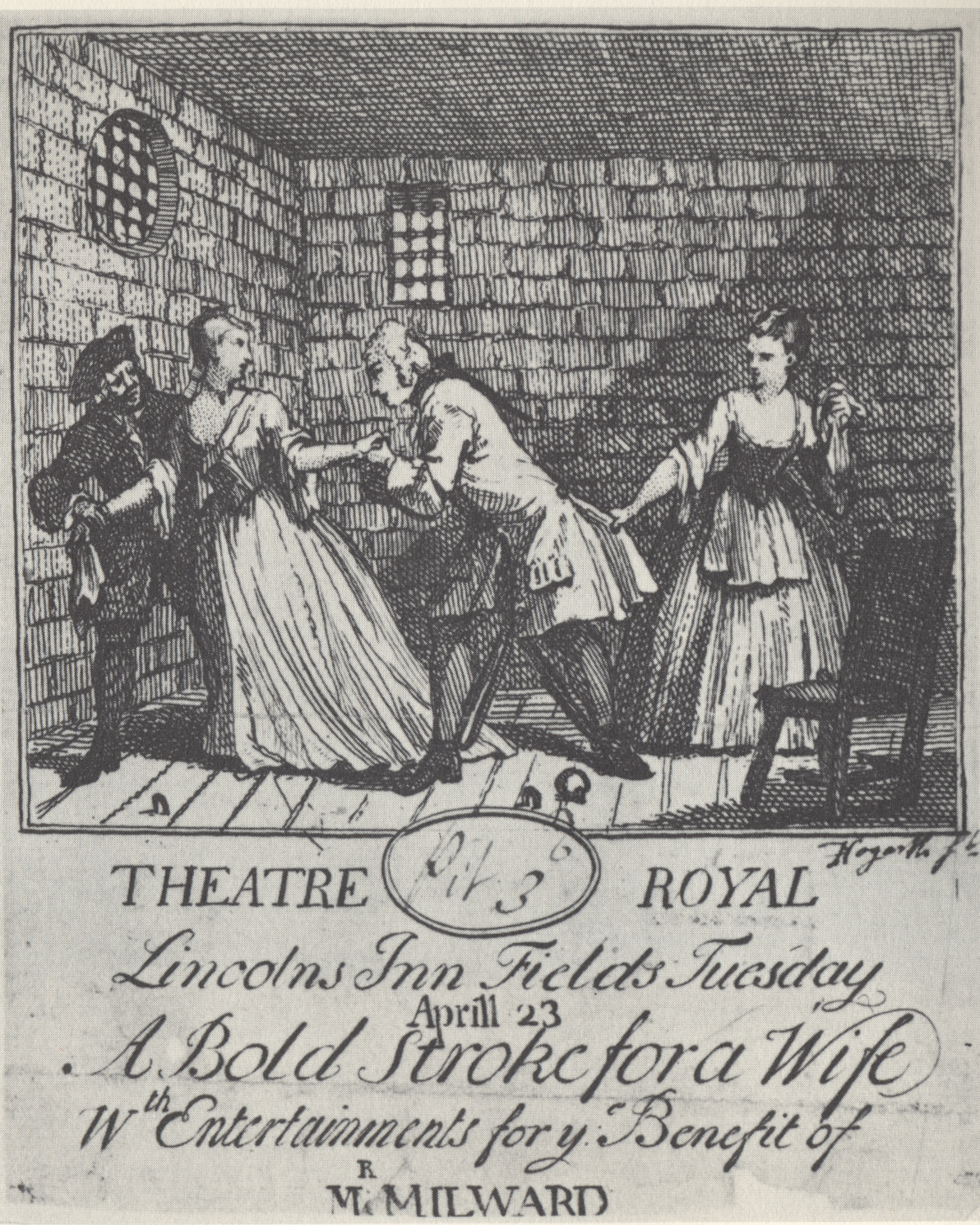
William Hogarth's ticket to the play

A Bold Stroke for a Wife was first performed at the Lincoln's Inn Fields Theatre, on 3 February 1718, where it ran six nights, which was considered a substantial success. The original cast included James Spiller as Periwinkle, William Bullock as Tradelove, George Pack as Obadiah, Christopher Bullock as Colonel Fainwell, John Ogden as Freeman, Jane Rogers as Mrs Lovely and Mary Kent as Mrs Prim.

During its long life the play became very popular in the United States. It was produced as early as 1782 (in Baltimore). In 1786 a Charleston, South Carolina, journalist commented that "The Bold Stroke for a Wife . . . is one of the few comedies that has stood the test of time -- it is full of business and intrigue and abounds with such a variety as always arrests and keeps up the attention of the audience until it ends." The play continued to find American audiences into the nineteenth century, and was billed as a "fine old comedy" when it was presented at Wallack's Theatre on Broadway in 1863.

In 1960, this play was adapted as the film 'Ek Phool Chaar Kaante' (A Rose and Four Thorns) starring Sunil Dutt and Waheeda Rehman. The four guardians were portrayed by the then four most famous character actors of contemporary Bollywood- David, Dhumal, Rashid Khan and Johnny Walker. In a 1985 production by Double Edge Theatre the play was set in the deviant androgynous cabaret world of the 1920s as an ironic look at "the marriage game" written by an 18th-century male impersonator to underscore its cross-gender casting and the wry implications such an approach has in contemporary society.

== Contribution to language ==
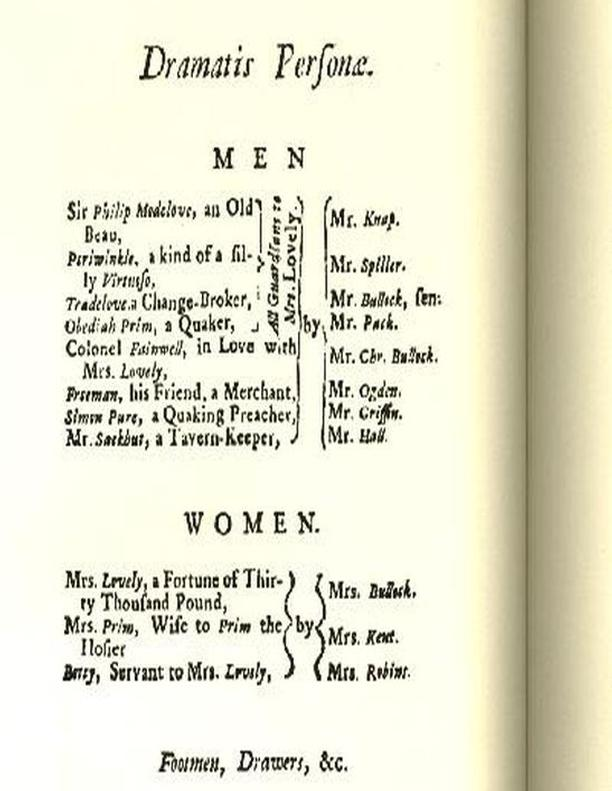
Cast list from first printing, 1718

=== Simon Pure ===
Like the character of Mrs. Malaprop in Sheridan's play The Rivals, the name Simon Pure soon became a noun for a quality in a person. In Mrs. Malaprop's case, that quality was incorrect usage of a word by substituting a similar-sounding word with different meaning, usually with comic effect. In Simon's case, that quality was authenticity and in Simon's impersonator's case, that quality was hypocrisy.

In adjectival use, the compound quickly gained a hyphen and lost its capitals when, in 1894, William Dean Howells wrote glowingly of "American individuality, the real, simon-pure article." As in boycott from Captain Boycott and bloomer from Amelia Bloomer, names turn into words and lose their capital letters in eponymy. As a noun, Simon Pure is two words; as an adjective, it is lowercase and still holds the hyphen. That keeps the adjectival form untainted.

The fact that there were two Simon Pures on stage is probably the reason the term became a confusing one. Depending on how it's used, it can mean either an honest man or a hypocrite who makes a great show of virtue.

In modern usage, Simon Pure has become the source of two expressions: the phrase "The real Simon Pure", meaning "the real man"; and the adjective "simon-pure", meaning either

1. of genuine, untainted purity or integrity; or
2. pretentiously, superficially or hypocritically virtuous.

In 1984, the term "simon-pure" received some publicity when Ambassador Robert Morris at the United States State Department conceded that the United States had taken some steps toward economic protectionism, but insisted, "If we are not simon-pure, we remain fairly credible." As reported by then-The New York Times columnist William Safire, the phrase simon-pure means "untainted". In this context, delegates to conventions who are unencumbered by charges of being the creatures of ill-gotten funds are simon-pure delegates.
