= The Double Gallant =

1707 play

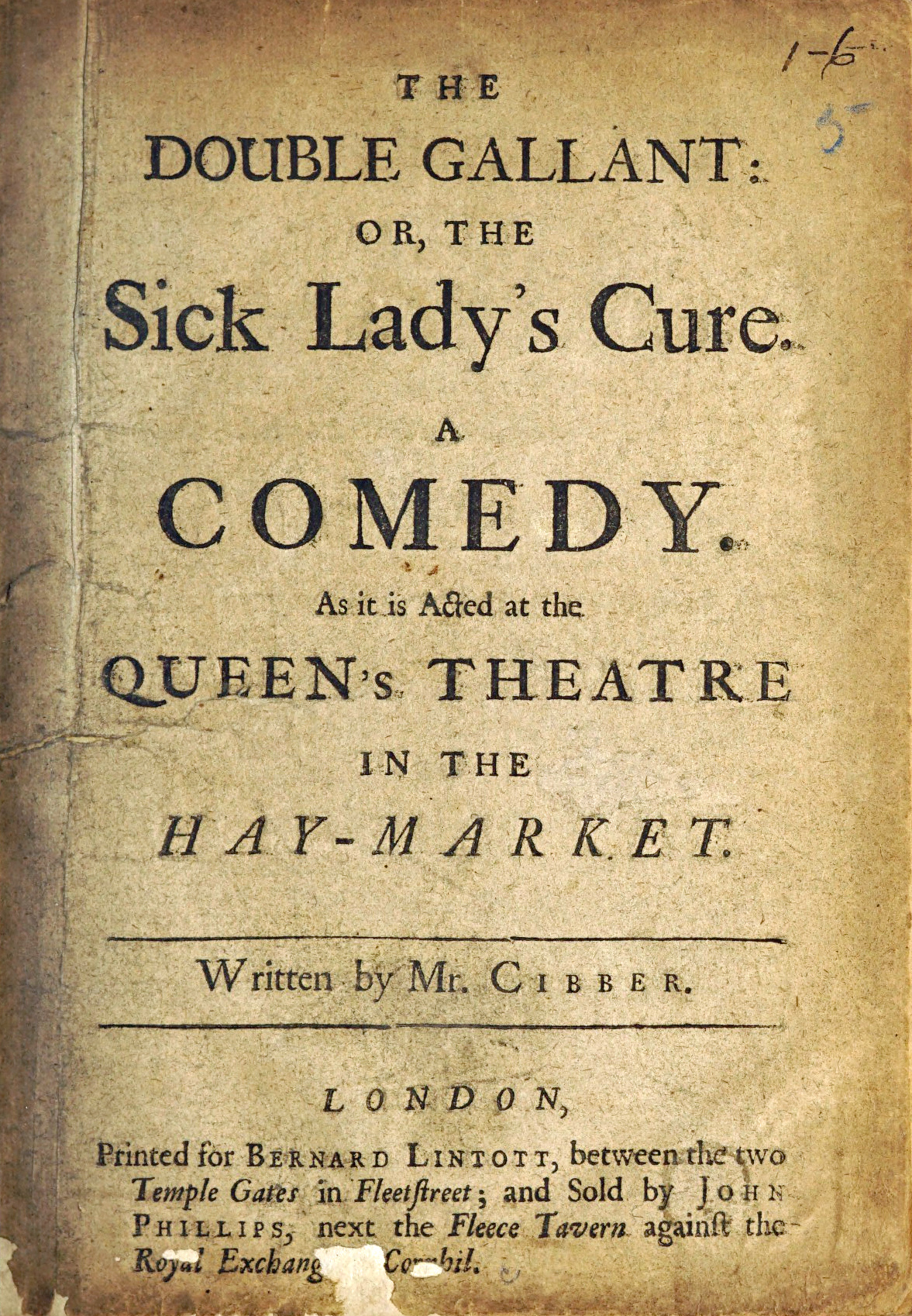
- Title page of the first edition of 1707
- Original language: English
- Written by: Colley Cibber
- Genre: Comedy

Premiere
- Date: 1 November 1707
- Place: Queen's Theatre, Haymarket

The Double Gallant, or the Sick Lady's Cure is a 1707 comedy play by the British writer Colley Cibber.

It was originally performed on 1 November 1707 at the Queen's Theatre in the Haymarket with a cast that included Benjamin Johnson as Sir Solomon, Barton Booth as Clerimont, Robert Wilks as Careless, Colley Cibber as Atall, William Bowen as Captain Strut, Henry Norris as Sir Squabble Splithair, George Pack as Saunter, William Bullock as Old Wilful, Richard Cross as Sir Harry Atall, Anne Oldfield as Lady Dainty, Letitia Cross as Lady Sadlife, Jane Rogers as Clarinda, Lucretia Bradshaw as Sylvia and Margaret Saunders as Wishwell.

== Adaptation ==
The play was adapted for radio by Raymond Raikes and broadcast on the BBC Third Programme in October 1962. Timothy West was Atoll and Fenella Fielding was Lady Dainty, and music was composed by Christopher Whelen. This version was rebroadcast in 2024 on BBC Radio 4 Extra.

== Bibliography ==
- Burling, William J. A Checklist of New Plays and Entertainments on the London Stage, 1700-1737. Fairleigh Dickinson Univ Press, 1992.
- McGirr, Elaine M. Partial Histories: A Reappraisal of Colley Cibber. Springer, 2016.
- Nicoll, Allardyce. History of English Drama, 1660-1900, Volume 2. Cambridge University Press, 2009.
- Van Lennep, W. The London Stage, 1660-1800: Volume Two, 1700-1729. Southern Illinois University Press, 1960.
