= The Twin Rivals =

- Original language: English
- Written by: George Farquhar
- Genre: Comedy

Premiere
- Date: 14 December 1702
- Place: Drury Lane Theatre

The Twin Rivals is a 1702 comedy play by the Irish writer George Farquhar. It was one of the author's least successful plays. A younger son schemes to cheat his elder brother out of the family estate.

The original Drury Lane cast featured Robert Wilks as Elder Woudbee, Colley Cibber as younger Woudbee, Benjamin Husband as Richemore, John Mills as Trueman, William Pinkethman as Subtleman, Benjamin Johnson as Balderdash, William Bowen as Teague, Jane Rogers as Constance, Mary Hook as Aurelia, William Bullock as Mandrake and Henrietta Moore as Steward's wife. The prologue was written by Peter Anthony Motteux.

In 1981 it was revived by the Royal Shakespeare Company.

== Bibliography ==
- Donald F. Bond & G. Sherburn. The Literary History of England: Vol 3: The Restoration and Eighteenth Century (1660-1789). Routledge, 2003.
