= She Would and She Would Not =

Comedy by Colley Cibber

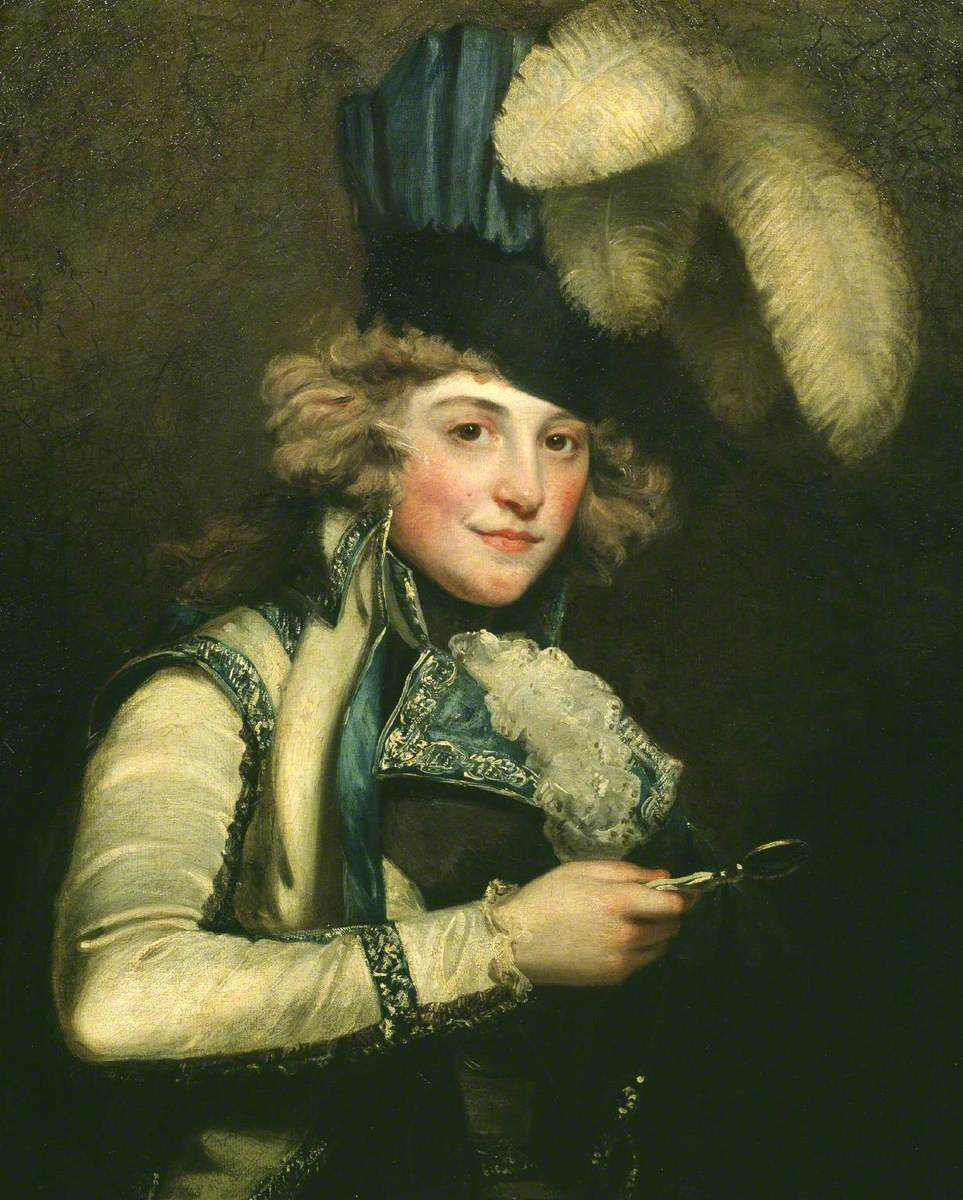
- Dorothea Jordan as Hypolita by John Hoppner, 1791.
- Original language: English
- Written by: Colley Cibber
- Genre: Comedy

Premiere
- Date: 26 November 1702
- Place: Theatre Royal, Drury Lane, London

She Would and She Would Not is a 1702 comedy play by the English actor-writer Colley Cibber.

The original Drury Lane cast included Cibber as Don Manuel, Benjamin Husband as Don Philip, John Mills as Octavio, William Pinkethman as Trappanti, William Bullock as Soto, Susanna Verbruggen as Hypolita, Mary Hook as Rosara, Henrietta Moore as Flora and Frances Maria Knight as Viletta. Incidental music was composed by Jacques Paisible. Cibber dedicated the play to the Duke of Ormonde, attributing the play's success to the delirious public mood following the recent victory at Vigo.

The play was revived frequently. In 1800 during a performance at Drury Lane James Hadfield attempted to assassinate George III.

== Bibliography ==
- Burling, William J. A Checklist of New Plays and Entertainments on the London Stage, 1700-1737. Fairleigh Dickinson Univ Press, 1992.
