= Jane Wiseman =

British actress, poet, & playwright (1673–c.1717)

Jane Holt (née Wiseman; March 1673 – after 1717) was a British poet and playwright, notable for being the first self-educated labouring-class woman to have a play professionally produced in London.

Wiseman was possibly born in Holborn. She seems to have been from a modest labouring-class background and self-taught and she worked as a servant, but very little else is known about her. Her one play, Antiochus the Great, or, The Fatal Relapse, was successfully produced at the New Theatre, Lincoln's Inn Fields, in 1701, and revived as late as 1721. It was one of forty or so plays by women produced in London between 1695 and 1723, and is notable for its emphasis on female friendship. She was part of a literary group with Susannah Centlivre, with whom she was friends, as well as George Farquhar, Abel Boyer, Ned Ward, and Tom Brown.

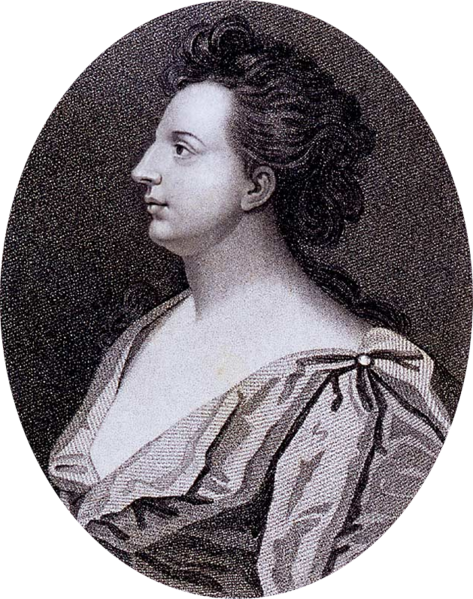
Tragedienne Elizabeth Barry played Leodice in Wiseman's Antiochus the Great

She is thought to have been the "Mrs Holt" whose collection of occasional and friendship poems, A Fairy Tale Inscrib'd, to the Honourable Mrs. W—, with other Poems, was published in 1717.

Wiseman took the proceeds from her success with Antiochus the Great and bought a tavern in Westminster for herself and her husband.

== Etexts ==
- Wiseman, Jane. Antiochus the Great, or, The Fatal Relapse (1701). Rpt. in Love and thunder: plays by women in the age of Queen Anne Ed. and Intro. Kendall. London: Methuen, 1988, pp. 113–153. (Free with registration at the Internet Archive)

== See also ==
- 1701 in literature
- 1717 in poetry
- List of 18th-century British working-class writers
