= The Fair Quaker of Deal =

- Original language: English
- Written by: Charles Shadwell
- Genre: Comedy

Premiere
- Date: 25 February 1710
- Place: Theatre Royal, Drury Lane

The Fair Quaker of Deal or, The Humours of the Navy is a 1710 comedy play by the British writer Charles Shadwell. A popular hit running for thirteen nights, it was revived a number of times.

The original Drury Lane cast included Barton Booth as Worthy, George Pack as Mizen, George Powell as Rovewell, Thomas Elrington as Cribidge, John Corey as Easy, John Freeman as Scruple, Hester Santlow as Dorcas Zeal, Henrietta Moore as Belinda and Lucretia Bradshaw as Arabella Zeal.

The play was dedicated to "my generous and obliging friends of the County of Kent".

== List of Characters ==
- Flip - The Commodore, illiterate tar, hates the Gentlemen of the Navy, gets drunk with his Boats-Crew, and values himself upon the brutish Management of the Navy.
- Mizen - a cynical Sea-Fop, a mighty reformer of the Navy, keeps a visiting day and is Flip's opposite.
- Worthy - a Captain of the Navy, a gentleman of honour, sense and reputation.
- Rovewell - a gentleman of fortune, and true lover of the Officers of the Navy.
- Sir Charles Pleasant - Worthy's Lieutenant, a man of quality.
- Cribidge - Flip's lieutenant, a brisk young fellow.
- Easy - a Lieutenant of Marines
- Indent - Flip's purser
- Scruple - a Corporation Justice, a canting hypocrite
- Mr Norris - coxswain.
- Arabella Zeal - bred a Churchwoman
- Dorcas Zeal - bred a Quaker
- Belinda - a woman of fortune.
- Penny Private - whore of the town
- Jiltup - whore of the town
- Maid to Arabella
- Barmaid

== Bibliography ==
- Burling, William J. A Checklist of New Plays and Entertainments on the London Stage, 1700-1737. Fairleigh Dickinson Univ Press, 1992.
- Nicoll, Allardyce. A History of Early Eighteenth Century Drama: 1700-1750. CUP Archive, 1927.
