= The Revolution of Sweden =

18th century drama

- Original language: English
- Written by: Catharine Cockburn
- Genre: Tragedy

Premiere
- Date: 11 February 1706
- Place: Queen's Theatre, Haymarket, London

The Revolution of Sweden is a 1706 tragedy by the British writer Catharine Cockburn.

The original Haymarket cast included Barton Booth as Gustavus, Thomas Betterton as Arwide, John Corey as Erici, Benjamin Husband as Viceroy, John Bowman as Archbishop and Elizabeth Barry as Constanta.

== Bibliography ==
- Burling, William J. A Checklist of New Plays and Entertainments on the London Stage, 1700-1737. Fairleigh Dickinson Univ Press, 1992.
- Nicoll, Allardyce. History of English Drama, 1660-1900, Volume 2. Cambridge University Press, 2009.
