= Louise de Bossigny =

Louise de Bossigny comtesse d'Auneuil
- Died: 10 January 1700
- Citizenship: French
- Occupation: Author
- Writing career
- Pen name: Madame la comtesse D. L.
- Language: French
- Genre: Fairy tale
- Notable work: La Tiranie des fées détruite (The Tyranny of the Fairies Destroyed)

Louise de Bossigny, comtesse d'Auneuil, (? – 10 January 1700) was a French salonnière and author of fairy tales.

== Life ==
She married the Comte d'Auneuil and established her standing in Paris and at court with a salon that was "open to all the beaux esprits and to all the women who wrote." Her fairy tale collection, La Tiranie des fées détruite (The Tyranny of the Fairies Destroyed), playfully alludes to the pre-existing genre of fairy tales popular in her time. Her final work, Les Chevaliers errans et le genie familier (The Knights Errant and the Familiar Genie), is divided into two sections, the first evoking chivalric romances and the second presenting a brief sequence of tales purportedly translated from Arabic.

== Works ==
- La Tiranie des fées détruite (1702)
- L'Origine des cornes, ou l'Inconstance punie (1702)
- La Princesse des Pretintailles (1702)
- L'Origine du lansquenet (1703)
- Les Chevaliers errans et le genie familier (1709)
