= Laurent Bordelon =

L'abbé Laurent Bordelon
- Born: Bourges, France
- Died: 6 April 1730; Paris, France
- Citizenship: French
- Occupations: Theologian and author
- Writing career
- Language: French
- Genre: Satire
- Notable work: L'histoire des imaginations extravagantes de monsieur Oufle (A history of the ridiculous extravagancies of Monsieur Oufle)

Laurent Bordelon (1653 in Bourges – 6 April 1730 in Paris), was a 17th/18th-century French abbot, doctor in theology, playwright, polygraph and progressive utopian. He wrote "a hundred hasty volumes or compilations on all subjects."

== Works ==
=== Satirical fantasies ===
In Mital; ou Aventures incroyables (1708), Bordelon satirizes unreliable works of science and history. The title character travels widely and discovers places where "fishes live on land, chickens wear hair instead of feathers, men possess four eyes, and women wear beards ... men do not walk, but glide on their bellies like serpents ... children are never weaned from their nurses" and so on, among hundreds of other unusual phenomena. An extensive collection of end notes details the source material in which similar observations had been presented as non-fiction.

In L'histoire des imaginations extravagantes de monsieur Oufle (A history of the ridiculous extravagancies of Monsieur Oufle), originally published in 1710, Bordelon satirizes the occult. As a consequence of reading too many works on "Magick, the Black-Art, Daemoniacks, Conjurers, Witches," etc., the title character deludedly believes that he is a werewolf, that his birth date suggests he will be successful at romance, that others around him are demons, and so on. Much as in Mital, annotations reveal the original sources in which similarly fanciful material had been presented as non-fiction.

In Gomgam, ou l'Homme prodigieux transporté dans l'air, sur la terre et sous les eaux (1711), Bordelon satirizes vacuous pedantry and learning only from books. The title character attends college, reads encyclopedias, and expounds on topics he believes he understands. But an old man takes Gomgam on a magical journey to see a rainbow up close, the Red Sea from above, and the ocean from below, in each case dispelling his misconceptions and showing him the truth.

=== Selected publications ===
- 1689: Entretiens curieux sur l'astrologie judiciaire, Paris, (quite famous attack against astrology, particularly against Nostradamus.)
- 1692: Arlequin comédien aux Champs-Élysées, comedy
- 1694: Molière comédien aux Champs-Élysées, comedy
- 1709: L'esprit de Guy Patin (Guy Patin (1601–1672), homme de lettres and physician.)
- 1712: Les coudées franches — online : first part
- 1724: Nouveautés dédiées à gens de différent états, depuis la charrue jusqu'au sceptre, 2 vol., Paris, (Book mocking all social classes of the early eighteenth and playing defects of each. The caustic style did not go unnoticed.)
- 1736: Entretiens des cheminées de Paris, La Haye, Pierre de Hondt

== Bibliography ==
- « Les facéties de l’Abbé Laurent Bordelon », sur bibliomab.wordpress.com (text dated 2 October 2011, accessdate 3 April 2015)
- Adrien-Jean-Quentin Beuchot, « Bordelon (Laurent) », dans Louis-Gabriel Michaud, Biographie universelle, vol.5, 1812, p. 159
- Gérard-Gailly, « Bordelon (abbé Laurent) », in Dictionnaire des lettres françaises, XVIIe, Fayard, éd. de 1996, La Pochothèque, p. 171 (with bibliography)
- Jacqueline de La Harpe, L'abbé Laurent Bordelon et la lutte contre la superstition en France entre 1680 et 1730, University of California Publications in Modern Philology vol. 26, n°2, Berkeley, Los Angeles, Univ. of California Press, 1942 (with a seven-page list of books)
