= Antiochus the Great (play) =

Play by Jane Wiseman

- Original language: English
- Written by: Jane Wiseman
- Genre: Tragedy

Premiere
- Date: November 1701
- Place: Lincoln's Inn Fields Theatre

Antiochus the Great is a 1701 tragedy by the English writer Jane Wiseman. It is also known by the longer title of Antiochus the Great, or, The Fatal Relapse. It is based on the life of Antiochus the Great, the Greek ruler of Ancient Syria.

The original Lincoln's Inn Fields cast included George Powell as Antiochus the Great, John Bowman as Artenor, John Corey as Seleuchus, Barton Booth as Ormandes, George Pack as Philotas, Elizabeth Barry as Leodice, Elizabeth Bowman as Berenice, and Mary Porter as Child.

== Bibliography ==
- Burling, William J. A Checklist of New Plays and Entertainments on the London Stage, 1700-1737. Fairleigh Dickinson Univ Press, 1992.
- Nicoll, Allardyce. History of English Drama, 1660-1900, Volume 2. Cambridge University Press, 2009.
