= The Beau's Duel =

Play by Susanna Centlivre

- Original language: English
- Written by: Susanna Centlivre
- Genre: Comedy

Premiere
- Date: June 1702
- Place: Lincoln's Inn Fields Theatre, London

The Beau's Duel; or, A Soldier for the Ladies is a 1702 comedy play by the English writer Susanna Centlivre.

The original Lincoln's Inn Fields cast included John Corey as Colonel Manly, Barton Booth as Bellmein, George Powell as Toper, John Bowman as Mode, George Pack as Ogle, William Fieldhouse as Careful, Mary Porter as Emilia and Elinor Leigh as Mrs Plotwell.

== Sources ==
Centlivre borrowed plot elements and speeches extensively from Jasper Mayne's plays The City Match (1639) and The Amorous War (c. 1648) for The Beau's Duel. However, even in cases where the text is copied verbatim, changes in context — for example, changing the speaker from a noble to a sergeant — show that Centlivre was adapting the material to her own purposes and the tastes of her time.

== Bibliography ==
- Burling, William J. A Checklist of New Plays and Entertainments on the London Stage, 1700-1737. Fairleigh Dickinson Univ Press, 1992.
