= The Stolen Heiress =

- Original language: English
- Written by: Susanna Centlivre
- Genre: Comedy

Premiere
- Date: 31 December 1702
- Place: Lincoln's Inn Fields Theatre, London

The Stolen Heiress or, The Salamanca Doctor Outplotted is a 1702 comedy play by the English writer Susanna Centlivre.

The original Lincoln's Inn cast included John Bowman as Governour, Thomas Griffith as Count Pirro, John Freeman as Gravello, William Fieldhouse as Larich, George Powell as Palante, Barton Booth as Eugenio, George Pack as Francisco, Thomas Dogget as Sancho, George Bright as Rosco and Elizabeth Barry as Lucasia.

== Bibliography ==
- Burling, William J. A Checklist of New Plays and Entertainments on the London Stage, 1700-1737. Fairleigh Dickinson Univ Press, 1992.
