= The Double Distress =

Play by Mary Pix

- Original language: English
- Written by: Mary Pix
- Genre: Tragedy

Premiere
- Date: March 1701
- Place: Lincoln's Inn Fields Theatre

The Double Distress: A Tragedy is a 1701 play by the English writer Mary Pix. Despite its title, it is a comedy.

== Plot ==
The play takes place amidst conflict between the Persians and the Medes. Leamira is the daughter of the Persian king, Darius. Her father commands her to marry Tygranes (Prince of the Medes), but she loves the Persian general Cleomedon.

At the end of the play, it is revealed that Cleomedon is actually the son of Astyages, King of the Medes. Leamira and Cleomedon are therefore free to marry.

== Original cast ==
The original Lincoln's Inn Fields cast included John Bowman as Darius, Barton Booth as Cleomeden, John Verbruggen as Cyraxes, Benjamin Husband as Tyranges, Elizabeth Barry as Leamires and Anne Bracegirdle as Cytheria.

== Bibliography ==
- Burling, William J. A Checklist of New Plays and Entertainments on the London Stage, 1700-1737. Fairleigh Dickinson Univ Press, 1992.
- Lowerre, Kathryn. Music and Musicians on the London Stage, 1695-1705. Routledge, 2017.
- Nicoll, Allardyce. History of English Drama, 1660-1900, Volume 2. Cambridge University Press, 2009.
