= Tamerlane (play) =

1701 play

- Original language: English
- Written by: Nicholas Rowe
- Genre: Tragedy

Premiere
- Date: December 1701
- Place: Lincoln's Inn Fields Theatre, London

Tamerlane is a 1701 history play by the English writer Nicholas Rowe. A tragedy, it portrays the life of the Timur, the fourteenth century conqueror and founder of the Timurid Empire. Rowe, a staunch Whig, used the historical story as an allegory for the life of William III who resembles his portrayal of Tamerlane while his opponent the Ottoman leader Bayezid I was equivalent to William's longstanding opponent Louis XIV of France. An earlier version of the story Tamburlaine was written by Christopher Marlowe during the Elizabethan era with a very different focus in the context of the English Renaissance.

It was first performed in December 1701 at the Lincoln's Inn Fields Theatre in London, one of the two patent theatres of the era, and was published the following year by Jacob Tonson. The original cast included Thomas Betterton as Tamerlane, John Verbruggen as Bajazet, Barton Booth as Axalla, William Powell as Moneses, George Pack as Stratocles, William Fieldhouse as Prince of Tanais, John Freeman as Omar, John Corey as Mirvan, Benjamin Husband as Zama, Elizabeth Barry as Arpasia and Anne Bracegirdle as Selima. Betterton spoke the prologue and the play was dedicated to the Whig politician Lord Hartington, the future Duke of Devonshire.

Rowe's play was partly framed as a riposte to the Tory-supporting work about Timur The Generous Conqueror by Bevil Higgons, which endorsed direct hereditary monarchy. It was first performed following the death of the deposed James II and the succession of his French-backed young son James as the Jacobite claimant to the throne, and in this context Rowe arguably used it to suggest that the coming war with France was "an obligation, not a choice". In addition the character of the Italian Prince Axalla was modelled on Prince Eugene of Savoy, an Austrian commander who had come to fame in the Great Turkish War and would subsequently become a popular figure in Britain fighting alongside the Duke of Marlborough.

== Performances history ==
A tradition developed of performing the play on either the birthday of William III (4 November) or the anniversary of his landing in England in 1688 (5 November), dates which also coincided with the anniversary of the discovery of the Gunpowder Plot. The play fell out of favour during the Tory government of Robert Harley between 1710 and 1714 and was not performed. In politically-charged Dublin the play was performed in November 1712 with a controversial prologue by Samuel Garth, despite a ban by the Irish Council, and provoked a riot. After its absence in London, it was then revived following the Hanoverian Succession alongside Jane Grey, another new pro-Whig play by Rowe. Rowe was rewarded for his support of the Whig cause by being made Poet Laureate in 1715. After Joseph Addison's Cato it was the second most-performed tragedy on the eighteenth century stage, aside from Shakespeare.

== Bibliography ==
- Black, Jeremy. Culture in Eighteenth-Century England: A Subject for Taste. A&C Black, 2007.
- Braverman, Richard. Plots and Counterplots: Sexual Politics and the Body Politic in English Literature, 1660–1730. Cambridge University Press, 1993.
- Burling, William J. A Checklist of New Plays and Entertainments on the London Stage, 1700–1737. Fairleigh Dickinson Univ Press, 1992.
- Caines, Michael The Plays and Poems of Nicholas Rowe, Volume I: The Early Plays. Taylor & Francis, 2016.
- Canfield, J. Douglas. The Broadview Anthology of Restoration and Early Eighteenth-Century Drama. Broadview Press, 2001.
- Ramsland, Clement. Whig Propaganda in the Theatre, 1700–1742. University of Minnesota., 1940.
- Wilkinson, Hazel. Edmund Spenser and the Eighteenth-Century Book. Cambridge University Press, 2017.
