= The Gamester (Centlivre) =

Play by Susanna Centlivre

- Original language: English
- Written by: Susanna Centlivre
- Genre: Comedy

Premiere
- Date: January 1705
- Place: Lincoln's Inn Fields Theatre

The Gamester is a 1705 comedy by the English writer Susanna Centlivre. This marked the first time Centlivre had a star cast in one of her productions, and it was a hit. The play was one of the most popular of the nineteen she wrote, and it was fairly often staged until 1745, before later being revived at Covent Garden in 1789 under an alternative title. It is inspired by the 1696 play Le Joueur by the French writer Jean-François Regnard, with numerous changes made to reflect its English setting most particularly in its moral about the "ill consequences of gaming".

The original cast included John Freeman as Sir Thomas Volere, John Corey as Dorante, John Verbruggen as Young Volere, Thomas Betterton as Lovewell, William Fieldhouse as Marquess of Hazard, George Pack as Hector, Elizabeth Barry as Lady Wealthy, Anne Bracegirdle, as Angelica and Elizabeth Willis as Mrs Security.

== Bibliography ==
- Tanya M. Caldwell. Popular Plays by Women in the Restoration and Eighteenth Century. Broadview Press, 2011.
