= Charles Shadwell (playwright) =

English playwright

Charles Shadwell (fl. 1710 – died 1726) was an English playwright of the 18th century, date of birth unknown. He was the son of Thomas Shadwell, the playwright and Poet Laureate.

He served in the army during the War of the Spanish Succession, before becoming the supervisor of the excise in Kent.

Shadwell was the author of the comedy The Fair Quaker of Deal staged at the Drury Lane Theatre in London in 1710 and The Humours of the Army (1713).

From 1715 to 1720 he was the resident playwright at the Smock Alley Theatre in Dublin, the leading Irish theatre at the time. In 1719, his tragedy Rotherick O'Connor, King of Connaught was staged at Smock Alley, and with the comedy Irish Hospitality, and other plays, collected and published in 1720.

== Bibliography ==
- Edwards, Philip. Threshold of a Nation: A Study in English and Irish Drama. Cambridge University Press, 1979.
