= Margaret Bicknell =

Scottish actress

- Born: Margaret Younger c. 1695; Edinburgh, Scotland
- Died: 1723 (aged c. 28); London, England, Great Britain
- Occupations: Actress and dancer

Margaret Bicknell (c. 1695 – 1723) was a Scottish theatre actress and dancer.

== Early life and education ==
She was sister of Elizabeth Younger, an actress, who survived her some years. Younger informed Mrs. Saunders, a well-known actress who had for some years quitted the stage, that her father and mother, James and Margaret Younger, were born in Scotland.

== Career ==
Bicknell's first known appearance was at the Theatre Royal, Drury Lane, located in London, England, on 20 August 1702. On 7 November 1706, we hear of Mrs. Bicknell playing, at the Haymarket Theatre, "Edging, a Chambermaid," in The Careless Husband of Cibber, her associates including Wilks, Cibber, Mrs. Oldfield, and Mrs. Barry.

Subsequent years saw her appear as Miss Prue in Congreve's "Love for Love," Miss Hoyden in the "Relapse" of Vanbrugh, Melantha in "Marriage à la Mode," and other characters of which sauciness and coquetry are the chief features. Her name appears to a petition signed by Barton Booth and other actors of Drury Lane Theatre, presented apparently around 1710 to Queen Anne, complaming of the restrictions upon the performances of the petitioners imposed by the lord chamberlain. In 1713, she appeared in John Gay's comedy The Wife of Bath and two years later in The What D'Ye Call It.

She remained at Drury Lane from 1708 to 1721, on 14 February of which year she 'created' the character of Lady Wrangle in Cibber's comedy, the "Refusal." Her last recorded appearance was on 2 April 1723. The 'Daily Journal' of 25 May following announces her death from consumption.

== Personal life ==
Her sister Elizabeth Younger was also a stage actress and dancer.
