= Susanna Centlivre =

English actor and writer (c. 1669 – 1723)

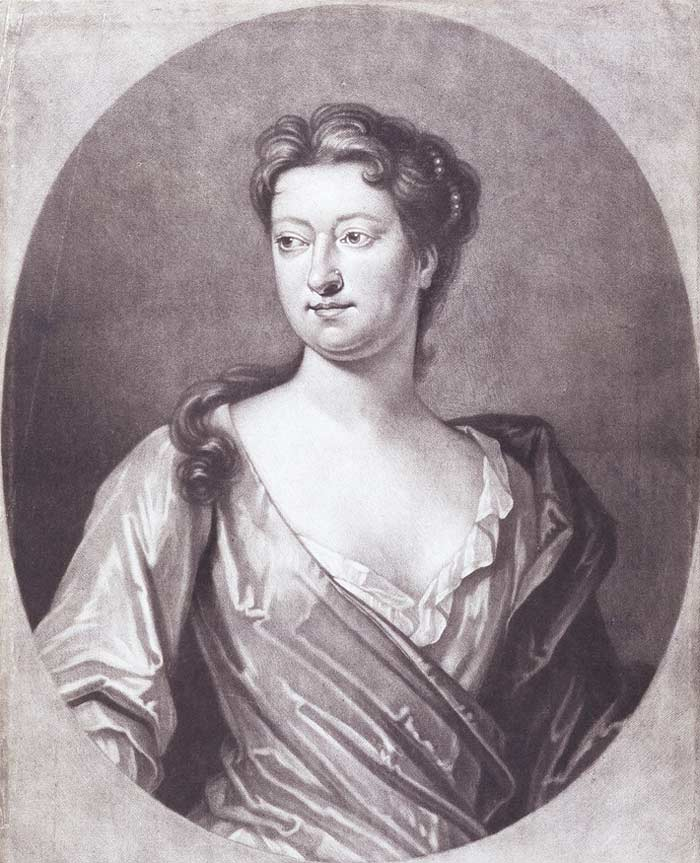
- A mezzotint of Susanna Centlivre by Peter Pelham (1720), based on a painting by D. Fermin
- Born: Susanna Freeman c. 1669
- Died: 1 December 1723 (aged 53–54); Spring Gardens, London, England
- Resting place: St. Paul's, Covent Garden, London
- Occupations: Poet; playwright; actress

Susanna Centlivre (/sɛntˈlɪvər/ sent-LIV-ər or /sɛntˈliːvər/ sent-LEE-vər; born Susanna Freeman; baptised 1669 – 1 December 1723), also known professionally as Susanna Carroll, was an English poet, actress, and "the most successful female playwright of the eighteenth century". Centlivre's "pieces continued to be acted after the theatre managers had forgotten most of her contemporaries." During a long career at the Theatre Royal, Drury Lane, she became known as the second woman of the English stage, after Aphra Behn.

== Life ==
The main source of information on Centlivre's early life is Giles Jacob, who claimed he had received an account of it directly from her. This was published in The Poetical Register of 1719, yet it includes little information about her early life. Centlivre was probably baptised Susanna Freeman at Whaplode, Lincolnshire on 20 November 1669, as the daughter of William Freeman of Holbeach and his wife, Anne, the daughter of Mr Marham, a gentleman of Lynn Regis, Norfolk. Her father was a dissenter and a parliamentarian; as a result, the family certainly faced persecution at the Restoration.

Several biographical sources state that Holbeach was the possible place of her birth or at least the place where she spent her childhood. There is some mystery surrounding her early life, but it is generally believed that her father died when she was three, her mother died shortly after remarrying, and her stepfather married soon after that.

There are two stories that tell of her transition to acting and eventual arrival in London. The romanticized version has Centlivre found weeping by the roadside by Anthony Hammond, a student at St John's College, Cambridge. Enraptured by her manners and good looks, he smuggled her into his college, where she was disguised as a male cousin, Jack. There she remained hidden for some months studying grammar and acquiring "some of the terms of logic, rhetoric, and ethics" before "attracting too much attention" and deciding to head to London. The more believable scenario has her joining a company of strolling actors in Stamford (about 25 miles from Holbeach), where she gained popularity acting in breeches roles, for which she was suited due to a "small Wen on her left Eye lid, which gave her a Masculine Air."

Centlivre's skill in such roles charmed many men, especially Mr Fox, who would soon become Centlivre's first husband when she was sixteen. However, he died less than a year later. Following Fox's death, Centlivre is claimed to have married an army officer named Carroll, who died in a duel a year and a half after their union. She kept the name Carroll until her next marriage. Although much of her early years is speculation, biographers agree that Susanna's knowledge was predominantly self-acquired through reading and conversation. Looking at her use of French drama, it is not hard to see that Centlivre also had a sound knowledge of the French language. After her husband's death, Centlivre spent much of her time in London, where she turned to writing partly for financial support.

By 1706, Centlivre had made a small name for herself; however, she still relied on financial support from strolling (acting). It was during a performance when she played the role of Alexander the Great in Nathaniel Lee's tragedy The Rival Queens, or the Death of Alexander the Great for the court at Windsor Castle that she caught the eye of Joseph Centlivre. Though he was of a lower social class, a mere "yeoman of the mouth [cook] to Queen Anne," they were married on 23 April 1707.

There is no evidence to suggest where they resided for the first seven years of their marriage. Eventually, in late 1712 or early 1713, the Centlivres moved into residence at Buckingham Court, Spring Gardens, paying the highest rent second only to the Admiralty Office. After a long, illustrious career in high literary esteem with writings in the form of poems, letters, books, and, most famously, plays, Susanna Centlivre died on 1 December 1723, from lingering effects of a serious illness contracted in 1719. The Evening Post, London Journal, British Journal, and Weekly Journal had brief notices of her death. Centlivre's body was buried three days after her death in St. Paul's, Covent Garden. A little over a year later, her husband followed.

== Writings 1700–1710 ==
Giles Jacob mentions Centlivre's inclination to poetry with her first poem being written when she was merely seven years old. However, her first published work, a series of five letters, would not appear until May 1700. These letters contain playful, witty back-and-forth banter between her and the correspondent. Although early in her career, she is complimented as woman of sense. In July 1700, Abel Boyer published a second set of Centlivre's letters (among other writers). This time, Centlivre published the letters under the name of Astrea, a pen name previously used by Aphra Behn, a move that was most likely motivated by a wish for public attention. In the letters, the exchange between Astrea and Celadon (Capt. William Ayloffe) are of particular interest due to their intense romantic suggestions. However, biographers generally agree that this was merely practice for the epistolary fiction form.

We also get a glimpse of Centlivre's poetry in her correspondence with George Farquhar, who also sometimes published under the name Celadon. Again, it is hard to suggest a definitive romantic relationship between Farquhar and Centlivre; the letters may have been intended for the public eye. Centlivre continued in September 1700, when she contributed a poem, "Of Rhetorick," under the name Polumnia, to The Nine Muses, an elegiac poetry collection left on the grave of John Dryden.

In October 1700, Centlivre published her first play, The Perjur'd Husband: or, The Adventures of Venice. This tragicomedy (although considered a tragedy at the time) was performed at the Theatre Royal, Drury Lane and, according to Centlivre, "went off with a general Applause." It was published under Susanna's own name, and the prologue made a point of pride out of its female authorship. By the end of 1700, with a long list of literary acquaintances and actors alike, Centlivre was well established in London.

Her next play, The Beau's Duel, was performed in June 1702. Well received in its own right, the play did not see a lengthy stage life. Over the next five years or so, Centlivre's work was less successful. As a result, her next two plays, The Stolen Heiress (December 1702) and Love's Contrivance (June 1703), were performed under attempts to conceal the sex of the author. Although received well, all of Centlivre's plays up to this point had been performed at inopportune times in the season. It wasn't until Love's Contrivance that the experience and reputation of the cast allowed for a three-night run (in addition to some later productions and an eventual revival, three years after her death). Centlivre's next comedy, The Gamester, was first performed in February 1705. Here, she declared her intent to reform gamblers. This play was Centlivre's most successful to date and was frequently revived in later years.

Centlivre's The Busie Body

In 1705, Centlivre, in a brief moment away from the theatre, wrote a complimentary poem for a collection by Sarah Fyge Egerton. Centlivre continued the gambling theme in her next play entitled The Basset Table, performed in November 1705. Although not explicit regarding its authorship, this play's Epilogue indirectly attributes the play to a woman. Following her success with The Basset Table, Centlivre wrote Love at a Venture and saw it performed in 1706.

Centlivre was a highly successful professional playwright. A similarly renowned playwright, Colley Cibber, was accused of borrowing parts of Love at a Venture to write his own play, The Double Gallant. However, in an apparent reconciliation he accepted a part in Centlivre's next play, The Platonick Lady (November 1706). Having grown weary with anonymous authorship, Centlivre used the preface to The Platonick Lady to express her distaste for society's outlook on the female writer.

Following her third marriage, Centlivre took some time off. This decision turned out to be a good one; her time away resulted in her most successful comedy, The Busie Body (May 1709). The play ran for thirteen nights, a remarkable run for the time, and was revived the following season.

Centlivre's next play, The Man's Bewitch'd, was first performed in December 1709, and satirized the squirearchy of Tory gentlemen. This political satire appeared during an ongoing election campaign, and the Tory press struck back. The weekly Female Tatler printed an "interview" that it claimed to have done with Centlivre, where she insulted the actors and blamed them for all her failures. The acting company was on the verge of walking out on her before she persuaded them that she was the victim of a politically inspired hoax.

== Writings 1710–1723 ==
All of Centlivre's later works have a clear anti-Tory, pro-Whig political affiliation, "notable through the characters of tory fathers or guardians, whose party fervour forms another obstacle to the happiness of young lovers – always whiggishly inclined."

In March 1710, Centlivre released A Bickerstaff's Burying, a political satire. Despite the risk of annoying Anne, Queen of Great Britain, Centlivre was not afraid to openly support the Hanoverian succession. Next, Centlivre took it upon herself to write a sequel to the successful The Busy Body, entitled Marplot, or, The Second Part of the Busie-Body (December 1710). Although it didn't receive the same attention as its precursor, it was performed seven times. The sequel reflects Centlivre's continuing interest in politics, specifically the battle between Whig and Tory. Once again, Centlivre turned to poetry with a complimentary poem on the recovery of the Duke of Newcastle's daughter. Although this might seem an odd subject to modern readers, Centlivre was merely following conventional protocol in securing patronage.

With her next comedy, The Perplex'd Lovers (January 1712), Centlivre became outspoken in her political stance. Most of her plays over the next five years were directly related to the advancement of the Whigs and the House of Hanover. The play's success was limited, and it only ran for three nights. The theatre managers banned the Epilogue for fear of backlash.

In 1713, after moving into a new home in Buckingham Court, Centlivre wrote two poems. The first poem is a response to Anne Oldfield's brilliant performance in a play. The second, entitled "The Masquerade," is addressed to the Duke d'Aumont, ambassador from France. Centlivre's next play was The Wonder (April 1714), a comedy. She dedicated the play to the then Duke of Cambridge. This political move of showing loyalty to the House of Hanover was risky, but, in the end, paid off for Centlivre when the Duke ascended the throne as King George I. We can see her gloating in an ironic autobiographical poem, "A Woman's Case." Not solely a political play, The Wonder was a popular hit and notably was the performance in which famous actor/playwright David Garrick chose "to make his farewell to the stage on 10 June 1776."

Centlivre's next two plays, A Gotham Election and A Wife Well Manag'd, were published in 1715 (although A Gotham Election would not be performed until 1724) and fell under her now common theme, political farce. These two plays illustrate how Centlivre was ahead of her time with her exemplification of social problems in the theatre.

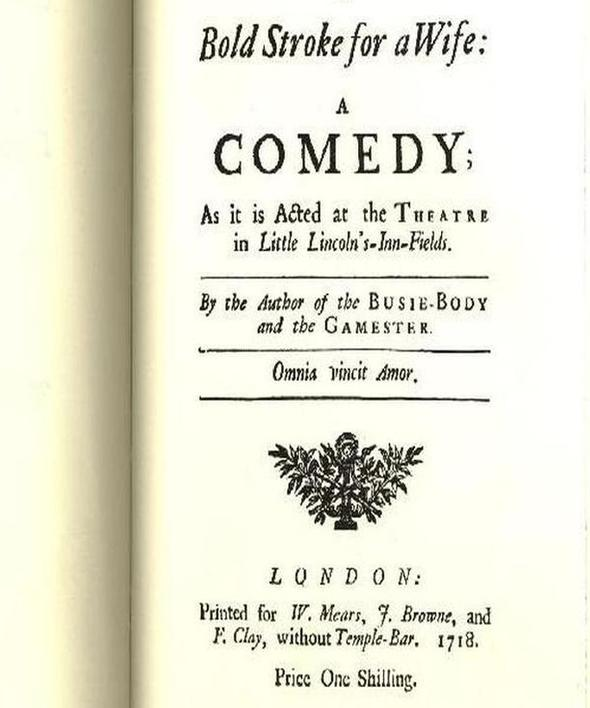
Title page of Centlivre's A Bold Stroke for a Wife, 1718

In 1716, as a response to a Whig leader's illness and subsequent retirement, Centlivre contributed a poem to a small publication entitled State Poems. Her contribution was "Ode to Hygeia". She followed this with a series of poems in response to the political climate of the time. After attacks by satirist Alexander Pope on Centlivre and others, she and co-author Nicholas Rowe published her next play, The Cruel Gift (December 1716). It was her first heroic drama (often considered tragedy): the reception was good, and the play was performed seven times that year. In February 1718 Centlivre published A Bold Stroke for a Wife. This comical farce was very successful and is considered by some to be her best play. It is the only play for which Centlivre claims complete originality. (It was not uncommon for dramatists to procure various plot pieces and characters from other works.)

Continuing her political works, in 1717 Centlivre directed her attention to Charles XII, a Swedish king threatening to attack England. She published a poem, entitled "An Epistle from a Lady of Great Britain to the King of Sweden, on the intended Invasion," in response to Charles's threats. We have two records of poems to Mr. Rowe (Nicholas) in 1718. The first was written during a visit to her hometown of Holbeach and is entitled "From the Country, To Mr. ROWE in Town. M.DCC.XVIII." The second poem followed Rowe's death and is entitled "A PASTORAL TO THE Honoured Memory of Mr. ROWE." The sincerity in the elegy brought Centlivre positive attention.

In 1719, Centlivre became seriously ill. Although the effects of this illness would linger until her death, she continued to write. We find two more published poems in 1720. Both are included in Anthony Hammond's A New Miscellany of Original Poems, Translations, and Imitations. Following this, Centlivre published a poem entitled "A Woman's CASE: in an Epistle to CHARLES JOYE, Esq; Deputy-Governor of the South Sea", that traces her political associations and shines some light on her relationship with her husband. She continued to write poetry until her death. Her last play, The Artifice, was produced in October 1722 and published the following year.

== Themes and genres ==
Centlivre reflected positively on England's political, economic, and juridical systems. Her plays were often concerned with a theme of liberty within the areas of marriage and citizenry.

=== Politics ===
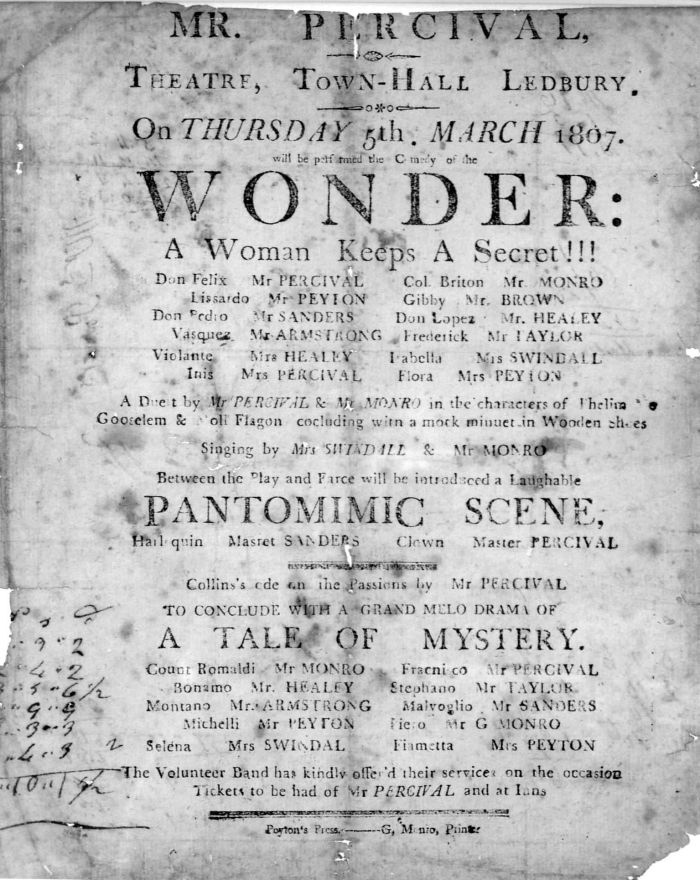
Poster for 1807 production of Centlivre's The Wonder: A Woman Keeps A Secret!!!

Centlivre was sometimes a political dramatist. She wrote anti-Catholic plays, as is shown by some of her play dedications, prologues and epilogues. This is especially apparent in her dedication at the beginning of The Wonder, where she expressed her strong support for the proposed Protestant succession. The majority of her plays eschew party political commentary, her only work with an overtly political agenda being The Gotham Election. Some of her more controversial epilogues, such as that of The Perplexed Lovers where she identifies the out-of-favour war hero Marlborough as the "ONE", were not spoken in the theatre, just published in the play text.

=== Comedies ===
Centlivre is best known for her comedies, often following the Spanish style, which is "romantic in plot and spirit, [but containing] far more of the emotions of love and jealousy than Restoration comedies." This type of comedy tended to focus on the romantic intrigues among a triangle of wealthy main characters (generally one young woman being fought over by two young men, one promiscuous, the other devoted). It often involves disguises, duels (or talk of them), and scenarios that balance emotion and farce. Her best-known comedies feature quick-witted female intellects to equal their male counterparts. Due to the widespread prejudice against women playwrights, Centlivre sometimes wrote under a pseudonym, or withheld more controversial messages.

=== Tragedies ===
Little positive is said of her two tragi-comedies, The Perjur'd Husband and The Stolen Heiress, although her pure tragedy, The Cruel Gift, was somewhat better received. These plays were thought to have "figures [that] are shadowy and [a] plot [that] is unconvincing."

== Reception and criticism ==
Her plays were popular with audiences but less so with literary critics such as William Hazlitt who wrote condescendingly of them. Satirist Alexander Pope found her writings offensive for political and religious reasons, and thought them a threat to greater dramatists by pandering to popular taste. He assumed that she had helped with Edmund Curll's anti-Catholic pamphlet The Catholic Poet: or, Protestant Barnaby's Sorrowful Lamentation. Regardless of her peers' opinions, her plays continued to be performed for over 150 years after her death.

The diarist Agnes Porter, governess to the children of Henry Fox-Strangways, 2nd Earl of Ilchester, saw a performance of Centlivre's The Busy Body at the Little Theatre, Haymarket on 7 March 1791, but wrote that it was "very badly performed".

== List of works ==
=== Plays ===
- The Perjur'd Husband: or, The Adventures of Venice (1700)
- The Beau's Duel; or, A Soldier for the Ladies (1702)
- The Stolen Heiress; or, the Salamanca Doctor Outplotted (1702; published 1703)
- Love's Contrivance (1703)
- The Gamester (1705)
- The Basset Table (1705)
- Love at a Venture (1706)
- The Platonick Lady (1706)
- The Busie Body (1709)
- The Man's Bewitched; or, The Devil to Do About Her (1709)
- A Bickerstaff's Burying; or, Work for the Upholders (1710)
- Marplot; or, the Second Part of The Busie Body (1710; published 1711)
- The Perplex'd Lovers (1712)
- The Wonder: A Woman Keeps A Secret!!! (1714)
- A Gotham Election (1715, never produced)
- A Wife Well Managed (1715; produced 1724)
- The Cruel Gift (1716; published 1717)
- A Bold Stroke for a Wife (1718)
- The Artifice (1722)

=== Books ===
- Familiar and Courtly Letters as Astraea (1700)
- The Second Volume of Familiar Letters as Astraea (1701)
- Letters of Wit, Politicks and Morality as Astraea (1701)

=== Poems ===
- "Polminia: Of Rhetorick" (1700, unconfirmed)
- "To Mrs. S.F. on her incomparable Poems" (1706)
- "The Masquerade, A Poem, Humbly Inscribed to his Grace the Duke D'Aumont" (1713)
- "On the Right Honourable Charles Earl of Halifax being made Knight of the Garter" (1714)
- "A Poem Humbly Presented to His Most Sacred Majesty George, King of Great Britain, France, and Ireland. Upon his Accession to the Throne" (1714)
- "An Epistle to Mrs. Wallup, Now in the Train of Her Royal Highness, The Princess of Wales" (1714)
- "To Her Royal Highness, the Princess of Wales. At her Toylet, on New-Years Day" (1715)
- "Ode to Hygeia" (1716)
- "Upon the Bells ringing at St. Martins in the Fields, on St. George's Day, 1716, being the Anniversary of Queen Anne's Coronation" (1716)
- "These Verses were writ on King George's Birth-Day, by Mrs. Centlivre, and sent to the Ringers while the Bells were ringing at Holbeach in Lincolnshire" (1716)
- "An Epistle to the King of Sweden from a Lady of Great-Britain" (1717)
- "A Woman's Case: In an Epistle to Charles Joye, Esq; Deputy-Governor of the South-Sea" (1720)
- "From the Country, to Mr. Rowe in Town" (1720)
- "A Pastoral to the Honoured Memory of Mr. Rowe" (1720)
- "To the Duchess of Bolton, Upon seeing her Picture drawn unlike her" (1720)
- "To the Earl of Warwick, on his Birthday" (1720)
- "Letter on the Receipt of a Present of Cyder" (1721)

=== Works featuring Centlivre ===
- Classic Plays by Women (2019)

== See also ==
- List of early-modern British women playwrights
