= Theatre criticism =

Genre of arts criticism

Theatre criticism is a genre of arts criticism, and the act of writing or speaking about the performing arts such as a play or opera.

Theatre criticism is distinct from drama criticism, as the latter is a division of literary criticism whereas the former is a critique of the theatrical performance. Dramas or plays as long as they stay in the print form remain a part of literature. They become a part of the performing arts as soon as the written words of the drama are transformed into performance on the stage or any arena suitable for viewers to see. So the literary craft gives birth to a stage production. Likewise a criticism of a written play has a different character from that of a theatre performance.

== Criticism vs review ==
There is a distinctive dissimilarity between theatre criticism and a theatre review. Both of them deal with the dramatic arts as they are performed. But they are done in different ways and for different purposes. Both have strong rationalities to support the observations expressed, both are analytical, and both deal with the commendable as well as the blemishes of the production.

=== Review ===
A theatre review is a short essay for the ordinary uninitiated readers who get to know about the play being performed, about the group staging the play, and its director and other actors. Basically a review is a subjective discourse hinting on the cultural and artistic significance of the production. The storyline is discussed as it is believed to be the mainstay of the production. The discussion reflects an instant reaction of viewing the performance. An overall clinical analysis of each department of the production, like that of acting, stage craft, lighting designs and its implementation, background scoring, dress and costume designing, make-up etc., and even the script that had been prepared for the staging, is made by the reviewer. A review is published during the period when the play is "on", that is, when the play is being regularly staged. This requires a speedy writing of the piece. Thus, a review lacks any deep analytical discourse or investigative studies of the different aspects. It never gives any conclusive verdict about the production, as such.

=== Criticism ===
Theatre criticism, on the other hand, is a deep analytical discourse of the production against the backdrop of the theatre-arts as a whole. The social and political bearings that have relevance to the play are highlighted, so also the cultural import. Hence, the discussion becomes a highly theoretical objective discourse on the historical significance of the production. Criticism thus is an academic dissertation that is usually lengthy and may take a considerable time to write. The piece may be published even after the regular staging of the play has been suspended or stopped, or a subsequent production of a different play has been started by the group. Technicalities of the different aspects of the production are discussed in details together with exhaustive analysis of the rationalities of their execution. Criticism thus is an anatomical scrutiny of the production. The play is not discussed in detail as such, as it is job of the literary critic. Philosophical, political or moral criticism may be considered anti-theatrical.

== Coverage ==
Most major newspapers cover the arts in some form and theatre criticism may be included as a part of this arts coverage.

Specialist media exists to cover most artistic disciplines, in this field one such publication is The Stage (see the theatre magazines category for more).

== See also ==
- Category:Theatre critics
- Critic
- Theatre studies
- No Turn Unstoned
