= Brécourt (playwright) =

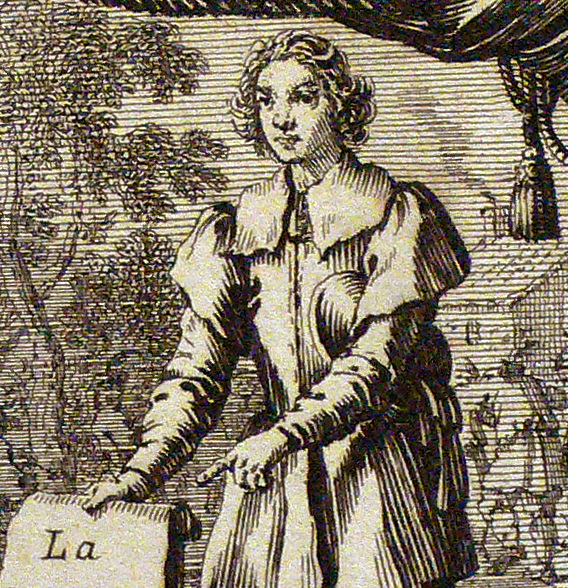
- Brécourt in 1666
- Born: Guillaume Marcoureau; 10 February 1636; Paris
- Died: 28 March 1685 (aged 49); Paris
- Occupations: Playwright; Actor
- Spouse: Étiennette Des Urlis

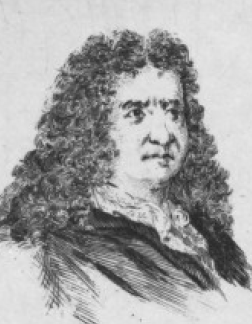
Guillaume Marcoureau

Guillaume Marcoureau, better known as Brécourt, (10 February 1638 – 28 March 1685) was a 17th-century French playwright and actor.

== Biography ==
The son of the comedians Pierre Marcoureau, called Beaulieu, and Marie Boulanger, he made his debut with his parents around 1650 in Philandre's troupe under the name "little Beaulieu". Shortly after, he took the pseudonym Brécourt, the name of the former hotel Brécourt that his father owned in joint possession in Paris.

On 18 December 1659, he married Étiennette Des Urlis (1629–1713), the daughter of comedians. He played at the Théâtre du Marais then joined the troupe de Molière which he left in 1664 for the Hôtel de Bourgogne; The illustration above shows the frontispiece of the publication in 1666 of The Nopce of village (John Lepautre engraving, detail, not published since 1682). It is likely that he created this play at the Palais-Royal two years before joining the troupe of the "Burgundians". After a few brief passages in Paris, he lived in London, where he had a Ballet et musique pour le divertissement du Roy de la Grande-Bretagne presented in 1674. Brécourt then directed the troupe of the prince of Orange which played at The Hague in 1680 and 1681. Back in Paris, he joined the Comédie-Française in 1682 and died in 1685, after he had renounced his comedian activity.

Brécourt especially distinguished himself in comedy, for the use of "coat roles". Louis XIV said that "he could make fagots laugh."

His plays are comedies in verse, very mediocre and which obtained some success only thanks to the game of the author.

In 1685 in Paris, to the point of death, he gave up his acting career in the historical context of excommunication of actors. He testified that he "acknowledged having heretofore made the actor by profession, gave up completely and promised from a true and sincere heart not to exercise any more nor up to the stage, should he return in complete and full health."

Brécourt died after an effort he made playing one of his own comedies, Timon.

== Works ==
- 1659: La Feinte mort de Jodelet (Paris)
- 1664: Le Grand benêt de fils
- 1666: Le Jaloux invisible (Paris)
- 1666: La Noce de village (Paris)
- 1667: L'Infante salicoque ou le Héros de roman
- 1674: Ballet et musique pour le divertissement du Roy de la Grande Bretagne (London)
- 1674: L'Ombre de Molière (Paris)
- 1674: La Régale des cousins de la cousine (Francfort)
- 1683: La Cassette
- 1684: Timon ou les Flatteurs trompés (Rouen)

== See also ==
- Excommunication of actors by the Catholic Church
