= Short View of the Immorality and Profaneness of the English Stage =

1698 pamphlet

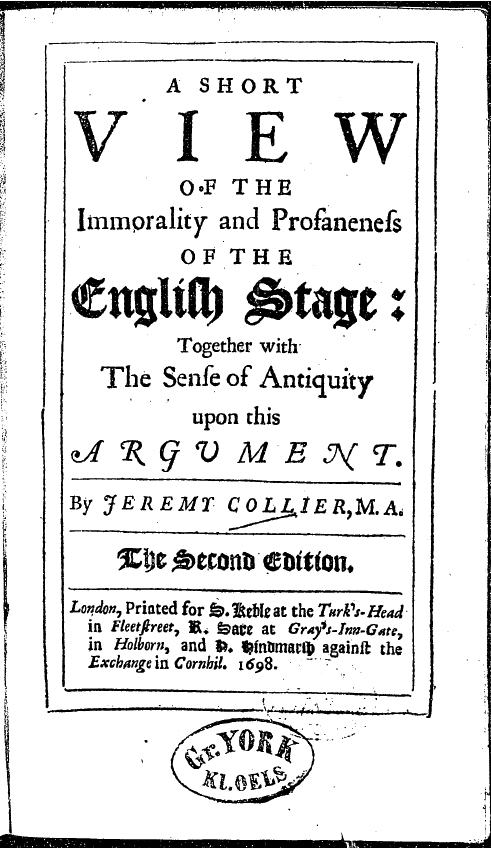
The second edition of Collier's Short View.

A Short View of the Immorality and Profaneness of the English Stage was an anti-theatre pamphlet published in March 1698 by the clergyman Jeremy Collier. Its targets included nearly all contemporary writers of London stage comedy, including William Wycherley, John Dryden, William Congreve, John Vanbrugh, and Thomas D'Urfey. It levels accusations of profanity, blasphemy, indecency, and undermining public morality through the sympathetic depiction of vice.

== Description ==
Collier begins his pamphlet with this conclusion: "[N]othing has gone farther in Debauching the Age than the Stage Poets, and Play-House" (Collier A2). He goes on, in great detail—despite the title—to give his evidence. For Collier, the immorality of the title stems from Restoration comedy's lack of poetic justice. With his exhaustively thorough readings—in a sense, pre-close reading close readings—he condemns the characters of Restoration comedies as impious and wicked and he condemned their creators (the playwrights) for failing to punish the playwrights' wicked "favorites". As the title suggests, Collier also charges the playwrights with profaneness, supporting his allegations with a number quotations from the plays (i.e. The Provoked Wife, The Relapse, et cetera). However, most of these charges are rather mild (at least according to the standards of most modern readers). Collier is, of course, unable to give examples of blatant blasphemy, for at the time, they were neither allowed on stage nor in print. However, Collier's strategy was innovative for his time (not to mention effective). Before A Short View of the Immorality and Profaneness of the English Stage, most anti-theatre pamphlets were merely nondescript diatribes (e.g. William Prynne's Histriomastix (1633)), but with his innovative techniques, Collier comprehensively indicted the entire Restoration stage (see also Antitheatricality#Restoration theatre).

== Reaction ==
Due to its publication, a pamphlet war ensued (for and against Collier's case), lasting sporadically until about 1726. In 1698, John Dennis wrote a pamphlet entitled: The Usefulness of the Stage. John Vanbrugh wrote a jestful retort, A Short Vindication of The Relapse and The Provok'd Wife From Immorality and Prophaneness (1698). In his pamphlet, Vanbrugh accuses Collier of being more upset by the unflattering depictions of clergymen than actual blasphemy. William Congreve, on the other hand, took the attacks on his plays quite seriously and refuted Collier's allegations in his Amendments of Mr. Collier's False and Imperfect Citations (1698). Other playwrights (like Thomas D'Urfey) preferred to give their reply on the stage. D'Urfey's play Campaigners (1698) comments on Collier's strictures. Collier would later fire back with his Defence of the Short View in 1699 and Edward Filmer would go on to defend Restoration theatre in 1707 with A Defence of Plays.

== Analysis ==
By the end of the 17th century, the Restoration comic style had already collapsed: the satiric presentation of English life gave way to the sentimental portrait (beginning in 1696 with Colley Cibber's Love's Last Shift) (Bernbaum 72). A Short View of the Immorality and Profaneness of the English Stage only signaled the swelling of public opposition to the real or imposed indecency of the plays staged over the last three decades. Collier writes in the introduction: "The business of plays is to recommend Vertue, and discountenance Vice" (Collier 1). However, the Restoration playwright rarely saw their function within Collier's strictures; in Congreve's dedication to The Double-Dealer (1693), he writes, "It is the business of a comic poet to paint the vices and follies of humankind" (Congreve 174). Congreve implies that the purpose of the comic playwright was to portray the vices and follies of society in order to correct them. Collier, instead, preferred his restrictions imposed on comedy (e.g. his rigid Neoclassical notions of dramatic decorum) and in doing so he followed a logic similar to what is found in the work of other critics who had imposed the law of poetic justice on tragedy (e.g. Thomas Rymer and his A Short View of Tragedy (1693)).

== Legacy ==
A Short View of the Immorality and Profaneness of the English Stage is often credited with turning the tide against the sexually explicit nature of Restoration comedy, but the tide had already begun turning; Collier's pamphlet was only swimming with the tide of public opinion. The truth was that Restoration comedy was over; it had been worn down by external factors, such as the Glorious Revolution and William III of England and Mary II of England's dislike of the theatre. Perhaps the most obvious sign of Restoration theatre's death came with the nolle prosequi (immunity from prosecution for earlier offences) granted to Collier by William III (for A Short View of the Immorality and Profaneness of the English Stage).
