= No Turn Unstoned =

Book by Diana Rigg

No Turn Unstoned: The Worst Ever Theatrical Reviews
- Author: Diana Rigg
- Publisher: Elm Tree Books
- Publication date: 1982
- Pages: 192 pp (first edition)
- ISBN: 0-241-10855-1
- OCLC: 10021707
- Dewey Decimal: 792.9/5 19
- LC Class: PN1707 .N59 1982

No Turn Unstoned: The Worst Ever Theatrical Reviews
- Author: Diana Rigg
- Publisher: Doubleday
- Publication date: 1983
- Publication place: United States
- Pages: 192 pp
- ISBN: 0385188625
- OCLC: 9465520
- Dewey Decimal: 792.9/5
- LC Class: PN1707 .N58 1983

No Turn Unstoned: The Worst Ever Theatrical Reviews
- Author: Diana Rigg
- Publisher: Arrow Books
- Publication date: 1983
- Publication place: United Kingdom
- Pages: 291 pp
- ISBN: 0-09-932270-6
- OCLC: 12469412
- Dewey Decimal: 792.9/5

No Turn Unstoned is a collection of "the worst ever theatrical reviews" compiled by the actress Diana Rigg. The first edition, published in the United Kingdom by Elm Tree Books in 1982 and in the United States by Doubleday, was followed by a paperback edition in 1983.

Rigg wrote to her many friends and acquaintances in the theatre and film industries and asked them to share their worst-ever reviews. She also researched theatre criticism and surviving comments from as far back as Ancient Greece. During the early 1990s, Rigg toured university campuses, reading excerpts from the book. All of the proceeds from the speaking tour, and the book itself, were donated to a theatrical charity.

== See also ==
- Theatre criticism
