= Minikillers =

Series of four short films

Minikillers is a four-episode series of dialogue-free short films from 1969 starring Diana Rigg. Rigg plays an unnamed character extremely similar to her character Emma Peel in The Avengers, although neither the production company nor any of the other cast or crew were related. They were produced in 1969 by an obscure German company called Accentfilms International. They were directed by Wolfgang von Chmielewski, from the German TV Station WDR, and written by Wolfgang and Michael von Chmielewski.

The Minikiller films were released on Super 8 mm colour film. It has been claimed that they were made to entertain people waiting at petrol stations in Germany, but there is not much evidence for this. They were also offered for sale for the home projector market. The films were shot in the Costa Brava in Spain. There is sound, but no dialogue. The titles of the four parts are Operation Costa Brava, Heroin, Macabre and Flamenco.

Diana Rigg, in an interview with Bravo done while filming in 1969, said that she was paid "not less" for Minikillers than she was paid for On Her Majesty's Secret Service. The cast and crew were mostly amateurs, and Rigg suffered various minor injuries due to the incompetent stuntmen. She never mentioned these films again in later interviews. Rigg also appeared in another similar short Super-8 black and white film made in Germany called Das Diadem (the diadem) in 1966. Das Diadem was also released in a shortened form in colour as Der Goldene Schlüssel (the golden key).

== Plot ==
Each episode follows the same pattern, evidently modelled on "The Avengers". It begins with Diana Rigg nonchalantly enjoying some leisure activity, then suffering a violent or even murderous attack, which she nonchalantly defeats in an amused fashion.

=== Operation Costa Brava ===
A "nosy journalist", played by Diana Rigg, lounging by the pool on holiday in Spain witnesses a murder in which a "minikiller" doll remotely controlled by a watch sprays poison onto a man. She takes the doll to her hotel room. She is attacked by a henchman, who accidentally drops the watch during the fight. As she is examining the watch in her hotel room, another remote-controlled minikiller doll enters, but fails to assassinate her.

=== Heroin ===
The woman is relaxing at a beach when she spots some scuba divers, and starts photographing them. She notices she is surrounded by mannequins, which unexpectedly start moving. The villains, offshore in a yacht, with bikini-clad girls holding the same dolls from the first episode, catch her and the mannequins in a fishing net buried in the sand, but she escapes the net and sneaks onto the yacht. She finds that the man killed in the first episode was an Interpol agent, and that the dolls are stuffed with heroin. After the boat docks, she makes a getaway using the fishing net as a weapon, and then stealing the boss's car.

=== Macabre ===
While the woman is enjoying coffee at an open air cafe, the villains plant a doll containing a bomb in her car. She drives off, and they follow her, but she spots the doll and then the villains, and uses the bomb to defeat them. She then encounters the villains at a graveyard, who invite her to enter a coffin. She beats them up and makes a getaway in a horse-drawn hearse.

=== Flamenco ===
The woman attends a flamenco performance led by El Sali. After the show, a minikiller doll attacks him. The woman goes in search of him, and as she enters his dressing room, she is knocked out. She wakes up bound and about to be crushed in a press. She stalls it by inserting a ring in its gears. Going back to the dressing room she finds the dancer's dead body, with his finger pointing to a secret entrance to a room full of contraband and dolls. The boss of the villains injects poison into a fresh minikiller doll, intending to use it on her, but the woman accidentally triggers the doll using the watch she found in the first episode, making it spray him in the face, killing him. The police arrive and take away the surviving villain, as the woman continues to enjoy her holiday.

== Cast ==
- Diana Rigg - Nosy journalist
- José Nieto (credited as Jose Nieto) - Smuggler boss
- Moisés Augusto Rocha (credited as Jack Rocha) - Bald henchman
- H. Coscollin - Henchman with rifle
- Mme. Million - Girlfriend of smuggler boss
- El Sali (as himself) - Flamenco dancer

== Crew ==
- Producers - H.G. Lückel, D. Nettemann
- Director - Wolfgang von Chmielewski
- Writers - Wolfgang von Chmielewski, Michael von Chmielewski
- Photography - Josef Kaufmann
- Camera Assistant - Gerd Weiss
- Score - Jonny Teupen, Hans Rettenbacher
- Production Assistant - H.G. Tienemann
- Script Girl - Ulrike Hercher
- Unit Manager - Virgilio Valle
- Film Editor - Erika Winter
- Make-up - Ingrid Hartkopf, Waltraud Winkler
- Technical Assistant - Lothar Büscher
- Title-Mirrors - Vittorio Bonato

== Production ==
The opening titles feature images of the minikiller dolls viewed in distorting mirrors. These effects were created by artist Victor Bonato, who is credited for "Title-Mirrors" as Vittorio Bonato, his original name. An uncredited singer alternately manically laughs, screams, and sighs the words "Minikillers" over the images of the dolls. The title track appears in only the first and third films.
