= Menachem Gueffen =

Israeli painter and caricaturist

- מנחם גפן
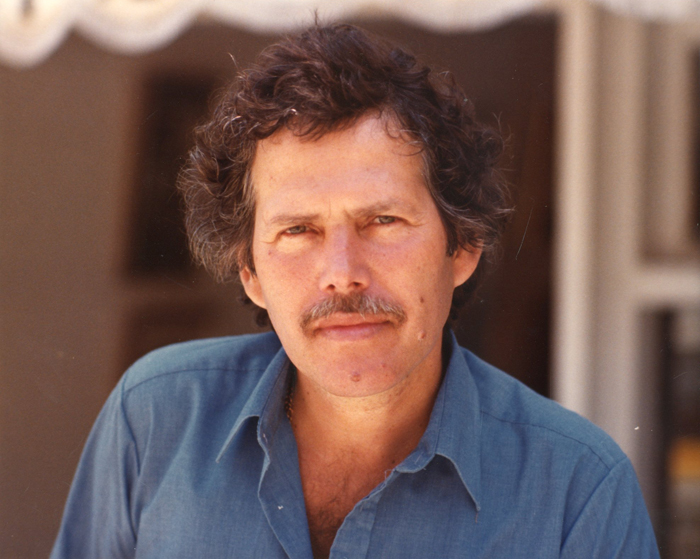
- Born: 19 March 1930; Haifa, Mandatory Palestine
- Died: 12 February 2016 (aged 85); Lécousse, France
- Occupation: Painter
- Spouses: Diana Rigg (m. 1973; div. 1976) Judy Hillman (m. 1987)

Menachem Gueffen (Hebrew: מנחם גפן; 19 March 1930 – 12 February 2016) was an Israeli painter and caricaturist.

== Career ==
Gueffen was born to Jewish parents from Poland in 1930 in the city of Haifa, then administered under the British Mandate, in what is now Israel. In 1947, 17 years old, he joined the Palmach. He was wounded in May 1948 in Malkia. He was hospitalized for eight months. From 1949 to 1953 he studied Graphics at Bezalel Art School, Jerusalem; and during 1959–63 at the École des Beaux-Arts, Paris. Gueffen works in large format, primarily in oils on canvas. His latest works are collages, oil and sack on natural canvas, jute or wood. He produces many drawings, and works essentially from sketches of models. He has also illustrated certain books: Robinson Crusoe published by the Israeli publisher Am Oved in the 1960s and he provided the illustrations for The World's Best Jewish Jokes by Ben Eliezer, published in 1984.

From 1967 to 1988, Gueffen lived and worked in London, in Europe and the United States. Gueffen's works are in private collections worldwide. His work appears in auctions in Europe and Israel. The Museum of Natural History of New York commissioned a work of five paintings by Gueffen depicting the "Life and Cycle of Judaism". His works are predominantly of women and his style has been described as "figurative-expressionist". However, the impact of encountering Rembrandt's Night Watch was one which spanned some twenty years for Gueffen, and culminated in Dialogue with Rembrandt's Night Watch, a work of nine paintings.

Gueffen is a listed artist in the Dictionnaire E. Benezit editions, 1976 and 1999 and the equivalent Italian dictionary, Commanducci. Benezit describes his work as expressionist-figurative.

== Private life ==
Gueffen's first wife was Shosh Paz (Shoshana Pazi, later Shoshana Dudai, a painter and artist from Kfar Yehezkel). Gueffen was married two more times, before marrying Diana Rigg in 1973; they divorced in 1976. He married Judy Hillman in 1987 and was based in France from 1991 until his death in 2016.
