= Diana Rigg =

English actress (1938–2020)

Dame Diana Rigg DBE
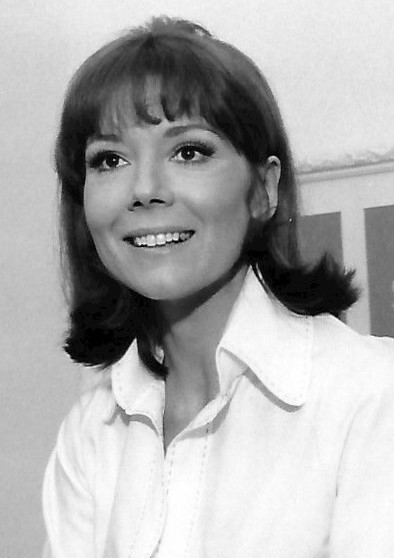
- Rigg in Diana, 1973
- Born: Enid Diana Elizabeth Rigg; 20 July 1938; Doncaster, West Riding of Yorkshire, England
- Died: 10 September 2020 (aged 82); London, England
- Education: Royal Academy of Dramatic Art
- Occupation: Actress
- Years active: 1957–2020
- Known for: The Avengers; Medea; On Her Majesty's Secret Service; Mother Love; Rebecca; Game of Thrones
- Spouses: Menachem Gueffen (m. 1973; div. 1976); Archie Stirling (m. 1982; div. 1990)
- Children: Rachael Stirling

Dame Enid Diana Elizabeth Rigg (20 July 1938 – 10 September 2020) was an English actress of stage and screen. Rigg joined the Royal Shakespeare Company in 1959. She became a sex symbol playing Emma Peel in the TV series The Avengers from 1965 to 1968, and played the wife of James Bond in On Her Majesty's Secret Service in 1969. She made her Broadway debut in Abelard & Heloise in 1971.

Her performance in the title role in Medea in the West End in 1993 followed by Broadway a year later won her the 1994 Tony Award for Best Actress in a Play, as well as earning her the first of four career Laurence Olivier Award nominations. A nine-time Emmy Award nominee, she won Best Supporting Actress in a Miniseries or TV Movie in 1997 for her role as Mrs. Danvers in the two-part miniseries Rebecca. She won the BAFTA TV Award for Best Actress in 1990 for the BBC four-part miniseries Mother Love and, in 2000, received a special honorary BAFTA. She was appointed CBE in 1988 and a Dame in 1994 for services to drama.

Rigg appeared in many TV series and films. She played Helena in A Midsummer Night's Dream (1968); Lady Holiday in The Great Muppet Caper (1981); and Arlena Marshall in Evil Under the Sun (1982). From 2013 to 2017 she played Olenna Tyrell in Game of Thrones. Her other television credits include You, Me and the Apocalypse (2015), Detectorists (2015), the Doctor Who episode "The Crimson Horror" (2013) with her daughter, Rachael Stirling, and Mrs Pumphrey in All Creatures Great and Small (2020). Her final role was in Edgar Wright's 2021 psychological horror film Last Night in Soho, completed just before her death.

== Early life and education ==
Enid Diana Elizabeth Rigg was born on 20 July 1938 in Doncaster, in the West Riding of Yorkshire (now in South Yorkshire), to Louis and Beryl Hilda Rigg (née Helliwell). She had a brother, Hugh, four years her senior. Her father, also born in Doncaster, worked in engineering and had moved to India to work for the railway to take advantage of the career opportunities there. Her mother travelled back to England for Rigg's birth. Between the ages of two months and eight years, Rigg lived in Bikaner, Rajasthan, India, where her father worked his way up to become a railway executive in the Bikaner State Railway. She spoke Hindi as her second language in those years.

At the age of eight she returned to England and was sent to a small boarding school called St. Christopher's in Great Missenden. Her father and mother returned to England in 1947/48 upon Indian independence. From the age of twelve Rigg attended a Moravian boarding school, Fulneck Girls School in Yorkshire. Rigg hated her boarding school, where she felt like a fish out of water, but believed that Yorkshire played a greater part in shaping her character than India did.

At Fulneck she was encouraged to act by Sylvia Greenwood, a drama teacher. Sylvia Greenwood persuaded her parents to let her audition for the Royal Academy of Dramatic Art (RADA), and when Rigg was offered a place, also arranged for travel and funding for her studies from Leeds Council. Rigg remained in touch with Greenwood for the rest of her life, regularly writing her Christmas cards and sending her invitations to her plays.

Rigg studied at RADA from 1955 to 1957, where her classmates included Glenda Jackson and Siân Phillips. While at RADA she played Natasha Abashwilli in a production of The Caucasian Chalk Circle at the York Festival in 1957.

== Theatre career ==
After graduating from RADA in 1957, she failed an audition for the Royal Shakespeare Company. She worked in various jobs including waitressing, as a model, and as a bank clerk. To gain an equity card, which was needed to work as an actor in those days, Rigg started working in repertory theatre, at first as an assistant stage manager. Her first performance as a professional actress was in a play called The Passing of the Third Floor Back at Chesterfield Civic Theatre in 1958. After Chesterfield she worked at Scarborough Opera House.

In 1959 she was accepted in the Royal Shakespeare Company (RSC). For the first year she took non-speaking roles and understudied. From 1960 onwards she played roles including Gwendolen in Jean Anouilh's Becket, Cordelia in King Lear and Adriana in The Comedy of Errors.. After completing a world tour including Russia and the United States, in 1964 Peter Hall offered her a three year contract to continue with the RSC, but she turned it down to travel and try working in other media.

In 1966, while filming The Avengers, she also appeared as Viola in Twelfth Night with the RSC.

After her screen roles in The Avengers and James Bond, she returned to the stage in the Ronald Millar play Abelard and Heloïse in London in 1970 and Broadway in 1971, in which she appeared nude with Keith Michell. She earned the first of four Tony Award nominations for Best Actress in a Play. She received her second nomination in 1975, for Célimène in The Misanthrope.

Rigg took leading roles in two Tom Stoppard plays, Dorothy Moore in Jumpers at the National Theatre in 1972, and Ruth Carson in Night and Day at the Phoenix Theatre in 1978.

In 1982 she appeared in the title role in the musical Colette, based on the life of the French writer and created by Tom Jones and Harvey Schmidt. It closed during an American tour en route to Broadway after bad reviews.

In 1987 she took the lead role of Phyllis in the West End production of Stephen Sondheim's musical Follies at the Shaftesbury Theatre, which was recorded by First Night Records.

Medea at Almeida Theatre in Islington in 1992 went to Wyndham's Theatre in 1993, and then to Broadway in 1994, where she received the Tony Award for Best Actress.

She appeared in Mother Courage at the National Theatre in 1995 and Who's Afraid of Virginia Woolf? at the Almeida Theatre in 1996, which went to the Aldwych Theatre in October 1996.

In 2004, she appeared as Violet Venable in the Lyceum Theatre, Sheffield's production of Tennessee Williams's play Suddenly Last Summer, which transferred to the Albery Theatre. In 2006, she appeared in a drama entitled Honour at Wyndham's Theatre in London's West End, which had a limited but successful run. In 2007 she appeared as Huma Rojo in The Old Vic's production of All About My Mother, adapted by Samuel Adamson based on a film directed by Pedro Almodóvar.

She appeared as Ranyevskaya in The Cherry Orchard at the Chichester Festival Theatre in 2008, returning there in 2009 to star in Noël Coward's Hay Fever. In 2011, she played Mrs Higgins in Pygmalion at the Garrick Theatre, opposite Rupert Everett and Kara Tointon, having played Eliza Doolittle 37 years earlier at the Albery Theatre.

In February 2018, she returned to Broadway in the non-singing role of Mrs Higgins in My Fair Lady. She commented, "I think it's so special. When I was offered Mrs Higgins, I thought it was just such a lovely idea." She received her fourth Tony nomination for the role.

=== No Turn Unstoned ===
In 1982, seeking something to do while her daughter was a toddler, Rigg wrote a book of negative theatrical reviews called No Turn Unstoned. After her divorce from Archie Stirling, she created a touring production where she would read from the book. She performed this again at the Edinburgh Festival Fringe in 2014.

== Film and television career ==
=== The Avengers ===
From 1965 to 1968 Rigg played Emma Peel in 51 episodes of the television series The Avengers opposite Patrick Macnee. She replaced Elizabeth Shepherd in the role at very short notice when Shepherd was dropped after filming two episodes. Rigg auditioned without ever having seen the programme.

Although she was hugely successful in the series, she disliked the lack of privacy that it brought and was not comfortable in her position as a sex symbol. In an interview with The Guardian in 2019, Rigg stated that "becoming a sex symbol overnight had shocked (her)". Neither did she like the way that she was treated by production company ABC Weekend TV. For her second series she held out for a pay rise. In 2019 – when gender pay inequality was very much in the news – she said that "not one woman in the industry supported me... Neither did Patrick [Macnee, her co-star]... I was painted as this mercenary creature by the press when all I wanted was equality. It's so depressing that we are still talking about the gender pay gap." She did not stay for a third year.

=== 1969-1982 ===
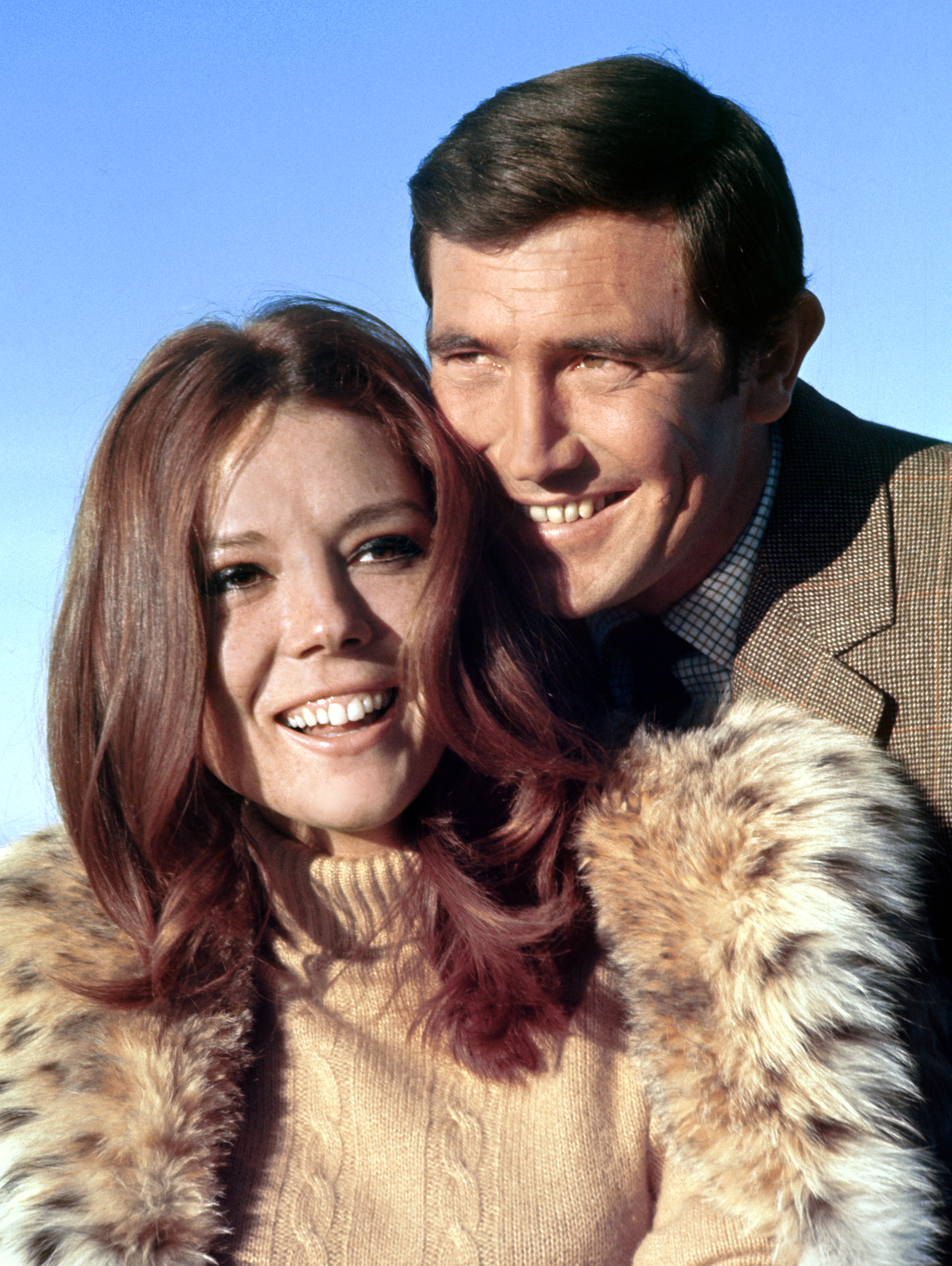
Rigg with George Lazenby as James Bond while filming On Her Majesty's Secret Service (1969).

In 1969 she played Tracy Bond, James Bond's only wife, opposite George Lazenby in On Her Majesty's Secret Service. She said she took the role with the hope that she would become better known in the United States.

Other films from this period include The Assassination Bureau (1969), Julius Caesar (1970), The Hospital (1971), Theatre of Blood (1973), and A Little Night Music (1977). In 1981 she played Lady Holiday in the film The Great Muppet Caper, a role she took to please her daughter. In 1982 she received acclaim for her performance as Arlena Marshall in Evil Under the Sun, an adaptation of an Agatha Christie novel.

On television, in 1973–74, she starred in a short-lived US sitcom called Diana., in 1975 as a nun in In This House of Brede, based on a book by Rumer Godden, in 1980 as the title character in The Marquise, a television adaptation of a play by Noël Coward, and in 1981 in the Yorkshire Television production of Ibsen's Hedda Gabler as Hedda.

=== 1980s and 90s ===
She appeared as Regan, the king's treacherous second daughter, in a Granada Television production of King Lear (1983), which starred Laurence Olivier in the title role. As Lady Dedlock, she costarred with Denholm Elliott in a television version of Dickens's Bleak House (BBC, 1985). In 1986, she played Miss Hardbroom in a Central Television adaptation of The Worst Witch, starring opposite Tim Curry. In 1987, she played the Evil Queen, Snow White's evil stepmother in the Cannon Movie Tales film adaptation of Snow White.

In 1989, she played Helena Vesey in Mother Love for the BBC. Her portrayal of an obsessive mother who was prepared to do anything, even murder, to keep control of her son won Rigg the 1990 BAFTA for Best Television Actress. In 1995, she appeared in a television adaptation of Danielle Steel's Zoya as Evgenia, the main character's grandmother. In 1996 she played Mrs Golightly in The Fortunes and Misfortunes of Moll Flanders. In 1997 she played Mrs Danvers in Rebecca, winning an Emmy. In 2000 she played Gladys Mitchell's detective Dame Beatrice Adela Le Strange Bradley, an eccentric old woman who works for Scotland Yard as a pathologist, in The Mrs Bradley Mysteries. The series was not a critical success and did not return for a second season.

From 1989 until 2003 she was one of the hosts of Mystery!, shown in the United States by PBS broadcaster WGBH, taking over from Vincent Price, her co-star in Theatre of Blood.

=== 2000s ===
In 2000 she played the older Rebeccah in an NBC miniseries In the Beginning, with the younger Rebeccah played by her daughter Rachael Stirling.

In 2006, she appeared as herself in one episode of the second series of Ricky Gervais's comedy Extras, alongside Daniel Radcliffe, and in the film The Painted Veil, in which she played a nun.

In 2013, she appeared in an episode of Doctor Who in a Victorian era–based story "The Crimson Horror" alongside her daughter, Rachael Stirling. The episode was specially written for them by Mark Gatiss.

That same year Rigg was cast as Lady Olenna Tyrell, a witty and sarcastic political mastermind known as the Queen of Thorns, in the third season of the HBO series Game of Thrones. Her performance earned her an Emmy nomination for Outstanding Guest Actress in a Drama Series for the 65th Primetime Emmy Awards in 2013. She reprised her role in season four of Game of Thrones, and in July 2014 received another Guest Actress Emmy nomination. In 2015 and 2016, she again reprised the role in seasons five and six in a role expanded from the books. In 2015 and 2018, she received two additional Guest Actress Emmy nominations. The character was killed off in the seventh season, with Rigg's final performance receiving wide critical acclaim. In 2019, Rigg said that she never watched Game of Thrones before or after her time on the show.

From 2015 to 2017, she appeared in the BBC Four comedy series Detectorists in the role of Veronica, the mother of protagonist Andy Stone's wife Becky, played again by her daughter Rachael Stirling.

In 2019 Rigg played Mrs Pumphrey for All Creatures Great and Small. Rigg died after the filming of the first season had been completed. Her final performance was in the British psychological horror film Last Night in Soho, in which she had a major supporting role. The film was in post-production at the time of her death and is dedicated to her memory.

== Personal life ==
=== Relationships and family ===
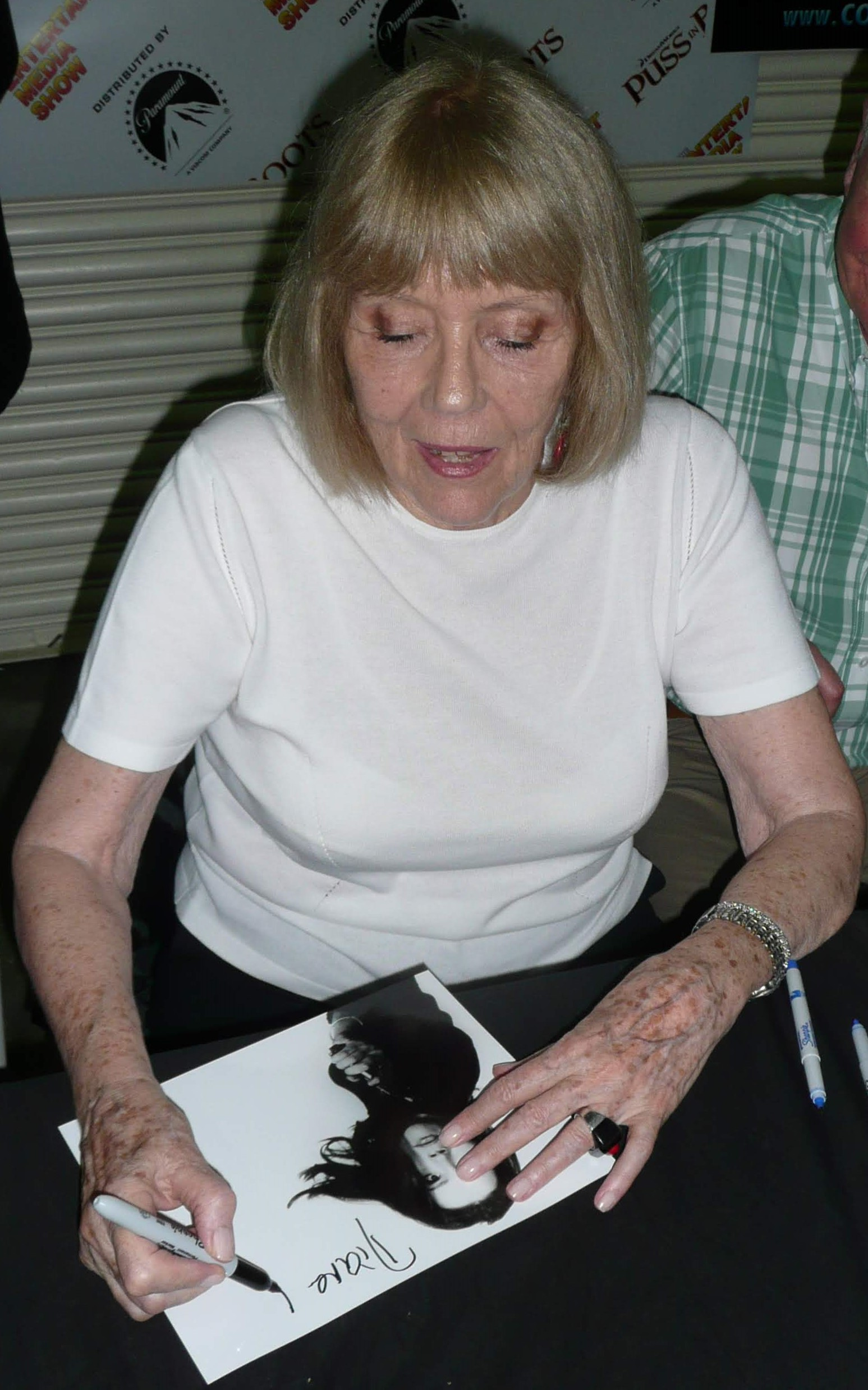
Rigg in 2011

In the 1960s, Rigg lived for eight years with director Philip Saville, gaining attention in the tabloid press when she disclaimed interest in marrying the older and already-married Saville, saying that she had no desire "to be respectable".

Saville would frequently disappear, leaving his son Dominic with Rigg, and Rigg would also send him money. While with Saville, she bought a house in a remote part of Ibiza, with no telephone or electricity. Her nearest neighbour was Terry-Thomas. She continued to use the house after breaking up with Saville. Rigg enjoyed swimming naked both in her pool and the sea. Terry-Thomas remarked that when he visited she was often in a state of undress.

Michael Parkinson, who first interviewed Rigg in 1972, described her as the most desirable woman he had ever met and who "radiated a lustrous beauty".

She married Menachem Gueffen, an Israeli painter, in 1973, but they argued constantly, and separated after eleven months, divorcing in 1976.

In 1977 Rigg had a daughter, Rachael Stirling, with Archie Stirling, a wealthy Scottish landowner. They married five years later on 25 March 1982. During their relationship, Stirling became a theatrical producer to get more involved in his wife's life. They divorced in 1990 after Archie's affair with the actress Joely Richardson. Rachael later became an actress. In 2026, Rachael wrote a biography of Diana titled All About My Mother.

Rigg had a long friendship with the American playwright and screenwriter Paddy Chayefsky. He insisted on casting her in The Hospital after seeing her in the play Abelard and Heloise. This led to rumours of a romance between them, but she denied it was ever anything but platonic. He named the character Diana in Network after her.

In a June 2015 interview with the website The A.V. Club, Rigg talked about her chemistry with Patrick Macnee on The Avengers despite their 16-year age difference: "I sort of vaguely knew Patrick Macnee, and he looked kindly on me and sort of husbanded me through the first couple of episodes. After that, we became equal, and loved each other professionally and sparked off each other. And we'd then improvise, write our own lines. They trusted us. Particularly our scenes when we were finding a dead body—I mean, another dead body. How do you get round that one? They allowed us to do it." Asked if she had stayed in touch with Macnee (the interview was published two days before Macnee's death and decades after they were reunited on her short-lived American series Diana): "You'll always be close to somebody that you worked with very intimately for so long, and you become really fond of each other. But we haven't seen each other for a very, very long time."

=== Charitable activity and beliefs ===
Rigg was a patron of International Care & Relief and was for many years the public face of the charity's child-sponsorship scheme. She was chancellor of the University of Stirling from 1997 to 2008, a ceremonial rather than executive role.

Rigg was a Christian. She regularly attended church.

=== Hobbies and habits ===
Rigg started smoking at the age of 18, and was still smoking 20 cigarettes (one pack) a day in 2009. By December 2017 she had stopped smoking after serious illness led to heart surgery, a cardiac ablation, two months earlier. She joked later, "My heart had stopped ticking during the procedure, so I was up there and the good Lord must have said, 'Send the old bag down again, I'm not having her yet!'"

Rigg was a heavy drinker, who "could drink most people under the table", according to her daughter. She would frequently have a glass of wine or champagne before a theatre performance. She also drank and smoked while pregnant with her daughter.

Rigg was a keen bridge player, tennis player, arcade gambler, tavli and scrabble player, and loved all kinds of word games. Stephen Sondheim described her as a genius at word games. She was also a keen angler and nature lover. In 1994, she published an anthology of poetry about the countryside called "So to the Land: An Anthology Of Countryside Poetry”.

=== Death ===
Rigg died at her daughter Rachael Stirling's home in London on 10 September 2020, at the age of 82. She died from lung cancer, which she had been diagnosed with in March that year. In her final weeks, she recorded tapes imploring MPs to legalise assisted dying.

== Honours ==
In 1999, Rigg was appointed as the Cameron Mackintosh Visiting professor of Contemporary Theatre at St Catherine's College, Oxford; she held the post for one year.

In 2014, Rigg received the Will Award, presented by the Shakespeare Theatre Company, along with Stacy Keach and John Hurt.

On 25 October 2015, to mark 50 years of Emma Peel, the British Film Institute screened an episode of The Avengers; this was followed by an onstage interview with Rigg about her time in the television series.

=== Commonwealth honours ===
Country	Date	Appointment	Post-nominal letters	Ref.
United Kingdom	1988	Commander of the Order of the British Empire	CBE	
United Kingdom	1994	Dame Commander of the Order of the British Empire	DBE	

=== Scholastic ===
Chancellor, visitor, governor, rector and fellowships

Location	Dates	School	Position	Ref.
Scotland	1998–2008	University of Stirling	Chancellor	
England	1999–2000	University of Oxford	Cameron Mackintosh Visiting professor of Contemporary Theatre	
England	1999–2020	St Catherine's College, Oxford	Fellow	

=== Honorary degrees ===
Location	Date	School	Degree	Ref.
Scotland	4 November 1988	University of Stirling	Doctor of the University (D.Univ)	
England	1992	University of Leeds	Doctor of Literature (D.Litt.)	
England	1995	University of Nottingham	Doctor of Literature (D.Litt.)	
England	1996	London South Bank University	Doctor of Literature (D.Litt.)	

== Credits ==
=== Theatre ===
Selected.

Year	Title	Role	Notes	Ref.
1957	The Caucasian Chalk Circle	Natella Abashwili	Theatre Royal, York Festival	
1964	King Lear	Cordelia	Royal Shakespeare Company (European/US Tour)	
1966	Twelfth Night	Viola	Royal Shakespeare Company	
1970	Abelard and Heloise	Heloise	Wyndham's Theatre, London	
1971	Abelard and Heloise	Heloise	Brooks Atkinson Theatre, New York	
1972	Macbeth	Lady Macbeth	The Old Vic Theatre, London	
1972	Jumpers	Dorothy Moore	The Old Vic Theatre, London	
1973	The Misanthrope	Célimène	The Old Vic Theatre, London	
1974	Pygmalion	Eliza Doolittle	Albery Theatre, London	
1975	The Misanthrope	Célimène	St. James Theatre, New York	
1978	Night and Day	Ruth Carson	Phoenix Theatre, London	
1982	Colette	Colette	US national tour	
1983	Heartbreak House	Lady Ariadne Utterword	Theatre Royal Haymarket, London	
1985	Little Eyolf	Rita Allmers	Lyric Theatre, Hammersmith, London	
1985	Antony and Cleopatra	Cleopatra	Chichester Festival Theatre, UK	
1986	Wildfire	Bess	Theatre Royal Bath & Phoenix Theatre, London	
1987	Follies	Phyllis Rogers Stone	Shaftesbury Theatre, London	
1990	Love Letters	Melissa	Stage Door Theatre, San Francisco	
1990	Busqueda	The Narrator	Queen's Hall, Edinburgh (Edinburgh Festival)	
1991	All for Love	Cleopatra	Almeida Theatre, London	
1992	Putting It Together		Old Fire Station Theatre, Oxford	
1992	Berlin Bertie	Rosa	Royal Court Theatre, London	
1992	Medea	Medea	Almeida Theatre, London	
1993	Medea	Medea	Wyndham's Theatre, London	
1994	Medea	Medea	Longacre Theatre, New York	
1995	Mother Courage and Her Children	Mother Courage	Royal National Theatre, London	
1996	Who's Afraid of Virginia Woolf?	Martha	Almeida Theatre & Aldwych Theatre, London	
1997	Who's Afraid of Virginia Woolf?	Martha	Almeida Theatre & Aldwych Theatre, London	
1998	Phaedra	Phaedra	Almeida at the Albery Theatre, London & BAM in Brooklyn	
1998	Britannicus	Agrippina	Almeida at the Albery Theatre, London & BAM in Brooklyn	
2001	Humble Boy	Flora Humble	Royal National Theatre, London	
2002	The Hollow Crown		International Tour: New Zealand, Australia, Stratford-upon-Avon, UK	
2004	Suddenly, Last Summer	Violet Venable	Albery Theatre, London	
2006	Honour	Honour	Wyndham's Theatre, London	
2007	All About My Mother	Huma Rojo	The Old Vic Theatre, London	
2008	The Cherry Orchard	Ranyevskaya	Chichester Festival Theatre, UK	
2009	Hay Fever	Judith Bliss	Chichester Festival Theatre, UK	
2011	Pygmalion	Mrs. Higgins	Garrick Theatre, London	
2018	My Fair Lady	Mrs. Higgins	Vivian Beaumont Theatre, New York	

=== Film ===
Year	Title	Role	Notes	Ref.
1968	Diadem aka Der Goldene Schlussel		short film shot in Germany	
1968	A Midsummer Night's Dream	Helena		
1969	Minikillers		Four short films shot in Spain	
1969	The Assassination Bureau	Sonya Winter		
1969	On Her Majesty's Secret Service	Teresa "Tracy" di Vicenzo		
1970	Julius Caesar	Portia		
1971	The Hospital	Barbara Drummond		
1973	Theatre of Blood	Edwina Lionheart		
1977	A Little Night Music	Countess Charlotte Mittelheim		
1981	The Great Muppet Caper	Lady Holiday		
1982	Evil Under the Sun	Arlena Stuart Marshall		
1987	Snow White	The Evil Queen		
1993	Genghis Cohn	Frieda von Stangel		
1994	A Good Man in Africa	Chloe Fanshawe		
1999	Parting Shots	Lisa		
2005	Heidi	Grandmamma		
2006	The Painted Veil	Mother Superior		
2015	The Honourable Rebel	Narrator		
2017	Breathe	Lady Neville		
2021	Last Night in Soho	Ms. Alexandra Collins	Posthumous release	

=== Television ===
Year	Title	Role	Notes	Ref.
1961	Ondine	Bit part	Televised stage performance, Aldwych Theatre	
1963	The Sentimental Agent	Francy Wilde	Episode "A Very Desirable Plot"	
1964	Festival	Adriana	Episode "The Comedy of Errors"	
1964	Armchair Theatre	Anita Fender	Episode "The Hothouse"	
1965	ITV Play of the Week	Bianca	Episode "Women Beware Women"	
1965–1968	The Avengers	Emma Peel	51 episodes	
1970	ITV Saturday Night Theatre	Liz Jardine	Episode "Married Alive"	
1973	The Diana Rigg Show	Diana Smythe	unaired pilot	
1973–1974	Diana	Diana Smythe	15 episodes	
1974	Affairs of the Heart	Grace Gracedew	Episode "Grace"	
1975	In This House of Brede	Philippa	TV film	
1975	The Morecambe & Wise Show	Nell Gwynne	Sketch in Christmas show	
1977	Three Piece Suite	Various	6 episodes	
1979	Oresteia	Clytemnestra	Mini-series	
1980	The Marquise	Eloise	TV film	
1981	Hedda Gabler	Hedda Gabler	TV film	
1982	Play of the Month	Rita Allmers	Episode Little Eyolf	
1982	Witness for the Prosecution	Christine Vole	TV film	
1983	King Lear	Regan	TV film	
1985	Bleak House	Lady Honoria Dedlock	Mini-series	
1986	The Worst Witch	Miss Constance Hardbroom	TV film	
1987	A Hazard of Hearts	Lady Harriet Vulcan	TV film	
1989	The Play on One	Lydia	Episode "Unexplained Laughter"	
1989	Mother Love	Helena Vesey	Mini-series; British Academy Television Award for Best Actress; Broadcast Press Guild Award for Best Actress	
1992	Mrs 'Arris Goes to Paris	Mme Colbert	TV film	
1993	Road to Avonlea	Lady Blackwell	Episode "The Disappearance"	
1993	Running Delilah	Judith	TV film	
1993	Screen Two	Baroness Frieda von Stangel	Episode "Genghis Cohn"; Nominated – CableACE Award for Best Supporting Actress in a Miniseries or Movie	
1995	Zoya	Evgenia	TV film	
1995	The Haunting of Helen Walker	Mrs Grose	TV film	
1996	The Fortunes and Misfortunes of Moll Flanders	Mrs Golightly	TV film	
1996	Samson and Delilah	Mara	TV film	
1997	Rebecca	Mrs Danvers	Mini-series; Primetime Emmy Award for Outstanding Supporting Actress in a Miniseries or a Movie	
1998	The American	Madame de Bellegarde	TV film	
1998–2000	The Mrs Bradley Mysteries	Adela Bradley	5 episodes	
2000	In the Beginning	Mature Rebeccah	TV film	
2001	Victoria & Albert	Baroness Lehzen	Mini-series; Nominated – Primetime Emmy Award for Outstanding Supporting Actress in a Miniseries or a Movie	
2003	Murder in Mind	Jill Craig	Episode "Suicide"	
2003	Charles II: The Power and the Passion	Queen Henrietta Maria	Mini-series	
2006	Extras	Herself	Episode "Daniel Radcliffe"	
2013–2017	Game of Thrones	Olenna Tyrell	18 episodes Nominated – Primetime Emmy Award for Outstanding Guest Actress in a Drama Series (2013, 2014, 2015, 2018); Nominated – Critics' Choice Television Award for Best Guest Performer in a Drama Series (2013, 2014)	
2013	Doctor Who	Mrs Winifred Gillyflower	Episode "The Crimson Horror"	
2015; 2017	Penn Zero: Part-Time Hero	Mayor Pink Panda	Voice, 3 episodes	
2015; 2017	Detectorists	Veronica	6 episodes	
2015	You, Me and the Apocalypse	Sutton	5 episodes	
2015	Professor Branestawm Returns	Lady Pagwell	TV film	
2017	Victoria	Duchess of Buccleuch	9 episodes	
2017	A Christmas Carol Goes Wrong	Herself/narrator	Christmas special	
2019	The Snail and the Whale	Narrator	short TV film	
2020	All Creatures Great and Small	Mrs Pumphrey	2 episodes	
2020	Black Narcissus	Mother Dorothea	Posthumous release	

== Awards and nominations ==
Award	Year	Category	Work	Result	Ref.
Primetime Emmy Award	1967	Outstanding Continued Performance by an Actress in a Leading Role in a Dramatic Series	The Avengers	Nominated	
Primetime Emmy Award	1968	Outstanding Continued Performance by an Actress in a Leading Role in a Dramatic Series	The Avengers	Nominated	
Primetime Emmy Award	1975	Outstanding Lead Actress in a Special Program - Drama or Comedy	In This House of Brede	Nominated	
Primetime Emmy Award	1997	Best Supporting Actress in a Miniseries or TV Movie	Rebecca	Won	
Primetime Emmy Award	2002	Best Supporting Actress in a Miniseries or TV Movie	Victoria & Albert	Nominated	
Primetime Emmy Award	2013	Outstanding Guest Actress in a Drama Series	Game of Thrones	Nominated	
Primetime Emmy Award	2014	Outstanding Guest Actress in a Drama Series	Game of Thrones	Nominated	
Primetime Emmy Award	2015	Outstanding Guest Actress in a Drama Series	Game of Thrones	Nominated	
Primetime Emmy Award	2018	Outstanding Guest Actress in a Drama Series	Game of Thrones	Nominated	
Golden Globe Award	1972	Best Supporting Actress – Motion Picture	The Hospital	Nominated	
BAFTA TV Award	1990	Best Actress	Mother Love	Won	
BAFTA TV Award	2000	Special Award	The Avengers	Honoured	
Tony Award	1971	Best Actress in a Play	Abelard and Heloise	Nominated	
Tony Award	1975	Best Actress in a Play	The Misanthrope	Nominated	
Tony Award	1994	Best Actress in a Play	Medea	Won	
Tony Award	2018	Best Featured Actress in a Musical	My Fair Lady	Nominated	
Drama Desk Award	1975	Outstanding Actress in a Play	The Misanthrope	Nominated	
Drama Desk Award	1994	Outstanding Actress in a Play	Medea	Nominated	
Drama Desk Award	2018	Outstanding Featured Actress in a Musical	My Fair Lady	Nominated	
Olivier Award	1994	Best Actress	Medea	Nominated	
Olivier Award	1996	Best Actress	Mother Courage and Her Children	Nominated	
Olivier Award	1997	Best Actress	Who's Afraid of Virginia Woolf?	Nominated	
Olivier Award	1999	Best Actress	Britannicus and Phèdre	Nominated	
Evening Standard Theatre Award	1992	Best Actress	Medea	Won	
Evening Standard Theatre Award	1996	Best Actress	Mother Courage and Her Children and Who's Afraid of Virginia Woolf?	Won	
Laurel Award	1970	Female New Face	The Assassination Bureau	10th place	
Broadcasting Press Guild Award	1990	Best Actress	Mother Love	Won	
CableACE Award	1995	Supporting Actress in a Movie or Miniseries	Screen Two (Episode: "Genghis Cohn")	Nominated	
Critics' Choice Television Award	2013	Best Guest Performer in a Drama Series	Game of Thrones	Nominated	
Critics' Choice Television Award	2014	Best Guest Performer in a Drama Series	Game of Thrones	Nominated	
Canneseries	2019	Variety Icon Award	—N/a	Won	
Detroit Film Critics Society	2021	Best Supporting Actress	Last Night in Soho	Nominated	
Alliance of Women Film Journalists	2021	Grand Dame Award for Defying Agism	—N/a	Nominated	
Saturn Awards	2022	Best Supporting Actress	Last Night in Soho	Nominated	
