= Catholic Church and theatre =

Many bishops, priests and monks strongly condemned theatrical amusements or even declared the actors to be "instruments of Satan", "a curse to the Church", and "beguiling unstable souls". The Roman Catholic Church believed theatre to cause people to "indulge themselves in amusements which its fascinations interfere with the prosecution of the serious work of daily life". Anything pleasing or appealing to the lower nature, the "sensual appetites", were considered as temptations as dictated in the Lord's Prayer ("lead us not into temptation"), which one must avoid to lead an ideal Christian life.

According to the Church, one had to eat and drink for strength, not for gluttony and drunkenness; rest and sleep to the glory of God; and not sink into indolence and sloth or become the masters, instead of the servants, of the body. The Church considered amusements to be the most dangerous temptations and the worst impulses since otherwise, many Christians would relax their ordinary strictness "for the sake of the cause", and having once obtained a "taste of the nectar, they will continue to drink it". The Church instead encouraged Christians to strive to please their neighbours for good edification rather than pleasing oneself.

Even exclusively Catholic countries were tolerant of churchgoers going to ordinary theatrical amusements, and the Church allowed the general population to patronise the theatre. Most of those countries even allowed theatres to open on Sunday evenings, when the popular plays are put on the boards. However, during Lent, the Catholic Church would dissuade or even prohibit the people from going to the theatre, and in some countries, where the civil law was controlled by the Catholic Church, the theaters were closed during Lent.

== United States ==
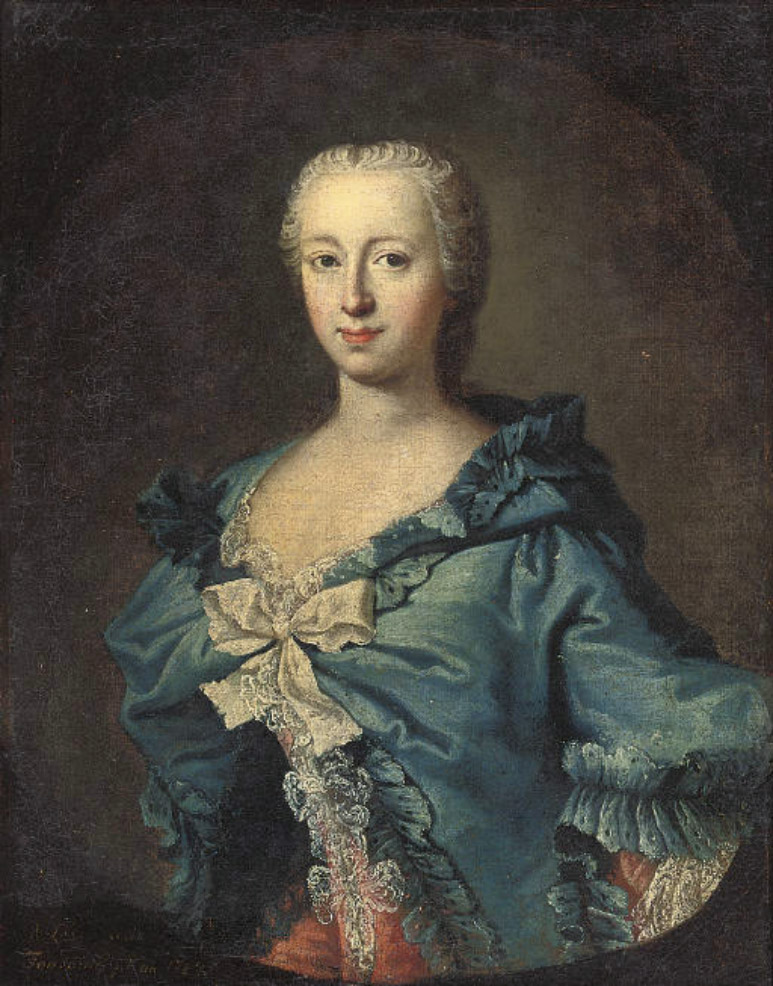
Adrienne Lecouvreur's portrait painted c. 1724; she died as an actress who was excommunicated by the Roman Catholic Church.

In the United States in the 19th century, actors endured the Church's antitheatrical attacks, which included "social humiliations, aggressive animosity toward their profession and their lowly reputation. Religious attitude toward theatre not only hampered the profession as a whole but also humiliated them as individuals which also affected their family members". In the 1860s, James H. McVicker, a theatre professional in Chicago, had seen "a child refused admittance to a school, for a reason that the parents were connected with a theatre". In the same decade, the actress Anna Cora Mowatt stated that "being an actress, people considered her and all the actresses as immoral, flighty, silly buffoons who are not to be taken seriously for a moment". That was due to the low reputation that the Roman Catholic Church had given to the theatre, which was affected financially as well because in "many areas, townspeople were scared away from viewing the performances under the Church’s influence, and the difficulty in attracting audiences resulted in inability to pay actors living wages and forced some to abandon their professions".

Travelling troupes, which performed in different cities, had experienced difficulties getting help from the locals with the tasks of "finding a place to sleep, suitable place to perform, finding carpenters to build basic set ups, and finding musicians, etc., and the lack of local help was due to religious objection". The Church also influenced greatly the producing of new actors, as many parents, worried about the low reputation of the profession, discouraged their children from pursuing the career as an actor. "Noah Ludlow had to flee home to pursue his dream in theatre which his parents disapproved of, and even much later when he got married, his wife’s family pressured him to abandon his career on stage".

== France ==
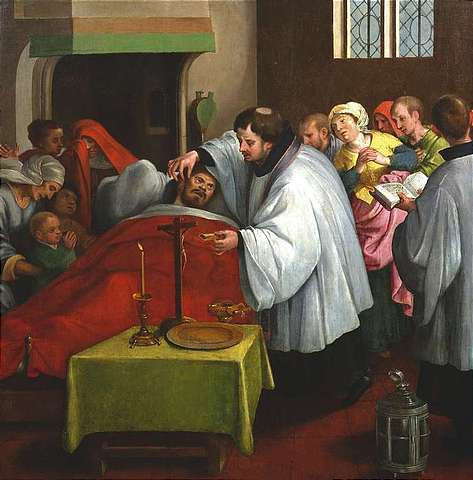
A priest giving the last rites to a sick person in deathbed.

The theatres in France had even more restrictions and limitations, as actors turned to the royal patronage for financial aid by joining the state theatre, the Comédie-Française. "The actors of this state theatre were considered as servants of the king and were expected to entertain at the court under the rules and regulations of the royal authority. Anything from assigning roles to the actors and demanding actors to be punctual on the rehearsals were strictly controlled by the royal authority. Playwrights were personally obligated to obtain official approvals from the Lieutenant-General of Police who read the manuscripts and gave approvals based on the rules revolved around the King as well as the Church and the political notables. Plays could not mock or violate Roman Catholic beliefs and ceremonies, nor it can satirize living public figures (including the monarch)".

The Catholic Church in France also condemned the theatre as a school for scandal, held all actors to be ipso facto excommunicated, and forbade their burial in consecrated ground, which included every cemetery in Paris.

Actors are paid wages by the King, and excommunicated by the Church; they are ordered by the King to play every evening, and forbidden to play at all by the ritual. If they do not play they are put in to prison [as happened when His Majesty's Players went on strike]; if they play they are [at death] cast into the sewers.

— Voltaire (Note: Will & Durant give Parton, vol. 2, p. 315 (sic, actually 325) as source; Parton gives "Epistles to Mademoiselle Clairon" as primary source)

In fact, in 1730, Adrienne Lecouvreur died at the age of 38, but she was denied a Christian burial and was hastily buried in the dead of night in an unmarked grave since the Church still banned French actors from receiving the sacraments such as marriage, baptism, or extreme unction unless they renounced their professions.

Also, the Church refused Molière's burial in the sanctified burial because he had not received the last rites with the priest present and had not renounced his profession as an actor before his death. When King Louis XIV directly intervened, the Archbishop of Paris allowed Molière to be buried only after sunset among the suicides' and paupers' graves, with no requiem masses permitted in the Church.

== Patristic views on theatre ==
Patristic views on theatre include:

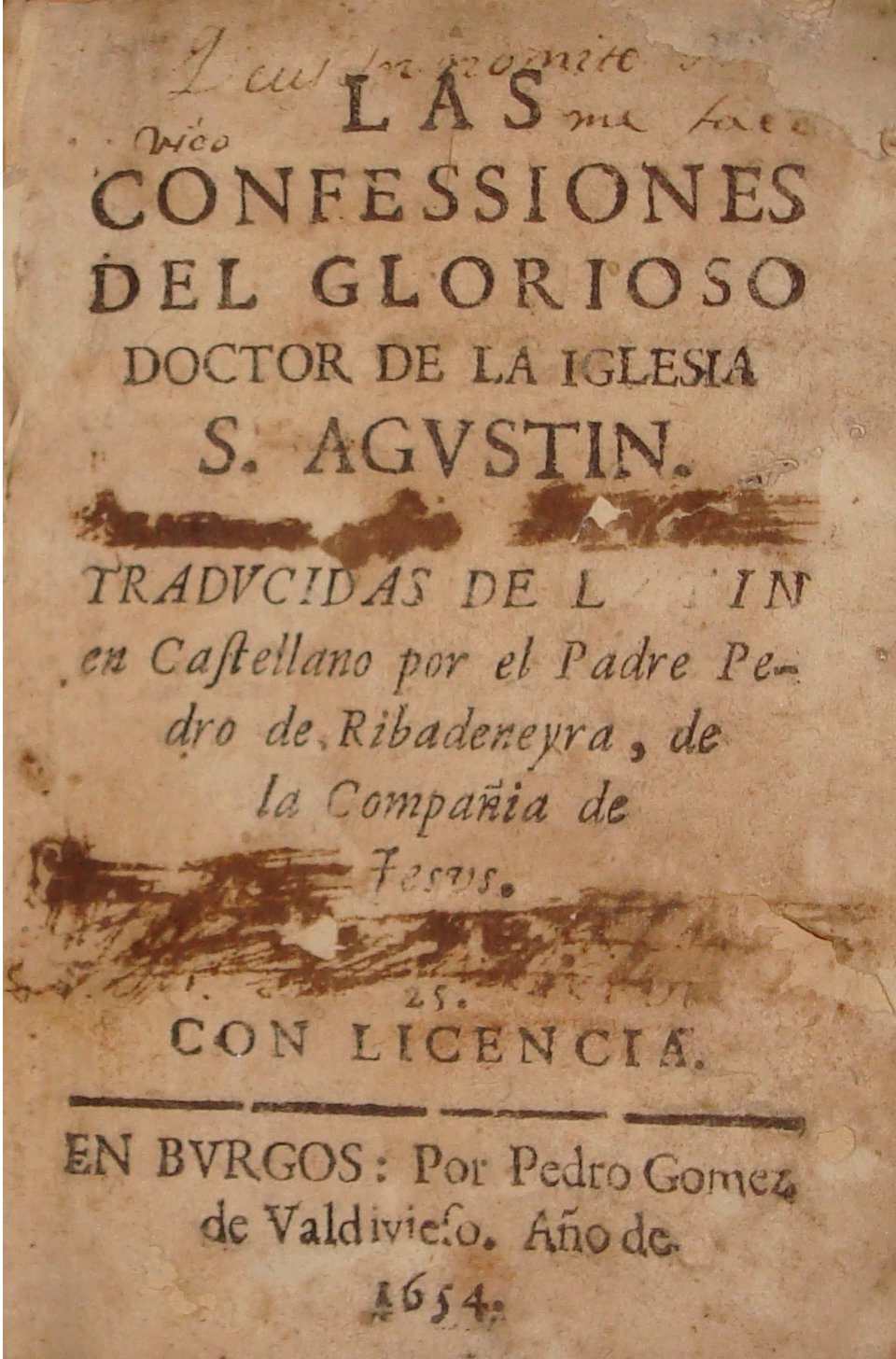
The Cover of St. Augustine's Confessions

- Clement of Alexandria (150-215 AD): dramatic compositions are nonsense and empty and would lead only to human misery. Christ is the real and eternal truth in the theatre of the universe. Christians do not serve two masters and so must maintain distant from theatre, which does not serve Christ.
- Tertullian (160-230 AD): the first Latin Church Father was against the existence of permanent theatre. He interpreted the theatre of Pompeius as the theatre as a whole; a dwelling place of the gods Venus and Liber; and a place in which idololatria (a capital crime of mankind including adultery, fraud, drunkenness, fornication and an accumulation of deadly sins) were committed. He thought theatre to belong to the pomp of the devil and that whoever went to theatre could not be an official.
- Arnobius (300 AD) and Lactantius (260-340 AD): Arnobius considered theatre to the special and favourable ground for the activity of daemons to exercise their influence on humans. Lactantius stated that with the conversion of Constantine, a Christian culture slowly began to emerge, which was manifested in art, literature and architecture, and was committing idoloatria.
- Augustine of Hippo (354-430 AD): the gods and the theatre have an origin in "deadly poison" and "crazy institution" that is rooted in demoralizstion and licentiousness and thus were dangerous influences on Roman youth. "The statues, effigies and altars of Roman theatres marked their theatres as the domain of the pagan gods, and theatre, with the rest of the pagan culture, substitutes the spiritual joy of knowing God through scripture with earthly obsessions". He discusses the theatre in his texts: Confessions, The City of God, Concerning the Teacher and On Christian Doctrine. In his Confessions, Augustine states he was attracted to theatre (the tragedies) and enjoyed the actor's performances, which gave him reasons to grieve and pity from which he gained "harmful pleasure". Theatrical performances affected only the surface of his emotion. As if he had been scratched with the poisoned fingernails, his life was filled with inflammation, swelling, putrefaction and corruption.
- Isidore of Seville (ca. 560-633 A.D.): the bishop emphasised that the wickedness of the stage should be blamed not on men but on daemons, which had initiated the theatre.

== See also ==
- Antitheatricality
