= Abigail Lawson =

English actress

Abigail Lawson was an English stage actor of the seventeenth and early eighteenth century. She was a member of the United Company, making her first known appearance in The Marriage-Hater Matched by Thomas D'Urfey in 1692. From 1695 she was part of Thomas Betterton's breakaway company at the Lincoln's Inn Fields Theatre.

== Selected roles ==
- Margery in The Marriage-Hater Matched by Thomas D'Urfey (1692)
- Mrs Dazie in The Canterbury Guests by Edward Ravenscroft (1694)
- Jenny in Love for Love by William Congreve (1695)
- Doll in She Ventures and He Wins by Ariadne (1695)
- Sprightly in The Lover's Luck by Thomas Dilke (1695)
- Nurse in The City Bride by Joseph Harris (1696)
- Beatrice in The Anatomist by Edward Ravenscroft (1696)
- Fidget in The City Lady by Thomas Dilke (1696)
- Euginia in The Innocent Mistress by Mary Pix (1697)
- Las Busque in The Intrigues at Versailles by Thomas D'Urfey (1697)
- Nibs in The Pretenders by Thomas Dilke (1698)
- Zelide in The False Friend by Mary Pix (1699)
- Lady Weepwell in The Ladies Visiting Day by William Burnaby (1701)
- Laura in Love Betrayed by William Burnaby (1703)
- Mrs Scribblescrabble in The Biter by Nicholas Rowe (1704)

== Bibliography ==
- Bush-Bailey, Gilli. Treading the bawds: Actresses and playwrights on the Late Stuart stage. Manchester University Press, 2013.
- Highfill, Philip H, Burnim, Kalman A. & Langhans, Edward A. A Biographical Dictionary of Actors, Actresses, Musicians, Dancers, Managers & Other Stage Personnel in London, 1660–1800:. SIU Press, 1984.
- Lanier, Henry Wysham. The First English Actresses: From the Initial Appearance of Women on the Stage in 1660 Till 1700. The Players, 1930.
- Van Lennep, W. The London Stage, 1660–1800: Volume One, 1660–1700. Southern Illinois University Press, 1960.
