= 1694 in literature =

This article contains information about the literary events and publications of 1694.

== Events ==
- August 24 – The Académie française publishes the first complete edition of its Dictionnaire in Paris.
- October 25 – Jonathan Swift is ordained a deacon in the Church of Ireland.
- December 28 – The death of Queen Mary II of England prompts the writing of numerous elegies.
- date unknown – Shortly before his death, Matsuo Bashō completes the writing of Oku no Hosomichi ("Narrow road to the interior"), not published until 1702.

== New books ==
=== Prose ===
- Edmund Arwaker – An Epistle to Monsieur Boileau
- Mary Astell – A Serious Proposal to the Ladies
- Thomas Pope Blount – De Re Poetica; or, Remarks upon Poetry
- Gilbert Burnet – Four Discourses
- Jeremy Collier – Miscellanies
- John Dryden and Jacob Tonson – The Annual Miscellany: for the Year 1694
- George Fox – The Journal of George Fox, edited by Thomas Ellwood
- Charles Gildon – Chorus Poetarum; or, Poems on Several Occasions (incl. Aphra Behn, John Denham, George Etheridge, Andrew Marvell, inter al.)
- William Killigrew – Mid-night and Daily Thoughts
- William King – Account of Denmark
- Jane Lead – The Enochian Walks with God
- Jan Luyken – Het Menselyk Bedryf ("The Book of Trades")
- John Milton – Letters of State (trans. Edward Phillips)
- John Strype – Memorials of Thomas Cranmer
- Matthew Tindal – An Essay Concerning the Laws of Nature and the Rights of Soveraigns
- William Wotton – Reflections upon Ancient and Modern Learning (answering Sir William Temple)
- James Wright – Country Conversations

=== Drama ===
- John Banks – The Innocent Usurper; or, The Death of the Lady Jane Grey published
- Roger Boyle, 1st Earl of Orrery – Herod the Great published
- William Congreve – The Double Dealer published
- John Crowne – The Married Beau
- John Dryden – Love Triumphant; or, Nature Will Prevail
- Thomas D'Urfey – The Comical History of Don Quixote (some songs by Henry Purcell)
- Laurence Echard, translator:
  - Plautus's Comedies: Amphytrion, Epidicus, and Rudens
  - Terence's Comedies
- Edward Ravenscroft – The Canterbury Guests
- Elkanah Settle – The Ambitious Slave
- Thomas Southerne – The Fatal Marriage (adapted from Aphra Behn's The Nun)
- Joseph Williams – Have at All, or the Midnight Adventures

=== Poetry ===
- See 1694 in poetry

== Births ==
- August 8 – Francis Hutcheson, Irish philosopher (died 1746)
- September 22 – Philip Stanhope, 4th Earl of Chesterfield, English man of letters (died 1773)
- October 9 – Marquard Herrgott, German Benedictine historian (died 1762)
- November 1 – Voltaire, French philosopher and writer (died 1778)
- December 22 – Hermann Samuel Reimarus, German philosopher (died 1768)
- probable
  - Mademoiselle Aïssé, French letter-writer (died 1733)
  - James Bramston, English satirical poet (died 1743)

== Deaths ==
- August 6 – Antoine Arnauld, French theologian and philosopher (born 1612)
- September – Henry Neville, English satirist (born 1620)
- October 13 – Samuel von Pufendorf, German philosopher and historian (born 1632)
- November 8 – Ulrik Huber, Dutch-born German political philosopher (born 1636)
- November 28 – Matsuo Bashō (松尾 芭蕉), Japanese poet (born 1644)
- December 9 – Paolo Segneri, Italian ascetic writer (born 1624)
