= George Bright (actor) =

English actor

George Bright was an English stage actor of the seventeenth and early eighteenth century. He specialised in playing "comic dullards, fops and bouncy servants". After beginning his career in Dublin he joined the Duke's Company at the Dorset Garden Theatre in 1679 and then became part of the merged United Company in 1682.

== Selected roles ==
- Ajax in Troilus and Cressida by John Dryden (1679)
- Glisten in The Revenge by Aphra Behn (1680)
- Baltazer in The False Count by Aphra Behn (1681)
- Slouch in The Royalist by Thomas D'Urfey (1682)
- Sheriff in The Duke of Guise by John Dryden (1682)
- Farmer in Dame Dobson by Edward Ravenscroft (1683)
- Martin in A Jovial Crew by Richard Brome (1683)
- Howdee in The Northern Lass by Richard Brome (1684)
- Captain Hackum in The Squire of Alsatia by Thomas Shadwell (1688)
- Dullman in The Widow Ranter by Aphra Behn (1689)
- Don Pedro in The Successful Strangers by William Mountfort (1690)
- Dullman in The English Frier by John Crowne (1690)
- Polidas in Amphitryon by John Dryden (1690)
- Cleontes in Distress'd Innocence by Elkanah Settle (1690)
- Waitwell in Sir Anthony Love by Thomas Southerne (1690)
- Sly in Edward III by William Mountfort (1690)
- Maggot in The Scowrers by Thomas Shadwell (1690)
- Old Zachary Bragg in Love for Money by Thomas D'Urfey (1691)
- Monsieur Mass in Bussy D'Ambois by Thomas D'Urfey (1691)
- Bully Bounce in Greenwich Park by William Mountfort (1691)
- Ruffle in The Wives' Excuse by Thomas Southerne (1691)
- Bias in The Marriage-Hater Matched by Thomas D'Urfey (1692)
- Sir Timothy Witless in The Female Virtuosos by Thomas Wright (1693)
- Sir Ruff Rancounter in The Maid's Last Prayer by Thomas Southerne (1693)
- Venture in A Very Good Wife by George Powell (1693)
- Sir Quibble Quere in The Richmond Heiress by Thomas D'Urfey (1693)
- Durzo in The Canterbury Guests by Edward Ravenscroft (1694)
- Sir Nicholas Purflew in The Lover's Luck by Thomas Dilke (1695)
- Justice Merryman in The City Bride by Joseph Harris (1696)
- Old Mr Gerald in The Anatomist by Edward Ravenscroft (1696)
- Grumble in The City Lady by Thomas Dilke (1696)
- Plot in Love's a Jest by Peter Motteux (1696)
- Justice of the Peace in The Provoked Wife by John Vanbrugh (1697)
- Captain Bownceby in The Pretenders by Thomas Dilke (1698)
- Clodpole in The Amorous Widow by Thomas Betterton (1699)
- Waitwell in The Way of the World by William Congreve (1700)
- Strut in The Ladies Visiting Day by William Burnaby (1701)
- Rosco in The Stolen Heiress by Susanna Centlivre (1702)
- Don Felix in The Mistake by John Vanbrugh (1705)
- Nicholas in The Maid's The Mistress by William Taverner (1708)

== Bibliography ==
- Hughes, Derek. The Theatre of Aphra Behn. Springer, 2000.
- Todd, Janet. The Works of Aphra Behn: v. 6: Complete Plays. Routledge, 2018.
