= Elizabeth Willis (actress) =

British actress

Elizabeth Willis (c.1669-1739) was a British stage actress.

She originally began appearing at Drury Lane in 1696, before joining Thomas Betterton's company at Lincoln's Inn Fields Theatre the following year. For the remainder of her career she switched between the two patent theatres and the new Queen's Theatre in the Haymarket. She also appeared at the summer fairs in London. Her daughter Mary Willis also became an actress, and the two appeared together, being billed as Mrs Willis and Miss Willis respectively.

== Selected roles ==
- Mrs Menage in The Younger Brother by Aphra Behn (1696)
- Mademoiselle in The Provoked Wife by John Vanbrugh (1697)
- Daubroy in The Intrigues at Versailles by Thomas d'Urfey (1697)
- Jenny in The Innocent Mistress by Mary Pix (1697)
- Doll in The Pretenders by Thomas Dilke (1698)
- Lady Pride in The Amorous Widow by Thomas Betterton (1699)
- Mrs Fidget in The Beau Defeated by Mary Pix (1700)
- Foible in The Way of the World by William Congreve (1700)
- Mrs Ruffly in The Ladies Visiting Day by William Burnaby (1701)
- Lady Courtall in The Different Widows by Mary Pix (1703)
- Mrs Security in The Gamester by Susanna Centlivre (1705)
- Mrs Amlet in The Confederacy by John Vanbrugh (1705)
- Mrs Dowdy in The Platonick Lady by Susanna Centlivre (1706)
- Governess in The Rival Fools by Colley Cibber (1709)
- Mrs Guiacum in The Modern Prophets by Thomas d'Urfey (1709)
- Old Woman in The City Ramble by Elkanah Settle (1711)
- Joan in The Cobbler of Preston by Charles Johnson (1716)
- Prue in Three Hours After Marriage by John Gay (1717)
- Housekeeper in The Younger Brother by Anonymous (1719)
- Abigal in The Impertinent Lovers by Francis Hawling (1723)

== Bibliography ==
- Highfill, Philip H, Burnim, Kalman A. & Langhans, Edward A. A Biographical Dictionary of Actors, Actresses, Musicians, Dancers, Managers, and Other Stage Personnel in London, 1660-1800: Garrick to Gyngell. SIU Press, 1978.
- Straub, Kristina, G. Anderson, Misty and O'Quinn, Daniel . The Routledge Anthology of Restoration and Eighteenth-Century Drama. Taylor & Francis, 2017.
