= Lucretia Bradshaw =

English actress

Lucretia Bradshaw (fl. 1714 - 1741) was an English actress. She was often billed as Mrs. Bradshaw.

In Thomas Betterton's 1741 A History of the English Stage, it is stated that:

It was the Opinion of a very good Judge of Dramatical Performers that another Gentlewoman, now living, was one of the greatest, and most promising Genii of her Time. This was Mrs. Bradshaw ...

She declared herself to have learned from Elizabeth Barry: "to make herself Mistress of her Part and leave the Figure and Action to Nature".

In 1710 she appeared in the title role in Aaron Hill's play Elfrid.

In 1714 she married Martin Folkes (1690-1754), an English antiquary, numismatist, mathematician, and astronomer, who "[took her] off the Stage, for her exemplary and prudent Conduct". The wedding took place on 18 September 1714 at St Helen's church, London. Their marriage is described by Betterton in the words: "And such has been her Behaviour to him, that there is not a more happy Couple." They had three children: Dorothy (born 1718), Martin (1720-1740), and Lucretia (1721–1758, who married Richard Betenson).

In March 1733 the family went on a tour of Germany and Italy, and in Rome she reportedly "grew religiously mad". On her return to London in 1735 she was confined to a lunatic asylum in Chelsea, and died there in 1755. Her husband, on his death in 1754, had left her an annuity of £400 for life.

Betterton's book devotes a chapter to "Some account of Mrs Guyn, Mrs Porter, Mrs Bradshaw", being Nell Gwyn, Mary Porter, and Lucretia Bradshaw.

== Selected roles ==
- Sylvia in The Double Gallant by Colley Cibber (1707)
- Mrs Gripe in The Woman Captain by Thomas Shadwell (1710)
- Arabella Zeal in The Fair Quaker of Deal by Charles Shadwell (1710)
- Elfrid in Elfrid by Aaron Hill (1710)
- Viola in The City Ramble by Elkanah Settle (1711)
