= The Canterbury Guests =

1694 comedy play

- Original language: English
- Written by: Edward Ravenscroft
- Genre: Restoration Comedy

Premiere
- Date: September 1694
- Place: Theatre Royal, Drury Lane, London

The Canterbury Guests; or, A Bargain Broken is a 1694 comedy play by the English writer Edward Ravenscroft. It was the only new work performed by the United Company that autumn, amidst tensions that eventually led to a split.

The original cast included Cave Underhill as Sir Barnaby Buffler, William Bowen as Justice Greedy, John Verbruggen as Lovell, George Powell as Carless, Thomas Dogget as Dash, William Pinkethman as Jack Sawce, Thomas Kent as Toby, George Bright as Durzo, Jane Rogers as Jacinta, Susanna Verbruggen as Hillaria, Abigail Lawson as Mrs Dazie, Frances Maria Knight as Arabella and Mary Kent as Mrs Breeder. The incidental music was composed by Henry Purcell.

== Bibliography ==
- Price, Curtis A. Henry Purcell and the London Stage. Cambridge University Press, 1984.
