= The Ladies Visiting Day =

1701 comedy play by William Burnaby

- Original language: English
- Written by: William Burnaby
- Genre: Comedy

Premiere
- Date: January 1701
- Place: Lincoln's Inn Fields Theatre

The Ladies Visiting Day is a 1701 comedy play by the English writer William Burnaby.

The original Lincoln's Inn Fields cast included Thomas Betterton as Courtine, John Verbruggen as Polidore, Thomas Doggett as Sir Testy Dolt, George Pack as Ned, George Bright as Strut, John Bowman as Saunter, Francis Leigh as Sir Thrifty Gripe, Elizabeth Barry as Lady Lovetoy, Anne Bracegirdle as Fulvia, Elizabeth Bowman as Lady Dolt, Elinor Leigh as Lady Autumn, Abigail Lawson as Lady Weepwell, Elizabeth Willis as Mrs Ruffly and Mary Porter as Lettice.

== Bibliography ==
- Burling, William J. A Checklist of New Plays and Entertainments on the London Stage, 1700-1737. Fairleigh Dickinson Univ Press, 1992.
- Nicoll, Allardyce. A History of Early Eighteenth Century Drama: 1700-1750. CUP Archive, 1927.
