= The Fatal Marriage =

1694 play

- Original language: English
- Written by: Thomas Southerne
- Genre: Tragicomedy

Premiere
- Date: February 1694
- Place: Theatre Royal, Drury Lane, London

The Fatal Marriage; Or, The Innocent Adultery is a 1694 tragicomedy by the Anglo-Irish writer Thomas Southerne. It was part of the tradition of She-tragedy which flourished at the time. Incidental music for the work was composed by Henry Purcell.

It was originally performed by the United Company at the Theatre Royal, Drury Lane featuring a cast that included Edward Kynaston as Count Baldwin, Joseph Williams as Biron, George Powell as Carlos, Thomas Betterton as Villeroy, John Verbruggen as Frederick, Thomas Doggett as Fernando, William Bowen as Jaqueline, Cave Underhill as Sampson, Joseph Harris as Bellford, John Freeman as Pedro, Elizabeth Barry as Isabella, Frances Maria Knight as Julia, Anne Bracegirdle as Villeria and Elinor Leigh as Nurse.

A popular hit it was revived numerous times with many leading actresses playing the part of Isabella. In 1758 David Garrick adapted it for his play Isabella which became a signature role for Sarah Siddons.

== Bibliography ==
- Van Lennep, W. The London Stage, 1660-1800: Volume One, 1660-1700. Southern Illinois University Press, 1960.
