= Richard Crosse =

Richard Crosse may refer to:

- Richard Crosse (painter)
- Richard Crosse (British Army officer)
- Richard Crosse (priest)

== See also ==
- Richard Cross (disambiguation)
