= William Corbett (composer) =

English composer (1680–1748)

William Corbett (18 June 1680 – 7 March 1748) was an English composer, violinist, and concert performer. The Director of New Theatre (Lincoln's Inn Fields, London) from 1700, Corbett was appointed orchestra director of King's Theatre, The Haymarket in 1705 and became a member of the Royal Orchestra in 1709.

In 1716, he was appointed Director of the King's Band. From 1715 to 1726, Corbett lived in Italy, returning to London in 1727. It has been speculated that while abroad, Corbett was possibly acting as an agent for the Crown.

== Extant works ==
- Henry VI by Betterton (1699)
- Twelve Sonatas a tre for 2 violins and b.c op. 1 (1700)
- As You Find It (1703)
- Love Betray'd, or The Agreeable Disappointment (1703)
- The Instrumental Musick for January, February and March, for 2 flutes and b.c (1703)
- Six Sonatas for 2 flutes and b.c op. 2 (1705)
- British Enchanters, or No Magick Like Love (1706)
- Six Sonatas a 3 for Two Flutes or German Flutes and a Bass. Consisting of Preludes, Allemands, Corants, Sarabands, Gavots & Jiggs. Dedicated to ye ... Earle of Portland ... Opera Quarta. Libro Primo. [Separate Parts.] [London] : L. Pippard, for ye Author, [1712.] A copy is in the British Library: music collections h.50.(1).
- Six Sonatas a 3 for two Violins & Thro'-bass for the Spinet or Harpsicord. Consisting of preludes, allemands, corants, sarabands, gavots and jiggs ... Opera quarta. Libro secondo. [Parts.] London : L. Pippard for the author, [1712]. An incomplete copy of the score is in the British Library: music collections h.50.(2)
- Concerto No. 7 "Alla Portugesa" in B-Flat Major, Op. 7
- Le Bizzarie Universali in Four Parts op. 8 (1728)
- Le Bizzarie Universali in Seven Parts (Concerti Grossi) (1742)
