= The City Lady =

1696 play

- Original language: English
- Written by: Thomas Dilke
- Genre: Comedy

Premiere
- Date: December 1696
- Place: Lincoln's Inn Fields Theatre, London

The City Lady; Or, Folly Reclaim'd is a 1696 comedy play by the English writer Thomas Dilke. It was staged by Thomas Betterton's Company at the Lincoln's Inn Fields Theatre with a cast that included George Bright as Grumble, Cave Underhill as Bevis, John Bowman as Bellardin, John Hodgson as Lovebright, Joseph Harris as Pedanty, John Freeman as Burgersditius, William Bowen as Jasper, Elizabeth Barry as Lady Grumble, Elizabeth Bowman as Lucinda, Elinor Leigh as Secreta and Abigail Lawson as Fidget.

== Bibliography ==
- Lowerre, Kathryn. The Lively Arts of the London Stage, 1675–1725. Routledge, 2016.
- Van Lennep, W. The London Stage, 1660-1800: Volume One, 1660-1700. Southern Illinois University Press, 1960.
