= The Squire of Alsatia =

1688 play

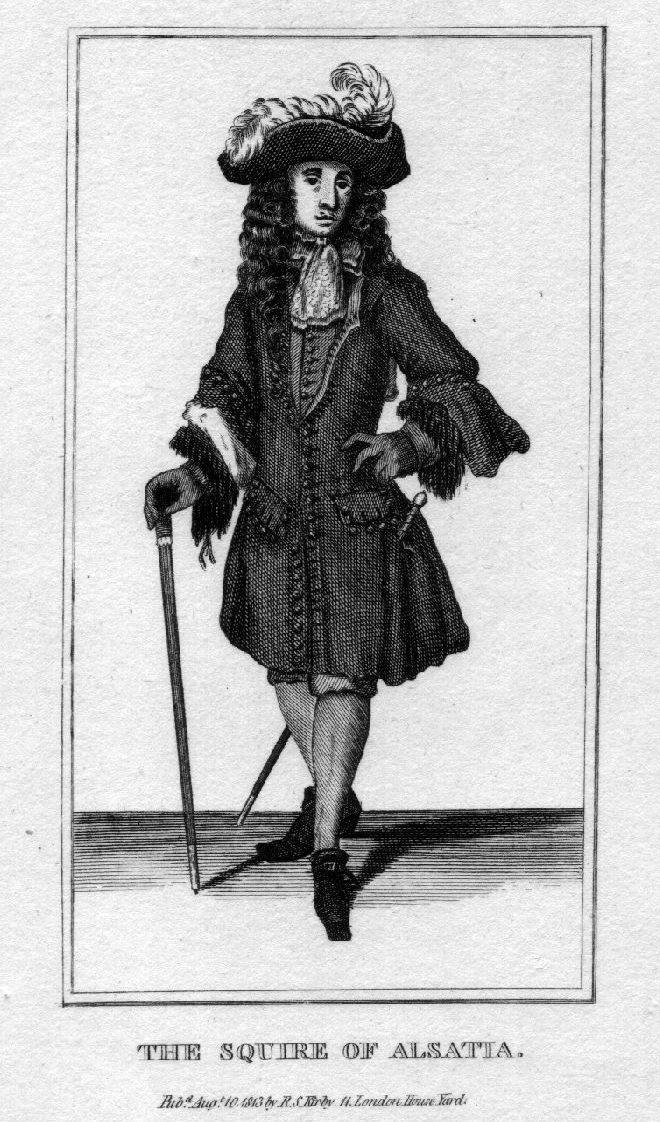
- Original language: English
- Written by: Thomas Shadwell
- Genre: Restoration comedy

Premiere
- Date: 3 May 1688
- Place: Theatre Royal, Drury Lane

The Squire of Alsatia is a 1688 comedy play by the English writer Thomas Shadwell. Alsatia was a nickname for the Whitefriars area of London, deriving from Alsace in northeastern France. A restoration comedy, it was performed at the Drury Lane Theatre by the United Company following John Crowne's Darius, King of Persia. One of the best-remembered roles, that of the shrewish Mrs. Termagant was first performed by Elizabeth Boutell. The play was revived numerous times during the eighteenth century.

The original Drury Lane cast included Anthony Leigh as Sir William Belfond, Philip Griffin as Sir Edward Belfond, Thomas Jevon as Belford senior, William Mountfort as Belfont junior, John Bowman as Trueman, Samuel Sandford as Cheatly, George Powell as Shamwell, George Bright as Captain Hackum, Martin Powell as Attorney, John Freeman as Scrapeall, Cave Underhill as Lolpoop, John Verbruggen as Termagant, Frances Maria Knight as Teresia, Susanna Verbruggen as Isabella, Anne Bracegirdle as Lucia and Elizabeth Boutell as Mrs. Termagant.

== Bibliography ==
- Duckworth, George E. Nature of Roman Comedy: A Study in Popular Entertainment. Princeton University Press, 2015
- Van Lennep, W. The London Stage, 1660-1800: Volume One, 1660-1700. Southern Illinois University Press, 1960.
