= Mary Willis =

British actress

Mary Willis was a British stage actress of the eighteenth century.

She was the daughter of the actress Elizabeth Willis and sometimes appeared alongside her billed as Miss Willis. Like her mother she spent a number of years in the company at the Drury Lane Theatre but also appeared at the Haymarket Theatre and Lincoln's Inn Fields. Debuting as a child actor in 1701, she mainly appeared in revivals but occasionally acted in new plays. Her last known stage appearance was in York in 1734 when she played Selima in Nicholas Rowe's Tamerlane.

== Selected roles ==
- Manselia in Love's Victim by Charles Gildon (1701)
- Angelina in Love Makes a Man by Colley Cibber (1709)
- Grace in Bartholomew Fair by Ben Jonson (1710)
- Peggy in The London Cuckolds by Edward Ravenscroft (1710)
- Alinda in The Pilgrim by John Fletcher (1710)
- Mrs Christian in Sir Martin Marall by John Dryden (1710)
- Franchibel in The Villain by Thomas Porter (1711)
- Winifred in The Volunteers by Thomas Shadwell (1711)
- Christina in Love's a Jest by Peter Motteux (1711)
- Silvia in Madame Fickle by Thomas D'Urfey (1711)
- Teraminta in The Wife's Relief by Charles Johnson (1711)
- Mopsa in The Petticoat Ploter by Newburgh Hamilton (1712)
- Leanthe in Love and a Bottle by George Farquhar (1712)
- Philadelphia in The Amorous Widow by Thomas Betterton (1713)
- Frances in The Puritan by Thomas Middleton (1714)
- Mrs Squeamish in The Country Wife by William Wycherley (1715)
- Eboli in Don Carlos, Prince of Spain by Thomas Otway (1715)
- Arethusa in The Contrivances by Henry Carey (1715)
- Betty in The Cobbler of Preston by Charles Johnson (1716)
- Miranda in The Tempest by William Shakespeare (1717)
- Biddy in The Old Troop by John Lacy (1717)
- Mincing in The Way of the World by William Congreve (1718)
- Fainlove in The Tender Husband by Richard Steele (1718)
- Violante in Greenwich Park by William Mountfort (1718)
- Ophelia in Hamlet by William Shakespeare (1719)
- Araminta in The Confederacy by John Vanbrugh (1719)
- Fidelia in Love in a Veil by Richard Savage (1719)
- Isabella in 'Tis Well if it Takes by William Taverner (1723)

== Bibliography ==
- Highfill, Philip H, Burnim, Kalman A. & Langhans, Edward A. A Biographical Dictionary of Actors, Actresses, Musicians, Dancers, Managers, and Other Stage Personnel in London, 1660–1800: West to Zwingman. SIU Press, 1978.
