= The Pretenders (1698 play) =

1698 play

- Original language: English
- Written by: Thomas Dilke
- Genre: Comedy

Premiere
- Date: March 1698
- Place: Lincoln's Inn Fields Theatre, London

The Pretenders; Or, The Town Unmask'd is a 1698 comedy play by the English writer Thomas Dilke. It was first staged by Thomas Betterton's company at the Lincoln's Inn Fields Theatre with a cast that included John Thurmond as Lord Courtipell, Cave Underhill as Sir Wealthy Plainder, Edward Kynaston as Sir Bellamour Blunt, John Bowman as Vainthroat, George Bright as Captain Bownceby, William Bowen as Nickycrack, Elizabeth Bowman as Ophelia, Elinor Leigh as Sweetny, Abigail Lawson as Nibs and Elizabeth Willis as Doll.

== Bibliography ==
- Van Lennep, W. The London Stage, 1660-1800: Volume One, 1660-1700. Southern Illinois University Press, 1960.
