= Richard Cross =

Richard Cross is the name of:

== Politicians ==
- Richard Cross (died c. 1438), MP for Reading (UK Parliament constituency)
- R. A. Cross, 1st Viscount Cross (1823–1914), British statesman and Conservative politician

== Others ==
- Richard Cross (actor) (fl. 1700–1724), British stage actor
- Richard Cross (actor, died 1760) (fl. 1729–1760), British stage actor, probable son of the above
- Richard Cross (bass-baritone) (born 1935), American opera singer
- Richard Cross (photojournalist) (1950–1983), American photojournalist
- Richard Alan Cross, English theologian, expert on Duns Scotus
- Richard Assheton Cross, 2nd Viscount Cross (1882–1932), British peer and civil servant
- Richard E. Cross (1910–1996), American lawyer and executive in the automotive industry
- Richard James Cross (1845–1917), English born banker who was prominent in New York society
- Richard Cross (Murder One), character portrayed by Stanley Tucci in the TV series Murder One

== See also ==
- Dick Cross Wildlife Management Area, protected area in Virginia, United States
