= The Loving Enemies =

1680 play

- Original language: English
- Written by: Lewis Maidwell
- Genre: Restoration comedy

Premiere
- Date: January 1680
- Place: Dorset Garden Theatre, London

The Loving Enemies is a 1680 comedy play by the English writer Lewis Maidwell. It was first staged by the Duke's Company at the Dorset Garden Theatre in London.

The original cast included Thomas Betterton as Lorenzo, William Smith as Marcello, Joseph Williams as Antonio, Anthony Leigh as Paulo, Cave Underhill as Circumstantio, John Richards as Albricio, Mary Lee as Julia, Elizabeth Barry as Camilla, Anne Shadwell as Lucinda and Elinor Leigh as Paulina. It was dedicated to Charles Fox, son of the politician Stephen Fox, who Maidwell had been a tutor to.

== Bibliography ==
- Van Lennep, W. The London Stage, 1660-1800: Volume One, 1660-1700. Southern Illinois University Press, 1960.
