= Love Betrayed =

1703 comedy play by William Burnaby

- Written by: William Burnaby
- Original language: English
- Genre: Comedy

Premiere
- Date premiered: January 1703
- Place premiered: Lincoln's Inn Fields Theatre

Love Betrayed is a 1703 comedy play by the English writer William Burnaby. It is also known by the longer title Love Betray'd; Or, The Agreeable Disappointment. It was a reworking of Shakespeare's Twelfth Night.

The original cast included John Verbruggen as Moreno, George Powell as Drances, Barton Booth as Sebastian, Thomas Doggett as Taquilet, George Pack as Pedro, William Fieldhouse as Rodoregue, Elizabeth Barry as Villaretta, Abigail Lawson as Laura, Elinor Leigh as Dromia and Anne Bracegirdle as Caesario.

== Bibliography ==
- Burling, William J. A Checklist of New Plays and Entertainments on the London Stage, 1700-1737. Fairleigh Dickinson Univ Press, 1992.
- Dobson, Michael. The Making of the National Poet : Shakespeare, Adaptation and Authorship, 1660-1769: Shakespeare, Adaptation and Authorship, 1660-1769. Clarendon Press, 1992.
- Nicoll, Allardyce. A History of Early Eighteenth Century Drama: 1700-1750. CUP Archive, 1927.
