= Greenwich Park (play) =

1691 play

- Original language: English
- Written by: William Mountfort
- Genre: Restoration Comedy

Premiere
- Date: April 1691
- Place: Theatre Royal, Drury Lane, London

Greenwich Park is a 1691 comedy play by the English writer William Mountfort.

The original cast included Anthony Leigh as Sir Thomas Reveller, James Nokes as Raison, Cave Underhill as Sasaphras, John Hodgson as Lord Worthy, William Mountfort as Young Reveller, William Bowen as Thoughtless John Bowman as Beau, George Bright as Bully Bounce, Elizabeth Barry as Dorinda, Susanna Mountfort as Florella, Margaret Osborne as Lady Hazard, Katherine Corey as Aunt to Dorinda and Frances Maria Knight as Mrs Raison.

== Bibliography ==
- Van Lennep, W. The London Stage, 1660-1800: Volume One, 1660-1700. Southern Illinois University Press, 1960 .
