= The Successful Strangers =

- Original language: English
- Written by: William Mountfort
- Genre: Tragicomedy

Premiere
- Date: January 1690
- Place: Theatre Royal, Drury Lane, London

The Successful Strangers is a 1690 tragicomedy by the English writer William Mountfort.

The original Drury Lane cast included Joseph Williams as Don Carlos, George Powell as Antonio, William Mountfort as Silvio, James Nokes as Don Lopez, Anthony Leigh as Don Francisco, George Bright as Don Pedro, Cave Underhill as Guzman, William Bowen as Sancho, Frances Maria Knight as Dorothea, Susanna Mountfort as Feliciana and Anne Bracegirdle as Biancha.

== Bibliography ==
- Van Lennep, W. The London Stage, 1660-1800: Volume One, 1660-1700. Southern Illinois University Press, 1960 .
- Watson, George. The New Cambridge Bibliography of English Literature: Volume 2, 1660-1800. Cambridge University Press, 1971.
