= The Married Beau =

1694 play

- Original language: English
- Written by: John Crowne
- Genre: Restoration Comedy

Premiere
- Date: April 1694
- Place: Theatre Royal, Drury Lane, London

The Married Beau or The Curious Impertinent is a 1694 comedy play by the English writer John Crowne. It is inspired by a passage from Miguel de Cervantes's Don Quixote. Incidental music was composed by Henry Purcell.

It was first staged by the United Company in London. The original Drury Lane cast featured George Powell as Loveley, Thomas Betterton as Polidor, Thomas Doggett as Thorneback, William Bowen as Sir John, Elizabeth Barry as Mrs Loveley, Elizabeth Bowman as Cecilia, Anne Bracegirdle as Camilla and Susanna Verbruggen as Lionell. The published version was dedicated to the Tory politician the Marquess of Normanby.

== Bibliography ==
- Van Lennep, W. The London Stage, 1660-1800: Volume One, 1660-1700. Southern Illinois University Press, 1960.
- White, Arthur Franklin. John Crowne: His Life and Dramatic Works. Routledge, 2019.
