= Bussy D'Ambois (1691 play) =

1691 play

- Written by: Thomas D'Urfey
- Original language: English
- Genre: Tragedy
- Setting: France, 16th century

Premiere
- Date premiered: March 1691
- Place premiered: Theatre Royal, Drury Lane, London

Bussy D'Ambois; Or, The Husbands Revenge is a 1691 tragedy by the English writer Thomas D'Urfey. It was first staged by the United Company at the Theatre Royal, Drury Lane in London. It is inspired by the earlier play of the same title by George Chapman, based on the real Louis de Bussy d'Amboise.

The original cast included John Freeman as Henry III of France, John Hodgson as Monsieur, Edward Kynaston as Duke of Guise, William Mountfort as D'Ambois, George Powell as Montfurry, George Bright as Monsieur Masse, William Bowen as Monsieur Lassoil, John Verbruggen as Bariser, Joseph Harris as Lanoo, Anne Bracegirdle as Tamira and Katherine Corey as Teresia. The published play was dedicated to the Earl of Carlisle, a Whig politician.

== Plot ==
=== Act I ===
Tamira has been forced by her parents to marry the wealthy Montfurry, despite her love for the Bussy D'Ambois. Teresia, Tamira's governess, preaches the virtues of temperance, but Tamira feels unable to heed her advice as she has an intense desire to give herself to D'Ambois. Tamira tells Teresia to give the impoverished D'Ambois, who being heartbroken, now spends a life in solitude, a purse of money, in part because he spent much of his expenses on gifts for Tamira during their courtship. Tamira also asks that Teresia tell D'Ambois of her esteem for him. Teresia agrees to do so, as charity. Tamira then enjoins Teresia to lead D'Ambois to a secret chamber in her apartments; Tamira plans to explain to D'Ambois that she married Montfurry against her will. Teresia, once again, gives her friend her approval and her assent.

In a solitary grove, a bedraggled D'Ambois expounds the meaningless of pomp and status and the importance of virtue. He is soon joined by the king's brother (known only as "Monsieur") and his page. The gentleman plans to revolt against the King of France, and take his place on throne. He has followed D'Ambois with the intention of using him as muscle in his bid for the throne, thinking D'Ambois will be sufficiently motivated by poverty to aid him. Monsieur flatters D'Ambois, encouraging him to become part of courtly life. D'Ambois, seeing through his manipulation, refuses his offers. The gentleman leaves, but promises to send D'Ambois a gift. Although D'Ambois suspects that Monsieur will try to tempt him with money, he remains loyal to the king. Monsieur Masse, steward to Monsieur, enters, with instructions to give D'Ambois one thousand crowns. D'Ambois insults Masse, who then decides to save 900 crowns for his wife and give 100 to D'Ambois. D'Ambois perceives that Masse is cheating him out of money, and says as much. The two continue to exchange insults before D'Ambois pulls on his nose and spins him around. D'Ambois' behavior sufficiently intimidates Masse into handing D'Ambois the money. D'Ambois then physically assaults Masse and leaves. Masse, embarrassed by the incident, resolves to keep it a secret.

=== Act II ===
At court, Tamira tells her maid, Charlotte, of her surprise and excitement at the news that the gentleman, referred to only as "Monsieur", has brought D'Ambois to court. Tamira hopes that Teresia will fulfill her promise. The two are then joined by King Henry III, the Duke of Guise, and an array of followers and attendants. Brissac, who numbers among the retinue, suspects that the newly gained peace between the King and the Duke is sure to be temporary. The King expresses his disapproval of the decadent French court, comparing it unfavorably to that of England. The Duke of Guise disagrees, and two clash. Suddenly, Mellinel spots Monsieur approach, along with the Bussy D'Ambois. The King sings D'Ambois' praises and commiserates with Monsieur as Teresia furtively approaches D'Ambois.

== Bibliography ==
- Nicoll, Allardyce. History of English Drama, 1660-1900: Volume 1, Restoration Drama, 1660-1700. Cambridge University Press, 1952.
- Van Lennep, W. The London Stage, 1660-1800: Volume One, 1660-1700. Southern Illinois University Press, 1960.
