= Zara (play) =

1736 play

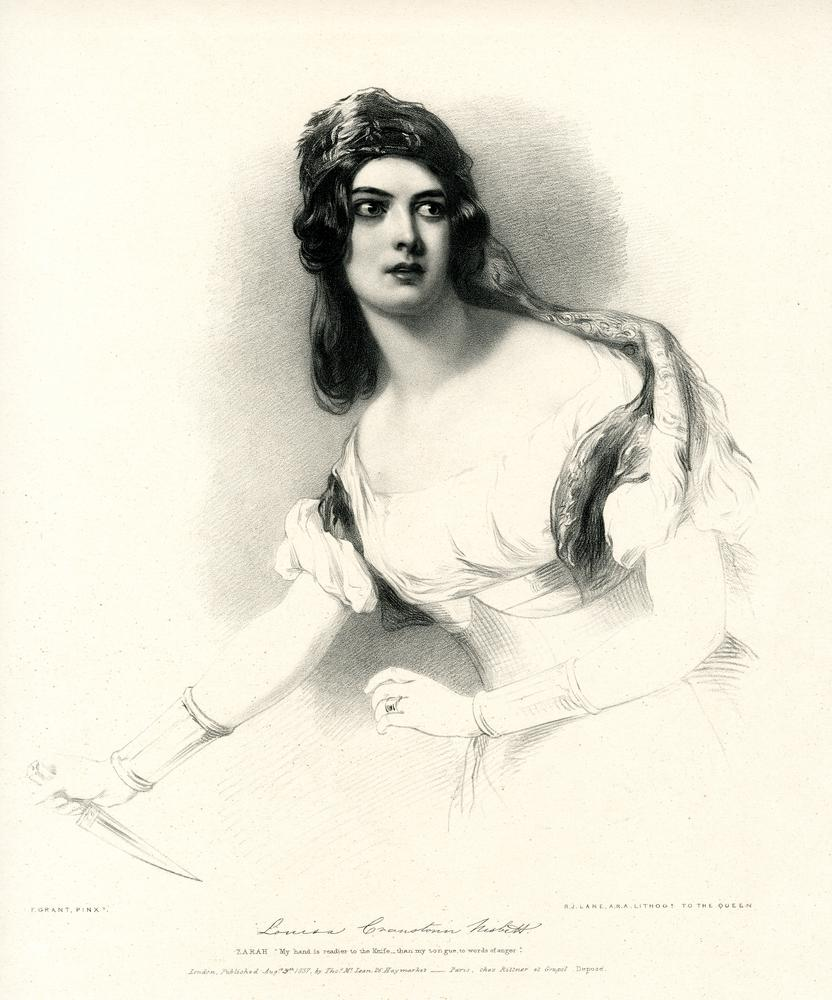
- Louisa Cranstoun Nisbett as Zara
- Original language: English
- Written by: Aaron Hill
- Genre: Tragedy

Premiere
- Date: 12 January 1736
- Place: Theatre Royal, Drury Lane

Zara is a 1736 tragedy by the British writer Aaron Hill, based on the 1732 French play Zaïre by Voltaire. As in Voltaire's original, Hill's play, set during the Crusades, tells the story of Zara, a Christian slave.

The original Drury Lane cast included Susannah Maria Cibber as Zara, William Milward as Lusignan, Theophilus Cibber as Nerestan, Edward Berry as Chatillon, Richard Cross as Melidor and Hannah Pritchard as Selima. The incidental music was composed by Thomas Arne.

== Bibliography ==
- Burling, William J. A Checklist of New Plays and Entertainments on the London Stage, 1700-1737. Fairleigh Dickinson Univ Press, 1992.
- Gerrard, Christine. Aaron Hill: The Muses' Projector, 1685-1750. Oxford University Press, 2003.
- Nicoll, Allardyce. A History of Early Eighteenth Century Drama: 1700-1750. CUP Archive, 1927.
