= The Innocent Mistress =

The Innocent Mistress is a comedy written by Mary Pix, first performed in 1697.

== Plot ==
Sir Charles, a younger son with no estate, is unhappily married to the wealthier, older and "ill-bred" Lady Beauclair. Lady Beauclair is supposedly a widow, and like her daughter Peggy, is “an ill-bred woman”. Their marriage has not been consummated. He instead falls in love with his niece's friend 'Bellinda', whose real name is in fact Marianne. She is in hiding after escaping a forced marriage, and although she loves Sir Charles, she refuses to become his mistress. At the end of the play it is revealed that Lady Beauclair's first husband, Mr Flywife, is alive and back to London after several years in Jamaica. Sir Charles' marriage to Lady Beauclair is legally invalid, so he and 'Bellinda' are free to marry.

Sir Charles' niece Mrs. Beauclair, 'an independent woman', attempts to reform Sir Francis Wildlove from his initial rakishness. Wildlove finally changes his attitude and reveals his true feelings for Mrs Beauclair when he mistakenly thinks she has married another man.

Several other courtships take place during the play. Arabella is a wealthy young woman whose fortune and person are controlled by Lady Beauclair and her brother Cheatall. With the help of Lady Beauclair's clever servant Eugenia, she is able to marry her suitor Beaumont, 'an honest country gentleman'. Eugenia marries her fellow servant, Gentil. Finally, the social parasite Mr Spendall tricks Peggy into believing he is rich, and they also marry. For their part, Lady Beauclair and Mr Flywife now have to pay for their mistakes by living together again.

== Performance history ==
The play was first performed in 1697 at Little Lincoln's Inn Fields. The cast included Thomas Betterton as Sir Charles Beauclair, John Verbruggen as Sir Francis Wildlove, John Hodgson as Beaumont, John Bowman as Spendall, John Freeman as Lyonell, William Bowen as Cheatall, Joseph Harris as Gentil, Cave Underhill as Flywife, Elizabeth Barry as Bellinda, Anne Bracegirdle as Mrs Beauclair, Elinor Leigh as Lady Beauclair and Abigail Lawson as Euginia.

== Reception ==
The Innocent Mistress was popular with audiences when released.

Jose Yebra suggests that the play mirrors contemporary 'anxieties and fears in view of the overall change undergone by the English society in late seventeenth century... Once the Carolean sexual libertinism abated, the Augustan stage became more reactionary and morally repressive. However, The Innocent Mistress is rather ambiguous in this respect. It combines the conservative traits patriarchal Augustan theatre demanded from female writers with Pix’s pro-female discourse that contests, albeit timidly, women’s discrimination.
