= Richard Cross (actor, died 1760) =

British stage actor (??–1760)

Richard Cross (died 1760) was a British stage actor.

He was likely to have been the son of the actor Richard Cross who appeared in London in the early eighteenth century. The younger Cross possibly made his first recorded performance at the Haymarket Theatre in November 1729, and also appeared at some of the summer fairs in London. From 1731 he was also appearing in small roles at Drury Lane. By 1733 he was an established member of the Drury Lane company, involved in the Actor Rebellion of 1733. In early 1735 he became associated with the actress Frances Shireburn, who was thereafter billed as Mrs Cross, although a formal marriage ceremony didn't take place until 1751.

Frustrated by his low pay at Drury Lane, he switched to the rival Covent Garden Theatre in 1739 but did not earn much more. He also began working as prompter there. He returned to Drury Lane in 1741 and remained there until his death nineteen years later. He continued to act as prompter, although he also played leading roles. During the summers he appeared at Richmond Theatre, and also wrote a novel and a play The Henpecked Captain which was staged at Drury Lane in 1749 during a benefit performance for him.

He died on 20 February 1760 and was buried at St Paul's, Covent Garden. His son, also named Richard Cross also became an actor, appearing alongside his father at Drury Lane after 1748 billed as Master Cross.

== Selected roles ==
- Poverty in The Blazing Comet by Samuel Johnson (1732)
- Lewis in The Man of Taste by James Miller (1735)
- Melidor in Zara by Aaron Hill (1736)
- William in The Connoisseur by Anonymous (1736)

== Bibliography ==
- Highfill, Philip H, Burnim, Kalman A. & Langhans, Edward A. A Biographical Dictionary of Actors, Actresses, Musicians, Dancers, Managers, and Other Stage Personnel in London, 1660–1800. SIU Press, 1973.
