= Richard Cross (actor) =

British stage actor

Richard Cross was a British stage actor of the seventeenth and eighteenth century.

It is probable that he began his career at the Smock Alley Theatre in Dublin before moving to London in 1700. It is also likely he was the brother of Letitia Cross. From 1710 to 1724 he appeared at the Drury Lane with a brief period at the Queen's Theatre in Haymarket. The actor also named Richard Cross was likely to have been his son.

== Selected roles ==
- Charino in Love Makes a Man by Colley Cibber (1700)
- Major Bombard in The Old Mode and the New by Thomas d'Urfey (1703)
- Salathiel in Farewell Folly by Peter Motteux (1705)
- Sir Hary Atall in The Double Gallant by Colley Cibber (1707)
- Slouch in The Man's Bewitched by Susanna Centlivre (1709)
- Sir Humphrey in The What D'Ye Call It by John Gay (1715)
- Constable in The Contrivances by Henry Carey (1715)
- Carbuncle in The Country Lasses by Charles Johnson (1715)

== Bibliography ==
- Highfill, Philip H, Burnim, Kalman A. & Langhans, Edward A. A Biographical Dictionary of Actors, Actresses, Musicians, Dancers, Managers, and Other Stage Personnel in London, 1660–1800: West to Zwingman. SIU Press, 1973.
