= William Bowen (actor) =

British actor

William Bowen (1666–1718) was a British stage actor. He was part of the United Company from 1689. For a time, he became known for his comic roles. He was fatally wounded in a duel with fellow actor James Quin in 1718.

== Selected roles ==
- Valet in Bury Fair by Thomas Shadwell (1689)
- Whiff in The Widow Ranter by Aphra Behn (1689)
- Lignoreles in The Massacre of Paris by Nathaniel Lee (1689)
- Sancho in The Successful Strangers by William Mountfort (1690)
- Sir Gentle Golding in Sir Anthony Love by Thomas Southerne (1690)
- Coachman in The English Friar by John Crowne (1690)
- Tranio in Amphitryon by John Dryden (1690)
- Lopez in The Mistakes by Joseph Harris (1690)
- Fabion in Alphonso, King of Naples by George Powell (1690)
- Albanact in King Arthur by John Dryden (1691)
- Monsieur Le Prate in Love for Money by Thomas D'Urfey (1691)
- Monsieur Lassoil in Bussy D'Ambois by Thomas D'Urfey (1691)
- Thoughtless in Greenwich Park by William Mountfort (1691)
- Sir Timothy Kastril in The Volunteers by Thomas Shadwell (1692)
- Callow in The Marriage-Hater Matched by Thomas D'Urfey (1692)
- Sir Joseph in The Old Bachelor by William Congreve (1693)
- Cummington in The Richmond Heiress by Thomas D'Urfey (1693)
- Sir Symphony in The Maid's Last Prayer by Thomas Southerne (1693)
- Squeezewit in A Very Good Wife by George Powell (1693)
- Sir John in The Married Beau by John Crowne (1694)
- Jaqueline in The Fatal Marriage by Thomas Southerne (1694)
- Jeremy in Love for Love by William Congreve (1695)
- Sir John Aery in The She-Gallants by George Granville (1695)
- Jasper in The City Lady by Thomas Dilke (1696)
- Cheatall in The Innocent Mistress by Mary Pix (1697)
- Nickycrack in The Pretenders by Thomas Dilke (1698)
- Teague in The Twin Rivals by George Farquhar (1702)
- Monsieur de Pistolein The Old Mode and the New by Thomas d'Urfey (1703)
- Gusman in Adventures in Madrid by Mary Pix (1706)
- Captain Strut in The Double Gallant by Colley Cibber (1707)
- Truncheon in The Play is the Plot by John Durant Breval (1718)

== Bibliography ==
- Highfill, Philip H, Burnim, Kalman A. & Langhans, Edward A. A Biographical Dictionary of Actors, Actresses, Musicians, Dancers, Managers, and Other Stage Personnel in London, 1660-1800: Garrick to Gyngell. SIU Press, 1978.
- Straub, Kristina, G. Anderson, Misty and O'Quinn, Daniel . The Routledge Anthology of Restoration and Eighteenth-Century Drama. Taylor & Francis, 2017.
