= The Fatal Vision =

Play by Aaron Hill

- Original language: English
- Written by: Aaron Hill
- Genre: Tragedy

Premiere
- Date: 7 February 1716
- Place: Lincoln's Inn Fields Theatre

The Fatal Vision is a 1716 tragedy by the British writer Aaron Hill. It is also known as The Fatal Vision: Or, the Fall of Siam.

It is set at the Chinese imperial court in an unspecified time, and features the Chinese Emperor, his wife and two sons plus a captive princess from Siam.

Hill funded the production using his own money. It ran for seven nights at the Lincoln's Inn Fields Theatre.

== Bibliography ==
- Burling, William J. A Checklist of New Plays and Entertainments on the London Stage, 1700-1737. Fairleigh Dickinson Univ Press, 1992.
- Gerrard, Christine. Aaron Hill: The Muses' Projector, 1685-1750. Oxford University Press, 2003.
