= Martin Folkes =

English mathematician and astronomer

Martin Folkes FRS
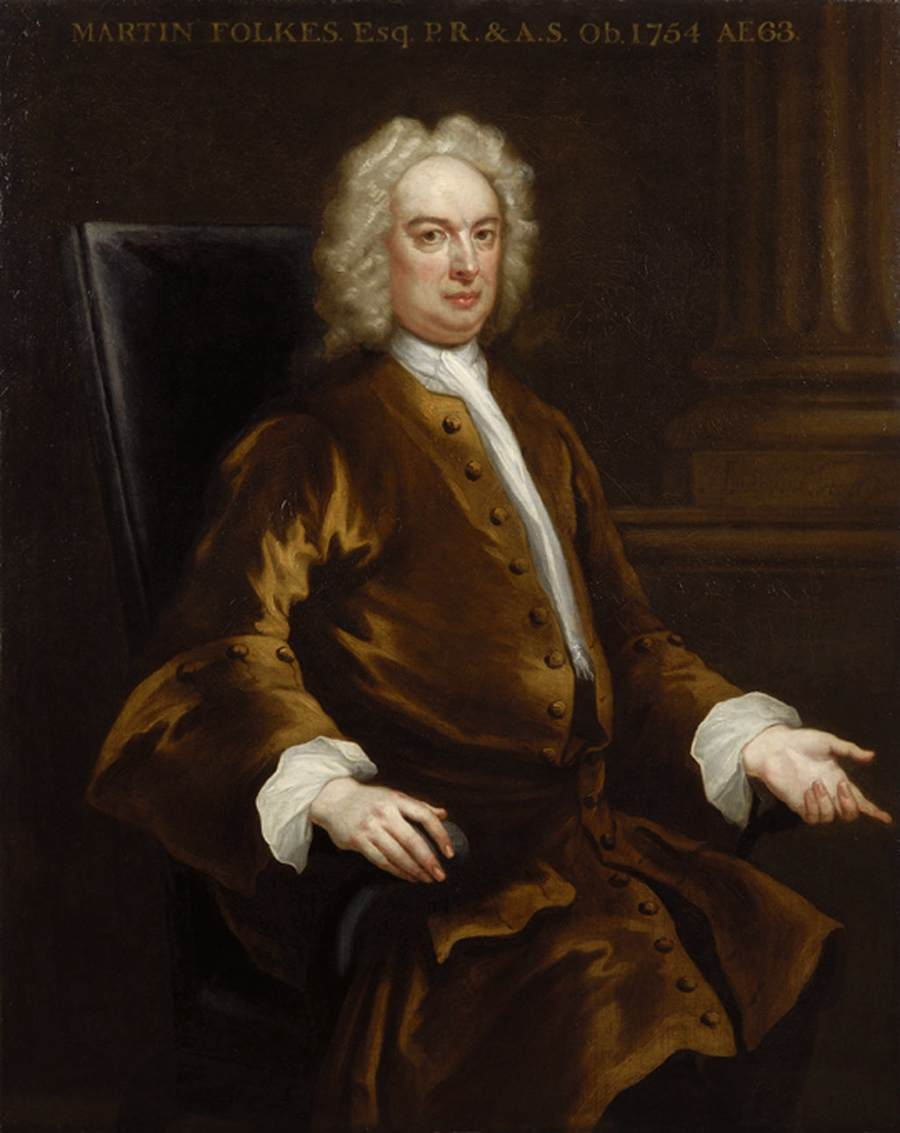

President of the Royal Society
- In office 1741–1752
- Preceded by: Hans Sloane
- Succeeded by: George Parker

Personal details
- Born: 29 October 1690 Westminster, London, England, UK
- Died: 28 June 1754 (aged 63)
- Spouse: Lucretia Bradshaw (fl.1714–1741)
- Children: 3
- Occupation: Antiquary, numismatist, mathematician and astronomer

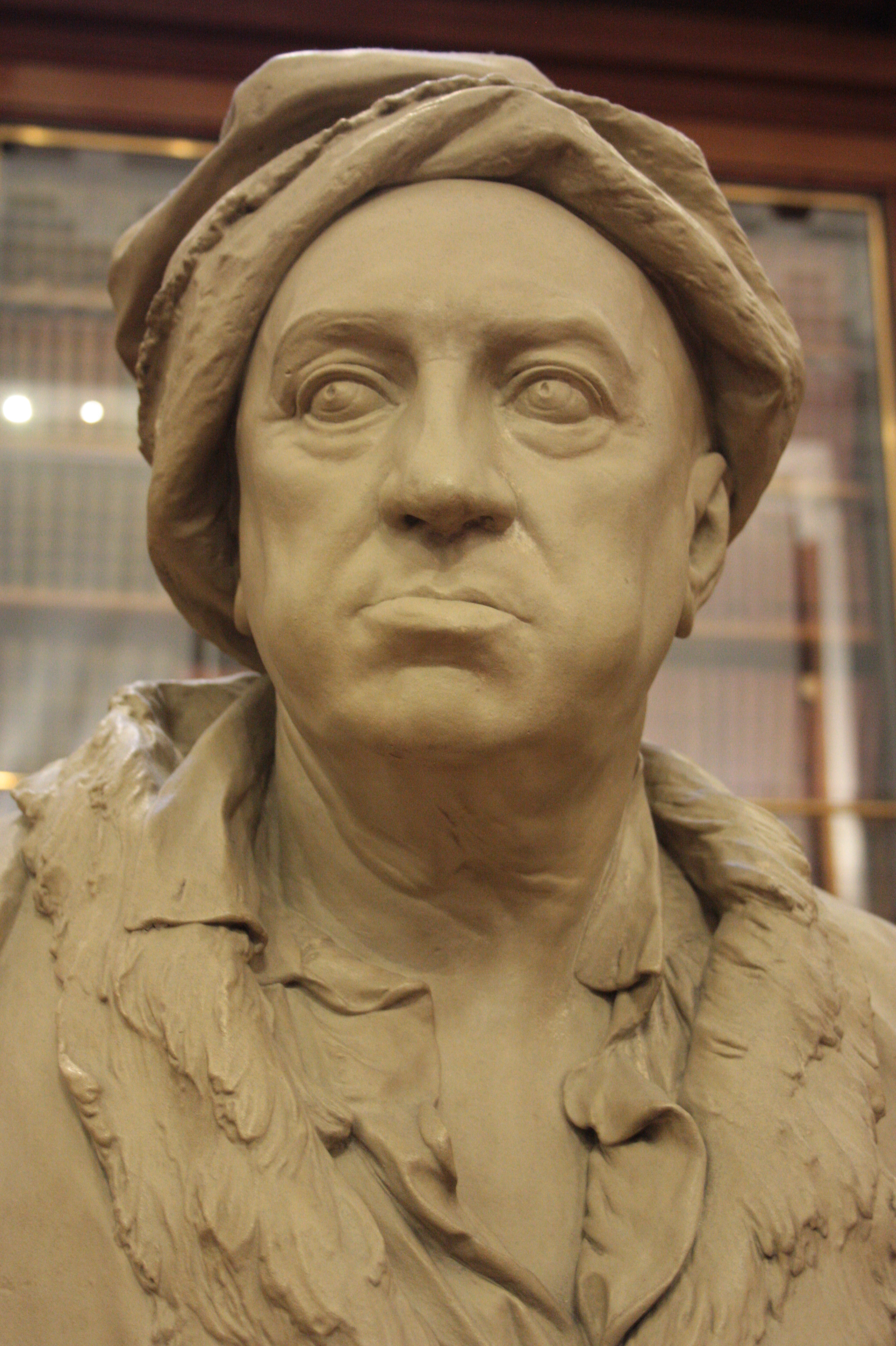
Martin Folkes by Roubiliac, British Museum

Martin Folkes FRS (29 October 1690 – 28 June 1754) was an English antiquary, numismatist, mathematician and astronomer who served as the president of the Royal Society from 1741 to 1752.

== Life ==
Folkes was born in Westminster on 29 October 1690, the eldest son of Martin Folkes, councillor at Law. Educated at Clare College, Cambridge, he so distinguished himself in mathematics that when only twenty-three years of age he was chosen a fellow of the Royal Society. He was elected one of the council in 1716, and in 1723 Sir Isaac Newton, president of the society, appointed him one of the vice-presidents. On the death of Newton he became a candidate for the presidency, but was defeated by Sir Hans Sloane, whom, however, he succeeded in 1741; in 1742 he was made a member of the French Royal Academy of Sciences; in 1746 he received honorary degrees from Oxford and Cambridge.

Folkes was a prominent Freemason, being appointed Deputy Grand Master of the Premier Grand Lodge of England during the year 1724–1725.

In 1733 he set out on a tour through Italy, in the course of which he composed his Dissertations on the weights and Values of Ancient Coins. Before the Society of Antiquaries, of which he was president from 1749 to 1754, he read in 1736 his Observations on the Trajan and Antonine Pillars at Rome and his Table of English Gold Coins from the 18th Year of King Edward III. In 1745 he printed the latter with another on the history of silver coinage. He also contributed both to the Society of Antiquaries and to the Royal Society other papers, chiefly on Roman antiquities. In 1739 he was elected one of the founding vice-presidents of London's charitable Foundling Hospital for abandoned children, a position he maintained until 1747.

Folkes was married in 1714 to Lucretia Bradshaw, an actress who had appeared at the Haymarket and Drury Lane (see Nichols's Lit. Anecdot. ii. 578–598). His portrait was painted and etched by William Hogarth (1697–1764).

Folkes was a noted atheist, and opposed racial prejudice. Some of his public statements have been interpreted as evidence of a Darwinian viewpoint. According to the archaeologist William Stukeley, he set up an Infidels Club in 1720, and caused several young noblemen of the Royal Society to jeer whenever scriptural material was injected into a scientific debate.

For Sir John Hill's attack on Folkes (Review of the Works of the Royal Soc., 1751), see Isaac D'Israeli, Calamities and Quarrels of Authors (1860), pp. 364–366.

There is a memorial to Folkes at Westminster Abbey.

== Sources ==
- Haycock, David Boyd. "Folkes, Martin". Oxford Dictionary of National Biography (online ed.). Oxford University Press. doi:10.1093/ref:odnb/9795. (Subscription, Wikipedia Library access or UK public library membership required.)

== See also ==
- List of presidents of the Royal Society

Professional and academic associations
Preceded by Hans Sloane	14th President of the Royal Society; 1741–1752	Succeeded by George Parker
