= The Widdow Ranter, or, the History of Bacon in Virginia =

1689 tragicomic play by Aphra Behn

The Widdow Ranter, or, the History of Bacon in Virginia is a tragicomic play written by Aphra Behn and first performed posthumously in 1689. It is a highly fictionalized version of Bacon's Rebellion of 1676, and is one of the first plays to be set in British colonial America. It is also the first travel play known to have been written not only by a woman, but by a playwright who had actually traveled to the Americas.

Through her heroic presentation of Nathaniel Bacon and his contempt for the colonial administration, Behn seems to voice her own disillusionment with the morality of colonization (an attitude that also finds expression in her novel Oroonoko).

== Plot ==
The play purports to describe how the colonist Nathaniel Bacon and a volunteer force of Indian fighters temporarily succeeded in overthrowing the government of Sir William Berkeley. Behn portrays Bacon as a heroic figure motivated by honor, and in love with Semernia, an Indian princess.

Behn's play has four plots featuring virtually separate casts of characters. One of these is the young and outrageous widow Ranter, who puts on men’s clothes and fights in several battles. Many of the supporting characters present an unflattering portrayal of colonial life in Virginia.

The work ends happily for most characters, with the major exceptions of Bacon, Semernia and the Indian king Cavarnio.

== Reception ==
The play was produced posthumously, and was unsuccessful with audiences. It was first performed at the Drury Lane Theatre in November 1689. The cast included John Bowman as Cavarnio, Joseph Williams as Bacon, John Freeman as Wellman, George Powell as Friendly, Joseph Harris as Downright, Samuel Sandford as Dareing, Cave Underhill as Timerous Cornet, William Bowen as Whiff, Anne Bracegirdle as Semernia, Frances Maria Knight as Madame Surelove, Katherine Corey as Mrs Flirt and Elizabeth Currer as Widow Ranter.

Barbara Corte suggests that The Widdow Ranter is an unusual tragicomedy that gives both its comic and tragic plots a heroic inflection.
