= Elfrid =

Play by Aaron Hill

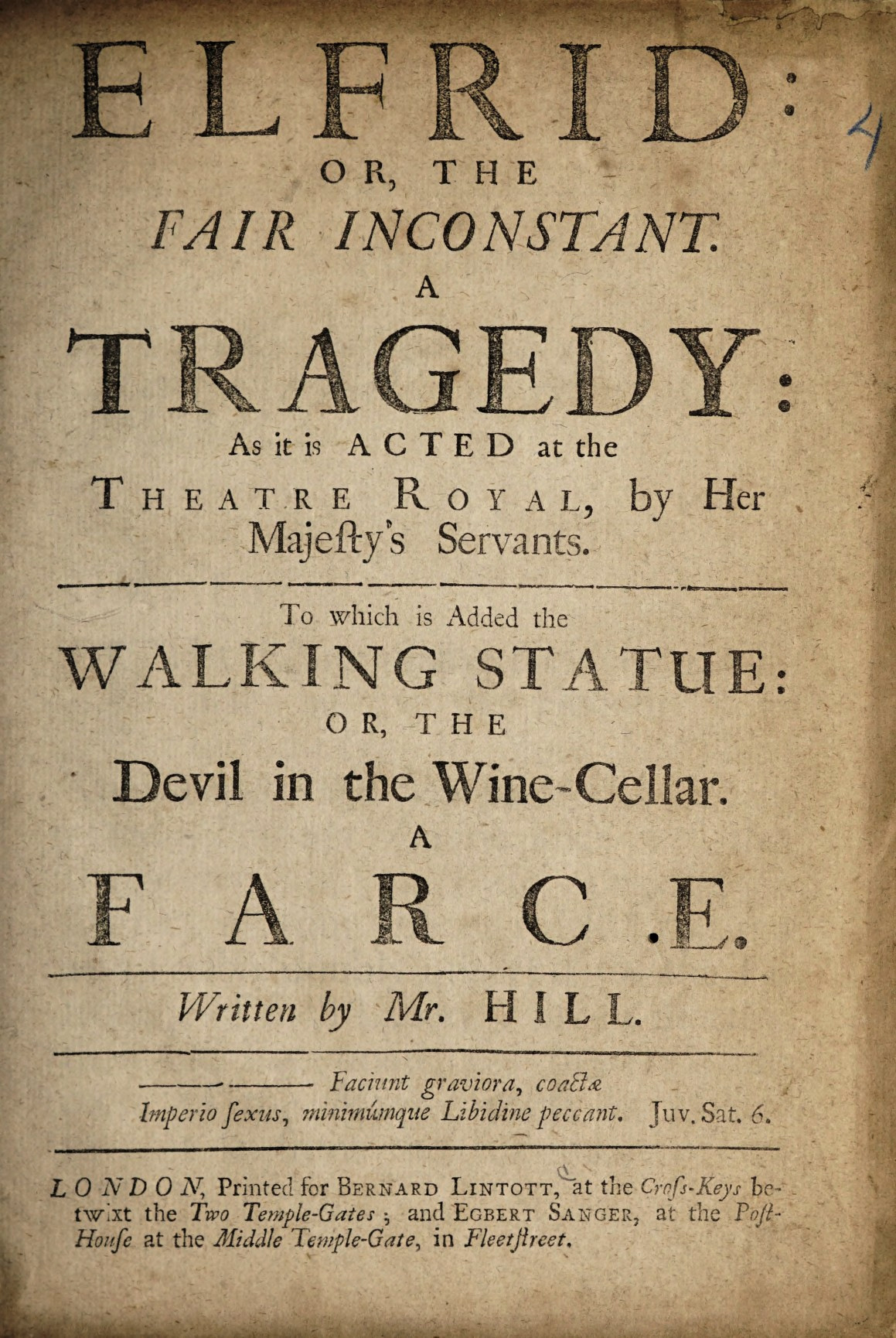
- Title page of the first edition of Elfrid (1710)
- Original language: English
- Written by: Aaron Hill
- Genre: Tragedy

Premiere
- Date: 3 January 1710
- Place: Theatre Royal, Drury Lane

Elfrid: or The Fair Inconstant, generally shortened to Elfrid, is a 1710 tragedy by the British writer Aaron Hill.

Hill wrote the work in less than a fortnight. Set in Saxon England it featured Barton Booth as Athelwold, Charles Powell as King Edgar and Lucretia Bradshaw as Elfrid. Concerned about the play's modest reception, Hill wrote an afterpiece entitled The Walking Statue which proved to be more popular than the main play, and was revived numerous times.

In 1731 Hill reworked the play and staged it under a new title Athelwold at Drury Lane. It marked his return to the London stage after an eight year absence. Although he hoped to persuade Robert Wilks to star in the title role, it ended up being played by Roger Bridgewater. Although Alexander Pope tried to generate interest, the new version lasted for three nights and met a largely poor reception.

== Bibliography ==
- Burling, William J. A Checklist of New Plays and Entertainments on the London Stage, 1700-1737. Fairleigh Dickinson Univ Press, 1992.
- Gerrard, Christine. Aaron Hill: The Muses' Projector, 1685-1750. Oxford University Press, 2003.
