= The Marriage-Hater Matched =

1692 play

- Original language: English
- Written by: Thomas D'Urfey
- Genre: Restoration Comedy

Premiere
- Date: January 1692
- Place: Theatre Royal, Drury Lane, London

The Marriage-Hater Matched is a comedy play by the English writer Thomas D'Urfey. It was first staged by the United Company at the Theatre Royal, Drury Lane in January 1692. The original cast included John Bowman as Brainless, William Mountfort as Sir Philip Freewit, Samuel Sandford as Limber, John Hodgson as Darewell, Anthony Leigh as Myn Here Van Grin, George Bright as Bias, Thomas Doggett as Solon, William Bowen as Callow, Colley Cibber as Splutter, Elizabeth Barry as Lady Subtle, Katherine Corey as Lady Bumfiddle, Anne Bracegirdle as Phoebe, Charlotte Butler as La Pupsey and Abigail Lawson as Margery.

== Bibliography ==
- Van Lennep, W. The London Stage, 1660-1800: Volume One, 1660-1700. Southern Illinois University Press, 1960.
