= The Woman Captain =

1679 play

- Original language: English
- Written by: Thomas Shadwell
- Genre: Restoration Comedy

Premiere
- Date: December 1679
- Place: Dorset Garden Theatre, London

The Woman Captain; Or, The Usurer Turned Soldier is a 1679 comedy by the English writer Thomas Shadwell. It was originally staged by the Duke's Company at Dorset Garden Theatre in London. The original cast is unknown except for Elizabeth Barry who played the title role, and also read the epilogue. It is part of the tradition of Restoration Comedy that flourished during the era.

It was revived in 1710 at Drury Lane featuring Lucretia Bradshaw and Henry Norris then again in 1716 and 1717 at the Lincoln's Inn Fields Theatre with Sarah Thurmond starring.

== Bibliography ==
- Canfield, J. Douglas. Tricksters and Estates: On the Ideology of Restoration Comedy. University Press of Kentucky, 2014.
- Van Lennep, W. The London Stage, 1660-1800: Volume One, 1660-1700. Southern Illinois University Press, 1960.
