= The City Bride =

1696 play

- Original language: English
- Written by: Joseph Harris
- Genre: Comedy

Premiere
- Date: April 1696
- Place: Lincoln's Inn Fields Theatre, London

The City Bride; Or, The Merry Cuckold is a 1696 comedy play by the English writer Joseph Harris. It premiered at the Lincoln's Inn Fields Theatre, staged by Thomas Betterton's company. The plot was inspired by John Fletcher's A Cure for a Cuckold.

The original Lincoln's Inn Fields cast included John Bowman as Bonvile, John Thurmond as Friendly, George Bright as Justice Merryman, Samuel Bailey as Mr Spruce, John Freeman as Compasse, Elizabeth Bowman as Arabella, Elizabeth Boutell as Clara and Abigail Lawson as Nurse.

== Bibliography ==
- Van Lennep, W. The London Stage, 1660-1800: Volume One, 1660-1700. Southern Illinois University Press, 1960.
