= The Massacre of Paris =

1689 play

- Original language: English
- Written by: Nathaniel Lee
- Genre: Tragedy
- Setting: Paris, 1570s

Premiere
- Date: 7 November 1689
- Place: Theatre Royal, Drury Lane, London

The Massacre of Paris is a 1689 tragedy by the English writer Nathaniel Lee. It was first staged by the United Company at the Theatre Royal, Drury Lane. It is based around the 1572 St. Bartholomew's Day massacre which led the killing of many Huguenots during the French Wars of Religion. The events had previously been portrayed in Christopher Marlowe's Elizabethan play The Massacre at Paris.

The original Drury Lane cast included William Mountfort as Charles IX of France, Joseph Williams as Duke of Guise, Edward Kynaston as Cardinal of Lorrain, Joseph Harris as Alberto Gondi, William Bowen as Lignoroles, Thomas Betterton as Admiral of France, John Bowman as Genius, John Freeman as Cavagnes, John Verbruggen as Langoiran, Mary Betterton as Queen Mother, Elizabeth Barry as Marguerite and Frances Maria Knight as Queen of Navarre. Henry Purcell provided the incidental music.

It was the most stridently anti-Catholic play of the period, and as such harked back to an earlier era. The first performance was attended by the new Queen Mary who had recently come to the throne as part of the Glorious Revolution that overthrew her Catholic father James II.

== Bibliography ==
- Nicoll, Allardyce. History of English Drama, 1660-1900: Volume 1, Restoration Drama, 1660-1700. Cambridge University Press, 1952.
- Streete, Adrian. Apocalypse and Anti-Catholicism in Seventeenth-Century English Drama. Cambridge University Press, 2017.
- Van Lennep, W. The London Stage, 1660-1800: Volume One, 1660-1700. Southern Illinois University Press, 1960.
