= A Very Good Wife =

1693 play

- Original language: English
- Written by: George Powell
- Genre: Comedy

Premiere
- Date: April 1693
- Place: Theatre Royal, Drury Lane, London

A Very Good Wife is a 1693 comedy play by the English writer George Powell. It was first performed by the United Company at the Theatre Royal, Drury Lane with a cast that included Powell as Courtwitt, John Hodgson as Wellborn, William Bowen as Squeezwit, George Bright as Venture, Joseph Haines as Sneaksby, Colley Cibber as Aminadab, Susanna Mountfort as Annabella, Frances Maria Knight as Widow Lacy, Elinor Leigh as Mrs Sneaksby.

== Bibliography ==
- Van Lennep, W. The London Stage, 1660-1800: Volume One, 1660-1700. Southern Illinois University Press, 1960.
