= Darius, King of Persia =

1688 play

- Original language: English
- Written by: John Crowne
- Genre: Tragedy

Premiere
- Date: April 1688
- Place: Theatre Royal, Drury Lane, London

Darius, King of Persia is a 1688 tragedy by the English writer John Crowne. It portrays the reign of Darius III of Persian Empire, focusing on his defeat by Alexander the Great and subsequent death.

It was performed by the United Company at the Theatre Royal, Drury Lane in late April before being succeeded by the hit The Squire of Alsatia. The roles played by the various actors are unknown, apart from Elizabeth Barry who appeared as Barzana and also spoke the epilogue. It was noted for the attendance on the play's third night by James II, who later the same year was overthrown in the Glorious Revolution.

== Bibliography ==
- Van Lennep, W. The London Stage, 1660-1800: Volume One, 1660-1700. Southern Illinois University Press, 1960.
- White, Arthur Franklin. John Crowne: His Life and Dramatic Works. Routledge, 2019.
