= The What D'Ye Call It =

1715 comedy by John Gay

- Original language: English
- Written by: John Gay
- Genre: Comedy

Premiere
- Date: 23 February 1715
- Place: Theatre Royal, Drury Lane

The What D'Ye Call It is a 1715 farce by the British writer John Gay. It was written as a parody of tragic plays, with particular reference to Thomas Otway's Venice Preserv'd.

It was originally performed as an afterpiece with Nicholas Rowe's tragedy Jane Shore at Drury Lane, the cast including Benjamin Johnson, Henry Norris, Richard Cross, James Quin and Elizabeth Younger and Margaret Bicknell. This was followed by a command performance the next night attended by George, Prince of Wales, possibly due to the influence of Gay's friend Henrietta Howard. A hit, by the end of the season it had been performed seventeen times. It was revived frequently during the eighteenth century and is Gay's second most performed work after The Beggar's Opera.

It features a ballad "'Twas When the Seas Were Roaring" (also known as "The Meloncholy Nymph") to music written by George Frideric Handel which achieved popularity in its own right and was soon on sale as a song sheet. Gay and Handel collaborated subsequently on Acis and Galatea (1718).

== Bibliography ==
- Burling, William J. A Checklist of New Plays and Entertainments on the London Stage, 1700–1737. Fairleigh Dickinson Univ Press, 1992.
- Day, Gary & Lynch, Jack. The Encyclopedia of British Literature, 3 Volume Set: 1660 – 1789. John Wiley & Sons, 2015.
- Dugaw, Dianne. "Deep Play": John Gay and the Invention of Modernity. University of Delaware Press, 2001.
- Winton, Calhoun. John Gay and the London Theatre. University Press of Kentucky, 2014.
