= The Contrivances =

1715 play

- Original language: English
- Written by: Henry Carey
- Genre: Comedy

Premiere
- Date: 9 August 1715
- Place: Theatre Royal, Drury Lane

The Contrivances is a 1715 comedy play by the British writer Henry Carey. A farce, it produced was an afterpiece to follow on from a revival of Bonduca.

The original Drury Lane cast included Henry Norris as Argus, James Quin as Rovewell, Joe Miller as Robin, Richard Cross as Constable and Mary Willis as Arethusa.

== Bibliography ==
- Burling, William J. A Checklist of New Plays and Entertainments on the London Stage, 1700-1737. Fairleigh Dickinson Univ Press, 1992.
- Van Lennep, W. The London Stage, 1660-1800: Volume Two, 1700-1729. Southern Illinois University Press, 1960.
