= Ariadne (writer) =

17th c. playwright, real identity unknown

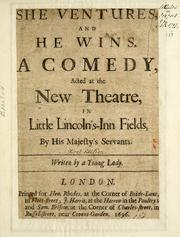
Original title-page for She Ventures and He Wins, with the author cited as "A Young Lady"

Ariadne was the pseudonym of a "Young Lady" who wrote the play She Ventures and He Wins, which was first performed at The New Theatre in its 1694-95 season. Little is known of her, however she was likely a novice writer who was "keenly aware of theatrical conventions and the politics of the theater". In the preface to her play, Ariadne says that she is not "altogether unacquainted with the Stage". Then, in her prologue, she attacks the owners of a rival theatre, saying that they "out of spite / Trump'd up a Play upon us in a Night", suggesting that she was at least some way involved with the theatre world of 17th century London.

The play was a failure, closing after just two nights. It was, however, the first play written by a woman to be performed in London for 20 years, with the exception of works by Aphra Behn who had died six years before its production. Ariadne praises Behn in both the Preface and in the Prologue. Despite its failure on the stage, the play went on to be published in 1696.

Critics and researchers have debated the identity of Ariadne. Some suggest that Ariadne was really Mary Pix, but there is little evidence to support this suggestion. Another believes that Ariadne was also the author of Love's Reward: or, the Unnatural Mother.
