= She Ventures and He Wins =

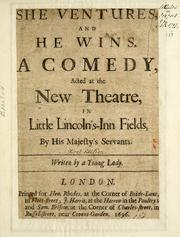
Original cover for She Ventures and He Wins, with the author cited as "A Young Woman"

She Ventures and He Wins (1696) is a comedy in five acts written by a "Young Lady" under the pseudonym of "Ariadne". The author, who is referred to by most documents and historians by her pseudonym, caused an uproar between the theaters of the area. Ariadne is noted as writing with humor and wit that matches that of her contemporaries. The original manuscript mentioned it was an adaptation of a "small novel", which has since been discovered to be The Fair Extravagant by Alexander Oldys, an unknown story that had been almost unheard of since its publication. Much of the plot remains the same with detail, some plot points, and characters changed. The main character in the Oldys text's name is Ariadne.

== Summary ==
She Ventures and He Wins tells the story of two women who are tired of the old ways of dealing with the affairs of the heart. Charlotte, Juliana and Urania devise their own plans. Charlotte and Juliana dresses as a man in order to go into the world to find her perfect man while Urania, happily married, must fight off the romantic advances of Squire Wouldbe. Charlotte is an heiress who wants to marry a man who loves her for her mind, not her money. She dresses up as a boy, falls in love with Lovewell and, her true sex revealed, marries him. She then decides to test his love and the play proceeds in a confusion of masks and mistaken identities. Meanwhile, the upwardly-mobile Squire Wouldbe is lusting after the innkeeper's wife, Urania, who cooks up a suitable punishment for the would-be cuckolder.

=== "A Young Woman" ===
The true identity of the author of She Ventures and He Wins has generated as much intrigue as the play itself. While academics have speculated, there has been no solid evidence linking "Ariadne" to a historical person. The author's pseudonym of "Ariadne" is probably drawn from the novel The Fair Extravagant on which this play is based, where the name of the main character is "Ariadne".

Ariadne, a goddess in Greek mythology, is the daughter of King Minos of Crete and the wife of Dionysus. While already married to Dionysus, Ariadne fell in love with Theseus who help her by promising to take her to Athens as his wife. She gave him two special gifts, a sword and a clue of thread, to find a way back from the Cnossian Labyrinth after killing the Minotaur. She give Theseus the information that he needs to defeat the Minotaur. Ariadne is seen as a very progressive tale because of the strength that she shows compared to other female characters at the time the myth began.

The author Ariadne was a strong, successful woman who broke the conventions of the time so much so that not only does she write under a pseudonym, but even her pseudonym was not included in the original publication. The writer of the epilogue of She Ventures and He Wins, Peter Motteux, tried to capitalize on the play by discrediting Ariadne.

== Plot ==
A re-typed, easier to read, version of the script can be found here: http://quod.lib.umich.edu/e/eebo/A59615.0001.001?view=toc

=== Act 1 ===
The play opens with Charlotte and Juliana discussing their problems with men and Charlotte's struggle to find a suitable husband whom she likes. Charlotte quotes her "youth and fortune" as the reasoning for not being able to find a husband who loves her for who she really is. Charlotte realizes that the only way she will be able to find out if a man truly loves her, she must dress up as a man and find out what kind of men they truly are. Meanwhile, Freeman and his wife, Urania, read a letter that had been sent to Urania requesting her company by a "humble servant", suggesting that she has nothing to gain from being with her husband. Later, in St. James Park, we find Charlotte and Juliana dressed in men's clothing. When Lovewell enters the park, they strike up a conversation with him, questioning him on his morals and beliefs; in this line of questioning, Charlotte learns that Lovewell is a sacred, honorable, upstanding man. This makes her unhappy because she assumes that he is lying. Charlotte convinces Lovewell to meet her tomorrow morning; she says that she will have two young ladies and the one that takes his hand is the one he must marry. Lovewell agrees to the plan.

=== Act 2 ===
Act 2 opens with Squire Wouldbe reading the letter that he has written to Urania asking for her love. When his wife, Dowdy, enters, he hides the letter from her. She does not believe that nothing is going on, as he says, and begins to cry. After an argument about their marriage and trust, he convinces her that nothing is going on and that he should go on with his business for the day. After he leaves Mrs. Beldam, Dowdy's mother, comes, upset with her son-in-law for the way he treats her daughter, and then departs on her own business for the day. In a different part of town, Sir Charles and Sir Roger talk and sing about the women that they love or have yet to love. Charlotte and Juliana enter the park dressed in men's clothes discussing the matter at hand with their love lives. In a tavern, Freeman, Urania, and Doll prepare the meal for the guests while discussing their lives and the problem with trust in the relationship between Freeman and Urania. Freeman leaves Urania alone with her troubles.

=== Act 3 ===
The third act opens with Squire Wouldbe undressing for bed and questioning his own morality saying "When am I going to hell". The devil enters in a dream like sequence, fighting and seizing him. After the squire is thoroughly scared, Urania and Freeman enter laughing, exposing the "devil" to be a scheme concocted by them to punish the squire for lusting after another's wife. Meanwhile, Lovewell goes to the home of Sir Roger where they discuss the women that they are in love with and the prospect of a future with both of them. The leave each other with their plans for the next day in the park. Charlotte and Juliana enter the park, dressed as women but in masks as Charlotte had told Lovewell the day before, nervous and ready to meet the men that they want to marry. She makes him agree to marry her before he sees the beauty under before she will unmask; once he agrees, she takes off the mask and he is blown away by her beauty. They agree to be married at once and Juliana comes along to be the witness. Meanwhile, Squire Wouldbe tells Dowdy of all the wrongs that he has done that evening and how he was punished for them. She forgives him as long as he does not sleep in their bed that night. After the wedding of Charlotte and Lovewell, there is a great feast, much singing and dancing.

=== Act 4 ===
During the wedding feast, Lovewell's friends, Sir Roger and Sir Charles arrive. Lovewell discloses to Sir Roger that Juliana is in love with him and that he should act upon this love. Urania receives another note, this time it appears to be written by Dowdy telling her to come to the park to witness the squire cheating on his wife. Urania's mother comes to the home of Charlotte and Lovewell to tell them to also come to the park. They trick Squire Wouldbe in the park into thinking he is cheating on his wife with a beautiful mistress, but rather is it just an older woman in a mask. Charlotte confesses to Juliana that her brother, whom Juliana is in love with, is already betrothed.

=== Act 5 ===
Sir Roger meets with Charlotte to convince her to go to Lovewell and live a happy life with him. The final act of the play is the telling of multiple fights between every character of the show. This includes Lovewell and Roger fighting over Charlotte, Bellafira fighting for Sir Frankwood, Julianna fighting for Sir Roger, Sir Charles fighting for Juliana and Dowdy and her mother getting in the way of every fight. Everyone has a happy ending. Charlotte and Lovewood end up together, Sir Roger with Bellafira, and Sir Charles with Juliana.

"Love.

At last the Storm is over blown,

And on that happy Coast I'm thrown

Where all my Joys are laid in store,

Heaven cannot give, nor could I ask one more."

(She Ventures and He Wins, Act 1, Sc. 1)

== Roles ==
=== Women ===
Charlotte - A Rich Heiress

Juliana her Cousin - in love with Sir Frankford

Bellafira - in love with Sir Marwood

Urania - wife to Freeman

Dowdy - wife to Squire Wouldbe, pretending to rule her Husband, yet always jealous

Mrs. Beldam - Dowdy's mother, a pawn-broker

Doll - Urania's maid

=== Men ===
Sir Charles Frankford - Brother to Charlotte, in love with Juliana

Sir Roger Marwood - Friend to Sir Charles

Lovewell - A young brother of small Fortune, married to Charlotte

Squire Wouldbe - a proud, pragmatical Coxcomb of poor extraction, husband to Dowdy

== Theatre theories ==
=== Feminist Theory ===
Much of She Ventures and He Wins can be applied to Feminist Theory. Feminist Theory can be defined by Mark Fortier as working toward the unraveling and overthrow of the patriarchy. It is a struggle against the oppression of women as women.

The play, similar to other plays at the time, involves female cross dressing. "Between 1660 and 1700, eighty-nine of the three-hundred and twenty-five plays produced in London featured at least on female actor in male guise, and women frequently made cross-dressed appearances in entr'acte entertainment in all female productions." While it can be assumed that many plays at this time only involved the cross dressing because their young male actors were no longer young enough to pass for females, we can also look at this through a feminist lens. Charlotte is not only asserting her own rights by dressing as a man and taking control of her own destiny, but also puts Charlotte as a primary character and main source of plot development. Not only can the characters involved in the play be attributed to this theory, but the author herself can be as well. At the time of its first performance, She Ventures and He Wins was one of only two plays written by women.

When Charlotte proposes to Lovewell, she says that he must take her "as you see me", standing her ground and maintaining her dominance even though she only won him over as a man.

Elizabeth Berry, who also originated the role of Urania, sponsored the play in the hopes of the novelty of a female playwright making the show successful.

== Reactions ==
She Ventures and He Wins only ran for two performances mainly because the playwright made accusations against the theater company that had been performing the work. In the opening of the play, the character talks about warfare between two theater companies, the New Theater (at which this show premiered) and Christopher Rich's Patent Theater. This showed that Ariadne knew the workings of the theater world and the shady workings that these theaters were doing in order to put on plays. This prologue mentioned the Patent Theater's reputation to hurry out the production of shows in order to beat rival theaters. These accusations were taking seriously by both companies, but especially by playwright and actor George Powell who called Ariadne out in the prologue of his play The British Heroine.

The show only ran for two performances. This was a bad blow to the already struggling New Theatre.

According to Novak (1975: 51), this “may have been due to its feminist reversal of sexual roles,” particularly because Charlotte humiliates Lovewell “to an uncomfortable degree” through her insistence on testing his love. And to this we can add Urania’s humiliation of Squire Wouldbe, which was more justifiable morally speaking, but still a subversion of gender hierarchy and a usurpation of her husband’s role.

== Recent productions ==
She Ventures and He Wins, while not part of the standard theater repertoire, is being performed more frequently at the professional and collegiate level with the rise of celebration of female playwrights. Many of these productions are occurring in the U.K., but there are some in the United States and other countries.

In September 2016, this play was one of six plays performed as part of The Rose Playhouse's festival entitled "A Festival Celebrating Pioneering Women Playwrights of The Restoration 1660 – 1720."
