= Lewis Maidwell =

English writer and educator

Lewis Maidwell (c. 1650–1716) was an English writer and educator.

Born in Northamptonshire he attended Westminster School and graduated from Cambridge University in 1672. He ran a school on King Street in London, and was also a tutor to the sons of the wealthy politician Stephen Fox. Maidwell is noted for his repeated advocacy for the founding of an English Academy similar to the Académie Française in Paris.

He wrote the comedy play The Loving Enemies which was staged by the Duke's Company at the Dorset Garden Theatre in 1680. Maidwell was a long-standing friend of the playwright and poet laureate Nahum Tate.

== Bibliography ==
- Canfield, J. Douglas. Tricksters and Estates: On the Ideology of Restoration Comedy. University Press of Kentucky, 2014.
- Hammond, Paul. The Poems of John Dryden: Volume Two: 1682–1685. Routledge, 2014.
- Spencer, Christopher. Nahum Tate. Twayne Publishers, 1972.
- Van Lennep, W. The London Stage, 1660–1800: Volume One, 1660–1700. Southern Illinois University Press, 1960.
- Ward, Adolphus William & Waller, Alfred Rayney. The Cambridge History of English Literature: From Steele and Addison to Pope and Swift. University Press, 1964.
