= Aaron Hill (writer) =

British writer (1685–1750)

Aaron Hill (10 February 1685 – 8 February 1750) was an English dramatist and miscellany writer.

== Biography ==
The son of a country gentleman of Wiltshire, Hill was educated at Westminster School, and afterwards travelled in the East. He was the author of 17 plays, some of them, such as his versions of Voltaire's Zaire and Mérope, being adaptations. He also wrote poetry, which is of variable quality. Having written some satiric lines on Alexander Pope, he received in return a mention in The Dunciad, which led to a controversy between the two writers. Afterwards a reconciliation took place. He was a friend and correspondent of Samuel Richardson, whose Pamela he highly praised. In addition to his literary pursuits Hill was involved in many commercial schemes, usually unsuccessful.

Hill was the manager of the Theatre Royal, Drury Lane when he was 24 years old, and before being summarily fired for reasons unknown, he staged the premier of George Frideric Handel's Rinaldo, the first Italian opera designed for a London audience. The composer was very involved in the production, and Hill collaborated on the libretto, although it is disputed what his actual contributions were.

In 1724 he founded the bi-weekly periodical The Plain Dealer. A posthumous collection of Hill's essays, letters and poems was published in 1753. His Dramatic Works were published in 1760. His biography was recorded in Lives of the Poets of Great Britain and Ireland, to the Time of Dean Swift, volume 5 (ostensibly by Theophilus Cibber but generally accepted to be of anonymous authorship).

== Selected works ==
- A Full and Just Account of the Present State of the Ottoman Empire (1709)
- Elfrid (1710) play
- The Walking Statue; Or, the Devil in the Wine Cellar (1710) a farce
- Squire Brainless (1710) Farce
- The Fatal Vision (1716) play
- Fatal Extravagance (1721) play
- King Henry the Fifth: Or, the Conquest of France, By the English. A Tragedy. (1723)
- Athelwold (1731) a revision of Elfrid
- The Plain Dealer (1724) essays with William Bond
- The Progress of Wit, being a caveat for the use of an Eminent Writer (1730)
- The Prompter (1735) essays
- Zara (produced 1736) after Voltaire
- Mérope (1749), after Voltaire
- The Roman Revenge (1754), after Voltaire
- The Insolvent, or Filial Piety (1758)
- Daraxes (published 1760) a pastoral opera
- Merlin in Love (published 1760) a pantomime opera
- The Muses in Mourning (published 1760) an opera
- Saul (published 1760) a tragedy
- A Snake in the Grass (published 1760) a burlesque
