= John Gay =

English poet and playwright (1685–1732)

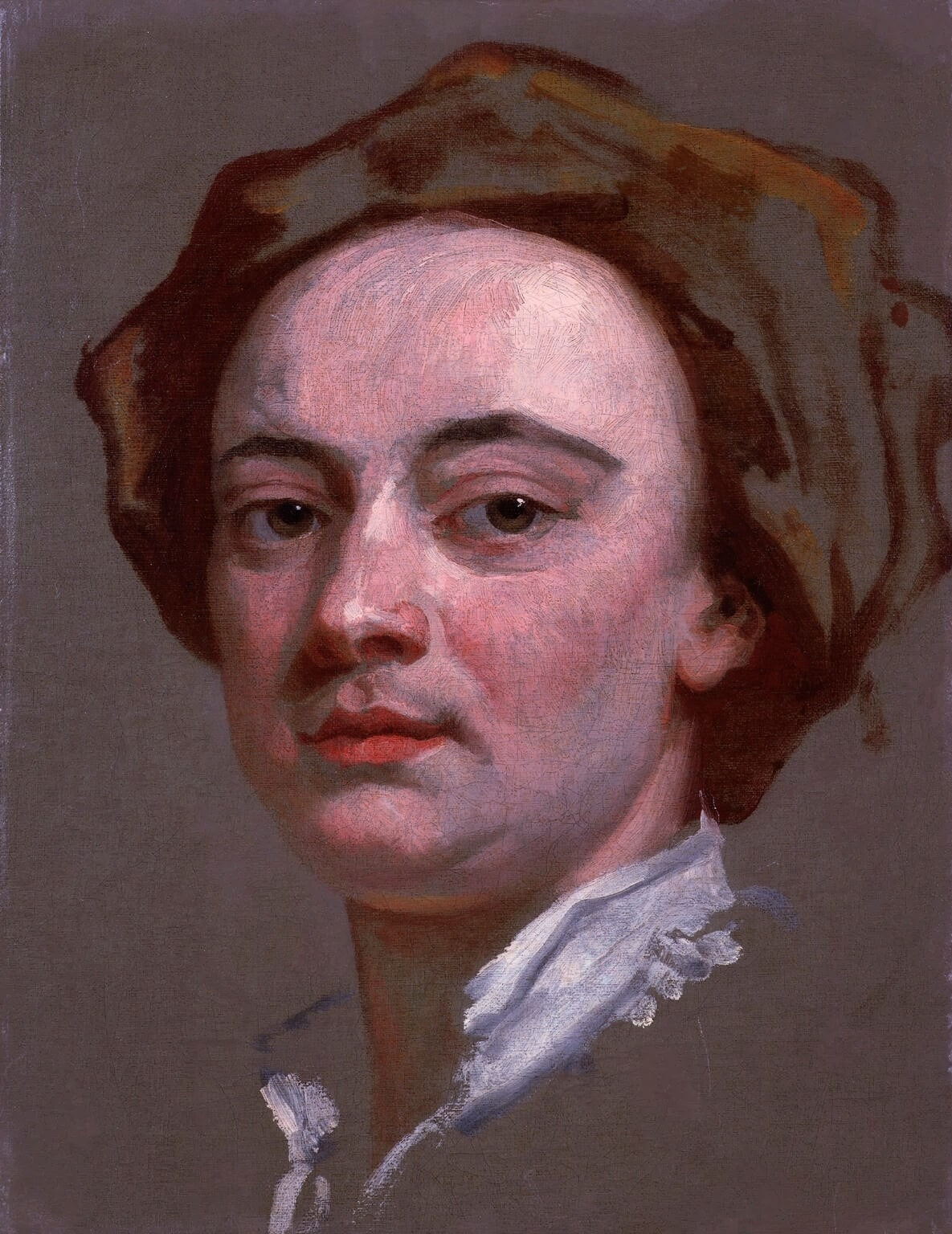
- Oil painting by Godfrey Kneller of an unknown man traditionally identified as John Gay
- Born: 30 June 1685; Barnstaple, Devon, England
- Died: 4 December 1732 (aged 47); London, England
- Known for: Poetry, drama, ballad opera
- Notable work: The Beggar's Opera
- Patrons: William Pulteney, 1st Earl of Bath; The third Earl of Burlington; Charles Douglas, 3rd Duke of Queensberry; Prince William, Duke of Cumberland

John Gay (30 June 1685 – 4 December 1732) was an English poet and dramatist and member of the Scriblerus Club. He is best remembered for The Beggar's Opera (1728), a ballad opera. The characters, including Captain Macheath and Polly Peachum, became household names.

== Early life ==
John Gay was born in Barnstaple, England, last of five children of William Gay (died 1695) and Katherine (died 1694), daughter of Jonathan Hanmer, "the leading Nonconformist divine of the town" as founder of the Independent Dissenting congregation in Barnstaple.

The Gay family – "fairly comfortable ... though far from rich" – lived in "a large house, called the Red Cross, on the corner of Joy Street". The Gay family was "of respectable antiquity" in North Devon, associated with the manor of Goldsworthy at Parkham and with the parish of Frithelstock (where the senior line remained, resident at the priory Cloister Hall with its lands, until 1823) and became "powerful and numerous" in the town, "established among Barnstaple's leading families for generations".

Gay's great-grandfather, Anthony Gay, served as Mayor; his wife, Elizabeth, was daughter of the merchant and three-time Mayor of Barnstaple, Richard Beaple.

Gay was educated at the town's grammar school. On leaving school – his elder brother, Jonathan, an Army officer, having inherited the family property – Gay was apprenticed to a silk mercer in London, but being weary, according to Samuel Johnson, "of either the restraint or the servility of his occupation", he soon returned to Barnstaple, where he was educated by his uncle, the Rev. John Hanmer, the nonconformist minister of the town. He then returned to London.

== Early career ==
His first play, The Mohocks (1712), had censorship issues. The following year he wrote a comedy The Wife of Bath, which appeared at the Drury Lane Theatre.

The dedication of his Rural Sports (1713) to Alexander Pope began a lasting friendship with him. In 1714, Gay wrote The Shepherd's Week, a series of six pastorals drawn from English rustic life. Pope had urged him to undertake this in order to ridicule the Arcadian pastorals of Ambrose Philips, who had been praised by a short-lived contemporary publication The Guardian, to the neglect of Pope's claim to be the first pastoral writer of the age and the true English Theocritus. Gay's pastorals achieved this goal and his ludicrous pictures of the English country lads and their loves were found to be entertaining on their own account.

In 1713 Gay and Pope both joined the Scriblerus Club, a group of Tory writers supportive of first minister Robert Harley that also included John Arbuthnot, Jonathan Swift and Thomas Parnell.

=== Diplomatic service ===
In 1714 Gay was appointed secretary to the Earl of Clarendon, the new British ambassador to the Electorate of Hanover, through the influence of Swift. However, the death of Queen Anne three months later put an end to his hopes of official employment.

The mission had been an unsuccessful attempt by the Tories to ingratiate themselves with Elector George, heir to the throne, who was angry that the Peace of Utrecht had led to Britain abandoning its allies in the war against France and suspected that the Tory leadership favoured the Jacobites.

The Hanoverian succession led to the ousting of the Harley Ministry and establishment of the Whig oligarchy, and Gay never held a government post again. While in Hanover, he met Caroline of Ansbach, the future Princess of Wales, and Henrietta Howard, who would become a close friend of his.

=== Return to London ===
In 1715, probably with some help from Pope, Gay produced The What D'Ye Call It?, a dramatic skit on contemporary tragedy, with special reference to Thomas Otway's Venice Preserv'd. This appeared on 23 February 1715 as an afterpiece at Drury Lane to Nicholas Rowe's tragedy Jane Shore. It left the public so ignorant of its inner meaning that Lewis Theobald and Benjamin Griffin published a Complete Key to What D'Ye Call It to explain it. The play also featured a ballad, Twas When the Seas Were Roaring, co-written with George Frideric Handel, which became popular in its own right.

In 1716 appeared his Trivia, or the Art of Walking the Streets of London, a poem in three books, for which he acknowledged receiving several hints from Swift. It contains graphic and humorous descriptions of the London of that period, depicting the city with photographic accuracy and acting as a guide to the upper-class and upper-middle-class walkers of society. By taking a mock-heroic form, Gay's poem was able to poke fun at the notion of complete reformation of street civility, while also proposing an idea of reform in terms of the attitude towards walking. In January 1717 he produced a comedy, Three Hours After Marriage, which was thought to be grossly indecent (without being amusing) and a failure. He had assistance from Pope and John Arbuthnot, but they allowed it to be assumed that Gay was the sole author.

By 1717 Gay was associated with George, Prince of Wales, who as part of the Whig Split had set up a rival court to his father the King which was frequented by opposition Whigs and Tories. In 1718 he collaborated with Handel on the masque Acis and Galatea for which he supplied the libretto.

== Patrons ==
Gay had numerous patrons, and in 1720 he published Poems on Several Occasions by subscription, taking in £1000 or more. In that year James Craggs, the secretary of state, presented him with some South Sea stock. Gay, disregarding the advice of Pope and others of his friends, invested all his money in South Sea stock, and, holding on to the end of the South Sea Bubble, he lost everything. The shock is said to have made him dangerously ill. His friends did not fail him at this juncture. He had patrons in William Pulteney, afterwards Earl of Bath, in the third Earl of Burlington, who constantly entertained him at Chiswick or at Burlington House, and in the Duke and Duchess of Queensberry. He was a frequent visitor with Pope, and received unvarying kindness from William Congreve and John Arbuthnot.

In 1727 he wrote for six-year-old Prince William, later the Duke of Cumberland, Fifty-one Fables in Verse, for which he naturally hoped to gain some preferment, although he has much to say in them of the servility of courtiers and the vanity of court honours. He was offered the situation of gentleman-usher to the Princess Louisa, who was also still a child. He refused this offer, all his friends seemingly having regarded it- "for no very obvious reason"- as an indignity. His friends thought him unfairly neglected, but Gay, who had never rendered any special services to the court, had nevertheless been given a sinecure as lottery commissioner with a salary of £150 a year in 1722, and from 1722 to 1729 had lodgings in the palace at Whitehall.

== The Beggar's Opera ==
He certainly did nothing to conciliate the favour of the government by his next work, The Beggar's Opera, a ballad opera produced on 29 January 1728 by John Rich, in which Sir Robert Walpole was caricatured. This famous piece, which was said to have made "Rich gay and Gay rich", was an innovation in many respects.

The satire of the play has a double allegory. The character of Peachum was inspired by the thief-taker Jonathan Wild, executed in 1725, and the principal figure of Macheath reflected memories of the French highwayman, Claude Duval, whose execution had created a sensation in London, and who exemplified the flamboyance and gallantry of Gay's literary hero. Gay's decision to launch the work was probably also influenced by the huge interest that Jack Sheppard, a cockney housebreaker, had created in all things relating to Newgate Prison. However, the character of Peachum was also understood to represent Robert Walpole, who, like Wild, was seen as a public but morally dubious character, and whose government had been tolerant of Wild's thievery and the South Sea directors' escape from punishment. Under cover of the thieves and highwaymen who figured in it was disguised a satire on society, for Gay made it plain that in describing the moral code of his characters he had in mind the corruptions of the governing class. Part of the success of The Beggar's Opera may have been due to the acting of Lavinia Fenton, afterwards Duchess of Bolton, in the part of Polly Peachum. The airs of the Beggar's Opera in part allude to well-known popular ballads, and Gay's lyrics sometimes play with their wording in order to amuse and entertain the audience.

The play ran for sixty-two nights. Swift is said to have suggested the subject, and Pope and Arbuthnot were constantly consulted while the work was in progress, but Gay must be regarded as the sole author. After seeing an early version of the work, Swift was optimistic of its commercial prospects but famously warned Gay to be cautious with his earnings: "I beg you will be thrifty and learn to value a shilling."

== Later career ==
He wrote a sequel, Polly, relating the adventures of Polly Peachum in the West Indies; its production was forbidden by the Lord Chamberlain, no doubt through the influence of Walpole. This act of "oppression" caused no loss to Gay. It proved an excellent advertisement for Polly, which was published by subscription in 1729, and brought its author several thousand pounds. The Duchess of Queensberry was dismissed from court for enlisting subscribers in the palace. In 1730 Gay's substantially rewritten version of his 1713 play The Wife of Bath appeared at the Lincoln's Inn Fields Theatre, lasting for three nights.

The Duke of Queensberry gave Gay a home, and the duchess continued her affectionate patronage until Gay's death in London on 4 December 1732. He was buried in Westminster Abbey. The epitaph on his tomb is by Pope, and is followed by Gay's own mocking couplet:

Life is a jest, and all things show it,
I thought so once, but now I know it.

== Works ==
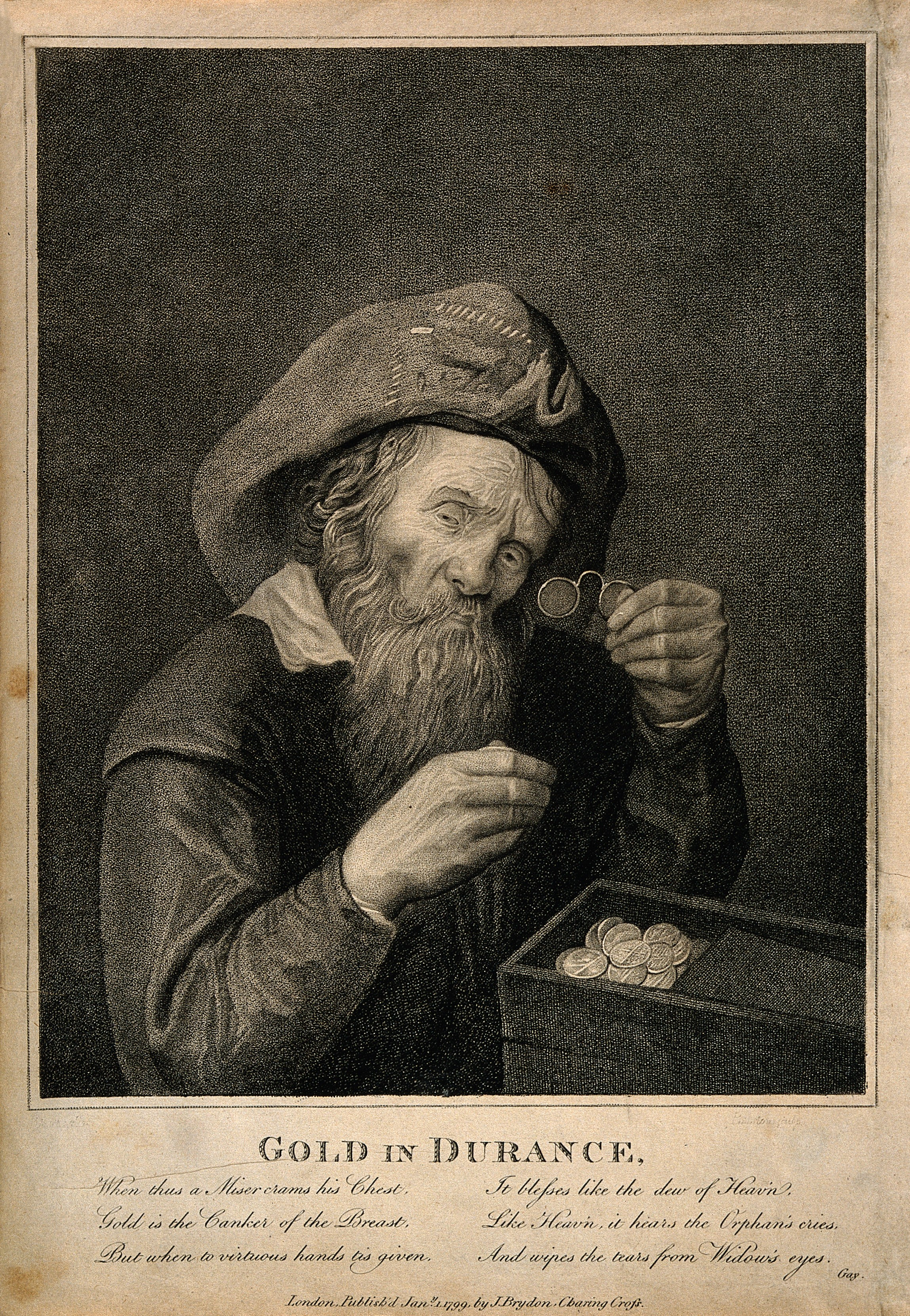
"Gold in Durance." A miser looks at his hoard of gold through his spectacles, with six lines of poetry by John Gay.

Among Gay's works are:

- Wine – 1708
- The Present State of Wit – 1711
- The Wife of Bath – 1713
- The Rural Sports – 1713
- The Shepherd's Week – 1714
- The What D'Ye Call It – 1715
- Trivia, or The Art of Walking the Streets of London – 1716
- Three Hours After Marriage – 1717
- Acis and Galatea – 1718
- Dione – 1720
- Poems on Several Occasions – 1720
- The Captives – 1724
- Fables (also known as Fifty-one Fables in Verse or Fables of John Gay) – 1727 (Part the Second – 1738)
- The Beggar's Opera – 1728
- Polly – 1729
- Achilles – 1733
- The Distress'd Wife – 1743
