= Elizabeth Barry =

English actress (1658–1713)

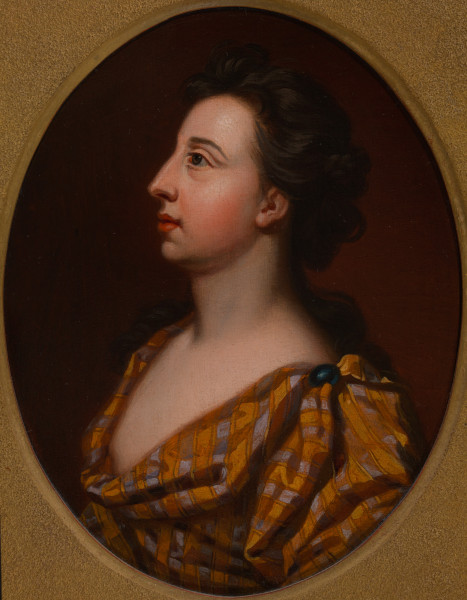
Elizabeth Barry (after Sir Godfrey Kneller) changed "like Nature which she represents, from Passion to Passion, from Extream to Extream, with piercing Force and with easy Grace".

Elizabeth Barry (1658 – 7 November 1713) was an English actress of the Restoration period.

Elizabeth Barry's biggest influence on Restoration drama was her presentation of performing as the tragic actress. She worked in large, prestigious London theatre companies throughout her successful career: from 1675 in the Duke's Company, 1682–1695 in the monopoly United Company, and from 1695 onwards as a member of the actors' cooperative usually known as Betterton's Company, of which she was one of the original shareholders. Her stage career began 15 years after the first-ever professional actresses had replaced Shakespeare's boy heroines on the London stage.

The actor Thomas Betterton said that her acting gave "success to plays that would disgust the most patient reader", and the critic and playwright John Dennis described her as "that incomparable Actress changing like Nature which she represents, from Passion to Passion, from Extream to Extream, with piercing Force and with easy Grace".

== Early career ==
Barry's first performance was at the age of 17 in Thomas Otway's Alcibiades. Her performance was so poor that she was fired from the Duke's Company. She then met John Wilmot, 2nd Earl of Rochester. Their relationship grew from professional colleagues to lovers. They had one child named Elizabeth, who was born in 1677 and died in 1689.

Barry drew on her relationship with Rochester for many of her sexual performances. While multiple sources confirm that Rochester was Barry's lover, the only source for the coaching story is a Life of Barry published in 1741 – 65 years after the events – by Edmund Curll, well known for his fanciful and inaccurate biographies.

Barry was a successful comedian who created a variety of Restoration comedy heroines throughout her career, but her greatest impact on Restoration drama was as a tragic actress. Her capacity for projecting pathos was an inspiration to playwrights Thomas Otway and Thomas Southerne in the three famous tragic roles they wrote for her: Monimia in Otway's The Orphan (1680), Belvidera in Otway's Venice Preserved (1682), and Isabella in Southerne's The Fatal Marriage (1694). These three roles, wrote the prompter John Downes, "gain'd her the Name of Famous Mrs. Barry, both at Court and City, for whenever She Acted any of these three Parts, she forc'd Tears from the Eyes of her Auditory, especially those who have any Sense of Pity for the Distress't."

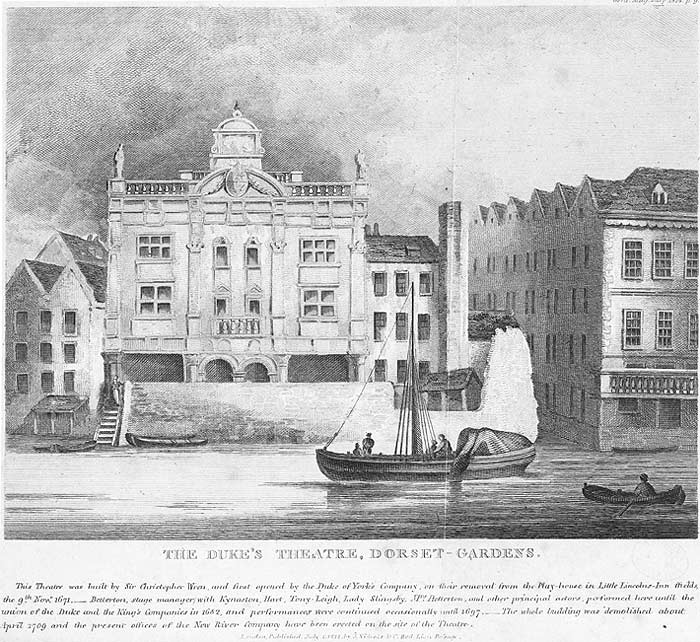
During the first part of her career, Barry worked at the Duke's Theatre at Dorset Gardens, on the riverfront, London's most luxurious playhouse.

In his autobiography, many years later, Colley Cibber recalled the power of her voice: "When distress of Tenderness possess'd her, she subsided into the most affecting Melody and Softness. In the Art of exciting Pity, she had a Power beyond all the Actresses I have yet seen, or what your Imagination can conceive." Elizabeth Howe has argued that it was Barry's success in the role of Monimia that "clinched the movement away from heroic drama and started the establishment of 'she-tragedy' as a popular genre." Also known as pathetic tragedy, this genre represents innocent women as sexual objects and as victims of male lust.

Barry was always described as being a plain woman. Portraits suggest intelligence but heavy features and the playwright Thomas Shadwell writes in a letter in 1692 that it would have been better to have staged Nicholas Brady's The Rape in Roman dress, "and then w'th a Mantle to have covered her hips Mrs Barry would have acted ye part." Apparently, none of this mattered to contemporaries. Even though Barry was "the ugliest Woman" in the world off stage, wrote an anonymous author in A Comparison Between the Two Stages (1702), she was "the finest Woman in the World upon the Stage."

Barry's acting style was embedded in the influences from her own personality and life. Elizabeth as a person was seen to be beautiful and virtuous. Although many of the characters she played were virgins, it was known about her relationship with Rochester. It has also been known that she channeled her sexual relationship with Rochester through many of her performances. Also during this time, it was seen that Barry's body had metaphorical meaning to the description of her character. When Barry starred in The Orphan, it was implied that "the trope of the female breast to represent innocence or ruin (consider the many references to Monimia’s "swelling breasts" or "white breasts"). Thus Otway uses the dismemberment of the female body, expressed through the "mangled breasts besmeared with blood", to signify the ruin of the state".

== Later career ==
Later into Barry’s career, she was given more roles of a motherhood figure than a sexual object. Barry worked for the Duke's Company from 1675 to 1682, taking the role of Cordelia opposite Thomas Betterton's Lear in Nahum Tate's 1681 adaptation of Shakespeare's King Lear. After the Duke's and the King's companies were amalgamated in 1682, she continued as one of the star performers of the new United Company, which remained for 12 years the only theatrical company in London. The absence of rival companies left the actors in a weak bargaining position in relation to management.

One year after her performance in The Fatal Marriage, Barry decided to leave the United Company due to a salary dispute in 1695. She then proceeded to work for a new company with actor Thomas Betterton and actress Anne Bracegirdle. Barry was one of the original patent-holders of the actors' company, which opened at Lincoln's Inn Fields with the smash hit of William Congreve's Love For Love in 1695 and continued to successfully challenge Rich's United Company. There was a huge wage gap between men and woman performers as Betterton was paid £4 and 20s per week and Barry received only £2 and 10s shillings.

Barry officially retired from the stage in 1710 at 52 years old; her acting career lasted a total of 35 years. Her retirement fell short as she died three years later at the age of 55 due to a fever.

== Selected list of plays and roles ==
Play	Playwright	Role
Alcibiades (1675)	Thomas Otway	Draxilla
Mustapha (1676)	Earl of Orrery	Queen Isabelle
The Man of Mode (1676)	George Etherege	Mrs. Loveit
The Wrangling Lovers (1676)	Edward Ravenscroft	Elvira
Titus and Berenice (1676)	Thomas Otway	Phaenice
Tom Essence (1676)	Thomas Rawlins	Theodocia
Madam Fickle (1676)	Thomas D'Urfey	Constantia
The Cheats of Scapin (1676)	Thomas Otway	Lucia
The Rover (1677)	Aphra Behn	Hellena
The French Conjuror (1677)	Thomas Porter	Clorinia
A Fond Husband (1677)	Thomas D'Urfey	Emillia
The Destruction of Troy (1678)	John Banks	Polyxena
Friendship in Fashion (1678)	Thomas Otway	Mrs Goodvile
The Virtuous Wife (1679)	Thomas D'Urfey	Olivia
The Woman Captain (1679)	Thomas Shadwell	Mrs Gripe
Caius Marius (1679)	Thomas Otway	Lavinia
Theodosius (1680)	Nathaniel Lee	Athenais
The Orphan (1680)	Thomas Otway	Monimia
The Princess of Cleve (1680)	Nathaniel Lee	Princess of Cleve
The Revenge (1680)	Aphra Behn	Corina
The Loving Enemies (1680)	Lewis Maidwell	Camilla
Lucius Junius Brutus (1680)	Nathaniel Lee	Teraminta
The London Cuckolds (1681)	Edward Ravenscroft	Arabella
Venice Preserv’d (1682)	Thomas Otway	Belvidera
The City Heiress (1682)	Aphra Behn	Lady Galliard
Constantine the Great (1683)	Nathaniel Lee	Fausta
Sir Courtly Nice (1685)	John Crowne	Leonora
Darius, King of Persia (1688)	John Crowne	Barzana
The Injured Lovers (1688)	William Mountfort	Princess Oryala
Don Sebastian (1689)	John Dryden	Almedya
The Massacre of Paris (1689)	Nathaniel Lee	Marguerite
Amphitryon (1690)	John Dryden	Alcema
Distressed Innocence (1690)	Elkanah Settle	Orundana
Edward III (1690)	William Mountfort	Isabella
The Wives Excuse (1691)	Thomas Southerne	Mrs Friendall
Cleomenes, the Spartan Hero (1692)	John Dryden	Cassandra
The Marriage-Hater Matched (1692)	Thomas D'Urfey	Lady Sutble
Henry II (1692)	William Mountfort	Queen Eleanor
Regulus (1692)	John Crowne	Fulvia
The Maid's Last Prayer (1693)	Thomas Southerne	Lady Malepert
The Old Bachelor (1693)	William Congreve	Laetitia
The Fatal Marriage (1694)	Thomas Southerne	Isabella
The Married Beau (1694)	John Crowne	Mrs Loveley
The Ambitious Slave (1694)	Elkanah Settle	Celestina
Love Triumphant (1694)	John Dryden	Victoria
The She-Gallants (1695)	George Granville	Lady Dorimen
Cyrus the Great (1695)	John Banks	Panthea
Love for Love (1695)	William Congreve	Mrs Frail
The Royal Mischief (1696)	Delariviere Manley	Homais
The City Lady (1696)	Thomas Dilke	Lady Grumble
Boadicea, Queen of Britain (1697)	Charles Hopkins	Boadicea
The Innocent Mistress (1697)	Mary Pix	Bellinda
The Mourning Bride (1697)	William Congreve	Zara
The Intrigues at Versailles: Or, A Jilt in All Humours: A Comedy (1697)	Thomas d'Urfey	Madam de Vandosme
Rinaldo and Armida (1698)	John Dennis	Armida
The False Friend (1699)	Mary Pix	Adellaida
Tamerlane (1701)	Nicholas Rowe	Arpasia
Antiochus the Great (1701)	Jane Wiseman	Leodice
The Fair Penitent (1702)	Nicholas Rowe	Calista
The Biter (1704)	Nicholas Rowe	Mrs Clever
All For Love (1704)	John Dryden	Cleopatra
Ulysses (1705)	Nicholas Rowe	Penelope
Adventures in Madrid (1706)	Mary Pix	Clarinda
The Royal Convert (1707)	Nicholas Rowe	Rodogune

== Fictional portrayals ==
Barry is a supporting character in The Libertine, Stephen Jeffreys' play about John Wilmot's life, as well as its 2004 film adaptation, in which she is portrayed by Samantha Morton. Barry also appears as a character in the 2015 play [exit Mrs Behn] or, The Leo Play by Christopher vanDer Ark.
