= Joseph Harris (stage actor) =

English actor and dramatist

Joseph Harris (c.1650–1715) was an English stage actor and playwright. His earliest known performance was in the United Company's The Bloody Brother in 1685. Earlier mentions an actor named Harris are likely to refer to an earlier lesser-known actor William Harris or even the celebrated Restoration performer Henry Harris. He remained with the United Company until 1695 when he joined Thomas Betterton's breakaway company at the Lincoln's Inn Fields Theatre. He acted there until around 1705, although some reports have him still acting as late as 1715.

He wrote three plays The Mistakes (1690), The City Bride (1696) and Love's a Lottery (1699).

== Selected roles ==
- Bourcher in A Commonwealth of Women by Thomas D'Urfey (1685)
- Downright in The Widow Ranter by Aphra Behn (1689)
- Alberto Gondi in The Massacre of Paris by Nathaniel Lee (1689)
- Guillamar in King Arthur by John Dryden (1691)
- Lanoo in Bussy D'Ambois by Thomas D'Urfey (1691)
- Musick Master in The Wives Excuse by Thomas Southerne (1691)
- Bellford in The Fatal Marriage by Thomas Southerne (1694)
- Pedanty in The City Lady by Thomas Dilke (1696)
- Gentil in The Innocent Mistress by Mary Pix (1697)
- Roderigo in The False Friend by Mary Pix (1699)
- Fedor in The Czar of Muscovy by Mary Pix (1701)

== Bibliography ==
- Highfill, Philip H, Burnim, Kalman A. & Langhans, Edward A. A Biographical Dictionary of Actors, Actresses, Musicians, Dancers, Managers, and Other Stage Personnel in London, 1660-1800. SIU Press, 1982.
- Van Lennep, W. The London Stage, 1660-1800: Volume One, 1660-1700. Southern Illinois University Press, 1960.
