= William Burnaby (writer) =

English writer (1673–1706)

William Burnaby (1673–1706) was an English writer, primarily known for authoring several plays in the early eighteenth century. Three of his works were late entries into the Restoration Comedy tradition.

The son of a London brewer also named William Burnaby, he attended Magdalen College, Oxford, from 1691 and then the Middle Temple. Following this he turned to playwriting, having plays produced by the major London theatres at Drury Lane and the Lincoln's Inn Fields Theatre. His works include The Ladies Visiting Day. The Modish Husband (1702) and Love Betrayed (1703).

He died at the age of thirty three, and is buried in Westminster Abbey.

In 1931 the complete The Dramatic Works of William Burnaby was published.

== Bibliography ==
- Burnett, Mark Thornton. Edinburgh Companion to Shakespeare and the Arts. Edinburgh University Press, 2011.
- Dugas, Don-John. Marketing the Bard: Shakespeare in Performance and Print, 1660–1740. University of Missouri Press, 2006.
- Lowerre, Kathryn. Music and Musicians on the London Stage, 1695–1705. Routledge, 2017.
- Nicoll, Allardyce. History of English Drama, 1660–1900, Volume 2. Cambridge University Press, 2009.
