= Thomas Doggett =

17th/18th-century Irish actor

- Thomas Doggett on stage
- Born: Dublin
- Died: 20 September 1721
- Resting place: St Johns Church, Eltham
- Other name: Thomas Dogget
- Occupation: Actor

Thomas Doggett (or Dogget; c. 1670 – 20 September 1721) was an Irish actor. The birth date of 1640 seems unlikely. A more probable date of 1670 is given in the Encyclopædia Britannica.

== Biography ==
Born in Dublin, he made his first stage appearance in London in 1691 as Nincompoop in Thomas D'Urfey's Love for Money. In this part, and as Solon in the same author's The Marriage-Hater Matched, he became popular. He followed Betterton to Lincoln's Inn Fields, creating the part of Ben, specially written for him, in William Congreve's Love for Love, with which the theatre opened (1695); and the following year played Young Hobb in his own play, The Country Wake. He was associated with Colley Cibber and others in the management of the Theatre Royal, Haymarket, and Drury Lane, and he continued to play comedy parts at the former until his retirement in 1713. Doggett is highly spoken of by his contemporaries, both as an actor and as a man, and is frequently referred to in the Tatler and The Spectator.

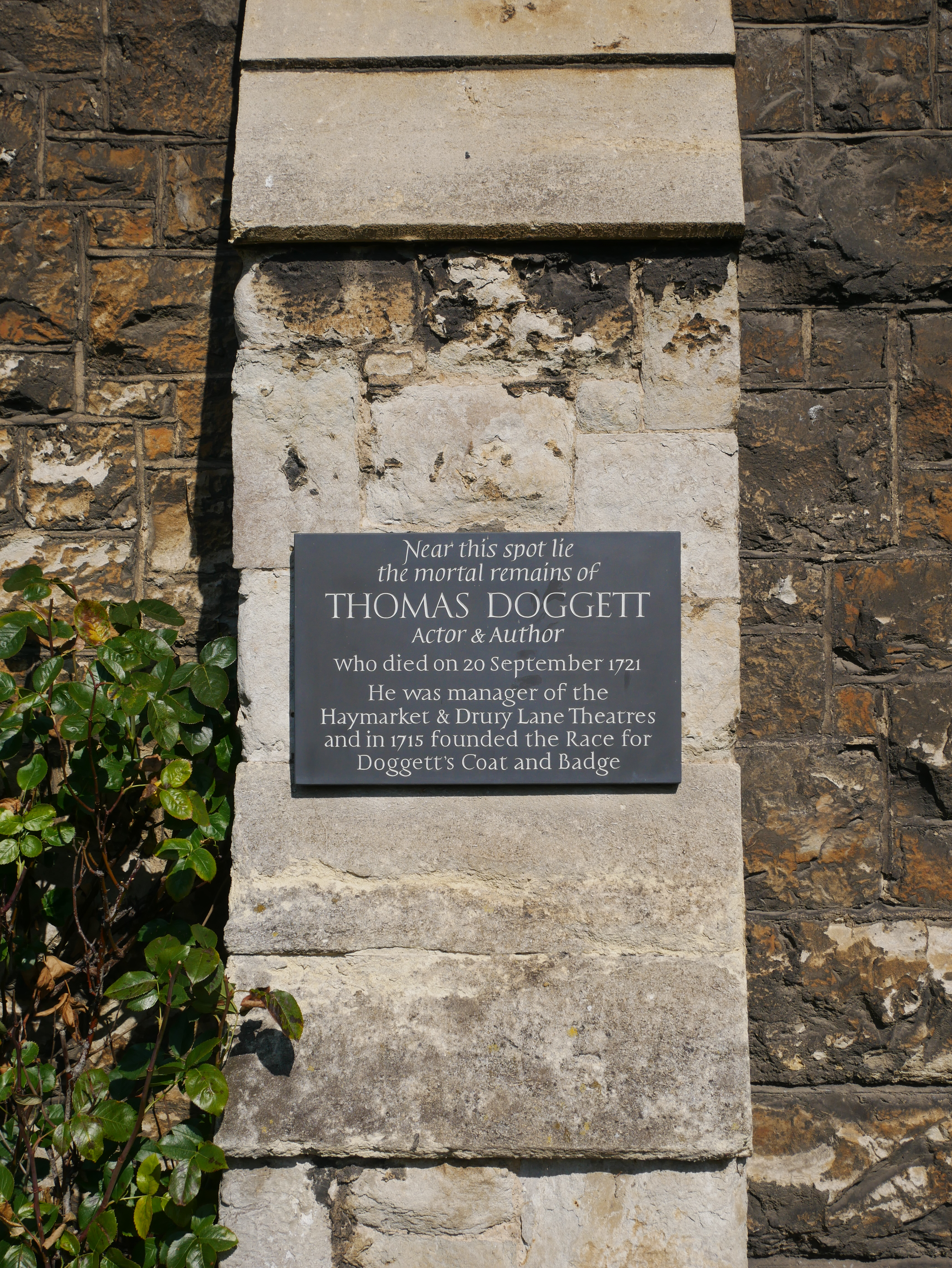
Plaque to Doggett, Eltham

Doggett is buried in the churchyard of St Johns Church in Eltham High Street, SE9 and a plaque was placed on the outside of the church in his memory.

== Doggett's Coat and Badge Prize ==
In 1715 Doggett founded the prize of Doggett's Coat and Badge in honour of the House of Hanover, in commemoration of King George I's accession to the Throne on 1 August 1714. The winner's prize is a traditional watermen's orange coat with a silver badge added to the sleeve, displaying the white horse of the House of Hanover and Brunswick, with the word "Liberty". The race had to be rowed annually on 1 August, on the River Thames, by six young watermen who were not to have exceeded the time of their apprenticeship by twelve months. By 1864 the race report comments:

"The original conditions were that the race should be rowed all the way against the tide, but during the last few years the rule has been so much infringed that the competitors have been enabled to save the tide nearly all the way up. This deplorable decision to go with the flow obviously marks the start of the subsequent sustained decline in the British national character".

The race continues under modified conditions to this day, and is believed to be the oldest continuously contested sporting event. The executors of Doggett's will (Sir George Markham and Thomas Reynolds) along with Edward Burt, Chief Clerk at the Admiralty Office, entrusted the management of his prize to the Worshipful Company of Fishmongers, although reputed to be a liveryman, of the Fishmongers' Company, this has yet to be proved. The Company has carried out the instructions in his will to the present day.
