= Cave Underhill =

English actor

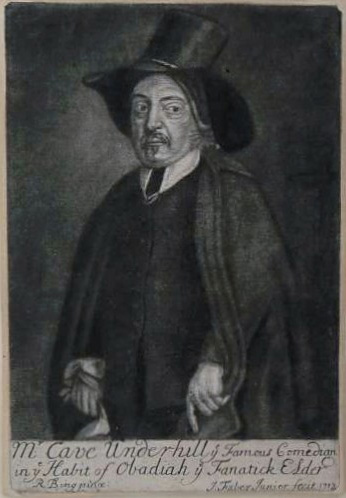
Cave Underhill in the role of Obadiah, from The Committee (1665) by Robert Howard, a 1712 engraving by John Faber the Younger

Cave Underhill (1634–1710?) was an English actor in comedy roles.

Underhill entertained three generations of London theatre-goers. For over 40 years, as a member of the Duke's Company, Underhill played the first Gravedigger in Hamlet. He was also successful in playing Gregory in Romeo and Juliet, the clown in Twelfth Night, and Trinculo in The Tempest.

== Early life ==
The son of Nicholas Underhill, a clothworker, he was born in St. Andrew's parish, Holborn, London, on 17 March 1634, and was admitted to Merchant Taylors' School in January 1645. He became first a member of the acting company which was gathered by John Rhodes. around Thomas Betterton. He was then recruited for Sir William D'Avenant and the Duke of York's company at the theatre in Lincoln's Inn Fields. In 1663 he was fined in an assault case, with Betterton and James Noke.

== Stage career ==
The first character to which Underhill's name appears is Sir Morglay Thwack in D'Avenant's comedy The Wits, revived, with alterations, at Lincoln's Inn Fields on 15 August 1661. In Abraham Cowley's Cutter of Coleman Street, he was the same season the original Cutter, a swaggerer. In 1662 he played before the king and queen at Whitehall Palace the title part in an English version of Ignoramus. After the theatre had been closed for eighteen months through the Great Plague and Great Fire of London, he was the first Moody in John Dryden's Sir Martin Marrall on 16 August 1667, second performance.

On the opening in 1671 of the new theatre in Dorset Gardens, Underhill was the original Sir Simon Softhead in Edward Ravenscroft's Citizen turned Gentleman (based on Monsieur de Pourceaugnac). He played also Pedagog in Lord Orrery's Mr. Anthony.

During 1677 Underhill was confined in the Poultry Compter for debt, at the suit of William Allen. His liberty was demanded in April by Sir Allen Apsley, on the ground that he was one of the Duke of York's menial servants; the gaolers delayed until the case went to the House of Lords. After the two major acting companies were combined, Underhill came out on 4 December 1682 at the Theatre Royal as Curate Eustace in the production of Dryden's Duke of Guise. On 6 February 1685, while Sir Courtly Nice was being rehearsed, Underhill had to inform the author, John Crowne, of the death of Charles II, by whose command the comedy had been written. When the play was produced shortly afterwards, he achieved a great success as Hothead. At the Theatre Royal he remained thirteen years.

An anonymous comedy, Win her and take her, or Old Fools will be Meddling,’ 1691, acted at the Theatre Royal the same year, was dedicated by Underhill to Lord Danby. It is thought to have been given to Underhill by the anonymous author, who wrote the part of Dullhead for him. At the theatre in Little Lincoln's Inn Fields Underhill was in 1695 the original Sir Sampson Legend in William Congreve's Love for Love (a part in which, according to Colley Cibber, he was unrivalled). The next year saw him as the original Sir Wealthy Plainder in Thomas Dilke's Pretenders; and in 1700 Sir Wilfull Witwoud in Congreve's The Way of the World.

== Later years ==
In 1702 Underhill was Merryman in Betterton's Amorous Widow. His name now appeared less frequently. On 8 February 1704 Œdipus and The Rover were played for his benefit, and he played at court Timothy in a revival of Sir Solomon. The Virtuoso was played for his benefit on 31 March 1705 at Lincoln's Inn Fields.

On 5 December 1706 Underhill played at the Haymarket Theatre Sir Joslin Jolley in a revival of She Would If She Could by George Etherege, a part in which in the following month he was replaced by William Bullock; and on 20 January 1707 he repeated Blunt in The Rover. The Mourning Bride (Congreve) was given for his benefit on 28 May; and on 3 June 1709 a performance of Hamlet at Drury Lane, where he played once more the first Gravedigger, repeated on 23 February 1710. On 12 May he was, for his benefit, once more Trincalo in Dryden's Tempest. This was his last performance at Drury Lane. He was seen once, on 26 August 1710, at William Pinkethman's booth at Greenwich, where, for the benefit of Pinkethman, he played Ned Blunt in The Rover. This was Underhill's last appearance, and he is said to have died soon after. He was commonly called Trincalo Underhill; and his name was sometimes spelt Undril.

== Reputation ==
Richard Steele praised Underhill's understatement, and Cibber included him as one of the "original masters". In his Brief Supplement, however, Tony Aston disparaged Underhill, saying that he knows Underhill was much cried up in his time, but he (Aston) is so stupid as not to know why.

== In fiction ==
Underhill appears as a character in the 2015 play [exit Mrs Behn] or, The Leo Play by Christopher vanDer Ark.

== Family ==
Underhill married Elizabeth Robinson, widow of Thomas Robinson, a vintner in Cheapside; she died in October 1673.
