= 1715 in poetry =

List of years in poetry	(table)
- … 1705; 1706; 1707; 1708; 1709; 1710; 1711; 1712; 1713; 1714; 1715; 1716; 1717; 1718; 1719; 1720; 1721; 1722; 1723; 1724; 1725 …
- In literature 1712 1713 1714 1715 1716 1717 1718
- Art; Archaeology; Architecture; Literature; Music; Philosophy; Science; +...

Nationality words link to articles with information on the nation's poetry or literature (for instance, Irish or France).

== Events ==
- Nicholas Rowe made British Poet Laureate in succession to Nahum Tate.
- Mary Monck, dying in Bath, England, writes affecting verses to her husband, not published until 1755.

== Works published ==
=== United Kingdom ===
- Susanna Centlivre, A Poem. Humbly Presented to His most Sacred Majesty George, King of Great Britain, France and Ireland. Upon His Ascension to the Throne
- Charles Cotton, The Genuine Works of Charles Cotton, posthumously published
- Samuel Croxall, The Vision
- Daniel Defoe, published anonymously, attributed to Defoe, A Hymn to the Mob
- Alexander Pope:
- The Temple of Fame
- Translator, The Iliad of Homer, Volume I (Books 1–4), followed by Volume II (Biooks 5–8) in 1716, Volume III (Books 9–12) in 1717, Volume IV (Books 13–16) in 1718, Volume V (Books 14–21) and Volume VI (Books 22–24), both in 1720
- Matthew Prior, Solomon, or The Vanity of the World, a didactic poem
- Thomas Tickell, translation, The First Book of Homer's Iliad
- Isaac Watts, Divine Songs Attempted in Easy Language for the Use of Children, including "How doth the little busy Bee"; 10 editions published by 1753

=== Other ===
- Antoine Houdart de La Motte, Réflexions sur la critique, attacking those who admire the ancients uncritically; criticism in France

== Births ==
Death years link to the corresponding "[year] in poetry" article:

- February 12 – William Whitehead (died 1785), English poet and playwright
- March 7 – Ewald Christian von Kleist (died 1759), German poet
- May 4 – Richard Graves (died 1804), English poet and novelist
- July 4 – Christian Fürchtegott Gellert (died 1769), German poet
- October 1 – Richard Jago (died 1781), English clergyman and poet
- November 5 – John Brown (died 1766), English clergyman, author and poet
- Undated
  - Tadhg Gaelach Ó Súilleabháin (died 1795), Irish poet
  - Jakob Immanuel Pyra (died 1744), German poet

== Deaths ==
Birth years link to the corresponding "[year] in poetry" article:

- May 19 – Charles Montagu, 1st Earl of Halifax (born 1661), English poet and statesman
- July 30 – Nahum Tate (born 1652), Irish-born Poet Laureate
- Undated – Mary Monck (born c. 1677), Anglo-Irish poet

== See also ==
- Poetry
- List of years in poetry
- List of years in literature
- 18th century in poetry
- 18th century in literature
- Augustan poetry
- Scriblerus Club

== Notes ==
- "A Timeline of English Poetry". Representative Poetry Online. University of Toronto.
