= 1713 in poetry =

List of years in poetry	(table)
- … 1703; 1704; 1705; 1706; 1707; 1708; 1709; 1710; 1711; 1712; 1713; 1714; 1715; 1716; 1717; 1718; 1719; 1720; 1721; 1722; 1723 …
- In literature 1710 1711 1712 1713 1714 1715 1716
- Art; Archaeology; Architecture; Literature; Music; Philosophy; Science; +...

Nationality words link to articles with information on the nation's poetry or literature (for instance, Irish or French).

== Events ==
- First printing of Vitsentzos Kornaros's early 17th century Cretan Greek romantic epic poem Erotokritos (Ἐρωτόκριτος), in Venice.

== Works published ==
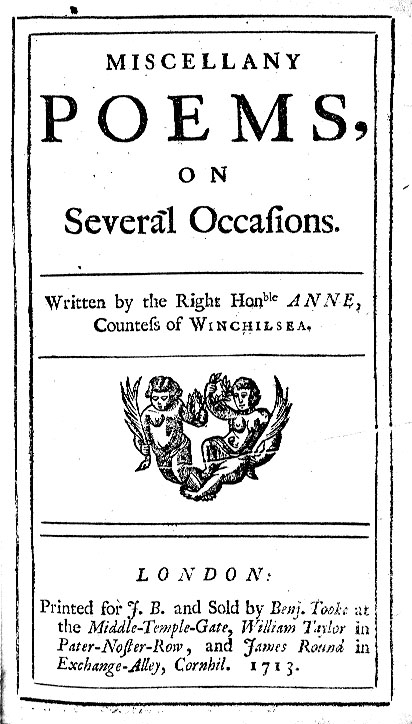
Anne Finch's Miscellany Poems on Several Occasions

- Henry Carey, Poems on Several Occasions, including "Sally in our Alley", and "Namby-Pamby", written to ridicule Ambrose Philips
- Samuel Croxall, An original canto of Spencer: design'd as part of his Faerie Queene, but never printed (political satire)
- Abel Evans, Vertumnus
- Anne Finch, countess of Winchelsea, "Written by a Lady", Miscellany Poems on Several Occasions
- John Gay:
  - Rural Sports
  - The Fan (published this year, although the book states "1714")
- Alexander Pope:
  - Ode For Musick
  - Ode on St. Cecilia's Day
  - Windsor-Forest
- Richard Steere, The Daniel Catcher, including "Earth Felicities", a poem in blank verse, an unusual form for the time, and "Caelestial Embassy", a nativity poem that criticized the Puritan rejection of Christmas, English Colonial America
- Jonathan Swift, published anonymously, Part of the Seventh Epistle of the First Book of Horace Imitated
- Joseph Trapp, Peace
- John Wilmot, Earl of Rochester, Poems on Several Occasions. "By the R. H. the E. of R.", London, posthumous
- Edward Young:
  - An Epistle to the Right Honourable the Lord Lansdown
  - A Poem on the Last Day

== Births ==
Death years link to the corresponding "[year] in poetry" article:

- September 13 – Giuseppe Maria Buondelmonti (died 1757), Italian poet, orator and philosopher
- September 18 – Samuel Cobb (born 1675), English poet and critic
- December 18 (bapt.) – Thomas Gilbert (died 1766), English satirical poet and rake
- Luise Adelgunde Victoria Gottsched (died 1762), German
- Khwaja Muhammad Zaman (died 1774), Indian, Sindhi-language poet
- 1713 or 1714 – George Smith of Chichester (died 1776), English landscape painter and poet

== Deaths ==
Birth years link to the corresponding "[year] in poetry" article:

- February 14 – William Harrison (born 1685), English poet and diplomat
- May 20 – Thomas Sprat (born 1635), English bishop and poet
- September 6 – François-Séraphin Régnier-Desmarais (born 1632), French ecclesiastic, grammarian, diplomat and poet in French, Spanish and Latin

== See also ==
- Poetry
- List of years in poetry
- List of years in literature
- 18th century in poetry
- 18th century in literature
- Augustan poetry
- Scriblerus Club

== Notes ==
- "A Timeline of English Poetry" Web page of the Representative Poetry Online Web site, University of Toronto
