= 1717 in poetry =

List of years in poetry	(table)
- … 1707; 1708; 1709; 1710; 1711; 1712; 1713; 1714; 1715; 1716; 1717; 1718; 1719; 1720; 1721; 1722; 1723; 1724; 1725; 1726; 1727 …
- In literature 1714 1715 1716 1717 1718 1719 1720
- Art; Archaeology; Architecture; Literature; Music; Philosophy; Science; +...

Nationality words link to articles with information on the nation's poetry or literature (for instance, Irish or France).

== Events ==
- January - Three Hours After Marriage, a play written by Alexander Pope, John Gay and John Arbuthnot, was staged this year. The play satirized poet and critic John Dennis as "Sir Tremendous Longinus the Critic", Lady Winchilsea as "Clinkett the poetess" and Colley Cibber as "Plotwell". The play was met with massive criticism and had a short run, mortifying Pope. (see Dennis, Parnell and Pope, in "Works published")

== Works published ==
- Joseph Addison, John Dryden, Laurence Eusden, Sir Samuel Garth, John Gay, Alexander Pope and Nicholas Rowe, among others, Ovid's Metamorphoses
- John Durant Breval, published anonymously, The Art of Dress
- Susanna Centlivre, published anonymously, An Epistle to the King of Sweden
- John Dennis, Remarks upon Mr Pope's Translation of Homer In this continuation of the long-running feud between the author and Alexander Pope, Dennis' prose critique mixes bad-faith, petty criticisms with some insights that anticipate Matthew Arnold's thoughts on translating Homer into English, and James Russell Lowell's criticism of Pope's use of the heroic couplet. "The Homer which Lintot prints does not talk like Homer but like Pope," Dennis wrote, noting the simplicity of the original and the artificiality of the translation. Included in the same pamphlet were Dennis' criticisms of Windsor Forest and Temple of Fame. Dennis' criticism was published in February, and he in turn was attacked by Parnell in May (see below); after which Dennis and Pope reconciled, maintaining peace until a new outbreak of their conflict in 1728.
- Wentworth Dillon, 4th Earl of Roscommon and others, Poems by the Earl of Roscomon (sic)
- Elijah Fenton, Poems on Several Occasions
- Jane Holt (née Jane Wiseman), this volume published under the name "Mrs. Holt" and believed to be Jane Holt, A Fairy Tale Inscrib'd, to the Honourable Mrs. W—, with other Poems
- Thomas Parnell, Homer's Battle of the Frogs and Mice. With the Remarks of Zolius. To which is prefixed, the Life of the said Zolius, an attack on John Dennis (see above)
- Alexander Pope:
  - Translator, Homer's Iliad, Book III this year, preceded by Book I in 1715, Book II in 1716 and to be followed by Books IV in 1718, and V-VI in 1720.
  - The Works of Mr. Alexander Pope (with new material), including:
    - "Eloisa to Abelard"
    - "Verses to the Memory of an Unfortunate Lady"
- Thomas Purney, A Full Enquiry into the True Nature of Pastoral (part of the Pope/Philips quarrel)
- Thomas Tickell, published anonymously, An Epistle from a Lady in England; to a Gentleman at Avignon
- Ned Ward (also known as "Edward Ward")
  - British Wonders; or, A Poetical Description of the Several Prodigies [...] That Have Happen'd in Britain Since the Death of Queen Anne, published anonymously
  - A Collection of Historical and State Poems, Satyrs, Songs, and Epigrams

== Births ==
Death years link to the corresponding "[year] in poetry" article:

- c. February 11 – William Williams Pantycelyn (died 1791), Welsh poet, prose and hymn writer, a leader of the Welsh Methodist revival
- February 14 – Richard Owen Cambridge (died 1802), English poet
- November 25 – Alexander Sumarokov (died 1777), Russian poet and playwright
- December 16 – Elizabeth Carter (died 1806), English Bluestocking poet, classical scholar and translator
- date not known – Molla Panah Vagif (died 1797), Azerbaijani poet

== Deaths ==
Birth years link to the corresponding "[year] in poetry" article:

- July 16 – John Smith (born 1662), English poet and playwright
- December 13 – Nicholas Noyes (born 1647), English Colonial American clergyman, one of those presiding over the Salem witch trials, and poet
- William Diaper (born 1685), English poet
- Jane Holt, née Wiseman (born c. 1682), English actress, poet and playwright

== See also ==
- Poetry
- List of years in poetry
- List of years in literature
- 18th century in poetry
- 18th century in literature
- Augustan poetry
- Scriblerus Club

== Notes ==
- "A Timeline of English Poetry" Web page of the Representative Poetry Online Web site, University of Toronto
