= 1714 in poetry =

List of years in poetry	(table)
- … 1704; 1705; 1706; 1707; 1708; 1709; 1710; 1711; 1712; 1713; 1714; 1715; 1716; 1717; 1718; 1719; 1720; 1721; 1722; 1723; 1724 …
- In literature 1711 1712 1713 1714 1715 1716 1717
- Art; Archaeology; Architecture; Literature; Music; Philosophy; Science; +...

Nationality words link to articles with information on the nation's poetry or literature (for instance, Irish or France).

== Events ==
- March – The Scriblerus Club, an informal group of literary friends, is formed by Jonathan Swift, Alexander Pope, John Gay, John Arbuthnot (at whose London house they meet), Thomas Parnell, Henry St. John and Robert Harley.
- End – Venetian sea-captain Julije Balović begins compilation of the Perast Chronicle, a collection of epic poetry.

== Works published ==
=== United Kingdom ===
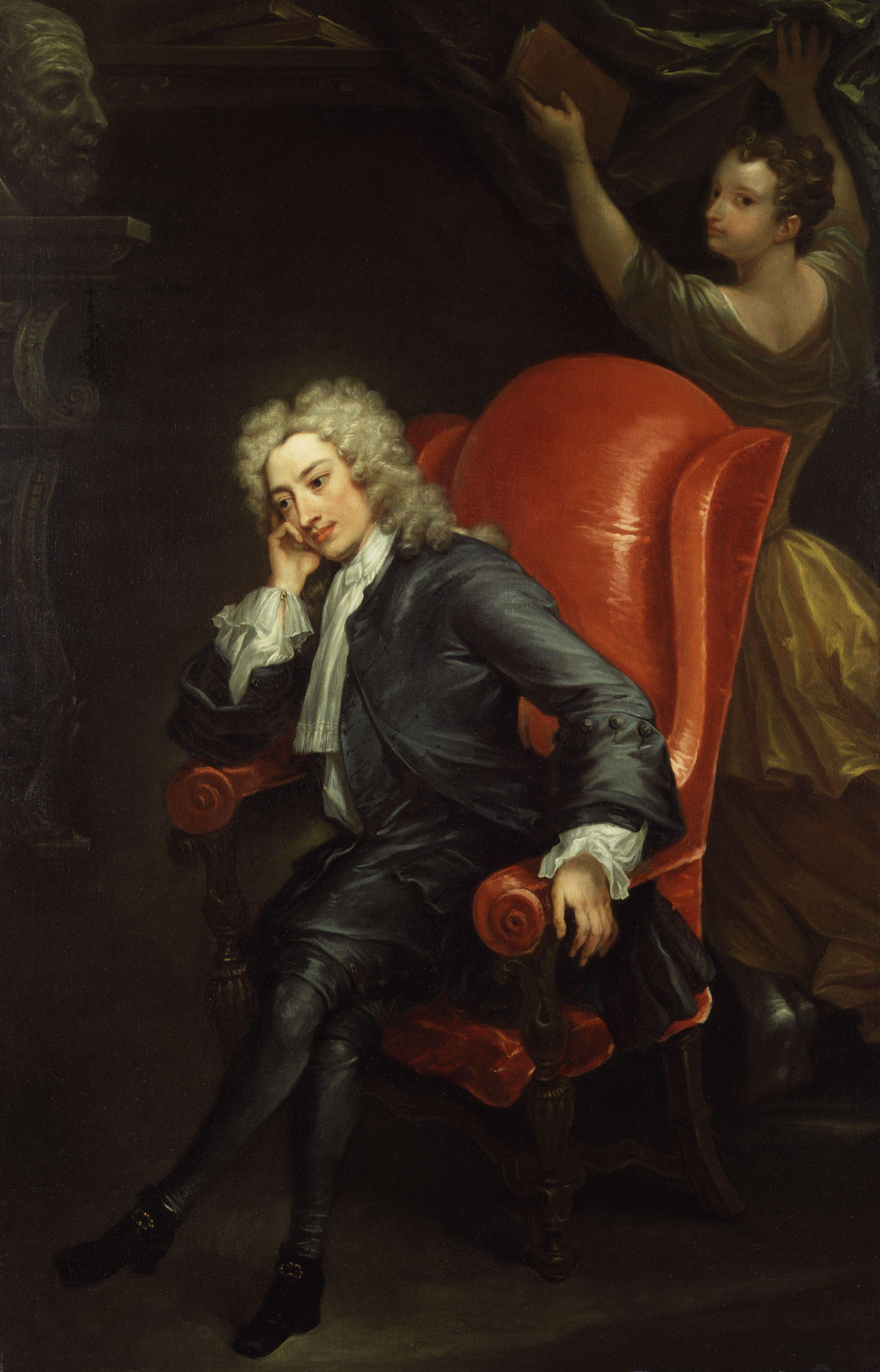
Alexander Pope, painted by Charles Jervas sometime from 1713 to 1715

- John Danforth (poet), "A Poem, Upon the Much Honoured [...] Mrs. Maria Mather", English, Colonial America
- William Diaper, An Imitation of the Seventeenth Epistle of the First Book of Horace
- Laurence Eusden, A Letter to Mr. Addison, on the King's Accession to the Throne
- Abel Evans, Prae-existence: A poem, in imitation of Milton
- John Gay:
  - The Shepherd's Week (pastoral)
  - The Fan
- Samuel Jones, Poetical Miscellanies on Several Occasions
- Alexander Pope, The Rape of the Lock: An heroi-comical poem, first edition in an enlarged, five-canto form (see also Miscellaneoous Poems and Translations 1712
- Nicholas Rowe, Poems on Several Occasions
- Richard Steele:
  - Editor, Poetical Miscellanies, including pieces by Alexander Pope, Thomas Parnell, Thomas Tickell, John Gay, Thomas Warton, Edward Young and Richard Steele himself
  - Editor, "Written by a lady", The Ladies Library, anthology sometimes attributed to Mary Wray, to Steele and to George Berkeley
- Jonathan Swift, The First Ode of the Second Book of Horace Paraphras'd, published this year, although the book states "1713"
- John Wilmot, Earl of Rochester, The Works of John Earl of Rochester. Containing Poems, On Several Occasions: His Lordship's Letters To Mr. Savil and Mrs. * * with Valentinian, a Tragedy. Never before Publish'd together, London: Printed for Jacob Tonson, posthumous

=== Other ===
- Antoine Houdart de La Motte, an "improved" version of Homer's Iliad, with a preface critical of the poet; France

== Births ==
Death years link to the corresponding "[year] in poetry" article:

- January 1 – Kristijonas Donelaitis (died 1780), Lithuanian poet
- November 13 – William Shenstone (died 1763, English poet)
- Date not known:
  - Rob Donn (died 1778), Scottish Gaelic poet
  - Georg Luis (died 1792), German poet
  - Elias Caspar Reichard (died 1791), German poet

== Deaths ==
Birth years link to the corresponding "[year] in poetry" article:

- June 25 (buried) – Walter Pope (born 1627), English astronomer and poet
- November 29 – Jerolim Kavanjin (born 1641), Croatian poet
- Nozawa Bonchō 野沢 凡兆 (born c. 1640), Japanese haikai poet
- Benjamin Tompson (born 1642), English Colonial American poet

== See also ==
- Poetry
- List of years in poetry
- List of years in literature
- 18th century in poetry
- 18th century in literature
- Augustan poetry
- Scriblerus Club

== Notes ==
- "A Timeline of English Poetry" Web page of the Representative Poetry Online Web site, University of Toronto
