= 1713 in literature =

List of years in literature	(table)
- … 1703; 1704; 1705; 1706; 1707; 1708; 1709; 1710; 1711; 1712; 1713; 1714; 1715; 1716; 1717; 1718; 1719; 1720; 1721; 1722; 1723 …
- In poetry 1710 1711 1712 1713 1714 1715 1716
- Art; Archaeology; Architecture; Literature; Music; Philosophy; Science; +...

This article contains information about the literary events and publications of 1713.

== Events ==
- March 12 – Richard Steele and Joseph Addison found the short-lived The Guardian; in the same year, Steele founds another periodical, ostensibly as a sequel to it, the likewise short-lived The Englishman.
- April 14 – The first performance is given in London of Addison's libertarian play Cato, a Tragedy, which will be influential on both sides of the Atlantic.
- October – Alexander Pope announces that he is to begin a definitive translation of the works of Homer.
- unknown date – Vitsentzos Kornaros's early 17th-century Cretan romantic epic poem Erotokritos (Ἐρωτόκριτος), is printed, for the first time, in Venice.

== New books ==
=== Prose ===
- John Arbuthnot – Proposals for printing a very curious discourse... a treatise of the art of political lying, with an abstract of the first volume ("The Art of Political Lying")
- Jane Barker – The Amours of Bosvil and Galesia
- Richard Bentley (as Phileleutherus Lipsiensis) – Remarks upon a Late Discourse of Free-thinking (see Collins below)
- George Berkeley – Three Dialogues between Hylas and Philonous
- Nicolas Boileau-Despréaux – Dialogue sur les héros de roman
- Robert Challe – Les Illustres Françaises (The Illustrious French Lovers)
- Anthony Collins – A Discourse of Free-thinking
- Daniel Defoe
  - And What if the Pretender Should Come?
  - A General History of Trade
  - Reasons Against the Succession of the House of Hanover
- John Dennis – Remarks upon Cato
- Abel Evans – Vertumnus
- John Gay
  - Rural Sports
  - The Fan
- Edmund Gibson – Codex Juris Ecclesiastici Anglicani
- Antoine Hamilton – Mémoires du comte de Gramont (published anonymously)
- John Hughes – Letters of Abelard and Heloise (widely published translation)
- Henri Joutel – Journal historique du dernier voyage que feu M. de La Sale fit dans le golfe de Mexique (Joutel's journal of La Salle's last voyage, 1684–1687)
- Thomas Parnell – An Essay on the Different Stiles of Poetry
- Charles-Irénée Castel de Saint-Pierre – Projet pour rendre la paix perpétuelle en Europe
- Jonathan Swift
  - Mr. C--n's Discourse of Free-thinking, Put into Plain English (see above, Collins)
  - Part of the Seventh Epistle of the First Book of Horace Imitated
- John Toland – Reasons for Naturalizing the Jews in Great Britain and Ireland
- Ned Ward – The History of the Grand Rebellion

=== Drama ===
- Anonymous – The Apparition
- Joseph Addison – Cato, a Tragedy
- José de Cañizares – Don Juan de Espina en Milán
- John Gay – The Wife of Bath
- Charles Shadwell – The Merry Wives of Broad Street
- William Taverner – The Female Advocates

=== Poetry ===
- Henry Carey – Poems on Several Occasions (includes "Sally in Our Alley" and "Namby Pamby")
- Anne Finch – Miscellany Poems on Several Occasions
- Alexander Pope
  - Windsor Forest
  - Ode for Musick
- Edward Young
  - An Epistle to Lord Lansdowne
  - A Poem on the Last Day

See also 1713 in poetry

== Births ==
- January 13 – Charlotte Charke (Charlotte Cibber), English novelist, dramatist and actress (died 1760)
- February 20 – Anna Maria Elvia, Swedish poet (died 1784)
- April 12 – Guillaume Thomas François Raynal, French writer (died 1796)
- June 11 – Edward Capell, English Shakespeare scholar (died 1781)
- July 9 – John Newbery, English publisher and writer for children (died 1767)
- October 5 – Denis Diderot, French encyclopedist (died 1784)
- October 25 – Marie Jeanne Riccoboni (née de Mézières), French novelist and actress (died 1792)
- November 24 – Laurence Sterne, Irish-born novelist and cleric (died 1768)
- December 19 – Jonathan Toup, English classicist and critic (died 1785)

== Deaths ==
- January 5 – Jean Chardin, French travel writer (born 1643)
- January 11 – Pierre Jurieu, French Protestant leader and religious writer (born 1637)
- May 20 – Thomas Sprat, English writer, poet and bishop (born 1635)
- September 11 – Johannes Voet, Dutch jurist and legal writer (born 1647)
- September 18 – Samuel Cobb, English poet and critic (born 1675)
- October 20 – Archibald Pitcairne, Scottish physician and writer (born 1652)
- October 30 – John Barret, English religious writer and Presbyterian minister (born 1631)
- December 14 – Thomas Rymer, English Historiographer Royal (born 1641)
