= 1709 in literature =

List of years in literature	(table)
- … 1699; 1700; 1701; 1702; 1703; 1704; 1705; 1706; 1707; 1708; 1709; 1710; 1711; 1712; 1713; 1714; 1715; 1716; 1717; 1718; 1719 …
- In poetry 1706 1707 1708 1709 1710 1711 1712
- Art; Archaeology; Architecture; Literature; Music; Philosophy; Science; +...

This article contains information about the literary events and publications of 1709.

== Events ==
- February 1 or 2 – Alexander Selkirk, the inspiration for Robinson Crusoe, is rescued from the Juan Fernández Islands, where he was marooned, and begins his return to civilization.
- April 12 – The magazine The Tatler is founded in London by Richard Steele, writing as Isaac Bickerstaff. On July 8 "Mrs. (Phoebe) Crackenthorpe" (perhaps Delarivier Manley) begins publication of The Female Tatler.
- April 26 – An act of the General Assembly of the Church of Scotland provides for public libraries in presbyteries.
- May–October 20 – Delarivier Manley's roman à clef The New Atalantis (Secret Memoirs and Manners of Several Persons of Quality, of both Sexes, From The New Atalantis, an Island in the Mediterranean) is published in London (in two volumes, anonymously), purporting to be translated from Italian. Its satire of the Whigs is so scurrilous that the author is detained for questioning from October 29 to November 5. It goes through seven editions.
- May 2 – Alexander Pope's career as a poet is launched with the publication of the anthology Poetical Miscellanies, The Sixth Part, edited by John Dryden and published by Jacob Tonson in London.
- June 28 – Historian Gustaf Adlerfelt is killed at the Battle of Poltava; his eyewitness account is continued by his son.
- unknown dates
  - The Works of Mr William Shakespear edited by dramatist Nicholas Rowe appears. It is the first modern edition of Shakespeare's plays, including scene divisions, dramatis personæ and a prefatory account of Shakespeare's life, the first substantial biography of him. An unauthorised seventh volume, including Shakespeare's poems, is perhaps edited by Charles Gildon.
  - Ælfric of Eynsham's An English-Saxon Homily on the Birth-day of St. Gregory is translated from Old English by Elizabeth Elstob.

Two lines from Mihai Iștvanovici's Romanian poem in his version of the Georgian script

  - Anthim the Iberian, Metropolitan of Ungro-Wallachia, sends his pupil Mihai Iștvanovici to establish the first printing press in the Kingdom of Kartli and in Georgia at large. Operating out of Tbilisi Iștvanovici produces the Gospel (Sahareba), designing his own fonts for Georgian scripts (the first ones, done by Miklós Tótfalusi Kis, had never reached Tbilisi); his letters are also used for his Romanian-language poem, written as a postface to the Gospel.

== New books ==
=== Prose ===
- Abbé Olivier – Memoirs of the Life and Adventures of Signor Rozelli
- Mary Astell – Bart'lemy Fair
- Thomas Baker – Reflections on Learning, showing the Insufficiency thereof in its several particulars, in order to evince the usefulness and necessity of Revelation, vol. 1
- George Berkeley – An Essay Towards a New Theory of Vision
- Richard Blackmore – Instructions to Vander Beck
- Samuel Cobb – The Female Reign
- Anthony Ashley Cooper, 3rd Earl of Shaftesbury – Sensus Communis (philosophy)
- Daniel Defoe – The History of the Union of Great Britain
- Charles Gildon – The Golden Spy (satire)
- White Kennett – A Vindication of the Church and Clergy of England
- William King – Miscellanies in Prose and Verse
- John Lawson – A New Voyage to Carolina
- Delarivier Manley – The New Atalantis
- John Strype – Annals of the Reformation and Establishment of Religion
- Jonathan Swift
  - A Famous Prediction of Merlin
  - A Project for the Advancement of Religion and the Reformation of Manners ("By a Person of Quality")
  - A Vindication of Isaac Bickerstaff
- William Temple – Memoirs: Part III (ed. Jonathan Swift)
- John Trenchard – The Natural History of Superstition
- Giambattista Vico – De Nostri Temporis Studiorum Rationae (On the Study Methods of Our Times)

=== Drama ===
- Anthony Aston – Love in a Hurry
- Susanna Centlivre
  - The Busie Body
  - The Man's Bewitched
- Colley Cibber – The Rival Fools
- Prosper Jolyot de Crébillon – Electre
- John Dennis – Appius and Virginia
- Thomas d'Urfey – The Modern Prophets
- Juan Claudio de la Hoz y Mota – José, salvador de Egipto
- Charles Johnson – Love and Liberty (not performed)
- Alain-René Lesage – Turcaret
- Mary Pix – The Adventures in Madrid

=== Poetry ===
- John Reynolds – Death's Vision Represented in a Philosophical Sacred Poem
- Poetical Miscellanies: The Sixth Part (also called Tonson's Miscellanies)

== Births ==
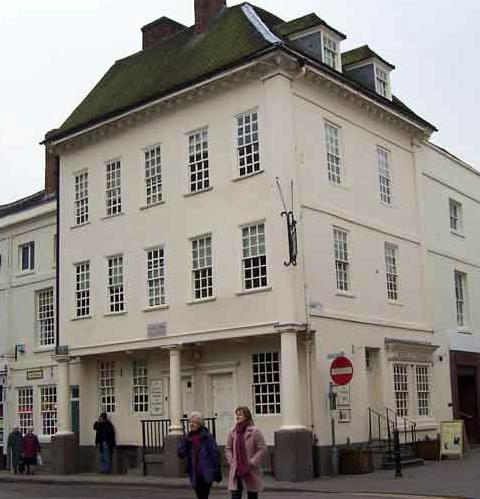
Samuel Johnson's birthplace in Market Square, Lichfield

- April 14 – Charles Collé, French dramatist (died 1783)
- July 24 – James Harris, English grammarian (died 1780)
- August 7 – Jean-Jacques Lefranc, Marquis de Pompignan, French polymath, author and poet (died 1784)
- August 29 – Jean-Baptiste-Louis Gresset, French poet and dramatist (died 1777)
- September 3 – Joan Claudi Peiròt, French writer in Occitan (died 1795)
- September 18 – Samuel Johnson, English author, critic, lexicographer and poet (died 1784)
- November 1 – Ignatius von Weitenauer, German Jesuit writer, exegete and Orientalist (died 1783)
- November 23 – Julien Offray de La Mettrie, French philosopher and physician (died 1751)
- December 14 – Caspar Friedrich Hachenberg, German grammarian (died 1793)
- unknown dates
  - Richard Burn, English legal writer (died 1785)
  - John Bancks, English poet, bookseller and biographer (died 1751)
- probable
  - James Adair, Irish historian (died 1783)
  - John Armstrong, Scottish poet, satirist and physician (died 1779)
  - John Cleland, controversial English novelist (died 1789)

== Deaths ==
- January – Robert Gould, English poet (born c. 1660)
- February 15 – John Philips, English poet (born 1676)
- May 17 – Mary Pix, English novelist and dramatist (born 1666)
- June 28 – Gustaf Adlerfelt, Swedish military diarist (died in action, born 1671)
- June 30 – Edward Lhuyd, Welsh naturalist and antiquary (born 1660)
- September 4 – Jean-François Regnard, French poet and dramatist (born 1655)
- December 1 – Abraham a Sancta Clara, Austrian theologian (born 1644)
- December 3 – Elizabeth Burnet, English religious writer and philanthropist (born 1661)
- December 8
  - Thomas Corneille, French dramatist (born 1625)
  - Bernadine a Piconio, French theologian and exegete (born 1633)
