= 1715 in literature =

List of years in literature	(table)
- … 1705; 1706; 1707; 1708; 1709; 1710; 1711; 1712; 1713; 1714; 1715; 1716; 1717; 1718; 1719; 1720; 1721; 1722; 1723; 1724; 1725 …
- In poetry 1712 1713 1714 1715 1716 1717 1718
- Art; Archaeology; Architecture; Literature; Music; Philosophy; Science; +...

This article contains information about the literary events and publications of 1715.

== Events ==
- c. August – Nicholas Rowe becomes the Poet Laureate of Great Britain.
- The first record of the actress and writer Eliza Haywood tells of her performing in Thomas Shadwell's Shakespeare adaptation, Timon of Athens; or, The Man-Hater at the Smock Alley Theatre, Dublin.

== New books ==
=== Prose ===
- Joseph Addison – The Free-Holder (periodical)
- Jane Barker – Exilius; or, The Banished Roman
- Richard Bentley – A Sermon upon Popery
- Samuel Croxall – The Vision
- Daniel Defoe
  - An Appeal to Honour and Justice
  - The Family Instructor
  - A Hymn to the Mob
- Elizabeth Elstob – The Rudiments of Grammar for the English-Saxon Tongue, first given in English; with an apology for the study of northern antiquities, the first grammar of Old English
- Thomas-Simon Gueullette – Les Mille et un quarts-d’heure, contes tartares (The Thousand and One Quarters of an Hour, Tartarian Tales)
- Alain-René Lesage (anonymous) – L'Histoire de Gil Blas de Santillane (Books 1–6)
- Charles Montagu – The Works and Life of the Late Earl of Halifax
- Jonathan Richardson – An Essay on the Theory of Painting
- "Captain" Alexander Smith – The Secret History of the Lives of the Most Celebrated Beauties, Ladies of Quality, and Jilts
- Richard Steele
  - The Englishman: Second Series (periodical)
  - Town-Talk (periodical)

=== Children ===
- Isaac Watts – Divine Songs Attempted in Easy Language for the Use of Children

=== Drama ===
- Christopher Bullock – A Woman's Revenge
- Henry Carey – The Contrivances
- Susanna Centlivre – The Gotham Election (not performed because of political content)
- Chikamatsu Monzaemon – The Battles of Coxinga (国姓爺合戦, Kokusen'ya Kassen)
- Charles Rivière Dufresny – La Coquette de village
- John Gay – The What D'Ye Call It
- Benjamin Griffin
  - Injured Virtue; or, The Virgin Martyr
  - Love in a Sack
- Newburgh Hamilton – The Doating Lovers
- Charles Johnson – The Country Lasses
- Charles Knipe – A City Ramble
- Charles Molloy – The Perplexed Couple
- Nicholas Rowe -The Tragedy of Lady Jane Grey
- Lewis Theobald – The Perfidious Brother (allegedly plagiarized, staged the following year)
- John Vanbrugh – The Country House

=== Poetry ===
- Charles Cotton – The Genuine Works of Charles Cotton
- Alexander Pope
  - The Temple of Fame (based on Chaucer)
  - The Iliad of Homer vol. i.
- Thomas Tickell – The First Book of Homer's Iliad
- Isaac Watts
  - Divine Songs
  - A Guide to Prayer

== Births ==
- January 14 (baptised) – Frances Vane, Viscountess Vane (Lady Fanny), English memoirist (died 1788)
- January 26 or February 26 – Claude Adrien Helvétius, French philosophical writer (died 1771)
- June 4 (c. 1715–1724) – Cao Xueqin, Chinese writer (died 1763)
- September 30 – Étienne Bonnot de Condillac, French philosophical writer (died 1780)
- October 1 – Richard Jago, English poet (died 1781)
- Probable year of birth
  - John Hawkesworth, English writer and editor (died 1773)
  - Alexander Russell, Scottish physician and naturalist (died 1768)

== Deaths ==
- January 7 – François Fénelon, French archbishop, theologian, poet and writer (born 1651)
- February 25 – Pu Songling (蒲松齡), Qing Dynasty Chinese writer (born 1640)
- March 8 – William Dampier, English explorer and writer (born 1651)
- March 17 – Gilbert Burnet, Scottish theologian and historian (born 1643)
- July 30 – Nahum Tate, Irish poet and hymnist (born 1652)
- October 13 – Nicolas Malebranche, French priest and rationalist philosopher (born 1638)
- Unknown date – Mary Monck, Irish poet (date of birth unknown)
