= 1723 in literature =

List of years in literature	(table)
- … 1713; 1714; 1715; 1716; 1717; 1718; 1719; 1720; 1721; 1722; 1723; 1724; 1725; 1726; 1727; 1728; 1729; 1730; 1731; 1732; 1733 …
- In poetry 1720 1721 1722 1723 1724 1725 1726
- Art; Archaeology; Architecture; Literature; Music; Philosophy; Science; +...

This article contains information about the literary events and publications of 1723.

== Events ==
- March – Voltaire makes an agreement with Abraham Viret to allow his work to be printed in Rouen.
- July – A new edition of Bernard Mandeville's The Fable of the Bees is presented as a public nuisance by the Grand Jury of Middlesex, England, to the Court of King's Bench. Mandeville escapes prosecution.
- November – After attending a party at the home of the marquis des Maisons, Voltaire contracts smallpox.
- unknown date – The book collection of Samuel Pepys (died 1703), including his Diary, is transferred to the Pepys Library at his alma mater, Magdalene College, Cambridge, in accordance with his will.

== New books ==
=== Fiction ===
- Penelope Aubin – The Life of Charlotta Du Pont, an English lady; taken from her own memoirs
- Jane Barker – A Patch-Work Screen for the Ladies
- Thomas-Simon Gueullette – Les Aventures merveilleuses du mandarin Fum-Hoam, contes chinois (The Transmigrations of the Mandarin Fum-Hoam (Chinese Tales))
- Eliza Haywood – Idalia: Or, the Unfortunate Mistress. A Novel. Written by Mrs. Eliza Haywood
- Anton Josef Kirchweger – Aurea Catena Homeri
- Margrethe Lasson – Den beklædte Sandhed (first novel in Danish)

=== Drama ===
- Elijah Fenton – Mariamne
- Francis Hawling – The Impertinent Lovers
- Eliza Haywood – A Wife to be Lett
- Ludvig Holberg – Erasmus Montanus
- Hildebrand Jacob – The Fatal Constancy
- Charles Johnson – Love in a Forest (adapted from As You Like It)
- Pierre de Marivaux – La Double Inconstance
- Ambrose Philips – Humphrey, Duke of Gloucester
- Jane Robe – The Fatal Legacy
- Richard Savage – Sir Thomas Overbury

=== Poetry ===
- Sir Richard Blackmore – Alfred: an epick poem
- Heyat Mahmud – Jangnama; Bengali
- David Mallet – William and Margaret
- William Meston – Knight of the Kirk
- Ambrose Philips – Ode on the Death of William, Earl of Cowper
- Matthew Prior
  - Down-Hall
  - The Turtle and the Sparrow
- Allan Ramsay – The Tea-Table Miscellany, Vol. 1
- Voltaire – La Henriade
- Ned Ward – Nuptial Dialogues and Debates, 3rd ed.

=== Non-fiction ===
- James Anderson – The Constitutions of the Free-Masons
- Henry Baker – An Invocation of Health: a poem
- Offspring Blackall, Bishop of Exeter (died 1716) – Collected Works
- Pietro Giannone – Storia civile del regno di Napoli (History of the Kingdom of Naples)
- Bernard de Mandeville – A Search into the Nature of Society
- Thomas Dempster (died 1625) – De Etruria regali libri VII (printed in sans-serif)
- Thomas Gordon and John Trenchard – Cato's Letters (essays)
- John Nott – The Cooks and Confectioners Dictionary or, the Accomplish'd Housewives Companion
- John Sheffield, Duke of Buckingham (died 1721) – The Works of John Sheffield, Earl of Mulgrave, Marquis of Normanby, and Duke of Buckingham

== Births ==
- January 21 (or June 21) – Baron d'Holbach, German-born French philosopher and encyclopedist (died 1789)
- February 23 – Richard Price, Welsh-born philosopher (died 1791)
- February 24 – John Burgoyne, English soldier and dramatist (died 1792)
- June 5 (baptized) – Adam Smith, Scottish economist (died 1790)
- June 20 – Adam Ferguson, Scottish philosopher and historian (died 1816)
- July 11 – Jean-François Marmontel, French novelist and dramatist (died 1799)
- September 30 – William Hutton, English local historian and poet (died 1815)
- November 8 – John Byron, English vice-admiral and memoirist (died 1786)
- November 30 – William Livingston, American political writer and politician (died 1790)
- December 26 – Friedrich Melchior, Baron von Grimm, German-born French philosopher and encyclopedist (died 1807)

== Deaths ==
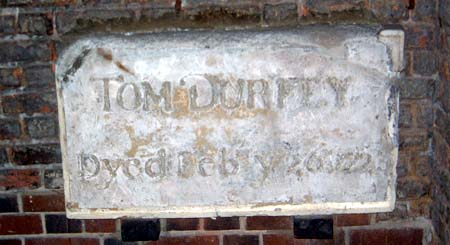
Memorial to Thomas d'Urfey at St James's Church, Piccadilly

- February 26 – Thomas d'Urfey, English dramatist (born 1653)
- March 13 – René Auguste Constantin de Renneville, French Protestant poet and historian (born 1650)
- March 15 – Johann Christian Günther, German poet (born 1695)
- May 11 – Jean Galbert de Campistron, French dramatist (born 1656)
- June 8 – Isaac Chayyim Cantarini, Italian poet, physician and preacher (born 1644)
- July 28 – Mariana Alcoforado, Portuguese nun (born 1640)
- August 21 – Dimitrie Cantemir, Romanian author (born 1673)
- September 23 – Jacques Basnage, French Protestant poet, linguist and preacher (born 1653)
- December 1 – Susanna Centlivre (Susanna Carroll), English dramatist (born c. 1667–70)
- December 17 – John Trenchard, English politician and writer (born 1662)
