= 1724 in literature =

List of years in literature	(table)
- … 1714; 1715; 1716; 1717; 1718; 1719; 1720; 1721; 1722; 1723; 1724; 1725; 1726; 1727; 1728; 1729; 1730; 1731; 1732; 1733; 1734 …
- In poetry 1721 1722 1723 1724 1725 1726 1727
- Art; Archaeology; Architecture; Literature; Music; Philosophy; Science; +...

This article contains information about the literary events and publications of 1724.

== Events ==
- January – Andrew Michael Ramsay goes to Rome to tutor the two sons of James Francis Edward Stuart, Jacobite pretender to the British throne.
- August – Thomas Longman establishes the Longman publishing house in London.
- November 16 – An "autobiographical" Narrative of the life of notorious criminal Jack Sheppard, said to be by Daniel Defoe, goes on sale at Sheppard's execution at Tyburn.

== New books ==
=== Prose ===
- Anonymous (attributed to Daniel Defoe) – A Narrative of All the Robberies, Escapes, &c. of John Sheppard
- Gilbert Burnet (died 1715) – Bishop Burnet's History of His Own Time, Vol. I
- Samuel Clarke – Sermons of Samuel Clarke
- Anthony Collins – Discourse of the Grounds and Reasons of the Christian Religion with An Apology for Free Debate and Liberty of Writing
- Mary Davys – The Reform'd Coquet (novella)
- Daniel Defoe
  - Roxana: The Fortunate Mistress
  - A New Voyage Round the World
  - A Tour thro' the Whole Island of Great Britain
- John Dennis – Vice and Luxury Publick Mischiefs (on Mandeville)
- Richard Fiddes
  - A General Treatise of Morality (on Mandeville)
  - The Life of Cardinal Wolsey
- Eliza Haywood
  - La Belle Assemblé
  - The Fatal Secret (fiction)
  - Lasselia
  - The Masqueraders
- Thomas Hearne, ed. – Robert of Gloucester's Chronicle
- Edward Hyde, 1st Earl of Clarendon (died 1674) – An Appendix to the History of the Grand Rebellion
- Captain Charles Johnson (attributed to Daniel Defoe or Nathaniel Mist) – A General History of the Pyrates
- William Law – Remarks Upon a Late Book (against Mandeville)
- John Oldmixon – The Critical History of England, Ecclesiastical and Civil
- Paul de Rapin – L'Histoire d'Angleterre
- Jonathan Swift
  - A Letter to the Shop-keepers... of Ireland (as M. B. Drapier)
  - A Letter to Mr. Harding the Printer (as Drapier)
  - Some Observations Upon a Paper Relating to Wood's Half-pence (as Drapier)
  - A Letter to the Whole People of Ireland (Drapier)
  - A Letter to the Right Honourable the Lord Viscount Molesworth (last of the Drapier letters)
  - Seasonable Advice
- Isaac Watts – Logic, or The Right Use of Reason in the Enquiry After Truth With a Variety of Rules to Guard Against Error in the Affairs of Religion and Human Life, as well as in the Sciences

=== Drama ===
- Colley Cibber – Caesar in Egypt
- John Gay – The Captives
- Ludvig Holberg – Henrich og Pernille (Henrik and Pernille)
- Robert Hurst – The Roman Maid
- George Jeffreys – Edwin
- Pierre de Marivaux – La Fausse Suivante
- William Phillips – Belisarius
- John Rich – The Necromancer; or, History of Dr. Faustus

=== Poetry ===
- Matthew Concanen – Miscellaneous Poems
- Eliza Haywood – Poems on Several Occasions
- Allan Ramsay
  - The Ever Green: Being a collection of Scots Poems
  - Health
- Elizabeth Tollet – Poems on Several Occasions
- Voltaire – La Henriade
- Leonard Welsted – Epistles, Odes, &c.
- See also 1724 in poetry

== Births ==
- January 12 – Frances Brooke, English novelist and dramatist (died 1789)
- March 20 – Duncan Ban MacIntyre, Scottish Gaelic poet (died 1812)
- April 22 – Immanuel Kant German philosopher (died 1804)
- June 4 – William Gilpin, English writer, painter and originator of "picturesque" (died 1804)
- July 2 – Friedrich Gottlieb Klopstock, German poet (died 1803)
- July 26 – Ji Yun (纪昀), Chinese poet and scholar (died 1805)
- July 31 – Noël François de Wailly, French grammarian and lexicographer (died 1801)
- October 31 – Christopher Anstey, English writer and poet (died 1805)
- December 13 – Franz Aepinus, German natural philosopher (died 1802)
- Unknown dates
  - Samuel Derrick, Irish writer (died 1769)
  - Frances Sheridan (Frances Chamberlaine), Irish novelist and dramatist (died 1766)

== Deaths ==
- January 1 – Charles Gildon, English critic and dramatist (born c. 1665)
- January 15 – George Wheler, English travel writer (born 1651)
- February 5 – Mary Cowper, English diarist (born 1685)
- February 12 – Elkanah Settle, English poet and dramatist (born 1648)
- March 19 – Johann Christian Thomae, German historian and biographer (born 1668)
- July 11 – Delarivier Manley, writer, playwright and pamphleteer (born c. 1663)
- August 15 – Manko, Japanese poet (year of birth not known)
- October 6 – Charles Rivière Dufresny, French dramatist (born 1648)
- October 29 – William Wollaston, English philosophical writer (born 1659)
- November 29 – Laurence Braddon, English writer and politician (year of birth not known)
- November – Liam an Dúna Mac Cairteáin, Irish poet and soldier (b. 1668)
- probable – Proinsias Ó Doibhlin, Irish poet and priest (year of birth not known)
