= 1716 in poetry =

List of years in poetry	(table)
- … 1706; 1707; 1708; 1709; 1710; 1711; 1712; 1713; 1714; 1715; 1716; 1717; 1718; 1719; 1720; 1721; 1722; 1723; 1724; 1725; 1726 …
- In literature 1713 1714 1715 1716 1717 1718 1719
- Art; Archaeology; Architecture; Literature; Music; Philosophy; Science; +...

Nationality words link to articles with information on the nation's poetry or literature (for instance, Irish or France).

== Events ==
- Voltaire is exiled to Tulle.
- Poet John Byrom returns to England to teach his own system of shorthand.
- Edmund Curll renews his controversy with Matthew Prior, by threatening to publish the poet's works without permission.

== Works published ==
- Jane Brereton, The Fifth Ode of the Fourth Book of Horace Imitated
- Francis Chute, writing under the pen name "Mr. [Joseph] Gay", The Petticoat: An heroi-comical poem, often wrongly attributed to John Durant Breval
- John Gay, Trivia or the Art of Walking the Streets of London and Court Poems
- Lady Mary Wortley Montagu, Court Eclogues
- Poems on Affairs of State, from the time of Oliver Cromwell to the abdication of K. James Second, written by the Greatest Wits of the Age, 6th edn, including first publication of "The Duel of the Crabs" by Charles Sackville, 6th Earl of Dorset (died 1706)
- Alexander Pope, translator, Homer's Iliad, Volume II this year (containing Books 5–8), preceded by Book I in 1715, and to be followed by Volume III (Books 9–12) in 1717, IV (Books 13–16) in 1718, and V (Books 17–21) VI (Books 22–24) in 1720
- da Silva, editor, Fénix Renascida, anthology of Portuguese poetry
- Nicholas Rowe and others, Verses upon the Sickness and Recovery of the Right Honourable Robert Walpole, Esq., in State Poems, by the most Eminent Hands, including Susanna Centlivre's, "Ode to Hygeia"
- Isaac Watts, Divine Songs

== Births ==
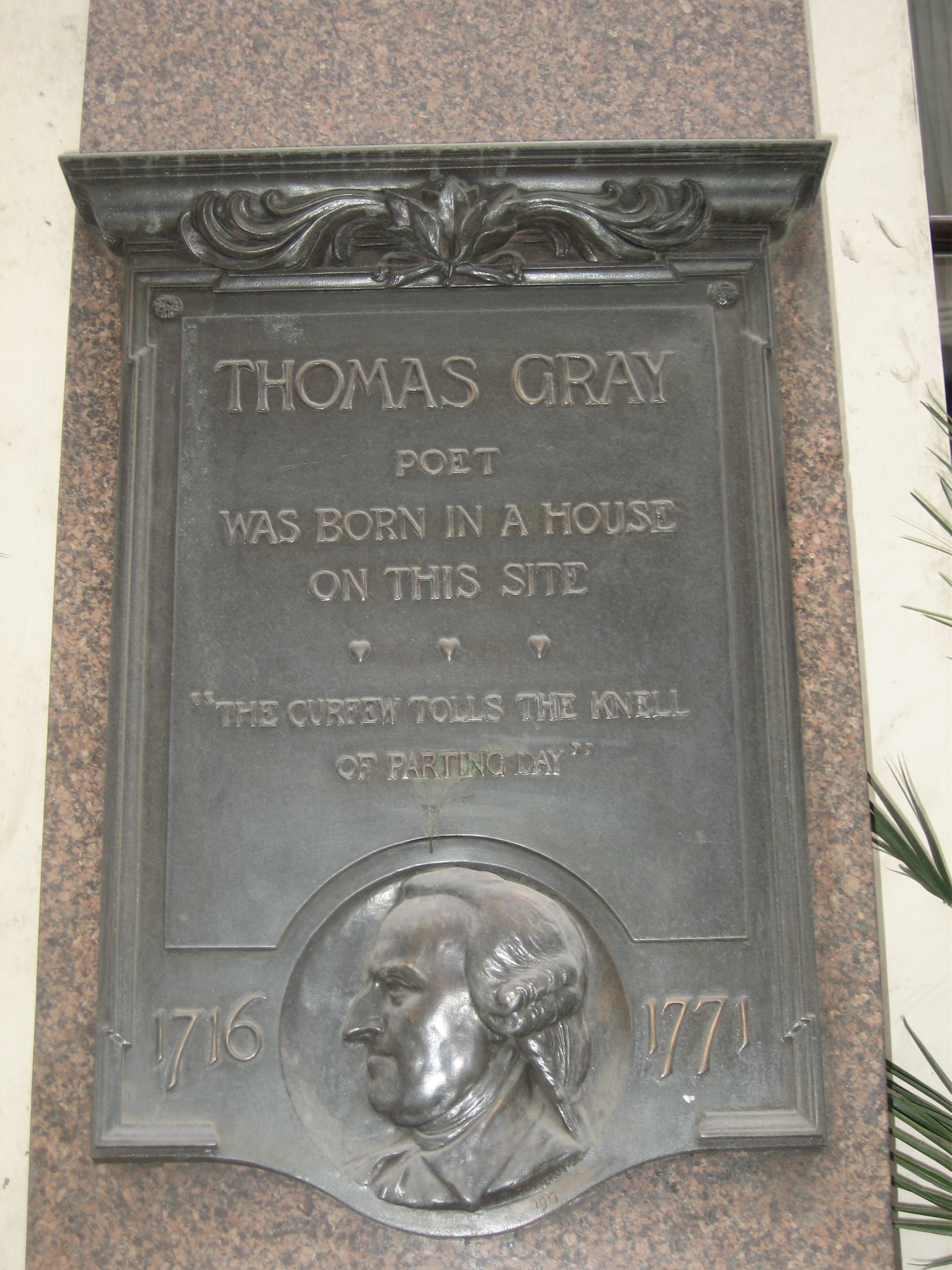
Monument marking birthplace of Thomas Gray

Death years link to the corresponding "[year] in poetry" article:

- February 23 – Konrad Arnold Schmid (died 1789), German poet
- December 25 – Johann Jakob Reiske (died 1774), German scholar and physician
- December 26
  - Thomas Gray (died 1771), English poet
  - Jean François de Saint-Lambert (died 1803), French poet, philosopher and military officer
- Also:
  - year uncertain – Elizabeth Amherst (died 1779), English poet and amateur naturalist
  - Yosa Buson 与謝蕪村 (died 1784), Japanese Edo period poet and painter; along with Matsuo Bashō and Kobayashi Issa considered among the greatest poets of the period and one of the greatest haiku poets of all time
  - Yuan Mei (died 1797), Chinese Qing dynasty poet, scholar, artist and gastronome

== Deaths ==
Death years link to the corresponding "[year] in poetry" article:

- January 1 – William Wycherley (born c.1641), English playwright and poet
- February 19 – Dorothe Engelbretsdotter (born 1634), Norwegian poet
- Also:
  - Samuel Cobb, death year uncertain, one source states 1713 (born 1675), English poet

== See also ==
- Poetry
- List of years in poetry
- List of years in literature
- 18th century in poetry
- 18th century in literature
- Augustan poetry
- Scriblerus Club

== Notes ==
- "A Timeline of English Poetry" Web page of the Representative Poetry Online Web site, University of Toronto
