= 1723 in poetry =

List of years in poetry	(table)
- … 1713; 1714; 1715; 1716; 1717; 1718; 1719; 1720; 1721; 1722; 1723; 1724; 1725; 1726; 1727; 1728; 1729; 1730; 1731; 1732; 1733 …
- In literature 1720 1721 1722 1723 1724 1725 1726
- Art; Archaeology; Architecture; Literature; Music; Philosophy; Science; +...

Nationality words link to articles with information on the nation's poetry or literature (for instance, Irish or France).

== Events ==
- July – A new edition of Bernard Mandeville's The Fable of the Bees is presented as a public nuisance by the Grand Jury of Middlesex, England, to the Court of King's Bench. Mandeville escapes prosecution.

== Works published in English ==
=== English colonies in America ===
- Samuel Keimer, Elegy on the Much Lamented Death of [. . .] Aquila Rose, a verse memorial memorable for having been set in type by Benjamin Franklin, then an employee of Keimer, a printer in Philadelphia
- Francis Knapp, attributed, Gloria Britannorum; or, The British Worthies
- Edward Taylor, A Funerall Teare [. . .] an elegy on Increase Mather

=== Great Britain ===
- Henry Baker, An Invocation of Health: a poem
- Sir Richard Blackmore, Alfred: An epick poem
- Ambrose Philips, Ode on the Death of William, Earl Cowper
- Matthew Prior:
  - Down-Hall
  - The Turtle and the Sparrow
- Allan Ramsay, The Fair Assembly
- Ned Ward, Nuptial Dialogues and Debates, 3rd ed.

== Works published in other languages ==
- Heyat Mahmud, Jangnama; Bengali
- Jean-Baptiste Rousseau, Ode et Cantates, first published in London; French

== Births ==
Death years link to the corresponding "[year] in poetry" article:

- January 27 – Johann Andreas Cramer (died 1788), German poet, writer and theologian
- September 30 – William Hutton (died 1815), English local historian and poet
- November 3 – Samuel Davies (died 1761), English Colonial American Presbyterian clergyman, president of Princeton College, author and poet
- November 30 – William Livingston (died 1790), English Colonial American public official, poet and writer

== Deaths ==
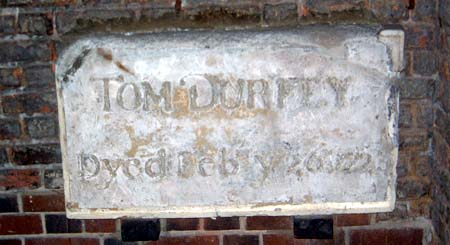
Memorial to Thomas d'Urfey at St James's Church, Piccadilly

Death years link to the corresponding "[year] in poetry" article:

- February 13 – Sarah Fyge Egerton (born 1668), English poet
- February 26 – Thomas d'Urfey (born 1653), English writer of plays, songs, poetry and jokes
- March 13 – René Auguste Constantin de Renneville (born 1650), French Protestant poet and historian
- March 15 – Johann Christian Günther, German poet (born 1695)
- June 8 – Isaac Chayyim Cantarini (born 1644), Italian poet, writer, physician, rabbi and preacher
- September 23 – Jacques Basnage (born 1653), French Protestant poet, linguist and preacher

== See also ==
- Poetry
- List of years in poetry
- List of years in literature
- 18th century in poetry
- 18th century in literature
- Augustan poetry
- Scriblerus Club

== Notes ==
- "A Timeline of English Poetry" Web page of the Representative Poetry Online Web site, University of Toronto
