= 1708 in literature =

List of years in literature	(table)
- … 1698; 1699; 1700; 1701; 1702; 1703; 1704; 1705; 1706; 1707; 1708; 1709; 1710; 1711; 1712; 1713; 1714; 1715; 1716; 1717; 1718 …
- In poetry 1705 1706 1707 1708 1709 1710 1711
- Art; Archaeology; Architecture; Literature; Music; Philosophy; Science; +...

This article contains information about the literary events and publications of 1708.

== Events ==
- July 14 – Joseph Trapp becomes the first Oxford Professor of Poetry.
- unknown date – Edward Lhuyd becomes a Fellow of the Royal Society.

== New books ==
=== Prose ===
- Joseph Addison – The Present State of the War (pro-Marlborough tract)
- Francis Atterbury – Fourteen Sermons Preach'd on Several Occasions
- Joseph Bingham – Origines Ecclesiasticae, or Antiquities of the Christian Church, vol. 1
- Laurent Bordelon – Mital; ou Aventures incroyables
- Elizabeth Burnet – A Method of Devotion
- Jeremy Collier – An Ecclesiastical History of Great Britain, Chiefly of England, vol. 1
- Anthony Ashley Cooper, 3rd Earl of Shaftesbury – A Letter Concerning Enthusiasm (opposing radical Protestantism)
- Edmund Curll – The Charitable Surgeon
- Anne Dacier (Anne Lefèvre) – Homer's Odyssey (prose, first translation into French)
- John Downes – Roscius Anglicanus (historical review of the stage)
- John Fisher, Cardinal Bishop of Rochester (executed 1535) – Funeral Sermon for Margaret, Countess of Richmond and Derby (originally delivered 1509; published with an anonymous preface by Thomas Baker)
- John Gay – Wine
- Charles Gildon
  - Libertas Triumphans (re Battle of Oudenarde)
  - The New Metamorphosis (fiction)
- John Harris – Lexicon Technicum: Or, A Universal English Dictionary of Arts and Sciences, vol. 1 (2nd edition)
- Aaron Hill & Nahum Tate – The Celebrated Speeches of Ajax and Ulysses, for the Armour of Achilles (from Ovid)
- Benjamin Hoadly – The Unhappiness of the Present Establishment, and the Unhappiness of Absolute Monarchy
- Anne de La Roche-Guilhem – La Foire de Beaucaire
- François Leguat – Voyage et avantures de François Leguat et de ses compagnons, en deux isles désertes des Indes orientales (A new voyage to the East-Indies)
- John Locke (died 1704) – Some Familiar Letters
- Simon Ockley – The Conquest of Syria, Persia, and Aegypt by the Saracens (vol. 1 of History of the Saracens)
- John Oldmixon – The British Empire in America
- Jonathan Swift
  - Predictions for the Year 1708
  - The Accomplishment of the First of Mr. Bickerstaff's Predictions (together with part of the "Bickerstaff Papers")
  - An Argument against Abolishing Christianity

=== Drama ===
- Thomas Baker – The Fine Lady's Airs (first performed December 18)
- Charles Goring – Irene
- Peter Anthony Motteux – Love's Triumph (opera)
- Nicholas Rowe – The Royal Convert
- William Taverner – The Disappointment
- Lewis Theobald – The Persian Princess

=== Poetry ===
- Richard Blackmore – The Kit-Cats
- Ebenezer Cooke – The Sot-Weed Factor (poem)
- Elijah Fenton – Oxford and Cambridge Miscellany Poems
- William King – The Art of Cookery (poem)
- Matthew Prior – Poems on Several Occasions (see also 1707)

== Births ==
- April 23 – Friedrich von Hagedorn, German poet (died 1754)
- July 8 – Claude-Henri de Fusée de Voisenon, French dramatist (died 1775)
- August 29 – Olof von Dalin, Swedish poet (died 1763)
- September 2 – André le Breton, French publisher (died 1779)
- October 16 – Albrecht von Haller, Swiss biologist and poet (died 1777)
- unknown dates
  - Richard Dawes, English classical scholar (died 1766)
  - Thomas Seward, English poet (died 1790)

== Deaths ==
- January 1 – Johannes Kelpius, German polymath (born 1673)
- March 4 – Thomas Ward, English Catholic writer (born 1652)
- March 5 – Charles Le Gobien, French Jesuit writer (born 1653)
- March 15 – William Walsh, English poet and critic (born 1662)
- October 11 – Ehrenfried Walther von Tschirnhaus, German philosopher (born 1651)
- October 21
  - Kata Szidónia Petrőczy, Hungarian Baroque writer (born 1659)
  - Christian Weise, German dramatist and poet (born 1642)
- October 22 – Hermann Witsius, Dutch theologian (born 1636)
- November 15 – Gregory Hascard, English religious writer and cleric (year of birth unknown)
- unknown date – Nikolai Spathari (Nicolae Milescu), Moldavian travel writer and diplomat (born 1636)
