= 1717 in literature =

List of years in literature	(table)
- … 1707; 1708; 1709; 1710; 1711; 1712; 1713; 1714; 1715; 1716; 1717; 1718; 1719; 1720; 1721; 1722; 1723; 1724; 1725; 1726; 1727 …
- In poetry 1714 1715 1716 1717 1718 1719 1720
- Art; Archaeology; Architecture; Literature; Music; Philosophy; Science; +...

This article contains information about the literary events and publications of 1717.

== Events ==
- January – Three Hours After Marriage, a stage play by Alexander Pope, John Gay and John Arbuthnot, mocks the poet and critic John Dennis as "Sir Tremendous Longinus the Critic", Anne Finch, Countess of Winchilsea as "Clinkett the Poetess" and Colley Cibber as "Plotwell". The play encounters massive criticism and has a short run, which mortifies Pope. In February, Dennis publishes his critical Remarks upon Mr. Pope's Translation of Homer to which in May Thomas Parnell retorts with Homer's Battle of the Frogs and Mice. With the Remarks of Zolius. To which is prefixed, the Life of the said Zolius, after which Dennis and Pope are reconciled for a decade.
- March 2 – Ballet master John Weaver revives the pantomime genre at the Theatre Royal, Drury Lane, in London with The Loves of Mars and Venus – a new Entertainment in Dancing after the manner of the Antient Pantomimes and Perseus and Andromeda.
- March 27 – Actress Adrienne Lecouvreur is invited to join the Comédie-Française in Paris, performing first in the title rôle of Prosper Jolyot de Crébillon's Electre.
- April 22 – At Lincoln's Inn Fields Theatre in London, the actor-manager John Rich introduces the character of Harlequin into pantomimes.
- May 16 – Voltaire is sentenced to eleven months in the Bastille and banished from Paris for criticizing the Duc D'Orléans. While in prison he writes his first play, Oedipe ("Oedipus").
- unknown dates
  - The last two volumes of Antoine Galland's Les mille et une nuits are published posthumously in Lyon of the first translation of One Thousand and One Nights into a European language, including the first translation of the story of Ali Baba.
  - The Irish poet Hugh MacCurtin (Aodh Buidhe Mac Cuirtin)'s A brief discourse in vindication of the antiquity of Ireland, out of many authentick Irish histories and chronicles (based on Geoffrey Keating's History of Ireland) is published in Dublin. The author is imprisoned in the city about this time.

== New books ==
=== Prose ===
- Joseph Addison, John Dryden, Laurence Eusden, Sir Samuel Garth, John Gay, Alexander Pope, Nicholas Rowe and others – Ovid's Metamorphoses
- Laurent d'Arvieux – Voyage dans la Palestine
- Elias Ashmole – Memoirs
- John Durant Breval – The Art of Dress
- Susanna Centlivre – An Epistle to the King of Sweden
- Anthony Collins – A Philosophical Inquiry Concerning Human Liberty
- John Dennis – Remarks upon Mr. Pope's Translation of Homer
- Benjamin Hoadly – The Nature of the Kingdom, or Church of Christ (part of the Bangorian Controversy)
- Jane Holt – A Fairy Tale
- William Law – The Bishop Bangor's Late Sermon (answer to Hoadly)
- Matthew Prior – The Dove
- John Quincy – Lexicon Physico-medicum
- Richard Savage – The Convocation; or, A Battle of Pamphlets (satire on the Bangorian Controversy)
- Thomas Tickell – An Epistle from a Lady in England
- John Toland – The State-Anatomy of Great Britain
- Joseph Trapp – The Real Nature of the Church or Kingdom of Christ (part of the Bangorian Controversy)

=== Drama ===
- John Durant Breval (as Mr. Gay) – The Confederates (attack on John Gay, Alexander Pope, and the other members of the Scriblerus Club)
- Susanna Centlivre – The Cruel Gift
- Colley Cibber – The Non-Juror
- Charles Johnson – The Sultaness
- Delarivière Manley – Lucius, the First Christian King of Britain
- Alexander Pope, John Gay and John Arbuthnot – Three Hours After Marriage
- William Taverner
  - The Artful Husband
  - The Artful Wife
- Pedro Calderón de la Barca – Autos sacramentales, alegóricos e historiales del insigne poeta español

=== Poetry ===
- Wentworth Dillon, 4th Earl of Roscommon – Poems by the Earl of Roscomon [sic]
- Elijah Fenton – Poems on Several Occasions
- Thomas Parnell – Homer's Battle of the Frogs and Mice
- Alexander Pope
  - The Iliad of Homer vol. iii
  - The Works of Mr. Alexander Pope (with new material)
- Thomas Traherne – Hexameron (on creationism)
- Leonard Welsted – Palaemon to Caelia, at Bath
- Ned Ward
  - British Wonders
  - A Collection of Historical and State Poems
- Eugenio Gerardo Lobo – Selva de las musas

== Births ==
- c. February 11 – William Williams Pantycelyn, Welsh religious writer and hymnist (died 1791)
- February 14 – Richard Owen Cambridge, English poet (died 1802)
- February 19 – David Garrick, English actor and playwright (died 1779)
- September 24 – Horace Walpole, English man of letters (died 1797)
- November 16 – Jean le Rond d'Alembert, French mathematician and encyclopedist (died 1783)
- November 25 (November 14 OS) – Alexander Sumarokov, Russian dramatist (died 1777)
- December 9 – Johann Joachim Winckelmann, German art historian (died 1768)
- December 16 – Elizabeth Carter, English poet, writer and translator (died 1806)

== Deaths ==
- January 6 – Lambert Bos, Dutch scholar and critic (born 1670)
- March 3 – Pierre Allix, French religious writer (born 1641)
- June 9 – Jeanne Guyon, French writer and mystic (born 1648)
- September – Casimir Oudin, French monk and bibliographer (born 1638)
- Unknown dates
  - William Diaper, English poet (born 1685)
  - Ahmed ibn Nasir, Moroccan Sufi writer and teacher (born 1647)
