= 1711 in literature =

List of years in literature	(table)
- … 1701; 1702; 1703; 1704; 1705; 1706; 1707; 1708; 1709; 1710; 1711; 1712; 1713; 1714; 1715; 1716; 1717; 1718; 1719; 1720; 1721 …
- In poetry 1708 1709 1710 1711 1712 1713 1714
- Art; Archaeology; Architecture; Literature; Music; Philosophy; Science; +...

This article contains information about the literary events and publications of 1711.

== Events ==
- March 1 – The periodical The Spectator is founded by Joseph Addison and Richard Steele in London.
- May 23 – Robert Harley, author, statesman and friend to the "Tory wits," who has been involved in Anne, Queen of Great Britain's ministry for some time, is created Earl of Oxford.
- July – After defeat at the Battle of Stănileşti during the Pruth River Campaign, Dimitrie Cantemir flees to Russia and begins writing his most important works.
- December – Charles Gildon becomes editor of The British Mercury.
- unknown date – The English fairy tale Jack the Giant-Killer appears in print for the first time.

== New books ==
=== Prose ===
- Francis Atterbury – Representation of the State of Religion
- Richard Blackmore – The Nature of Man
- Pierre Boileau – The Works of Monsieur Boileau, vol. 1 (published by John Ozell)
- Laurent Bordelon – Gomgam, ou l'Homme prodigieux transporté dans l'air, sur la terre et sous les eaux (Gomgam, the remarkable man transported through the air, on the ground and under the water)
- Abel Boyer – The Political State of Great Britain
- Cornelis de Bruijn – Reizen over Moskovie, door Persie en Indie (Voyage to the Levant and Travels into Moscovy, Persia, and the East Indies)
- Jean Chardin – Voyages de monsieur le chevalier Chardin en Perse et autres lieux de l'orient (The Travels of Sir John Chardin in Persia and the Orient)
- Giuseppe Colombani – Unnamed treatise on the use of the spadone
- Anthony Ashley Cooper, 3rd Earl of Shaftesbury – Characteristicks of Men, Manners, Opinions, Times (also known as "Shaftesbury's Characteristics")
- Daniel Defoe
  - The British Visions
  - An Essay on the History of Parties
  - An Essay on the South-Sea Trade
  - The Present State of the Parties in Great Britain (attributed)
  - The Secret History of the October Club
- John Dennis – Reflections Critical and Satyrical, Upon a Late Rhapsody call'd, An Essay upon Criticism (Dennis's counterattack on Alexander Pope)
- John Gay – The Present State of Wit (satirical answer to Defoe)
- William King – The History of the Heathen Gods
- George Mackenzie – Several Proposals Conducing to a Further Union of Britain
- Samuel Richter (Sincerus Renatus) – Theo-Philosophica Theoretica et Practica
- Richard Steele, Joseph Addison, Eustace Budgell, et al. – The Spectator
- John Strype – The Life and Acts of Matthew Parker
- Jonathan Swift
  - Miscellanies in Prose and Verse
  - The Conduct of the Allies (contra Marlborough and the War of the Spanish Succession)
- Thormodus Torfæus – Historia Rerum Norvegicarum
- Ned Ward – The Life and Notable Adventures of that Renown'd Knight Don Quixote de la Mancha (in verse)
- William Whiston – Primitive Christianity Revived, vol. 1

=== Drama ===
- Chikamatsu Monzaemon (近松 門左衛門) – The Courier for Hell (冥途の飛脚, Meido no hikyaku)
- Prosper Jolyot de Crébillon – Rhadamiste et Zénobie
- Charles Johnson –
  - The Generous Husband
  - The Wife's Relief
- Elkanah Settle – The City Ramble
- Richard Steele – The Man of Mode

=== Poetry ===
- Alexander Pope – An Essay on Criticism

== Births ==
- April 26 – Jeanne-Marie Leprince de Beaumont, French novelist (died 1780)
- May 7 – David Hume, Scottish philosopher (died 1776)
- May 18 – Roger Joseph Boscovich, Ragusan (Croatian) poet and polymath (died 1787)
- May 31 – Johann Heinrich Samuel Formey, German philosopher writing in French (died 1797)
- October 12 – William Tytler, Scottish historian (died 1792)
- October 17 – Jupiter Hammon, American poet (died c. 1806)
- November 19 – Mikhail Lomonosov, Russian writer and polymath (died 1765)
- December 6 – Kitty Clive, English actress and writer of farce (died 1785)
- unknown date – William Smith, English classicist and Anglican dean (died 1787)

== Deaths ==
- January 5 – Mary Rowlandson, American autobiographer (born 1635)
- February 10 – Richard Duke, English poet and cleric (born 1658)
- March 13 – Nicolas Boileau-Despréaux, French poet and critic (born 1636)
- March 19 – Bishop Thomas Ken, English theologian and hymnist (born 1637)
- April 11 – François Lamy, French Benedictine apologist (born 1636)
- May 2 – Laurence Hyde, 1st Earl of Rochester, English writer and statesman (born 1641)
- June 7 – Henry Dodwell, Irish theologian (born 1641)
- June 10 – Johannes Munnicks, Dutch medical writer (born 1652)
- September 4 – John Caryll, English poet, dramatist and diplomat (born 1625)
- October 3 – Richard Bulstrode, English memoirist (born 1610)
- November 3 – John Ernest Grabe, German-born English theologian (born 1666)
