= 1718 in literature =

List of years in literature	(table)
- … 1708; 1709; 1710; 1711; 1712; 1713; 1714; 1715; 1716; 1717; 1718; 1719; 1720; 1721; 1722; 1723; 1724; 1725; 1726; 1727; 1728 …
- In poetry 1715 1716 1717 1718 1719 1720 1721
- Art; Archaeology; Architecture; Literature; Music; Philosophy; Science; +...

This article contains information about the literary events and publications of 1718.

== Events ==
- November 1 – Lady Mary Wortley Montagu writes the last of her Turkish Letters, addressed to Alexander Pope.
- November 18 – Voltaire's first play, Oedipus, premières at the Comédie-Française in Paris. This is his first use of the pseudonym. He has been released from the Bastille this year, while Marguerite De Launay, Baronne Staal, begins a two-year sentence.
- The Free-Thinker, a Whig newspaper, is founded by poet Ambrose Philips and Rev. Hugh Boulter in London.
- Laurence Eusden becomes Poet Laureate of England.
- Ludvig Holberg becomes a professor at the University of Copenhagen.

== New books ==
=== Prose ===
- Nicholas Amhurst – Protestant Popery; or, The Convocation (part of the Bangorian Controversy)
- Daniel Defoe (attr.) – A Vindication of the Press
- Charles Gildon – The Complete Art of Poetry
- Mary Hearne – The Lover's Week
- Simon Ockley – The History of the Saracens, volume 2
- Ambrose Philips – The Free-Thinker (periodical)
- Allan Ramsay -Christ's Kirk on the Green (revised version)
- John Ray – Philosophical Letters
- John Strype – The Life and Acts of John Witgift
- John Toland – Nazarenus, or Jewish, Gentile and Mahometan Christianity
- John Wilmot, 2nd Earl of Rochester – Remains of the Earl of Rochester

=== Drama ===
- Charles Beckingham – Scipio Africanus
- John Durant Breval – The Play is the Plot
- Christopher Bullock – The Traitor
- Susanna Centlivre – A Bold Stroke for a Wife
- Charles Molloy – The Coquet
- Richard Savage – Love in a Veil
- Elkanah Settle and Lewis Theobald – The Lady's Triumph
- Voltaire – Œdipe

=== Poetry ===
- Joseph Addison
  - Poems on Several Occasions
  - The Resurrection
- Richardson Pack – Miscellanies in Verse and Prose
- Alexander Pope – The Iliad of Homer iv

== Births ==
- February 18
  - Søren Abildgaard, Danish naturalist, author and artist (died 1791)
  - Robert Henry, Scottish historian (died 1790)
- April 7 – Hugh Blair, Scottish rhetorician (died 1800)
- May 16 – Maria Gaetana Agnesi, Italian philosopher (died 1799)
- July 18 – Saverio Bettinelli, Italian Jesuit writer (died 1808)

== Deaths ==
- April 27 – Jacques Bernard, French theologian (born 1658)
- May 16 – Jonas Danilssønn Ramus, Norwegian historian (born 1649)
- May 22 – Gaspard Abeille, French lyric and tragic poet (born 1648)
- July 28 – Étienne Baluze, French scholar (born 1630)
- October 9 – Richard Cumberland, English philosopher and bishop (born 1631)
- December 6 – Nicholas Rowe, English dramatist (born 1674)
- December 9 – Vincenzo Coronelli Italian encyclopedist (born 1674)

== See also ==
- Bangorian Controversy
- 1718 in poetry
