= 1721 in literature =

List of years in literature	(table)
- … 1711; 1712; 1713; 1714; 1715; 1716; 1717; 1718; 1719; 1720; 1721; 1722; 1723; 1724; 1725; 1726; 1727; 1728; 1729; 1730; 1731 …
- In poetry 1718 1719 1720 1721 1722 1723 1724
- Art; Archaeology; Architecture; Literature; Music; Philosophy; Science; +...

This article is a summary of the major literary events and publications of 1721.

== Events ==
- February – Joseph A. Hall's book, A Sober Reply to Mr. Higgs' Merry Arguments from the Light of Nature for the Tritheistic Doctrine of the Trinity..., published in the previous year, is burned by order of the British House of Lords for ridiculing Christian doctrine.
- unknown dates
  - John Cleland becomes a pupil at Westminster School; at first an exemplary student, he would eventually be expelled for an unknown offence.
  - Lady Mary Wortley Montagu introduces to London the Ottoman Turkish method of inoculation against smallpox – variolation. The Princess of Wales is persuaded to test the treatment and it becomes fashionable.
  - Thomas Parnell's A Night-Piece on Death is published, inaugurating the "Graveyard poets" movement.

== New books ==
=== Prose ===
- Joseph Addison – The Works of Joseph Addison
- Penelope Aubin
  - The Strange Adventures of the Count de Vinevil and His Family
  - The Life of Madam de Beaumont
- Nathan Bailey – An Universal Etymological English Dictionary
- George Berkeley – An Essay Towards Preventing the Ruine of Great Britain
- Richard Blackmore – A New Version of the Psalms of David
- Shaftesbury – Letters from the Late Earl of Shaftesbury, to Robert Molesworth
- Charles Gildon – The Laws of Poetry
- Eliza Haywood – Letters from a Lady of Quality to a Chevalier (translation)
- Montesquieu – Lettres persanes (Persian Letters)
- Alexander Pennecuik – An Ancient Prophecy Concerning Stock-Jobbing, and the Conduct of the Directors of the South-Sea-Company
- Matthew Prior – Colin's Mistakes
- John Sheffield, Duke of Buckingham (died 1721) – The Works of the most noble John Sheffield, late Duke of Buckingham, published by His Grace in his life time
- John Strype – Ecclesiastical Memorials
- Emanuel Swedenborg – Prodromus principiorum rerum naturalium
- Jonathan Swift
  - The Bubble
  - A Letter to a Young Gentleman, Lately Enter'd into Holy Orders
- Thomas Tickell – Kensington Garden
- Diego de Torres Villarroel – Pronósticos
- Robert Wodrow – The History of the Sufferings of the Church of Scotland

=== Drama ===
- Colley Cibber – The Refusal
- Eliza Haywood – The Fair Captive
- Aaron Hill – Fatal Extravagance
- John Mottley – Antiochus
- Thomas Odell – The Chimera
- Edward Young – The Revenge

== Births ==
- March 19 – Tobias Smollett, Scottish physician and novelist (died 1771)
- August 21 – Lucretia Wilhelmina van Merken, Dutch poet and playwright (died 1789)
- November 9 – Mark Akenside, English poet (died 1770)
- November 16 – Johann Silberschlag, German theologian (died 1791)
- December 25 – William Collins, English poet (died 1759)
- December 27 – François Hemsterhuis, Dutch moral philosopher (died 1790)
- unknown date – Robert Potter, English translator, poet and cleric (died 1804)

== Deaths ==
- January 3 – Juan Núñez de la Peña, Spanish historian (born 1641)
- January 26 – Pierre Daniel Huet, French scholar and bishop (born 1630)
- June 18 – Charlwood Lawton, English Jacobite author (born 1660)
- August 13 – Jacques Lelong, French bibliographer (born 1665)
- September 18 – Matthew Prior, English poet and diplomat (born 1664)
- October 14 – Jean Palaprat, French dramatist (born 1650)
