= 1712 in literature =

List of years in literature	(table)
- … 1702; 1703; 1704; 1705; 1706; 1707; 1708; 1709; 1710; 1711; 1712; 1713; 1714; 1715; 1716; 1717; 1718; 1719; 1720; 1721; 1722 …
- In poetry 1709 1710 1711 1712 1713 1714 1715
- Art; Archaeology; Architecture; Literature; Music; Philosophy; Science; +...

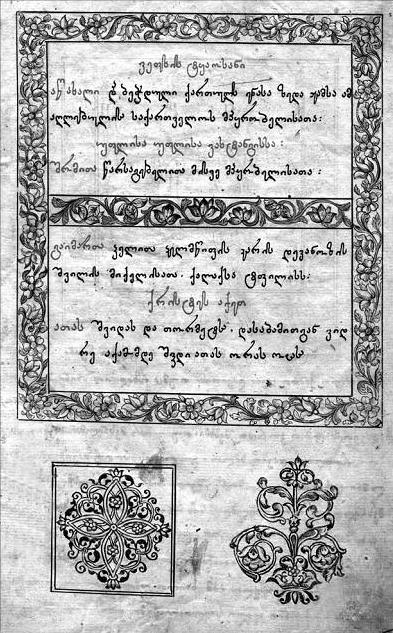
The title page of the 1712 printing of “Knight in the Panther's Skin” by Shota Rustaveli, composed ca. 1180–1205. Printed in Tbilisi, Kingdom of Kartli, modern Republic of Georgia.

This article contains information about the literary events and publications of 1712.

== Events ==
- July 7 – Henry St. John is raised to the peerage of Great Britain as Viscount Bolingbroke for services in Robert Harley's Tory ministry.
- August 14 – Alexander Pope outlines his project for a satirical periodical, The Works of the Unlearned, from which develops the Scriblerus Club, whose members include Pope, Jonathan Swift, John Gay, Thomas Parnell, Robert Harley, Henry St John, 1st Viscount Bolingbroke, and Dr John Arbuthnot at whose house they meet.
- August 23 – Lady Mary Pierrepont marries Edward Wortley Montagu, after an elopement.
- October 31 – King Philip V of Spain establishes the Biblioteca Nacional de España as the Palace Public Library (Biblioteca Pública de Palacio) in Madrid.
- November 4 – Jonathan Swift foils a murder attempt on Robert Harley, 1st Earl of Oxford and Earl Mortimer, in what becomes known as the Bandbox Plot.
- November 7 – Charles Johnson's dramatisation of episodes from the life of Henry Every, The Successful Pyrate, receives its première at the Theatre Royal, Drury Lane. Although it is primarily satirical, John Dennis subsequently complains to Charles Killigrew, Master of the Revels, that the play glamorizes pirates. The controversy contributes to its theatrical success.
- unknown date – Shota Rustaveli's 12th-century poem The Knight in the Panther's Skin is first printed, in Tbilisi.

== New books ==
=== Prose ===
- John Arbuthnot – Law Is a Bottomless Pit (introducing the character of John Bull; first in a series of five tracts collected as The History of John Bull in the same year)
- George Berkeley – Passive Obedience
- Jean-Paul Bignon – Les Avantures d'Abdalla, fils d'Hanif (The adventures of Abdalla, son of Hanif)
- Richard Blackmore – Creation
- James Brome – Travels through Portugal, Spain, and Italy
- Sir Thomas Browne – Posthumous Works of the Learned Sir Thomas Browne
- Samuel Clarke – The Scripture-Doctrine of the Trinity
- Daniel Defoe (attrib) – A Further Search into the Conduct of the Allies
- John Dennis – An Essay upon the Genius and Writings of Shakespear
- William Diaper
  - Dryaides
  - Nereides
- Thomas Ellwood – Davideis: the Life of David, King of Israel
- John Gay – The Mohocks
- Bernard de Mandeville – Typhon
- John Oldmixon
  - The Dutch Barrier Ours
  - Reflections on Dr Swift's Letter to the Earl of Oxford, about the English Tongue
  - The Secret History of Europe
- Thomas Otway – The Works of Mr. Thomas Otway
- Woodes Rogers – A Cruising Voyage round the World: first to the South-Sea, thence to the East-Indies, and homewards by the Cape of Good Hope
- Nicholas Rowe – Callipaedia (translation)
- George Sewell – The Patriot
- Richard Steele (as Scoto-Brittanus) – The Englishman's Thanks to the Duke of Marlborough
- Jonathan Swift
  - A Proposal for Correcting, Improving and Ascertaining the English Tongue (signed)
  - Some Advice Humbly Offer'd to the Members of the October Club
- Leonard Welsted – The Works of Dionysius Longinus, on the Sublime (among earliest translations of περί ύπσος in English)

=== Drama ===
- Susanna Centlivre – The Perplex'd Lovers
- Pierre de Marivaux – Le Père prudent et equitable
- Charles Johnson – The Successful Pyrate
- John Philips – The Distrest Mother

=== Poetry ===
- George Granville, Lord Lansdowne – Poems Upon Several Occasions
- Peter Anthony Motteux – A Poem Upon Tea
- John Philips (died 1709) – Poems
- Alexander Pope
  - The Rape of the Lock (first version, anonymous)
  - Miscellaneous Poems and Translations
- Matthew Prior – Erle Robert's Mice (imitation of Chaucer)
- Thomas Tickell – A Poem, to his Excellency the Lord Privy-Seal
- John Wright – The Best Mirth (hymns)

See also 1712 in poetry

== Births ==
- March 22 – Edward Moore, English dramatist (died 1757)
- June 28 – Jean-Jacques Rousseau, Swiss philosopher (died 1778)
- September 15 – Pierre Simon Fournier, French typographer (died 1768)
- November 1 – Antonio Genovesi, Italian philosopher (died 1769)
- December 11 – Count Francesco Algarotti, Italian philosopher and art critic. (died 1764)
- unknown date – Richard Glover, English poet (died 1785)

== Deaths ==
- February 5 (burial) – John Norris, English philosopher and poet (born 1657)
- April 5 – Jan Luyken, Dutch poet and artist (born 1649)
- April 11 – Richard Simon, French Biblical critic and priest (born 1638)
- April 30 – Philipp van Limborch, Dutch theologian (born 1633)
- June 12 – Carlo Alessandro Guidi, Italian poet (born 1650)
- August 3 – Joshua Barnes, English scholar and Utopian fiction writer (born 1654)
- September 23 – Thomas Halyburton, Scottish theologian (born 1674)
- December 25 – William King, English poet (born 1663)
- probable – Edward Howard, English playwright and poet (born 1624)
