= 1707 in literature =

| List of years in literature | (table) |
- … 1697; 1698; 1699; 1700; 1701; 1702; 1703; 1704; 1705; 1706; 1707; 1708; 1709; 1710; 1711; 1712; 1713; 1714; 1715; 1716; 1717 …
- In poetry 1704 1705 1706 1707 1708 1709 1710
- Art; Archaeology; Architecture; Literature; Music; Philosophy; Science; +...

This article contains information about the literary events and publications of 1707.

== Events ==
- January – The publisher Edmund Curll announces he will publish Matthew Prior's Poems on Several Occasions, even though the rights belong to someone else.
- March 8 – George Farquhar's Restoration comedy The Beaux' Stratagem is first staged, at the Theatre Royal, Haymarket, London.
- May 1 – The new sovereign Kingdom of Great Britain comes into being under the Acts of Union. It combines the Kingdom of England and the Kingdom of Scotland into a single realm under Anne, Queen of Great Britain. Supporters of this include Daniel Defoe and John Arbuthnot.
- May 30 – Thomas Wilson, Anglican Bishop of Sodor and Man, publishes Principles and Duties of Christianity... in English and Manks (Coyrie Sodjey), the first book in the Manx language.
- September 9 – Richard Steele marries Mary Scurlock. Their literary marriage gains fame through their correspondence.

== New books ==
=== Prose ===
- Anonymous
  - Memoirs of the Court of England (translation)
  - The History of the Earl of Warwick; Sirnam'd the King-maker (transl.)
- Richard Baxter – The Poetical Works of the Late Richard Baxter
- Thomas Brown – The Works of Mr Thomas Brown
- Anthony Collins – Essay Concerning the Use of Reason
- Jean de Beaugué – Histoire de la guerre d'Ecosse (translation by Patrick Abercromby)
- François Pétis de la Croix (translated and adapted) – Contes Turcs (Turkish Tales)
- Thomas D'Urfey – Stories, Moral and Comical
- Laurence Echard – The History of England vol. 1
- William Fleetwood – Chronicon Preciosum
- Aaron Hart – Urim v'tumim (the first book printed in Hebrew in London)
- Alain-René Lesage – Le Diable boiteux (The Devil upon Two Sticks)
- Edward Lhuyd – Archaeologia Britannica: an Account of the Languages, Histories and Customs of Great Britain...
- Delarivière Manley – The Lady's Pacquet of Letters (fiction)
- Isaac Newton – Arithmetica Universalis
- John Oldmixon – The Muses Mercury (periodical)
- Matthäus Schiner – A Philippick Oration to Incite the English Against the French (translated by John Toland)
- Hans Sloane – A Voyage to the Islands Madera, Barbados, Nieves, S. Christophers and Jamaica, v. 1
- Dr. Thomas Smith – Vitæ quorundam Eruditissimorum et Illustrium Virorum
- Jonathan Swift – A Critical Essay upon the Faculties of the Mind
- Matthew Tindal – A Defence of the Rights of the Christian Church (sequel to 1706 work)
- Catherine Trotter – A Discourse Concerning a Guide in Controversies
- Isaac Watts – Hymns and Spiritual Songs (frequently reprinted)
- John Wilmot, Earl of Rochester – The Miscellaneous Works of the Late Earls of Rochester and Roscommon

=== Drama ===
- Joseph Addison – Rosamond (opera)
- Susanna Centlivre – The Platonick Lady
- Colley Cibber
  - The Lady's Last Stake
  - The Double Gallant
- Prosper Jolyot de Crébillon – Atrée et Thyeste
- George Farquhar – The Beaux' Stratagem
- Alain-René Lesage – Crispin rival de son maître
- Peter Anthony Motteux – Thomyris, Queen of Scythia (opera)
- Nicholas Rowe – The Royal Convert
- Nahum Tate – Injur'd Love (an adaptation of Webster's The White Devil)

=== Poetry ===
- Samuel Cobb – Poems on Several Occasions
- John Pomfret – Quae Rara, Chara (poem)
- Nicholas Rowe – A Poem Upon the Late Glorious Successes
- Nahum Tate – The Triumph of Union

== Births ==
- January 13 – John Boyle, 5th Earl of Cork, English writer (died 1762)
- January 28 (baptized) – John Baskerville, English printer and typographer (died 1775)
- February 14 – Claude Prosper Jolyot de Crébillon, French novelist (died 1777)
- February 25 – Carlo Goldoni, Venetian dramatist (died 1793)
- April 20 – Robert Foulis, Scottish printer and publisher (died 1776)
- April 22 – Henry Fielding, English novelist (died 1754)
- June 22 (baptized) – Elizabeth Blackwell, Scottish botanic writer and illustrator (died 1758)
- August 14 – Johann August Ernesti, German philologist (died 1781)
- September 7 – Georges-Louis Leclerc, Comte de Buffon, French philosopher (died 1788)
- December 18 – Charles Wesley, English hymnist, religious writer and cleric (died 1788)
- unknown date – Moshe Chaim Luzzatto, Italian rabbi, kabbalist and philosopher (died 1746)

== Deaths ==
- January 20 – Humphrey Hody, English theologian (born 1659)
- April 20 – George Farquhar, Irish dramatist (born 1677)
- June 23 – John Mill, English theologian and exegete (born c. 1645)
- August 17 – Petter Dass, Norwegian poet (born 1647)
- September 15 – George Stepney, English poet and diplomat (born 1663)
- September 23 – John Tutchin, English controversialist (born c. 1660–64)
- September 24 – Vincenzo da Filicaja, Italian poet (born 1642)
- December 27 – Jean Mabillon, French scholar (born 1632)
