= 1785 in literature =

This article contains information about the literary events and publications of 1785.

== Events ==
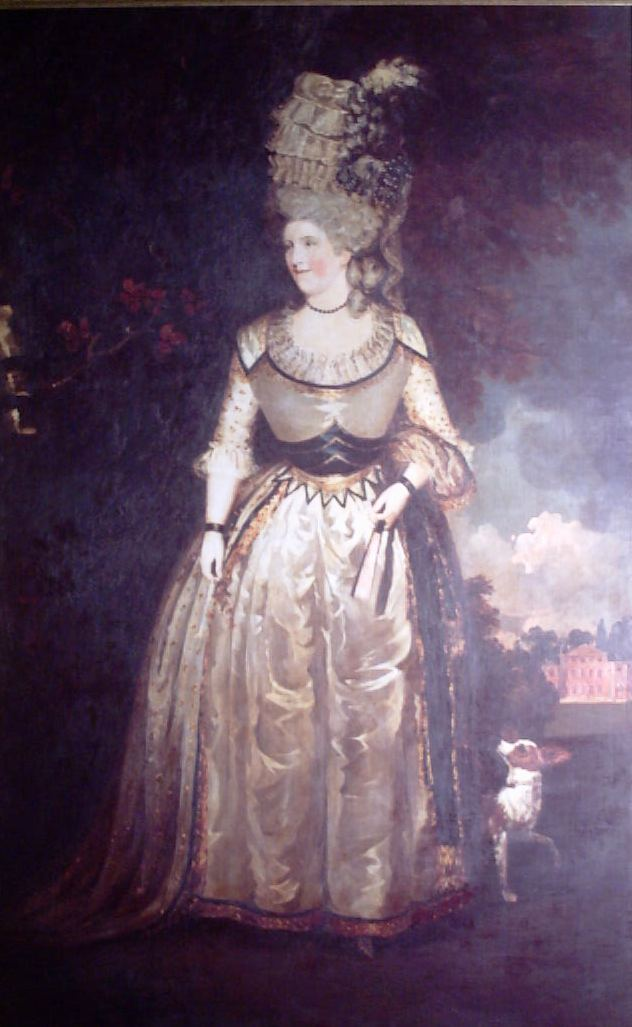
Mary Bowes, Countess of Strathmore and Kinghorne

- January 1
  - The Daily Universal Register (later The Times) is first published, in London.
  - The Paris theatre company Théâtre des Variétés-Amusantes moves to a temporary new building in the gardens of the Palais-Royal.
- February 2 – Sarah Siddons makes her London debut in her most famous rôle, Lady Macbeth, at the Theatre Royal, Drury Lane.
- February – The English heiress Mary Bowes escapes from her husband, Andrew Robinson Stoney, and begins divorce proceedings.
- April 14 – After today's death of the English poet William Whitehead in London, Thomas Warton succeeds him as Poet Laureate of Great Britain, William Mason having refused the post.
- May 22 – Robert Burns' first child, Elizabeth ("Dear-bought Bess"), is born to his mother's servant, Elizabeth Paton.
- June 23 – The Litvak rabbi and writer Aryeh Leib ben Asher Gunzberg dies at Metz in France after a book-case topples on him, according to tradition.
- November 28 – The Marquis de Sade finishes writing The 120 Days of Sodom (Les 120 Journées de Sodome) while imprisoned in the Bastille; it will not be published until 1904.
- unknown date
  - Giacomo Casanova is appointed librarian to Count Joseph Karl von Waldstein at the Duchcov Château in Bohemia.
  - A new building for the Prussian Royal Library is completed in Berlin.

== New books ==
=== Fiction ===
- Anna Maria Bennett – Anna
- Elizabeth Blower – Maria
- Denis Diderot, part trans. Johann Wolfgang von Goethe – Jacques the Fatalist (Jacques der Fatalist und sein Herr)
- Richard Graves – Eugenius
- Karl Philipp Moritz – Anton Reiser (to 1790)

=== Children ===
- Rudolf Erich Raspe, anonymously – Baron Munchausen's Narrative of his Marvellous Travels and Campaigns in Russia

=== Drama ===
- George Colman the Younger – Two to One
- Richard Cumberland – The Natural Son
- Elizabeth Inchbald
  - Appearance Is Against Them
  - I'll Tell You What
- Leonard MacNally – Fashionable Levities
- Frederick Reynolds – Werter
- Emanuel Schikaneder – Der Fremde

=== Poetry ===
- János Bacsanyi – The Valour of the Magyars
- Samuel Egerton Brydges – Sonnets and other Poems
- Robert Burns – "To a Mouse"
- William Combe – The Royal Dream
- William Cowper – The Task
- George Crabbe – The News-Paper
- William Hayley – A Philosophical, Historical and Moral Essay on Old Maids
- Samuel Johnson – The Poetical Works
- Friedrich Schiller – Ode to Joy (An die Freude)
- Charles Wilkins (translator) – Bhagvat-geeta, or Dialogues of Kreeshna and Arjoon
- John Wolcot as "Peter Pindar"
  - The Lousiad
  - Lyric Odes, for the Year 1785
- Ann Yearsley – Poems

=== Non-fiction ===
- Ethan Allen – Reason: the Only Oracle of Man
- James Boswell – The Journal of a Tour to the Hebrides with Samuel Johnson, LL.D.
- Edmund Burke – Speech on the Nabob of Arcot's Debts
- Francis Grose – A Classical Dictionary of the Vulgar Tongue
- Samuel Johnson – Prayers and Meditations
- Immanuel Kant – Groundwork of the Metaphysic of Morals (Grundlegung zur Metaphysik der Sitten)
- William Paley – The Principles of Moral and Political Philosophy
- Clara Reeve – The Progress of Romance
- Thomas Reid – Essays on the Intellectual Powers of Man
- John Scott – Critical Essays on Some of the Poems of Several English Poets

== Births ==
- January 4 – Jakob Grimm, German philologist, jurist and mythologist (died 1863)
- January 31 – Magdalena Dobromila Rettigová, Czech cookery writer (died 1845)
- March 3 – Frances Mary Richardson Currer, English heiress and bibliophile (died 1861)
- March 7 – Alessandro Manzoni, Italian poet and novelist (died 1873)
- March 18 – He Changling (賀長齡), Chinese scholar and writer on governance (died 1848)
- March 21 – Henry Kirke White, English poet (died 1806)
- April 4 – Bettina von Arnim, German novelist (died 1859)
- April 7 – Lorenzo Hammarsköld, Swedish poet and author (died 1827)
- May 3 – Vicente López y Planes, Argentine politician and writer (died 1856)
- May 18 – John Wilson (Christopher North), Scottish writer (died 1854)
- August 15 – Thomas De Quincey, English essayist (died 1859)
- October 18 – Thomas Love Peacock, English novelist, poet and East India Company official (died 1866)
- October 30 – Hermann, Fürst von Pückler-Muskau – German travel and gardening writer (died 1871)
- unknown date – Neofit Bozveli, Bulgarian educator and clergyman, early figure in the Bulgarian National Revival (died 1848)

== Deaths ==
- January 19 – Jonathan Toup, English classicist, critic and cleric (born 1713)
- April 14 – William Whitehead, English poet laureate (born 1715)
- May 4 – János Sajnovics, Hungarian linguist (born 1733)
- August 31 – Pietro Chiari, Italian playwright, novelist and librettist (born 1712)
- September 17 – Antoine Léonard Thomas, French poet and critic (born 1732)
- November 12 – Richard Burn, English legal writer (born 1709)
- November 25 – Richard Glover, English poet and politician (born 1712)
- December 6 – Kitty Clive, English actress and writer of farce (born 1711)
- December 18 – Joseph Allegranza, Milanese historian (born 1715)
- December 29 – Johan Herman Wessel, Norwegian-born Danish poet and satirist (born 1742)
- unknown date – Ali Haider Multani, Punjabi Sufi poet (born 1690)
