= 1708 in poetry =

List of years in poetry	(table)
- … 1698; 1699; 1700; 1701; 1702; 1703; 1704; 1705; 1706; 1707; 1708; 1709; 1710; 1711; 1712; 1713; 1714; 1715; 1716; 1717; 1718 …
- In literature 1705 1706 1707 1708 1709 1710 1711
- Art; Archaeology; Architecture; Literature; Music; Philosophy; Science; +...

Nationality words link to articles with information on the nation's poetry or literature (for instance, Irish or France).

Now crowds to Founder Bocaj [Jacob Tonson] did resort

And for his Favour humbly made their Court.
The little Wits attended at his Gate
And Men of Title did his Levee wait;
For he, as Sovereign by Prerogative,
Old Members did exclude, and new receive.
He judg'd who most were for the Order fit,

And Chapters held to make new Knights of Wit.

-- From Richard Blackmore's The Kit-Kats. A Poem, Chapter 6, published this year and referring to the Kit-Kat Club in which the influential publisher Jacob Tonson was a prominent member. Tonson was influential in getting recognition for many poets in his series of anthologies.

== Events ==
- July 14 – Joseph Trapp becomes the first Oxford Professor of Poetry.

== Works published ==
- Edmund Arwaker, Truth in Fiction; or, Morality in Masquerade
- Sir Richard Blackmore, The Kit-Cats
- Ebenezer Cooke (also spelled "Cook"), The Sot-Weed Factor: Or, a Voyage to Maryland. A Satyr. In which is describ'd The Laws, Government, Courts, and Constitution of the Country; and also the Buildings, Feasts, Frolics, Entertainments, and Drunken Humours of the Inhabitants of that Part of America, a satirical poem by an English Colonial American in Maryland published in England
- Elijah Fenton, Oxford and Cambridge Miscellany Poems
- John Gay, Wine, published anonymously
- Charles Gildon, Libertas Triumphans, on the battle of Oudenarde, July 11
- Aaron Hill, The Celebrated Speeches of Ajax and Ulysses for the Armour of Achilles, published anonymously, translated from Ovid's Metamorphoses
- William King, The Art of Cookery
- John Philips, Cyder
- Matthew Prior, Poems on Several Occasions, published this year, although the book states "1709"
- Benjamin Tompson, The Gramarrian's Funeral, English Colonial America
- Isaac Watts, Hymns and Spiritual Songs

== Births ==
Death years link to the corresponding "[year] in poetry" article:

- April 23 – Friedrich von Hagedorn (died 1754), German poet
- July 19 – Philip Francis, (died 1773), Anglo-Irish translator, poet and playwright
- August 29 – Olof von Dalin (died 1763), Swedish poet
- October 16 – Albrecht von Haller (died 1777), Swiss physiologist and poet
- December 8 – Sir Charles Hanbury Williams (died 1759), Welsh-born English diplomat and satirical poet
- December 18 – John Collier (died 1786) English caricaturist and satirical poet known by the pseudonym "Tim(othy) Bobbin"
- Also:
  - Georg Heinrich Behr (died 1761), German poet
  - John Seccomb (died c. 1783), Colonial American clergyman and poet
  - Elizabeth Scott (died 1776), Colonial American poet
  - Thomas Seward (died 1790), English poet
  - Jane Turell (died 1735), Colonial American poet, daughter of Benjamin Colman

== Deaths ==
Birth years link to the corresponding "[year] in poetry" article:

- March 15 – William Walsh (born 1662), English poet and critic
- October 21 – Kata Szidónia Petrőczy (born 1659), Hungarian Baroque writer
- December 27 – Johanna Eleonora De la Gardie (born 1661), Swedish poet
- Also:
  - Francisco Ayerra de Santa María (born 1630), first native-born Puerto Rican poet
  - Pan Lei (born 1646), Chinese Qing dynasty scholar and poet

== See also ==
- Poetry
- List of years in poetry
- List of years in literature

== Notes ==
- "A Timeline of English Poetry" Web page of the Representative Poetry Online Web site, University of Toronto
