= 1641 in literature =

This article contains information about the literary events and publications of 1641.

== Events ==
- March 12 – Abraham Cowley's play The Guardian is acted at Trinity College, Cambridge, in the presence of Prince Charles (later King Charles II).
- Spring – Pierre Corneille marries Marie de Lampérière.
- c. May – William Davenant is convicted of high treason for his part in the First Army Plot in England and flees to France.
- August 5 – Because of an increase in cases of bubonic plague, John Lowin delivers warrants to London theatres ordering them to close.

== New books ==
=== Prose ===
- George Abbot – Vindiciae Sabbathi
- Moses Amyraut – De l'elevation de la foy et de l'abaissement de la raison en la creance des mysteres de la religion
- Richard Baker – Apologie for Laymen's Writing in Divinity, with a Short Meditation upon the Fall of Lucifer
- Luís Vélez de Guevara – El Diablo cojuelo
- René Descartes – Meditations on First Philosophy
- William Habington – Observations upon History
- Joseph Hall – Episcopacy by Divine Right
- Samuel Hartlib (nominal author, really by Gabriel Plattes) – A Description of the Famous Kingdom of Macaria
- Thomas Heywood – The Life of Merlin surnamed Ambrosius
- Sir Francis Kynaston – Leoline and Sydanis
- John Milton – Of Reformation
- Sir Robert Naunton (died 1635) – Fragmenta Regalia, or Observations on the late Queen Elizabeth, her Times and Favourites
- Mother Shipton (died 1561, attributed) – The prophesie of Mother Shipton in the raigne of King Henry the eighth
- Sir Henry Spelman – De Sepultura
- Heinrich Stahl – Leyen Spiegel
- John Taylor – John Taylors Last Voyage and Adventure
- Nicolaes Tulp – Observationes Medicae
- John Wilkins – Mercury, or The Secret and Swift Messenger
- Francisco de Quevedo – Providencia de Dios
- Juan Eusebio Nieremberg – De la hermosura de Dios y su amabilidad, por las infinitas perfecciones del ser divino
- Luis Vélez de Guevara – El diablo Cojuelo

=== Drama ===
- Richard Braithwaite – Mercurius Britanicus
- Richard Brome – A Jovial Crew
- Abraham Cowley – The Guardian
- John Day – The Parliament of Bees (published)
- John Denham – The Sophy
- Thomas Killigrew – The Prisoners and Claricilla (published)
- Shackerley Marmion – The Antiquary (published)
- James Shirley – The Cardinal
- John Tatham – The Distracted State
- Lope de Vega (died 1635) – El caballero de Olmedo (posthumous, written in 1620)
- Jan Vos – Aran en Titus, of wraak en weerwraak (Aran and Titus, or Revenge and Vengeance)

== Births ==
- April 8 (baptised) – William Wycherley, English playwright (died 1716)
- April 15 – Robert Sibbald, Scottish historian (died 1722)
- March 15 (baptised) – Laurence Hyde, 1st Earl of Rochester, English politician and writer (died 1711)
- May 16 – Dudley North, English economist, merchant and politician (died 1691)
- May – Juan Núñez de la Peña, Spanish historian (died 1721)
- Late October – Henry Dodwell, Irish-born theologian (died 1711)
- unknown dates
  - Pierre Allix, French-born Protestant preacher and writer (died 1717)
  - William Sherlock, English churchman and theologian (died 1707)

== Deaths ==
- January 11
  - Franciscus Gomarus, Dutch theologian (born 1563)
  - Juan de Jáuregui, Spanish poet and painter (born 1583)
- February 15 – Sara Copia Sullam, Italian poet and writer (born 1592)
- April 6 (buried) – Thomas Nabbes, English dramatist (born 1605)
- April 13 – Richard Montagu, English bishop and religious controversialist (born 1577)
- June 26 – Antony Hickey, Irish Franciscan theologian (born 1586)
- July 15 – Arthur Johnston, Scottish poet and physician (born c. 1579)
- August 9 – Augustine Baker, Welsh-born Benedictine mystic and ascetic writer, of plague (born 1575)
- August 16 – Thomas Heywood, English playwright, actor, poet and author (born c. 1573)
- August (between 14 and 27) – Sir William Vaughan, Welsh writer and colonist (born 1575)
