= Francis Knapp =

Irish Anglican priest (1672–1717)

Francis Knapp (1672–1717) was an Anglican priest in Ireland during the 18th century.

Knapp was born in Chilton, Berkshire and educated at St John's College, Oxford. He was Dean of Killala from 1701 until his death.
