= Bernardine a Piconio =

French theologian

Bernardine a Piconio (Henri Bernardine de Picquigny) (1633 – 8 December 1709) was a French Capuchin theologian and exegete.

== Biography ==
Bernardine a Piconio was born and educated at Picquigny, Picardy, and joined the Capuchins in 1649. He died in Paris in 1709.

== Works ==
His works included:

- Triplex expositio epistolarum sancti Pauli (Paris, 1703 [French], 1706 [English, tr. Prichard], London, 1888), his best-known work
- Triplex expositio in sacrosancta D. N. Jesu Christi Evangelia (Paris, 1726)
- a book of moral instructions

A complete edition of his works, Opera omnia Bernardini a Piconio, was published at Paris (1870–1872).
