= 1715 in architecture =

The year 1715 in architecture involved some significant events.

== Buildings and structures ==
=== Buildings ===
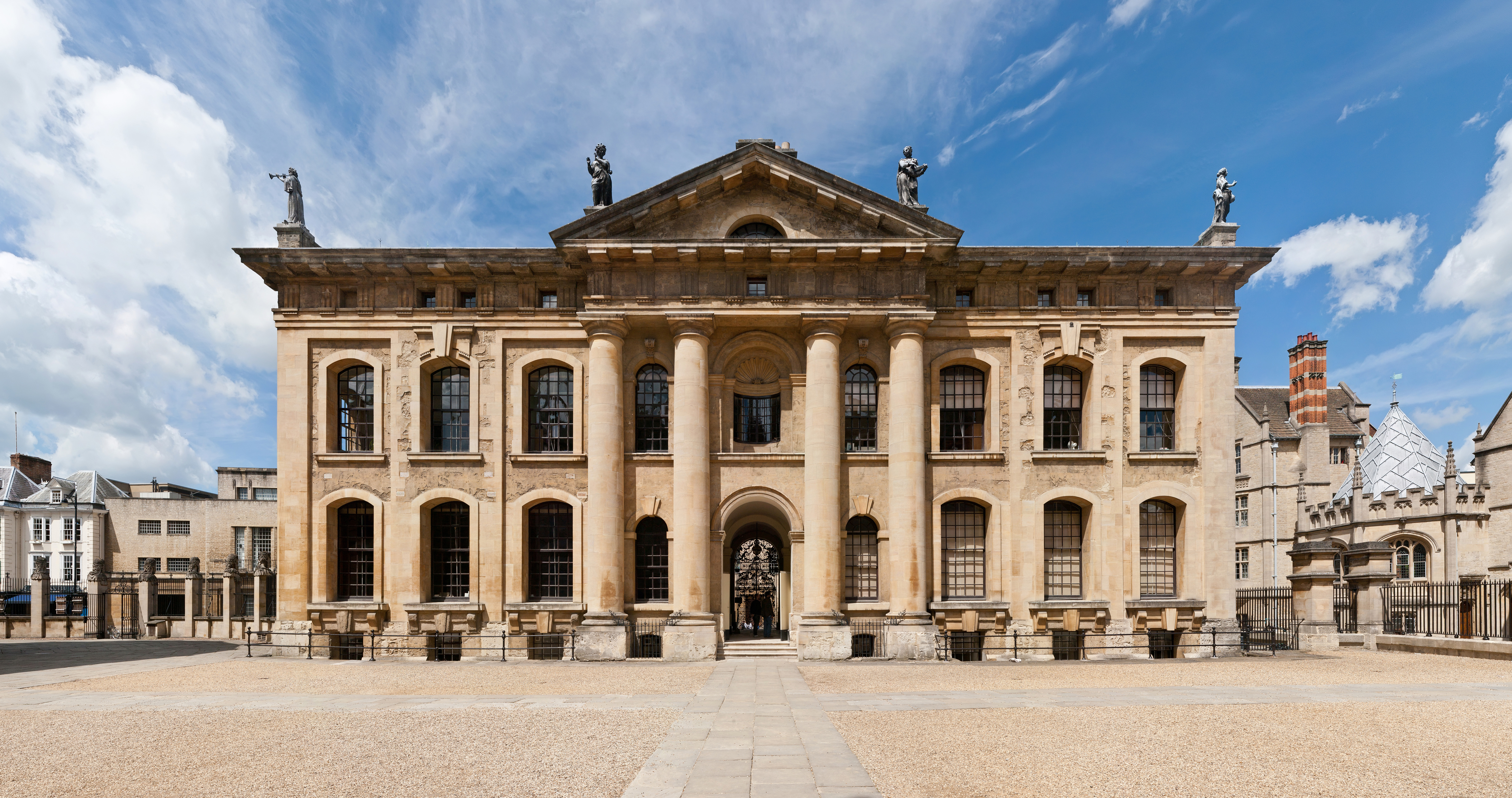
Clarendon Building

- The Clarendon Building at the University of Oxford, England, designed by Nicholas Hawksmoor, is completed.
- Chapel and Hall, The Queen's College, Oxford, England, designed by George Clarke after Hawksmoor, structurally completed.
- St Philip's Cathedral, Birmingham, England, designed by Thomas Archer is consecrated as a parish church.
- Many batteries and redoubts are built in Malta. Surviving examples include Saint Mary's Battery, Qolla l-Bajda Battery, Briconet Redoubt and Vendôme Tower.
- Filippo Juvarra starts working on the previously postponed construction of the church of Santa Christina in Turin.
- Filippo Juvarra starts rebuilding the church of San Filippo Neri, Turin in which the roof had collapsed during the siege of Turin during the War of the Spanish Succession.
- Fountain of the Tritons in Rome completed by Carlo Francesco Bizzaccheri.
- Clarence House, 22 Watling Street, Thaxted, England, is completed.

== Events ==
- Colen Campbell publishes the first volume of Vitruvius Britannicus, or the British Architect.
