= Augustan poetry =

Style of 18th century British poetry

In English literature, Augustan poetry is a branch of Augustan literature, and refers to the poetry of the 18th century, specifically the first half of the century. The term comes most originally from a term that George I had used for himself. He saw himself as an Augustus. Therefore, the British poets picked up that term as a way of referring to their endeavours, for it fitted in another respect: 18th-century English poetry was political, satirical, and marked by the central philosophical problem of whether the individual or society took precedence as the subject of the verse.

== Overview ==
In the British literary period known as the 'Augustan era,' poets were more conversant with each other's writings than were the contemporary novelists (see Augustan prose). They wrote in counterpoint, directly expanding each other's works, and using satire to heighten their oppositional voices. In the early part of the century, there was a great struggle over the nature and role of the pastoral, primarily between Ambrose Philips and Alexander Pope, and then between their followers, but such a controversy was only possible because of two simultaneous literary movements. The general movement, carried forward only with the struggle between poets, was the same as in the novel: the invention of the subjective self as a worthy topic, the emergence of a priority on individual psychology, against the insistence that all acts of art are a performance and a public gesture meant for the benefit of society at large. Beneath that large banner raged individual battles. The other development, one seemingly agreed upon by both sides, was a gradual expropriation and reinvention of all the Classical forms of poetry. Every genre of poetry was recast, reconsidered, and used to serve new functions. The ode, the ballad, the elegy, and satire, parody, song and lyric poetry, would be adapted from their older, initial literary uses. Odes would cease to be encomia, ballads would cease to be narratives, elegies would cease to be sincere memorials, satires no longer would be specific entertainments, parodies no longer would consist of bravura, stylised performances, songs no longer would be personal lyrics, and the lyric would celebrate the individual man and woman, and not the lover's complaint.

These two developments (the emphasis on the person and the writer's willingness to reinvent genre) can be seen as extensions of Protestantism, as Max Weber argued, for they represent a gradual increase in the implications of Martin Luther's doctrine of the priesthood of all believers and the Calvinist emphasis on individual revelation of the divine (and therefore the competence and worth of the individual). It can be seen as a growth of the power and assertiveness of the bourgeoisie and an echo of the displacement of the worker from the home in growing industrialization, as Marxists such as E. P. Thompson has argued, for people were no longer allowed to remain in their families and communities when they had to travel to a factory or mill, and therefore they grew accustomed to thinking of themselves as isolated. It can be argued that the development of the subjective individual against the social individual was a natural reaction to trade over other methods of economic production, or as a reflection of a breakdown in social cohesion unconsciously set in motion by enclosure and the migration of the poor to the cities. There are many other plausible and coherent explanations of the causes of the rise of the subjective self, but whatever the prime cause, poets showed the strains of the development as a largely conservative set of voices argued for a social person and largely emergent voices argued for the person.

== Alexander Pope, the Scriblerians, and poetry as social act ==
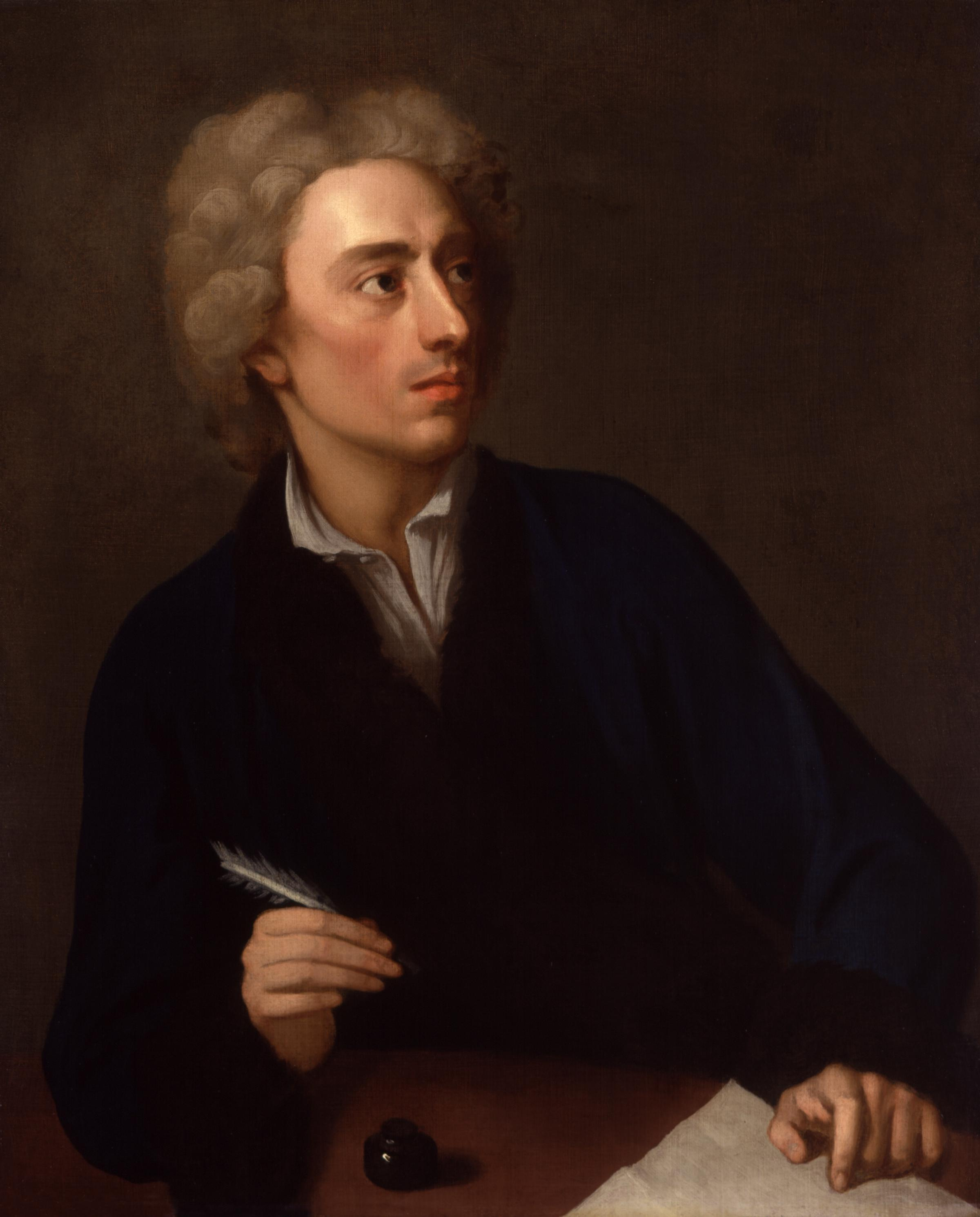
Alexander Pope, the single poet who most influenced the Augustan age.

The entire Augustan age's poetry was dominated by Alexander Pope. Since Pope began publishing when very young and continued to the end of his life, his poetry is a reference point in any discussion of the 1710s, 1720s, 1730s or even 1740s. Furthermore, Pope's abilities were recognized early in his career, so contemporaries acknowledged his superiority, for the most part. Indeed, seldom has a poet been as publicly acknowledged as a leader for as long as was Pope, and, unlike the case with figures such as John Dryden or William Wordsworth, a second generation did not emerge to eclipse his position. From a technical point of view, few poets have ever approached Alexander Pope's perfection at the iambic pentameter closed couplet ("heroic verse"), and his lines were repeated often enough to lend quite a few clichés and proverbs to modern English usage. However, if Pope had few rivals, he had many enemies. His technical perfection did not shelter him from political, philosophical or religious opponents, and Pope himself was quarrelsome in print. His very technical superiority led Pope to injudicious improvements in his editing and translation of other authors. However, Pope and his enemies (often called "the Dunces" because of Pope's successful satirizing of them in The Dunciad of 1727 and 1738) fought over central matters of the proper subject matter for poetry and the proper pose of the poetic voice, and the excesses and missteps as much as the achievements, of both sides demonstrated the stakes of the battle.

The Pope/Philips debate occurred in 1709 when Alexander Pope published his Pastorals. Pope's Pastorals were of the four seasons. When they appeared, Thomas Tickell, a member of the "Little Senate" of Addison's (see above) at Button's coffee shop wrote an evaluation in Guardian that praised Ambrose Philips's pastorals above Pope's. Pope replied by writing in Guardian with rock praise of Philips's Patorals that heaped scorn on them. Pope quoted Philips's worst lines, mocked his execution, and delighted in pointing out his empty lines. Philips responded by putting staff on the floor of Button's with which to beat Pope, should he appear. In 1717, Pope explained his theory of the pastoral in the Discourse on Pastoral Poetry. He argued that any depictions of shepherds and their mistresses in the pastoral must not be updated shepherds, that they must be icons of the Golden Age: "we are not to describe our shepherds as shepherds at this day really are, but as they may be conceived then to have been when the best of men followed the employment" (Gordon). Philips's Pastorals were not particularly awful poems, but they did reflect his desire to "update" the pastoral.

In 1724, Philips would update poetry again by writing a series of odes dedicated to "all ages and characters, from Walpole, the steerer of the realm, to Miss Pulteney in the nursery". To do so, he shortened his line length to 3.5', or almost half a normal iambic pentameter line. Henry Carey was one of the best at satirizing these poems, and his Namby Pamby became a hugely successful obliteration of Philips and Philips's endeavour. What is notable about Philips against Pope, however, is not so much the particular poems and their answers as the fact that both poets were adapting the pastoral and the ode, both altering it. Pope's insistence upon a Golden Age pastoral no less than Philips's desire to update it meant making a political statement. While it is easy to see in Ambrose Philips an effort at modernist triumph, it is no less the case that Pope's artificially restricted pastoral was a statement of what the ideal (based on an older Feudal arrangement) should be.

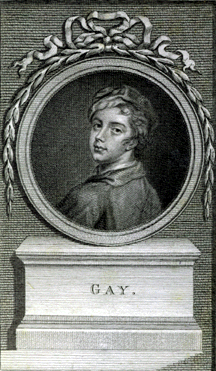
Portrait of John Gay from Samuel Johnson's Lives of the English Poets, the 1779 edition. Gay's gentle satire was a contrast with the harsher Pope and Swift.

The Scriblerus Club wrote poetry as well as prose, and the club included among its number John Gay, who was not only a friend and collaborator of Pope's but also one of the major voices of the era. John Gay, like Pope, adapted the pastoral. Gay, working at Pope's suggestion, wrote a parody of the updated pastoral in The Shepherd's Week. He also imitated the satires of Juvenal with his Trivia. In 1728, his The Beggar's Opera was an enormous success, running for an unheard-of eighty performances. All of these works have in common a gesture of compassion. In Trivia, Gay writes as if commiserating with those who live in London and are menaced by falling masonry and bedpan slops, and The Shepherd's Week features great detail of the follies of everyday life and eccentric character. Even The Beggar's Opera, which is a clear satire of Robert Walpole, portrays its characters with compassion. The villains have pathetic songs in their own right and are acting out of exigency rather than boundless evil. Gay's tone is almost the opposite of Jonathan Swift's. Swift famously said that he hated mankind but loved individual humans, and Gay's poetry shows a love of mankind and a gentle mocking of overly serious or pretentious individuals.

Old-style poetic parody involved imitation of the style of an author to amuse, but not for ridicule. The person imitated was not satirized. Ambrose Philips's idea was of adapting and updating the pastoral to represent a contemporary lyric (i.e. to make it a form for housing the personal love complaints of modern shepherds), where individual personalities would be expressed, and this desire to move from the universal, typical, and idealized shepherd to the real, actual, and individual shepherd was the heart of the debate. Prior to Ambrose Philips, John Philips, whose The Splendid Shilling of 1701 was an imitation of John Milton's blank verse for a discussion of the miseries of poverty, was championed by Addison's Kit-Kats. The Splendid Shilling, like Pope's poetry and the other poetry by the "Tory Wits", is a statement of the social man. The shilling, the poverty, and the complaint are all posited in terms of the man in London, the man in society and conviviality, and not the man as a particular individual or with idiosyncrasies. It was a poem wholly consonant with the poetry of the Scribblerians. After Ambrose Philips, though, poets would begin to speak of peculiarities and actualities, rather than ideals. It is a debate and a poetic tension that would remain all the way to Samuel Johnson's discussion of the "streaks of the tulip" in the last part of the century (Rasselas).

== Translation and adaptation as statement ==
Gay adapted Juvenal, as Pope had already adapted Virgil's Eclogues, and throughout the Augustan era the "updating" of Classical poets was a commonplace. These were not translations, but rather they were imitations of Classical models, and the imitation allowed poets to veil their responsibility for the comments they made. Alexander Pope would manage to refer to the King himself in unflattering tones by "imitating" Horace in his Epistle to Augustus. Similarly, Samuel Johnson wrote a poem that falls into the Augustan period in his "imitation of Satire III" entitled London. The imitation was inherently conservative, since it argued that all that was good was to be found in the old classical education, but these imitations were used for progressive purposes, as the poets who used them were often doing so to complain of the political situation.

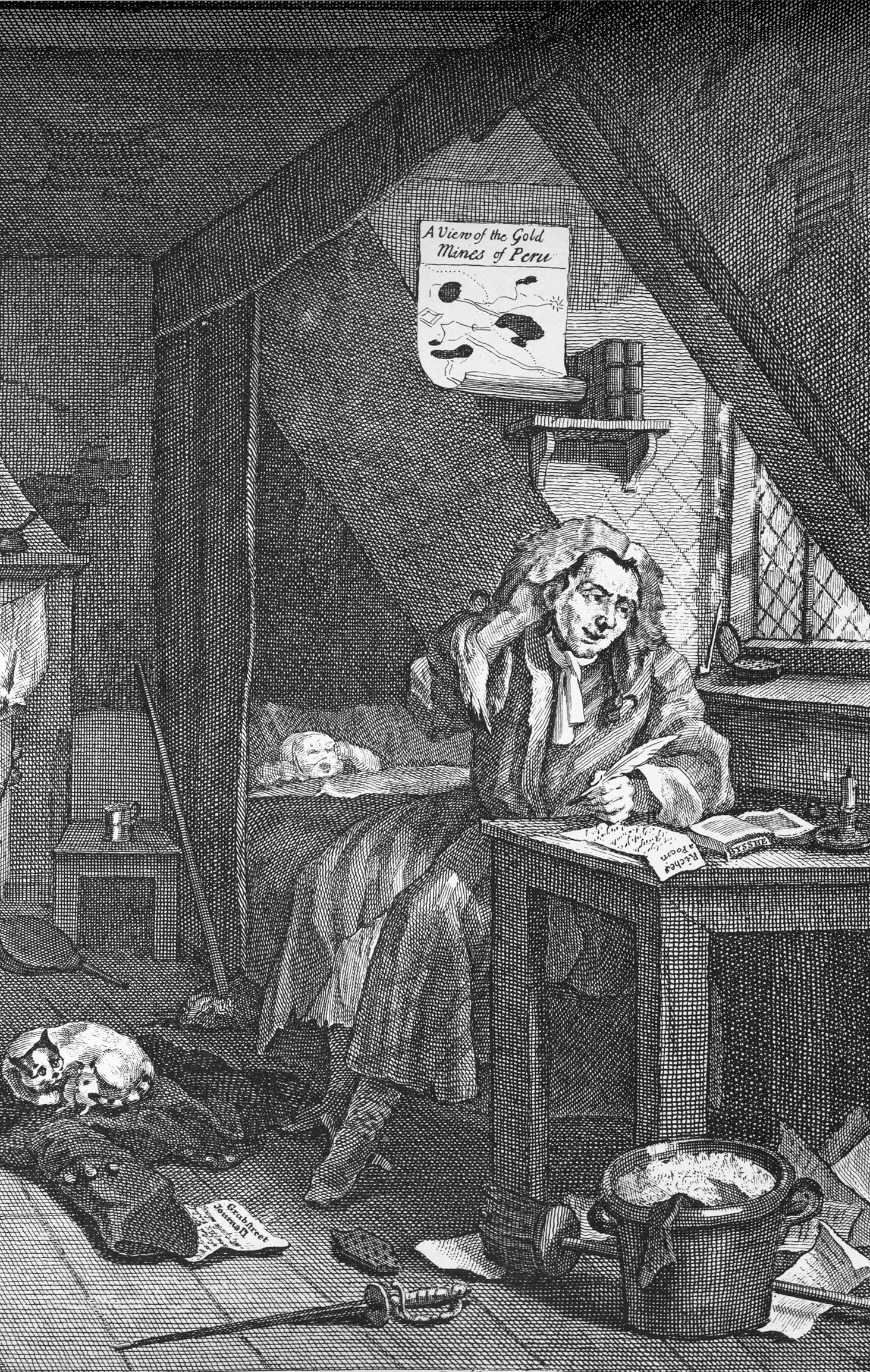
A "hack" poet desperate for money, from William Hogarth's 1741 print The Distrest Poet.

Readers of adaptations were assumed to know the originals. Indeed, original translation was one of the standard tests in grammar school. Pope's translation of Homer's Iliad and Odyssey was not an attempt to make the works available to an Augustan audience, but rather to make a new work occupying a middle ground between Homer and Pope. The translation had to be textually accurate, but it was intended to be a Pope translation, with felicity of phrase and neatness of rhyme from Pope. Additionally, Pope would "versify" John Donne, although his work was widely available. The changes Pope makes are the content, the commentary. Pope's edition of Shakespeare claimed to be textually perfect (although it was corrupt), but his desire to adapt led him to injudicious attempts at "smoothing" and "cleaning" Shakespeare's lines.

In satire, Pope achieved two of the greatest poetic satires of all time in the Augustan period, and both arose from the imitative and adaptive demands of parody. The Rape of the Lock (1712 and 1714) was a gentle mock-heroic, but it was built upon Virgil's Aeneid. Pope applied Virgil's heroic and epic structure to the story of a young woman (Arabella Fermor) having a lock of hair snipped by an amorous baron (Lord Petre). The structure of the comparison forced Pope to invent mythological forces to overlook the struggle, and so he borrowed sylphs from ludicrous (to him) alchemist Paracelsus and makes them the ghosts of vain women. He created an epic battle over a game of ombre, leading to a fiendish appropriation of the lock of hair. Finally, a deus ex machina appears and the lock of hair experiences an apotheosis. To some degree, Pope was adapting Jonathan Swift's habit, in A Tale of a Tub, of pretending that metaphors were literal truths, and he was inventing a mythos to go with the everyday. The parody was in no way a comment on Virgil. Instead, it was an imitation made to serve a new purpose. The epic was transformed from a paean to national foundations to a satire on the outlandish self-importance of the country nobility. The poem was an enormous success, at least with the general public.

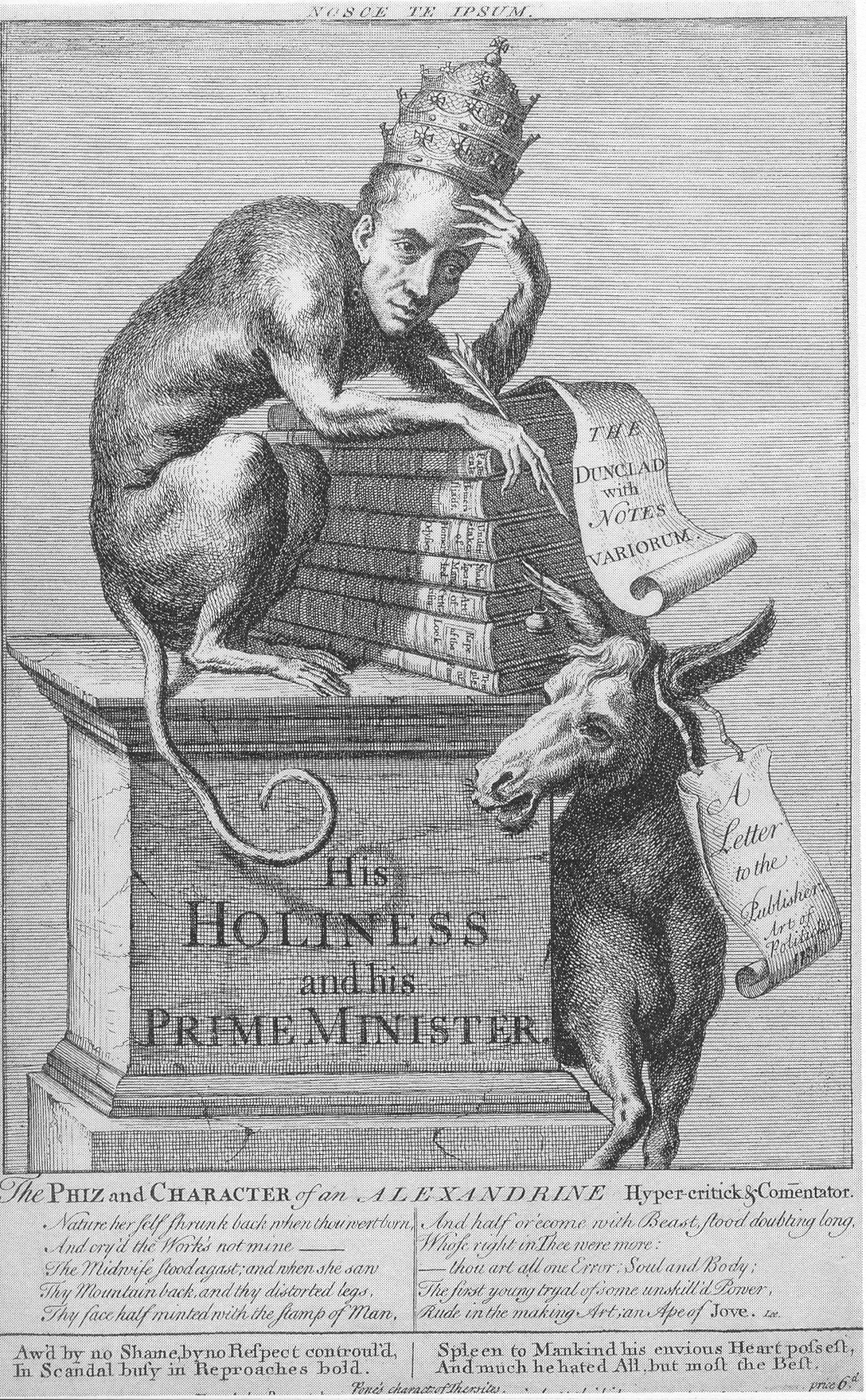
One of the scabrous satirical prints directed against Pope after his Dunciad of 1727.

After that success, Pope wrote some works that were more philosophical and more political and therefore more controversial, such as the Essay on Criticism and Essay on Man, as well as a failed play. As a result, a decade after the gentle, laughing satire of The Rape of the Lock, Pope wrote his masterpiece of invective and specific opprobrium in The Dunciad. Pope had translated Homer and produced an errant edition of William Shakespeare, and the 1727 Dunciad was an updating and redirection of John Dryden's poison-pen battle of MacFlecknoe. The story is that of the goddess Dulness choosing a new avatar. She settles upon one of Pope's personal enemies, Lewis Theobald, and the poem describes the coronation and heroic games undertaken by all of the dunces of Great Britain in celebration of Theobald's ascension. When Pope's enemies responded to The Dunciad with attacks, Pope produced the Dunciad Variorum, which culled from each dunce's attack any comments unflattering to another dunce, assembled the whole into a commentary upon the original Dunciad and added a critical comment by Pope professing his innocence and dignity. In 1743, Pope issued a new version of The Dunciad ("The Dunciad B") with a fourth book added. He also changed the hero from Lewis Theobald to Colley Cibber. In the fourth book of the new Dunciad, Pope expressed the view that, in the battle between light and dark (enlightenment and the Dark Ages), Night and Dulness were fated to win, that all things of value were soon going to be subsumed under the curtain of unknowing.

John Gay and Alexander Pope belong on one side of a line separating the celebrants of the individual and the celebrants of the social. Pope wrote The Rape of the Lock, he said, to settle a disagreement between two great families, to laugh them into peace. He wrote the Essay on Criticism and the Essay on Man to emphasize, time and again, the public nature of human life and the social role of letters. Even The Dunciad, which seems to be a serial killing of everyone on Pope's enemies list, sets up these figures as expressions of dangerous and antisocial forces in letters. Theobald and Cibber are marked by vanity and pride, by having no care for morality, so long as they are famous. The hireling pens Pope attacks mercilessly in the heroic games section of the Dunciad are all embodiments of avarice and lies. Similarly, Gay, although he always has strong touches of personal humor and the details of personal life, writes of political society, of social dangers and of follies that must be addressed to protect the greater whole. On the other side of this line, however, were people who agreed with the politics of Gay and Pope (and Swift), but not in approach.

== Precursors of Romanticism ==
The other side of this division include, early in the Augustan Age, John Dyer, James Thomson and Edward Young. In the year 1726 poems by the two former were published describing landscape from a personal point of view and taking their feeling and moral lessons from direct observation. One was Dyer's "Grongar Hill", the other was James Thomson's "Winter", soon to be followed by all the seasons (1726–30). Both are unlike Pope's notion of the Golden Age pastoral as exemplified in his "Windsor Forest". Mythology is at a minimum and there is no celebration of Britain or the crown. Where the octosyllabic couplets of Dyer's poem celebrate the natural beauty of a mountain view and are quietly meditative, the declamatory blank verse of Thomson's winter meditation is melancholy and soon to establish that emotion as proper for poetic expression.

A William Blake illustration for Edward Young's Night Thoughts.

A notable successor in that line was Edward Yonge's Night Thoughts (1742–1744). It was, even more than "Winter", a poem of deep solitude, melancholy and despair. In all the poems mentioned, there are the stirrings of the lyric as the Romantics would see it: the celebration of the private individual's idiosyncratic, yet paradigmatic, responses to the visions of the world. These works appeared in Pope's lifetime and were popular, but the older, more conservative poetry maintained its hold for a while to come. On the other hand, Thomas Gray's Elegy Written in a Country Churchyard set off a new craze for poetry of melancholy reflection.

Gray's Elegy appeared in 1750, and it immediately set new ground. First, it was written in the "country," and not in or as opposed to London. In fact, the poem makes no reference at all to the life of the city and society, and it follows no classical model. Further, it is not an elegiac in the strictest sense. Also, the poem sets up the solitary observer in a privileged position. It is only by being solitary that the poet can speak of a truth that is wholly individually realized, and the poem is a series of revelations that have been granted only to the contemplative (and superior) mind. After Gray, a group often referred to as the Churchyard Poets began imitating his pose, and occasionally his style. These imitations followed no convenient or conventional political or religious division. Oliver Goldsmith (The Deserted Village), Thomas Warton, and even Thomas Percy (The Hermit of Warkworth), each conservative by and large and Classicist (Gray himself was a professor of Greek), took up the new poetry of solitude and loss. Additionally, Thomas Chatterton, among the younger poets, also followed. The only things these poets had in common was that they were not centered in London (except Chatterton, for a time), and each of them reflected, in one way or another, on the devastation of the countryside.

Therefore, when the Romantics emerged at the end of the 18th century, they were not assuming a radically new invention of the subjective self themselves, but merely formalizing what had gone before. Similarly, the later 18th century saw a ballad revival, with Thomas Percy's Reliques of Ancient English Poetry. The relics were not always very ancient, as many of the ballads dated from only the 17th century (e.g. the Bagford Ballads or The Dragon of Wantley in the Percy Folio), and so what began as an antiquarian movement soon became a folk movement. When this folk-inspired impulse combined with the solitary and individualistic impulse of the Churchyard Poets, Romanticism was nearly inevitable.

== See also ==
- 18th century in poetry
- 18th century in literature
- English literature
- Augustan literature
  - Augustan prose
  - Augustan drama
