= 1716 in literature =

This article contains information about the literary events and publications of 1716.

== Events ==
- April 5 – Anne Lefèvre, Madame Dacier, meets Antoine Houdar de la Motte in person.
- May – Voltaire is exiled to Tulle as a result of his lampoon on the regent of France, Philippe II, Duke of Orléans
- June 21 – Work begins on construction of the Codrington Library at All Souls College, Oxford, to the design of Nicholas Hawksmoor; it will be completed in 1751.
- unknown dates
  - Poet John Byrom returns to Britain to teach his own system of shorthand.
  - Edmund Curll renews his controversy with Matthew Prior by publishing more of the poet's works without permission.
  - The first printed version of the Epic of King Gesar, a Mongolian text, is published in Beijing.

== New books ==
=== Prose ===
- Richard Blackmore – Essays upon Several Subjects vol. i
- Thomas Browne – Christian Morals
- Francis Chute (as Mr. Gay) – The Petticoat (part of Edmund Curll's "phantom Gay" hoax)
- Anthony Ashley Cooper, 3rd Earl of Shaftesbury – Several Letters... to a Young Man at the University
- John Dennis – A True Character of Mr. Pope, and his Writings (in response to The Essay on Criticism)
- Theophilus Evans – Drych y Prif Oesoedd (Mirror of the Early Centuries)
- Amédée-François Frézier – Relation du voyage de la Mer du Sud, aux côtes du Chili, du Pérou et de Brésil
- John Oldmixon – Memoirs of Ireland from the Restoration to the Present Times
- Onania: or, the heinous sin of self-pollution (approximate date)
- Alexander Pope – The Iliad of Homer vol. ii
- Humphrey Prideaux – The Old and New Testament Connected in the History of the Jews and Neighbouring Nations
- Jean de la Roque – Voyage dans l’Arabie heureuse
- Andreas Rüdiger – Göttliche Physik (Divine Physics)
- George Sewell – A Vindication of the English Stage
- Johann Georg Walch – Historia critica Latinae linguae
- Zhang Yushu, Chen Tingjing et al. (ed.) – Kangxi Dictionary (康熙字典)

=== Drama ===
- Joseph Addison – The Drummer
- Barton Booth – The Death of Dido
- Christopher Bullock
  - The Cobbler of Preston
  - Woman Is a Riddle
- José de Cañizares
  - El dómine Lucas
  - Marta la Romarantina
  - El picarillo de España, señor de la Gran Canaria
- Susanna Centlivre – The Cruel Gift
- Mary Davys – The Northern Heiress
- Benjamin Griffin – The Humours of Purgatory
- Aaron Hill – The Fatal Vision
- John Hughes – Apollo and Daphne
- Charles Johnson – The Cobbler of Preston, a rival version to that by Bullock (political satire based on The Taming of the Shrew)
- William Taverner – Everybody Mistaken
- Lewis Theobald – The Perfidious Brother

=== Poetry ===
- Jane Brereton – The Fifth Ode of the Fourth Book of Horace Imitated
- John Gay – Trivia, or The Art of Walking the Streets of London
- Lady Mary Wortley Montagu – Court Poems
- Lewis Theobald – The Odyssey of Homer
- See also 1716 in poetry

== Births ==
- January 20 – Jean-Jacques Barthélemy, French writer and numismatist (died 1795)
- March 6 – Pehr Kalm, Swedish/Finnish botanist, naturalist and travel writer (died 1779)
- December 25 – Johann Jakob Reiske, German scholar and physician (died 1774)
- December 26
  - Thomas Gray, English poet (died 1771)
  - Jean François de Saint-Lambert, French poet, philosopher and military officer (died 1803)
- unknown date – Yosa Buson (与謝 蕪村), Japanese Edo period haiku poet and painter (died 1784)

== Deaths ==
- January 5
  - Jean Chardin, French travel writer (born 1643)
  - Hippolyte Hélyot, French historian (born 1660)
- January 11
  - Pierre Jurieu, French Protestant writer (born 1637)
  - René Massuet, French editor (born 1666)
- February 19 – Dorothe Engelbretsdotter, Norwegian poet (born 1634)
- July 24 – Agnes Campbell, Scottish printer (born 1637)
- September 15 – Andrew Fletcher, Scottish politician and writer (born 1653)
- October 21 – Jakob Gronovius, Dutch scholar (born 1645)
- November 14 – Gottfried Leibniz, German mathematician and philosopher (born 1646)
- December 31 – William Wycherley, English dramatist (born 1641)
- probable year - Patrick Abercromby, Scottish antiquary and translator (born 1656)
