= Thomas James Mathias =

British satirist and scholar

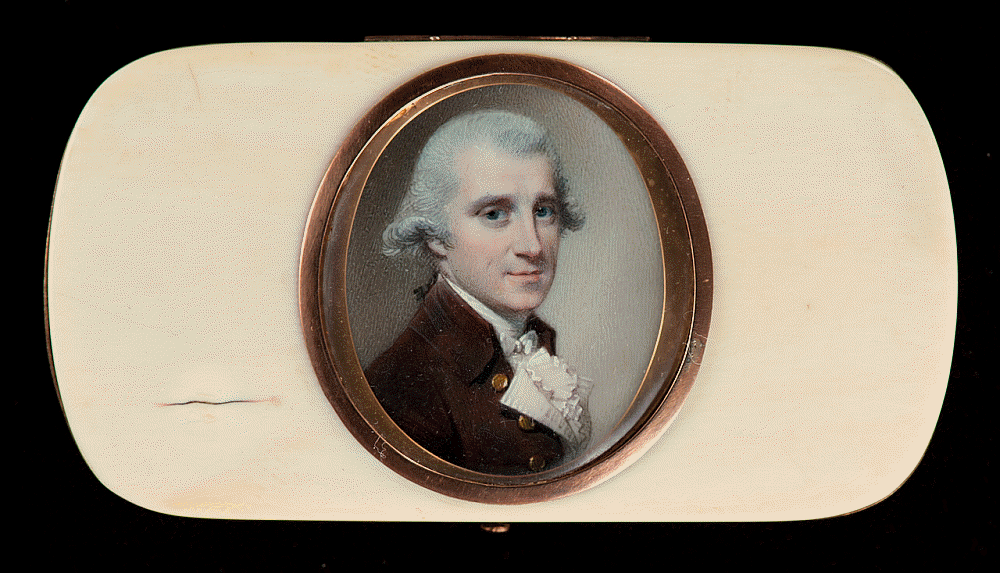

Thomas James Mathias, FRS (c.1754 – August 1835) was a British satirist and scholar.

== Life ==
Mathias was educated in Kingston upon Thames and Trinity College, Cambridge. He held some minor appointments in the royal household (sub-treasurer, 1782 and treasurer). His first publication was Runic Odes, imitated from the Norse Tongue, in the manner of Thomas Gray, London, 4to, 1781. In 1783 he published, An Essay on the Evidence, external and internal, relating to the Poems attributed to Thomas Rowley. In 1794 appeared the first part of an anonymous poem, entitled, The Pursuits of Literature, which, when completed in four parts, attracted universal attention, chiefly on account of the notes, which abound in deep and discriminating criticism on public men and opinions. Besides several minor pieces of his own, he published the Works of Thomas Gray, with his Life, and Additions, Cambridge, 1814, 2 vols., 4to. In 1817 he settled in Italy and took up his residence at Naples, where he died in 1835. He was a member of the Academy of Arcadia under the name of Larisio Salaminio.

Mathias became a vegetarian after reading Mandeville's The Fable of the Bees. He gave up all meat and lived on a diet of milk and vegetables.

== Works ==
He was an accomplished Italian scholar, and translated various English works into Italian, such as Canzoni e prose toscane, and vice versa. He also produced a fine edition of the work of Thomas Gray, on which he lost heavily. His chief work was The Pursuits of Literature (1794), an undiscriminating satire on his literary contemporaries that went through 16 editions, but is now almost forgotten. More so was his uncompromising criticism of the times. An example:

Here is another little capriccio of a man of no common sagacity, the late Adam Smith. He says seriously, by way of illustration; “No body ever saw a dog make a fair and deliberate exchange of one bone for another with another dog." Smith's Wealth of Nations, Vol. 1, p. 20. Ed. 8vo. This philosophy is nearly of the same date as Adam's ancestor in Eden, and I can only say in reply, "Who ever expected to see a dog do so?"—We have all heard and read of that snarling sect the Cynics, and if we could convert dogs into philosophers, or what is harder still, philosophical propositions into meat and bones, (which I fear is more than most Scotch Professors can do) I should apply metaphorically the following lines from a celebrated Poet, a great observer of human nature:

“So when two dogs are fighting in the streets,
With a third dog one of the two dogs meets;
With angry tooth he bites him to the bone,
And this dog smarts for what that dog has done.”

== Selected publications ==
- The Pursuits of Literature (1798 edition)
