= Hont =

Hont may refer to:

== Places ==
- Hont County (archaically Honth), a historic administrative county of the Kingdom of Hungary, now in southern Slovakia and northern Hungary
- Hont, Hungary, a village in Hungary

== People with the surname ==
- István Hont (1947–2013), Hungarian-born British historian

== Other uses ==
- Hont (Dutch unit), an historical Dutch unit of area
- Hont-Pázmány, a gens (clan) in the Kingdom of Hungary
