= Consumer revolution =

Period between 1600 and 1750 in England

The consumer revolution refers to the period from approximately 1600 to 1750 in England in which there was a marked increase in the consumption and variety of luxury goods and products by individuals from different economic and social backgrounds. The consumer revolution marked a departure from the traditional mode of life that was dominated by frugality and scarcity to one of increasingly mass consumption in society.

== History ==
Consumerism has weak links with the Western world, but is in fact an international phenomenon. People purchasing goods and consuming materials in excess of their basic needs is as old as the first civilizations (e.g. Ancient Egypt, Babylon and Ancient Rome).

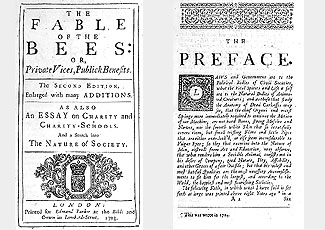
Bernard Mandeville's work The Fable of the Bees, which justified conspicuous consumption

The consumer society emerged in the late seventeenth century and intensified throughout the eighteenth century, mainly due to trade deals with their extensive colonies across 4 continents. Change was propelled by the growing middle-class who embraced new ideas about luxury consumption and the growing importance of fashion as an arbiter for purchasing rather than necessity. This revolution encompassed the growth in construction of vast country estates specifically designed to cater for comfort and the increased availability of luxury goods aimed at a growing market. This included sugar, tobacco, tea and coffee; these were increasingly grown on vast slave plantations in Caribbean colonies as demand steadily rose. In particular, sugar consumption in Britain during the course of the 18th century increased by a factor of 20. Moreover, the expansion of trade and markets also contributed to the burgeoning consumer revolution, by increasing the variety of goods that could be made available to affluent society.

This pattern was particularly visible in London where the gentry and prosperous merchants took up residence and created a culture of luxury and consumption that was slowly extended across the socio-economic divide. Marketplaces expanded as shopping centres, such as the New Exchange, opened in 1609 by Robert Cecil in the Strand. Shops started to become important as places for Londoners to meet and socialise and became popular destinations alongside the theatre. Restoration London also saw the growth of luxury buildings as advertisements for social position with speculative architects like Nicholas Barbon and Lionel Cranfield.

There was growth in industries like glass making and silk manufacturing, and much pamphleteering of the time was devoted to justifying private vice for luxury goods for the greater public good. This then scandalous line of thought caused great controversy with the publication of Bernard Mandeville's influential work The Fable of the Bees in 1714, in which he argued that a country's prosperity ultimately lay in the self-interest of the consumer.

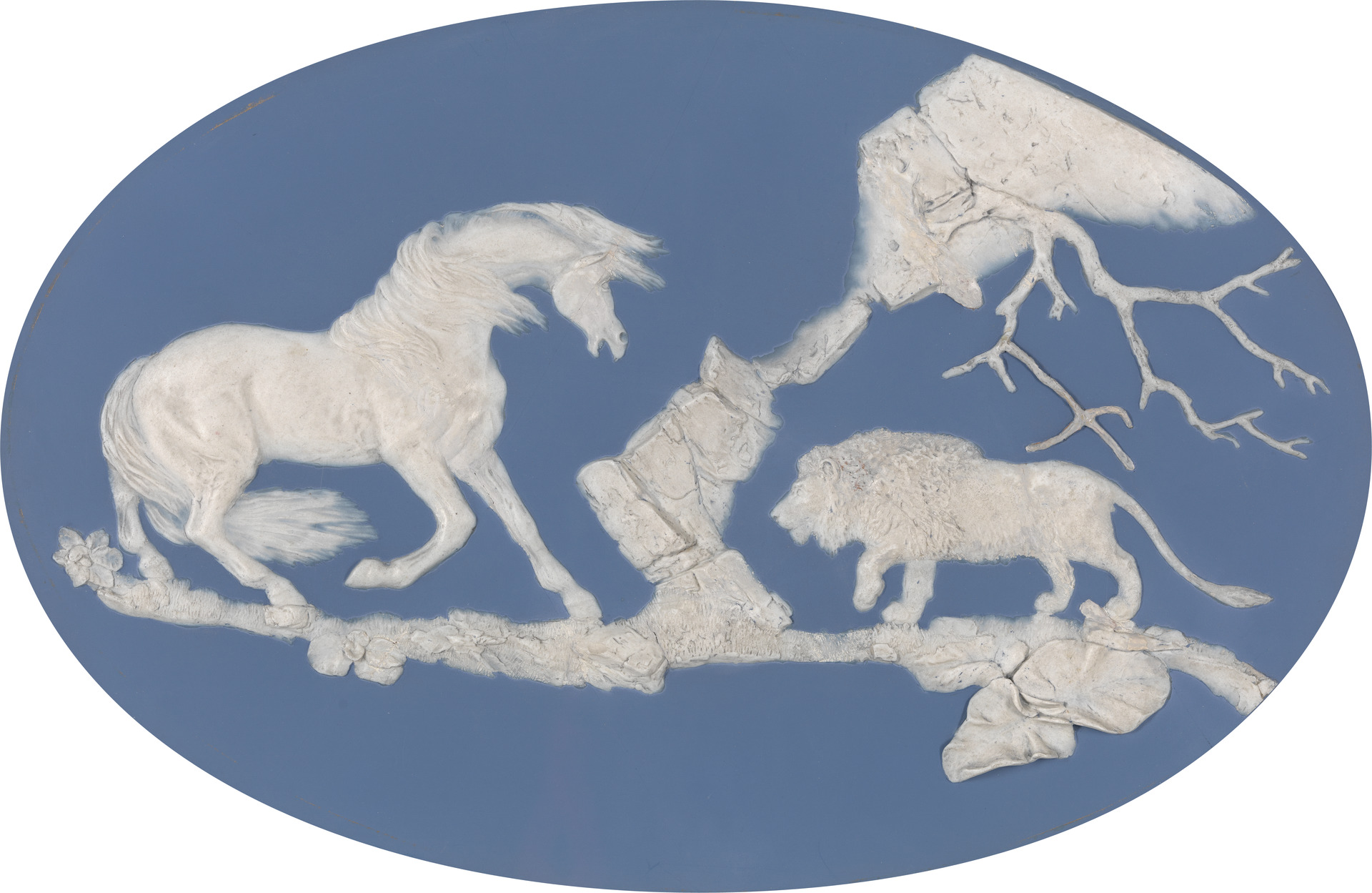
Wedgwood pottery, featuring Horse Frightened by a Lion motif from George Stubbs, 1780

These trends were vastly accelerated in the 18th century, as rising prosperity and social mobility increased the number of people with disposable income for consumption. Important shifts included the marketing of goods for individuals as opposed to items for the household, and the new status of goods as status symbols, related to changes in fashion and desired for aesthetic appeal, as opposed to just their utility.

The pottery inventor and entrepreneur, Josiah Wedgwood, noticed the way aristocratic fashions, themselves subject to periodic changes in direction, slowly filtered down through society. He pioneered the use of marketing techniques to influence and manipulate the direction of the prevailing tastes and preferences to cause his goods to be accepted among the aristocracy; it was only a matter of time before his goods were being rapidly bought up by the middle classes as well. His example was followed by other producers of a wide range of products and the spread and importance of consumption fashions became steadily more important.

== Semi-luxury and imitation ==
Popular culture drew aesthetic techniques, design, and technology from the goods England gathered from trade in Asia and the Mediterranean. With the increased demand for Asian ceramics, European markets had difficulty supplying buyers so inventors started imitating Chinese porcelain. Porcelain remained popular for tableware and pottery, but the style, shape and decoration of the porcelain changed to fit more Western tastes, painting flowers and English scenes rather than Chinese ones.

Imitation goods were also used to disguise social class. Middle-class consumers could not afford the same exotic luxury goods brought back from overseas trade that the elite class used to distinguish their elevated rank. Markets and shops whose target buyers were middle-class consumers began creating "semi-luxury" goods that imitated actual luxury goods. These goods were part of a movement to create a "counterfeit culture" that gave middle-class consumers an opportunity to emulate the wealth and luxurious life that the elite class lived without paying as much. Household decorations, kitchenware, clothes, and transportation vehicles were all objects that could be used to crossover into "polite society."

England was concerned with the quantity products exported out of England in comparison to the countries they traded with. England did not want to be overcome economically by countries in Asia because they did not export as much so merchants, artisans, and shopkeepers started creating their own goods to compete with the Asian market. To avoid entirely copying Asian goods, English inventors imitated goods from other countries that also traded with Asia such as France, Holland, Switzerland, and Spain. The goal was not to mimic the exact product, but instead use the techniques that proved successful in other European imitations to create a superior product.

Imitation and semi-luxury goods were also popular because they showed the modernization of English production and manufacturing processes. Large-scale production required standardization, advanced mechanical replication, and an organized system of assembly. Substitutes for the indigenous materials used to create the original products were seen as a show of enlightened and advanced thinking. The imitation and innovation of semi-luxury goods was a testament to the potential the English had to impact the global economy, to be France, China and India in national exports.

== See also ==
- Capitalism
- Commercialism
- Consumer economy
- Conspicuous consumption
- Economic materialism
- Industrial Revolution
- Industrious Revolution

== Bibliography ==
- Fairchilds, Cissie. “Review: Consumption in Early Modern Europe. A Review Article”. Comparative Studies in Society and History, Vol. 35, No. 4. (Oct., 1993), pp. 850–858.
- Roberts, Mary L. 1998. "Gender, Consumption, and Commodity Culture." American Historical Review 103: 817-44
- Berg, Maxine, Clifford, H. (eds.), Consumers and luxury: Consumer culture in Europe 1650-1850, Manchester:Manchester UP 1999
- Berg, Maxine, Luxury & Pleasure in Eighteenth-Century Britain, Oxford: OUP 2005
- Berry, Helen, ‘Polite Consumption: Shopping in Eighteenth-Century England’, TRHS 6thSer. 12, 2002, pp. 375-394
- Cox, Nancy, The complete Tradesman. A Study of Retailing, 1550-1820, Aldershot: Ashgate 2000
- Lemire, Beverley, Fashion’s Favourite: The Cotton Trade and the Consumer in Britain, 1660-1800, Oxford: OUP 1991
- McKendrick, Neil, Brewer, John, Plumb, J.H., The Birth of a Consumer Society: The Commercialization of Eighteenth-century England, London: Europa Publications 1982
- Mui, Hoh-Chueng, Mui, Lorna H., Shops and Shopkeeping in Eighteenth-Century England, Kingston: McGill-Queen's UP 1989
- Shammas, Carole, The Pre-industrial Consumer in England and America, Oxford: Clarendon 1990
- Spufford, Margaret, The Great Reclothing of Rural England: Petty Chapmen and their Wares in the Seventeenth Century, London: Hambledon 1984
- Blondé, Bruno et al. (eds.), Retail circuits and practices in medieval and early modern Europe (Studies in European Urban History (1100-1800) 9), Turnhout: Brepols 2006
- Stobart, Jon ‘Shopping streets as social space: leisure, consumerism and improvement in an eighteenth-century county town’, Urban History 25:1, 1998, pp. 3-21
- Stobart, Jon, Hann, Andrew, ‘Retailing Revolution in the Eighteenth Century? Evidence from North-West England’, Business History 46:2, 2004, pp. 171-194
- Stobart, Jon, ‘Leisure and Shopping in the Small Towns of Georgian England. A Regional Approach’, Journal of Urban History 32:4, 2005, pp. 479-503
- Stobart, Jon, Hann, Andrew, Morgan, Victoria, Spaces of Consumption. Leisure and shopping in the English town, c. 1680-1830, London: Routledge 2007
- Stobart, Jon, Spend, Spend, Spend! A History of Shopping, Stroud/Gloucs: History Press 2008
- Stobart, Jon, ‘Gentlemen and shopkeepers: supplying the country house in eighteenth-century England’, Economic History Review 64:3, 2011, pp. 885-904
- de Vries, Jan, The Industrious Revolution: Consumer Behavior and the Household Economy, 1650 to the Present, Cambridge: CUP 2008
- Wallis, Patrick, ‘Consumption, retailing and medicine in early-modern London’, Economic History Review 61:1, 2008, pp. 6-53
- Walsh, Claire, ‘Shop Design and the Display of Goods in Eighteenth-Century London’, Journal of Design History 8:3, 1995, pp. 157-176
- Walsh, Claire, ‘The design of London goldsmiths’ shops in the early eighteenth century’, in: David Mitchell, ed., Goldsmiths, Silversmiths and Bankers: Innovation and the Transfer of Skill, 1550 to 1750 (Centre for Metropolitan History Working Papers Series 2), Stroud/Gloucs, 1995, pp. 96-111
- Walsh, Claire, ‘Social Meaning and Social Space in the Shopping Galleries of Early Modern London’, in: John Benson, Laura Ugolini, (eds.), A Nation of Shopkeepers: Five Centuries of British Retailing, London: I.B. Tauris, 2003, pp. 52-79
