= High Street =

Generic primary business street of towns or cities

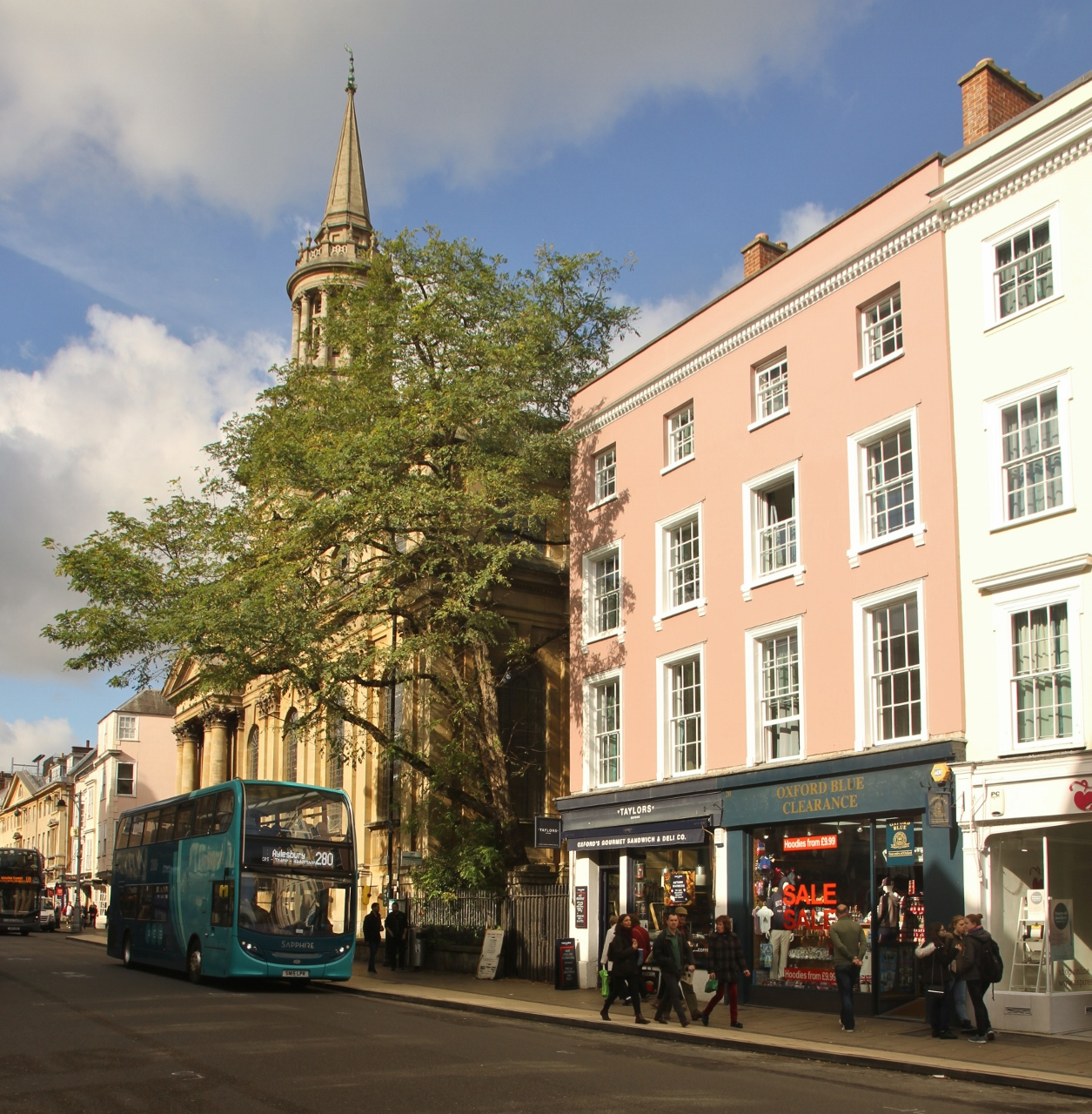
High Street in Oxford, England

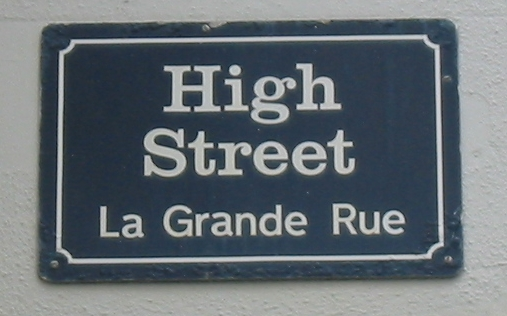
High Street sign in English and French, St Peter Port, Guernsey

High Street is a common street name for the primary business street of a city, town, or village, especially in the United Kingdom and Commonwealth. It implies that it is the focal point for business, especially shopping. It is also a metonym for the retail sector. While many streets, such as Camden High Street (in London), bear this name, streets with similar function but different names are often referred to as "high street".

With the rapid increase in consumer expenditure, the number of High Streets in England grew from the 17th century and reached a peak in Victorian Britain, where, drawn to growing towns and cities spurred on by the Industrial Revolution, the rate of urbanisation was unprecedented. Since the latter half of the 20th century, the prosperity of High Streets has been in decline due to the growth of out-of-town shopping centres, and, since the early 21st century, the growth of online retailing, forcing many shop closures and prompting the UK government to consider initiatives to reinvigorate and preserve the High Street.

High Street is the most common street name in the UK, which according to a 2009 statistical compilation has 5,410 High Streets, 3,811 Station Roads and 2,702 Main Streets.

== Definition and usage ==
In Middle English the word "high" denoted superior rank ("high sheriff", "Lord High Chancellor", "high society"). "High" also applied to roads as they improved: "highway" was a new term taken up by the church and their vestries during the 17th century as a term for all public roads between settlements. From the 19th century, which saw a proliferation in the number of public roads, the term "highway" lost its specific meaning, and was legally defined as any public road (e.g., the Highway Code regulates UK public roads). The term "high street" assumed a different meaning, that of a street where the most important shops and businesses were located.

In Britain, the term 'high street' has both a generic and a specific meaning: people refer to 'shopping on the high street' both when they mean the main retail area, as well as the specific street of that name. Many former British colonies, including Canada, Australia, New Zealand, and the US region known as New England (especially Massachusetts), adopted the term to refer to retail shopping areas. In other parts of the Northeastern United States, the town's main retail street may still be a street named High Street (such as in Columbus, Ohio), but the term is seldom used to refer more generally to a retail street or district. Main street is used in the island of Ireland.

== Incidence ==
In Britain, some 3,000 streets called High Street and about 2,300 streets with variations on the name (such as Upper High Street, High Street West) have been identified, giving a grand total of approximately 5,300. Of these, more than 600 High Streets are located in London's boroughs.

Main Street is a term used in smaller towns and villages in Scotland, while in North East England Front Street is common. In Cornwall, some places in Devon and some places in the North of England, the equivalent is Fore Street; in some parts of the UK Market Street is also used, although sometimes this may be a different area where street markets are currently (or were historically) held.

== History ==
Following the Great Fire of London (1666), the city of London was completely rebuilt. New planning laws, governing rebuilding, designated four types of street based on the size of their carriageways and the types of buildings. Shops were permitted in the principal street or 'high street', but not in the by-lanes or back streets. This may have been based on the need for high visibility in order to regulate retail trade, as well as to avoid congestion in the narrow lanes and back streets. Accordingly, from the 17th century, the term "High Street" gradually assumed a narrower meaning and came to describe thoroughfares with significant retail in large villages and towns.

With the rapid increase in consumer expenditure, in the late 17th and 18th centuries the number of High Streets in England increased markedly. Britain also saw an unprecedented growth in urbanisation with people flocking to growing towns and cities. Nurtured by the Industrial Revolution, the department store became a common feature in major High Streets across Britain, with Harding, Howell & Co., opened in 1796 on Pall Mall, London, a contender for the first department store. Founded in London in 1792, bookseller and stationers WHSmith is the world's oldest national retail chain. The 19th century was a "golden era" for High Street shops. The rise of the middle class in Victorian England contributed to a more favourable attitude to shopping and consumption. Shopping centres became places to see and be seen, for recreational shopping, and for promenading. By the 20th century, however, the viability of High Streets began to decline.

=== Postwar ===
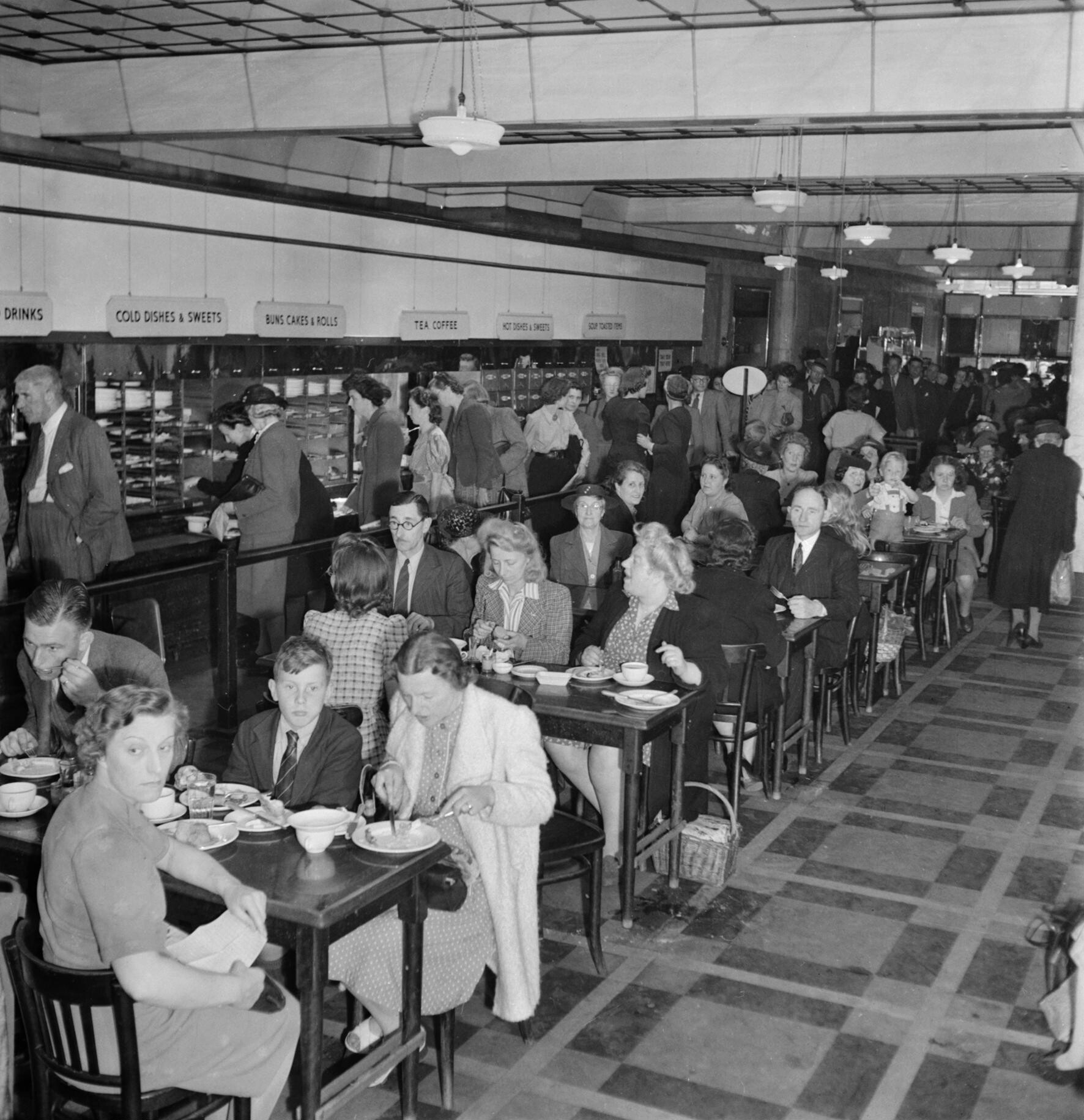
Lyons' teashop in Reading, 1945, serving tea/coffee with a choice of snacks (including cake). With over 200 branches, the chain was a staple of the High Street in the UK.

In the second half of the 20th century, traditional British High Street precincts came under pressure from out-of-town shopping centres in the United Kingdom, with the balance shifting towards the latter. In the early 21st century, bricks and mortar retailers confronted another major threat from online retailers operating in a global marketplace. To confront this threat, High Street precincts have been forced to evolve; some have become smaller as shops shut their doors, while others have become more like social spaces with a concentration of retail services including cafes, restaurants and entertainment venues while yet others have positioned themselves as more up-market shopping precincts with a preponderance of stores selling luxury branded goods.

In the United Kingdom, geographic concentration of goods and services (including at industrial estates and out of town shopping centres) has reduced the share of the economy contributed to by workers in the high street. High Street refers to only a part of commerce. The town centre in many British towns combines a group of outdoor shopping streets (one or more of which may be pedestrianised), with an adjacent indoor shopping centre.

High Streets through the centuries

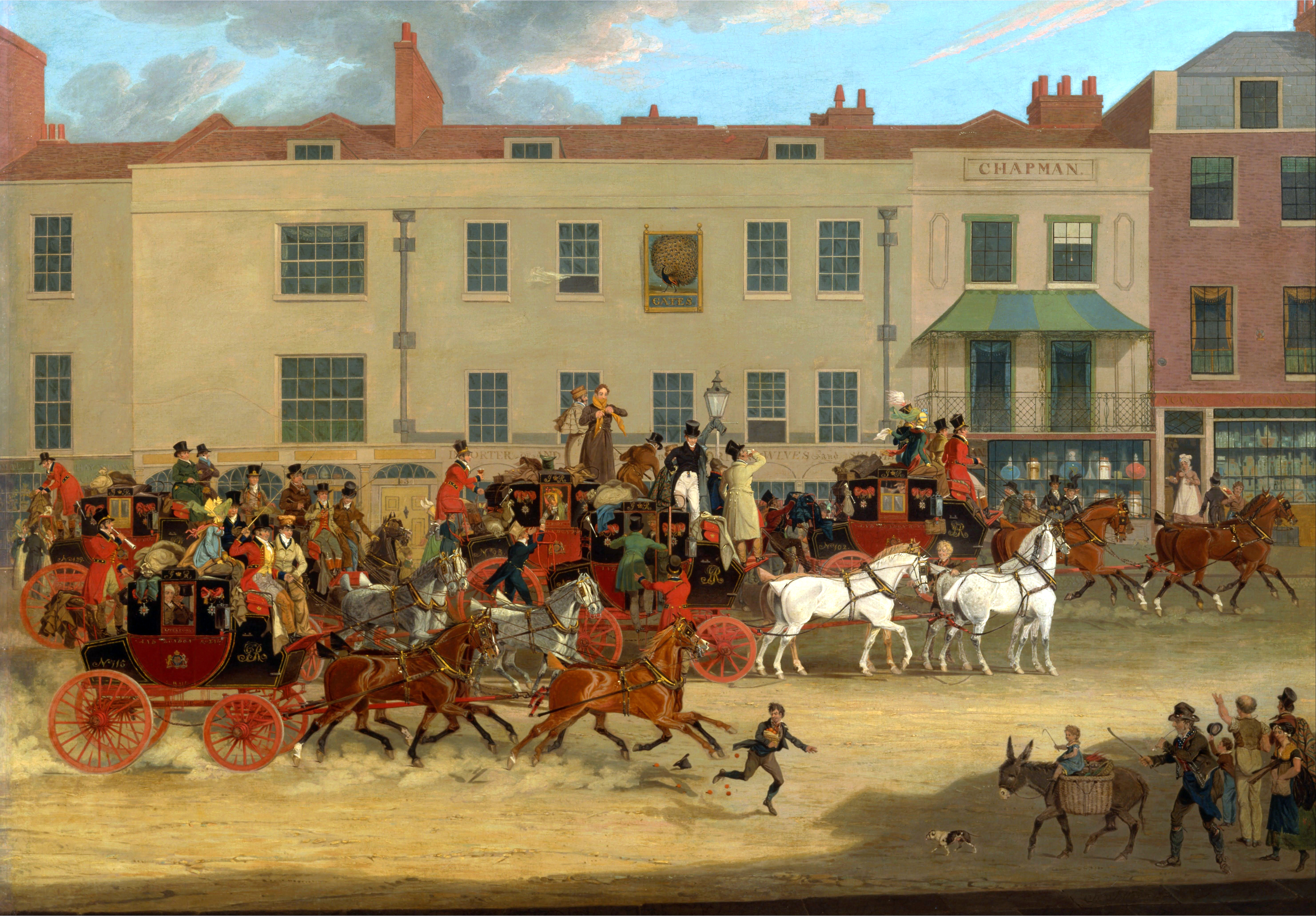
The Peacock Inn, High Street, Islington, c. 1800

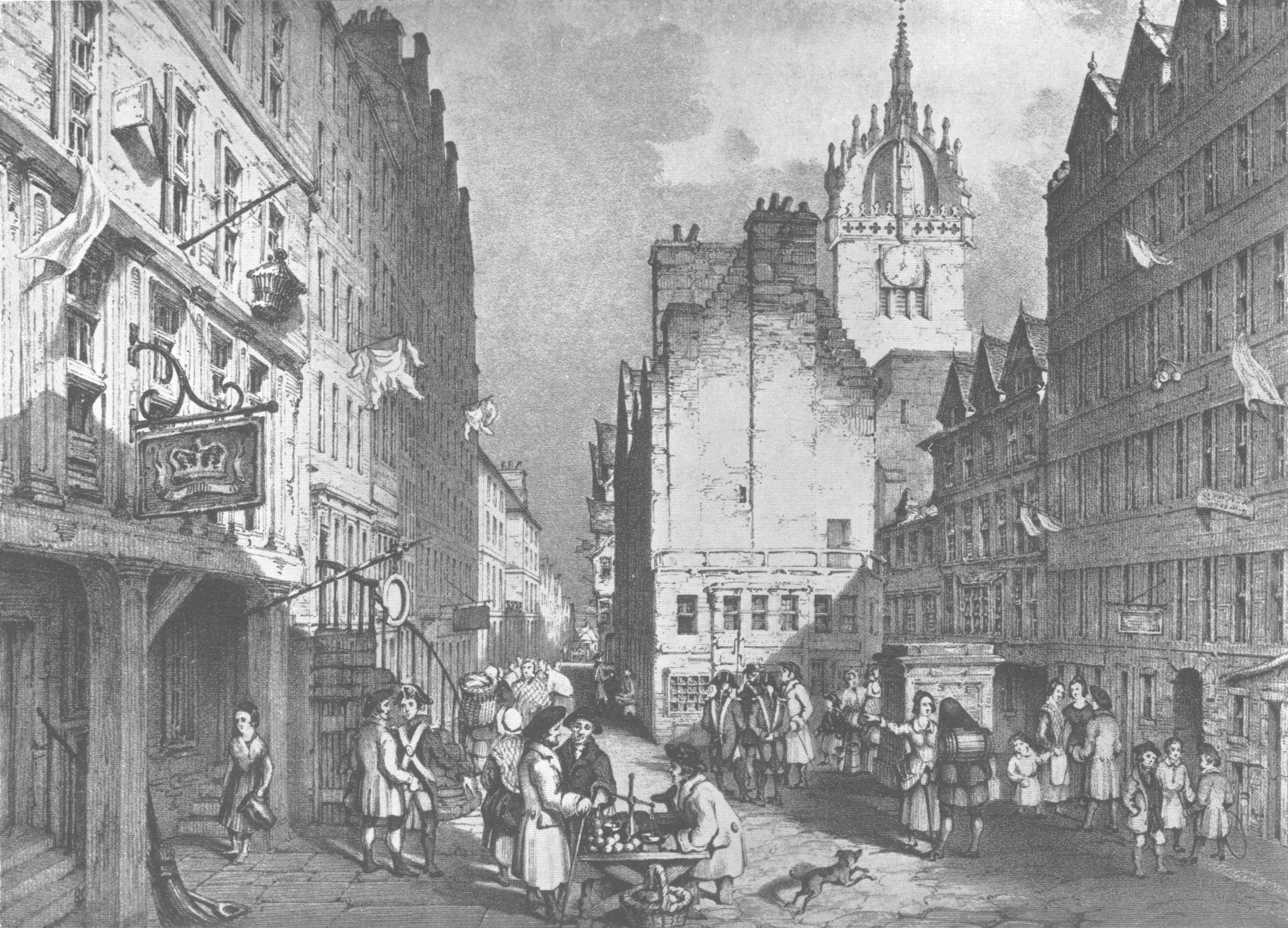
High Street, Edinburgh in the 18th century

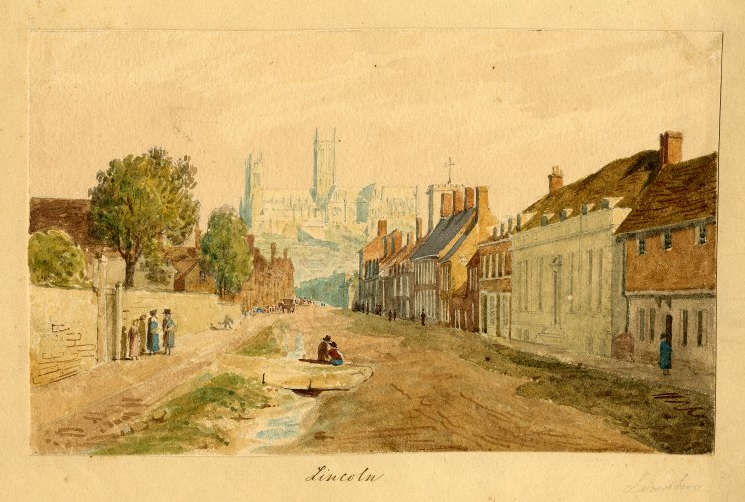
Lincoln High Street, c. 1820

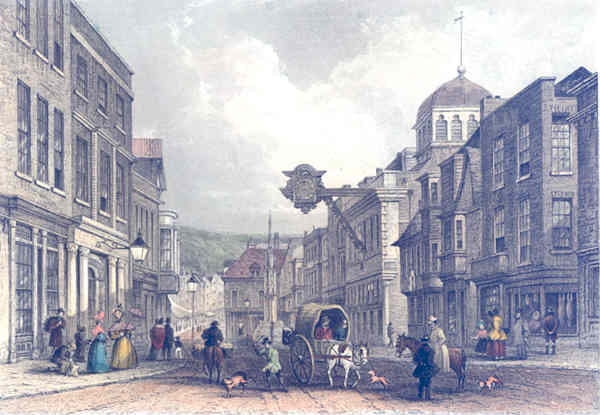
Winchester High Street, 1853

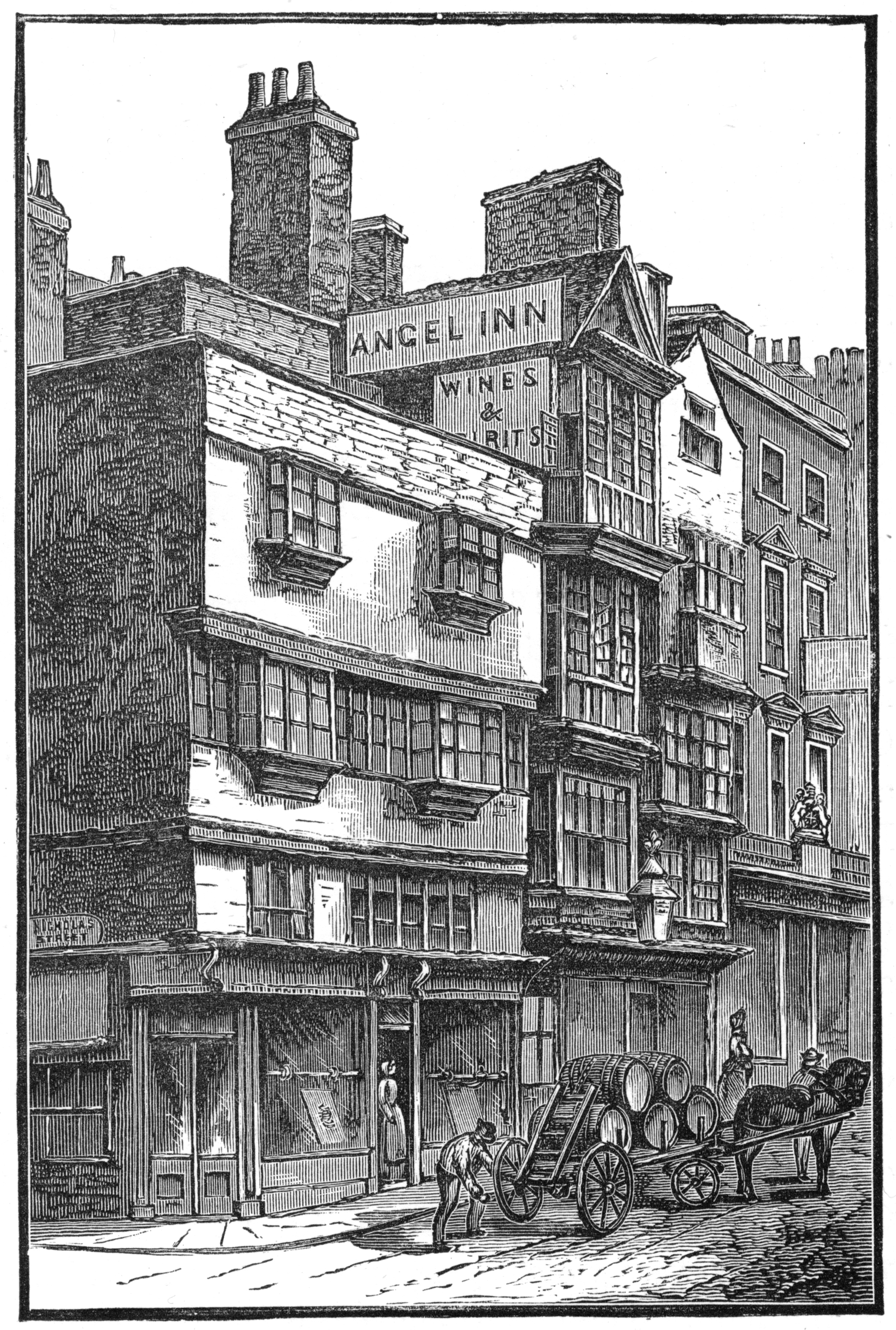
Angel Inn on High Street, 1882

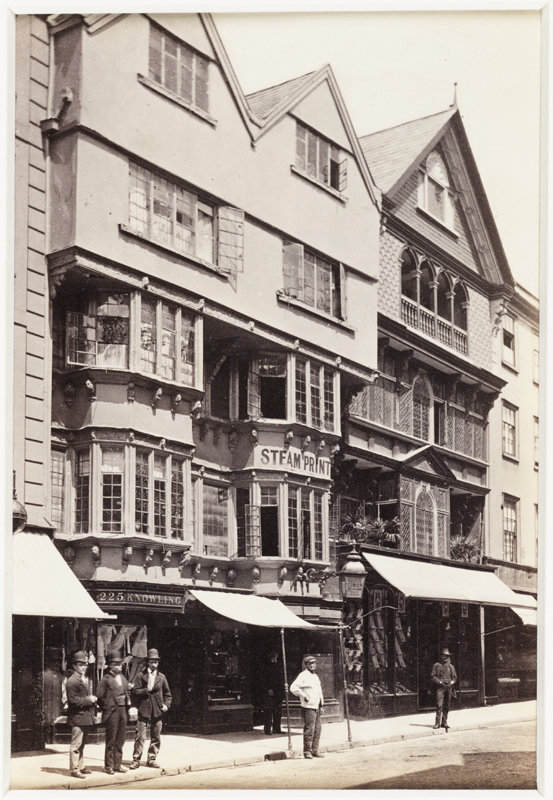
Houses in High Street, 1888

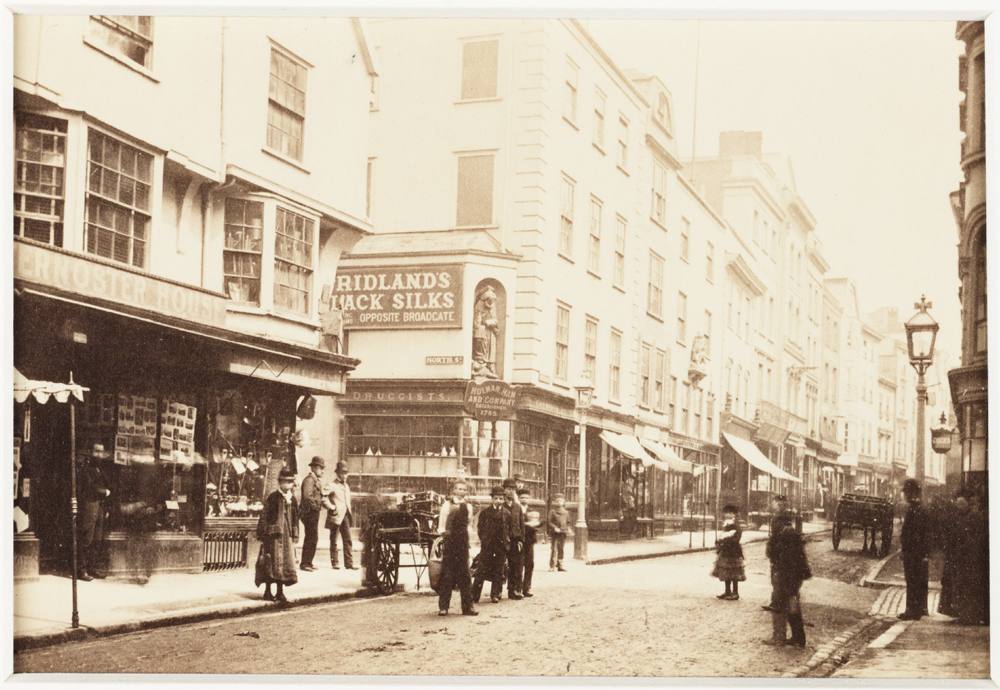
Corner of High Street, 1888

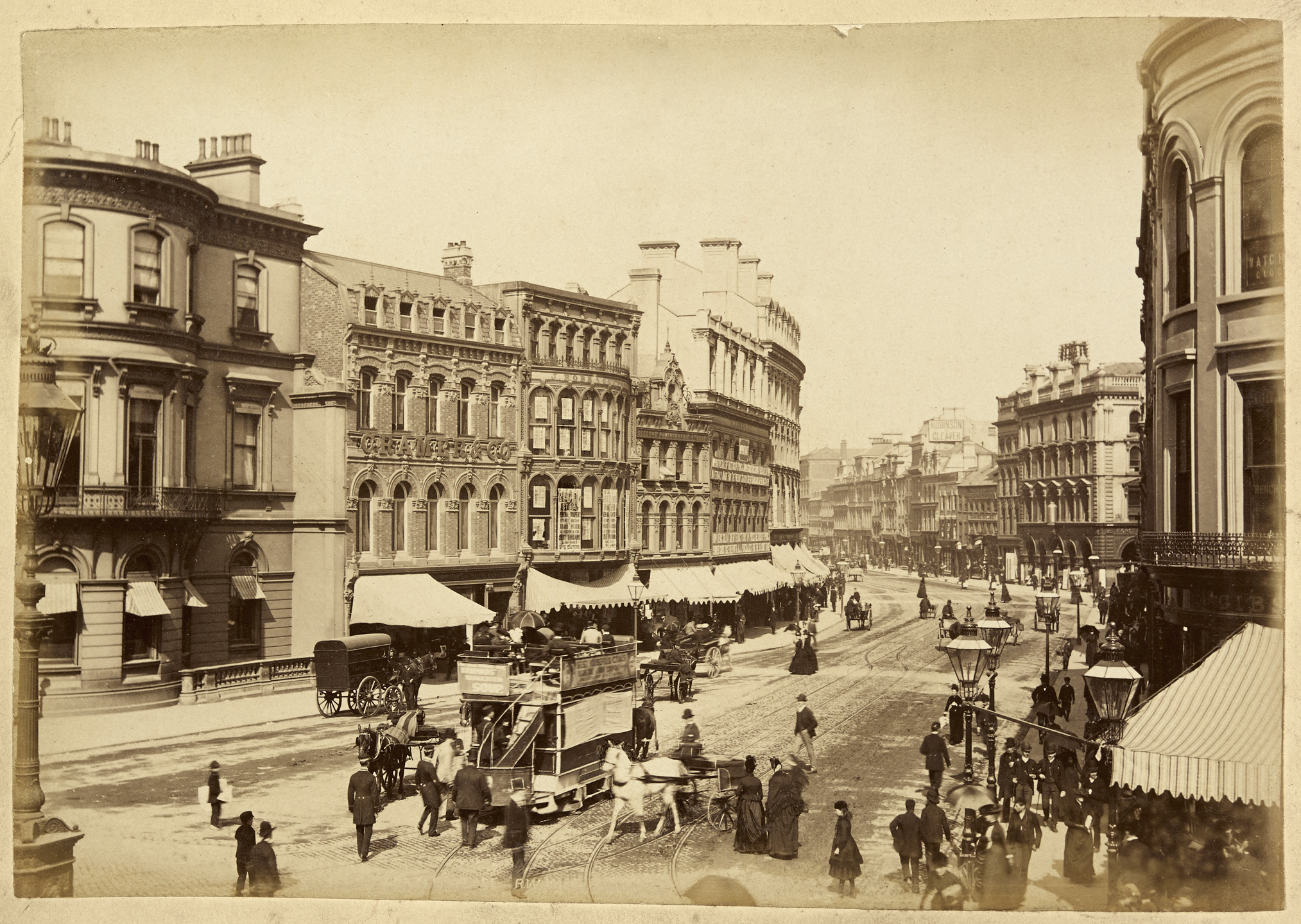
High Street, Belfast, 1888

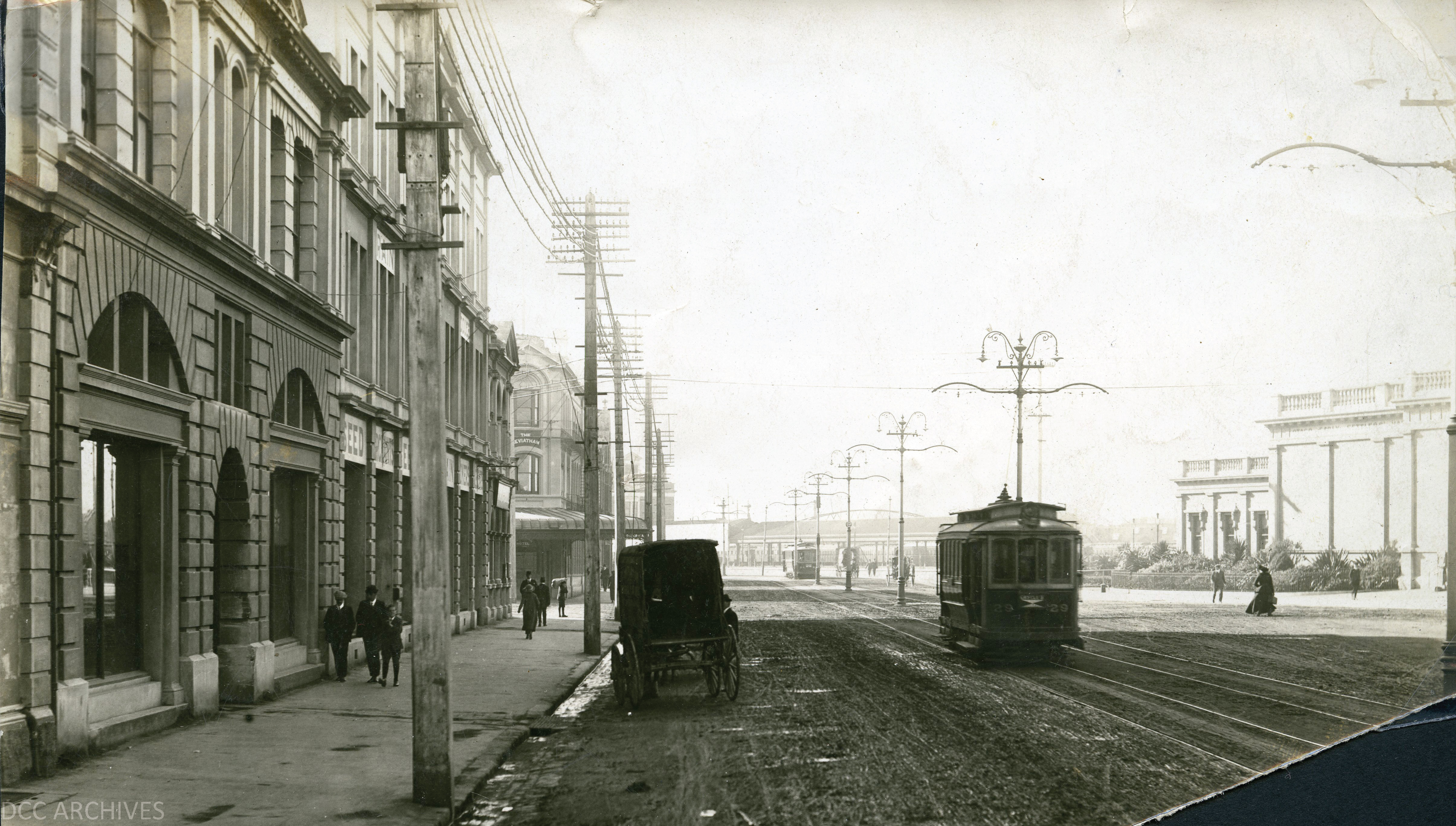
High Street, Dunedin, 1914

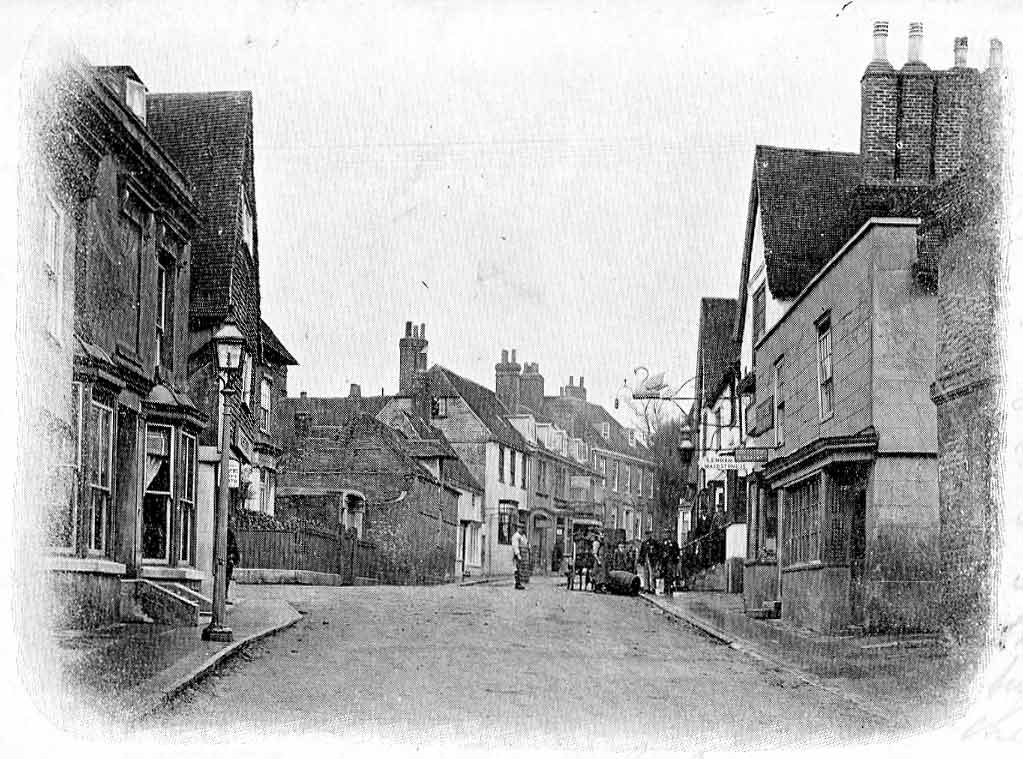
High Street, Charing, Kent, 1905

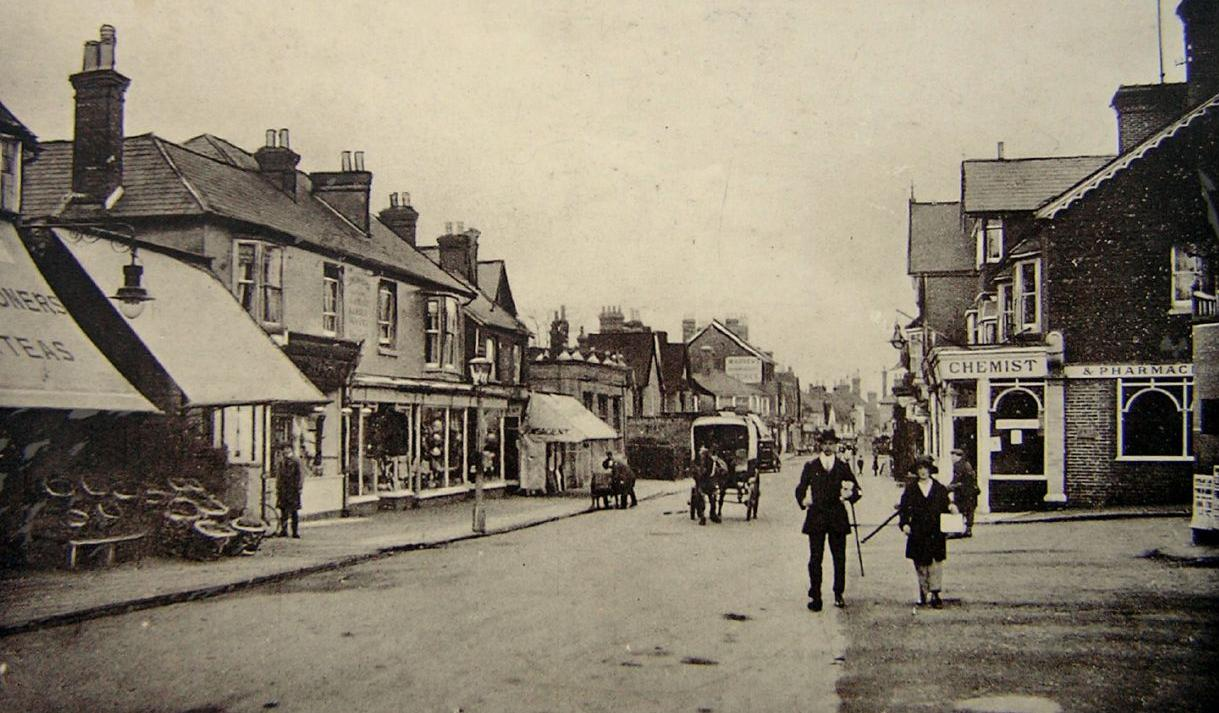
Crawley High Street, 1922

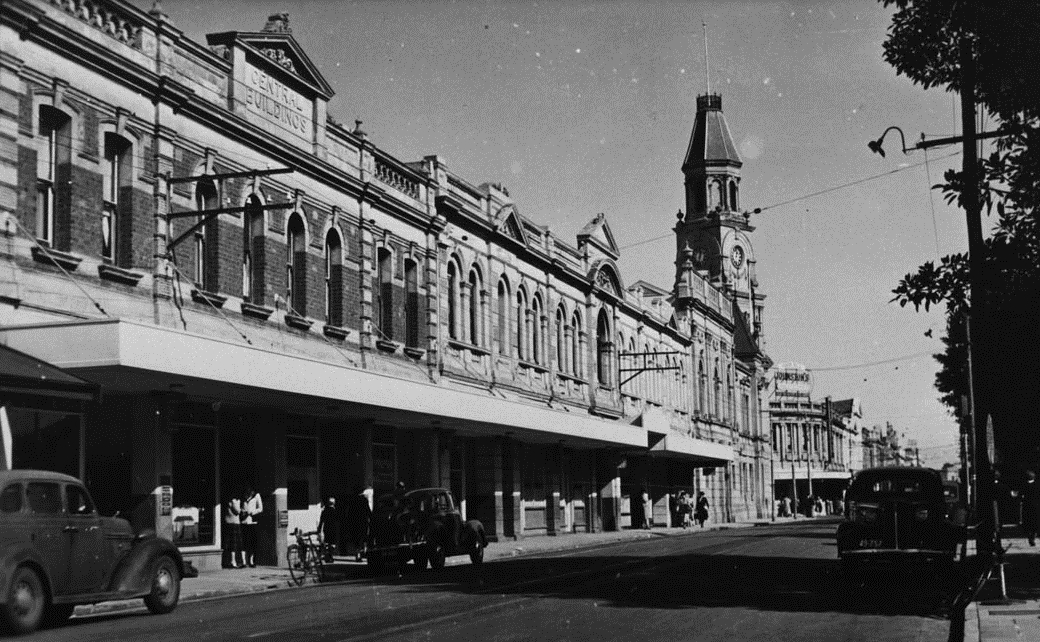
High Street, Fremantle, c. 1940

== Trends ==
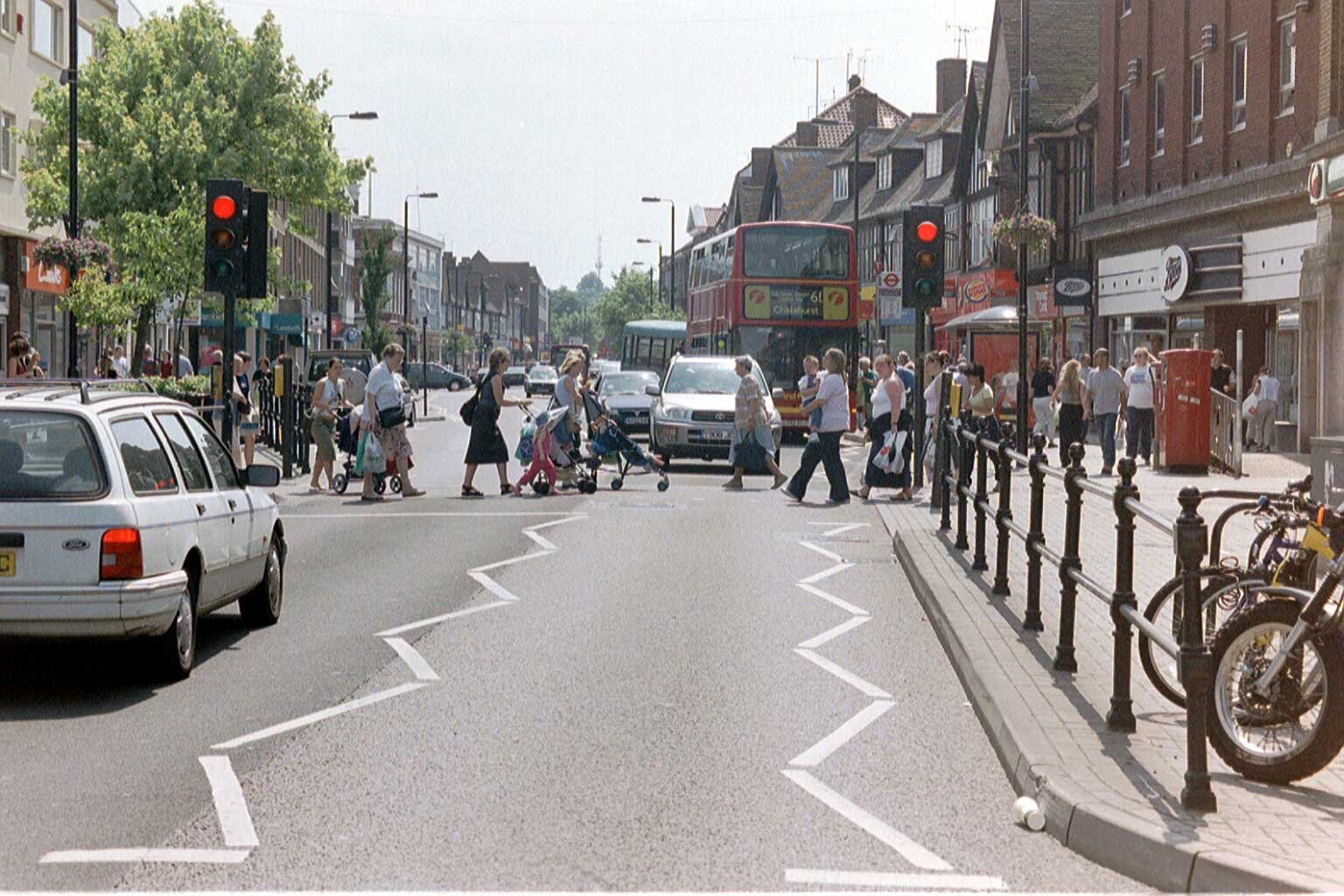
Orpington High Street, London, England

The popularity of shopping malls in the mid-20th century, combined with the rise of online retail at the turn of the century has threatened the viability of high street retail precincts.

Initiatives to preserve the traditional British High Street are evident. Research into the customer's shopping preferences and patterns reveals that the continued vitality of towns is predicated on a number of different variables. Research has highlighted the ongoing challenges faced by towns and cities and suggested that "[t]he town centre serves not only social, utilitarian or hedonic shopping purposes but also supports out-of-hours entertainment and leisure services. The way that consumers perceive and use town centres has also fundamentally changed." In order to address the issues threatening the sustainability of towns it is increasingly important to consider Consumer behaviour and customer experience. This is in line with research that proposes that for high street retail to thrive in spite of the growth threat of eCommerce, the sensual hedonic experiences (e.g. scent, feel, etc.) need to be presented to visitors while allowing for discovery of hidden experiences in the built environment.

=== Small shop preservationist movement ===
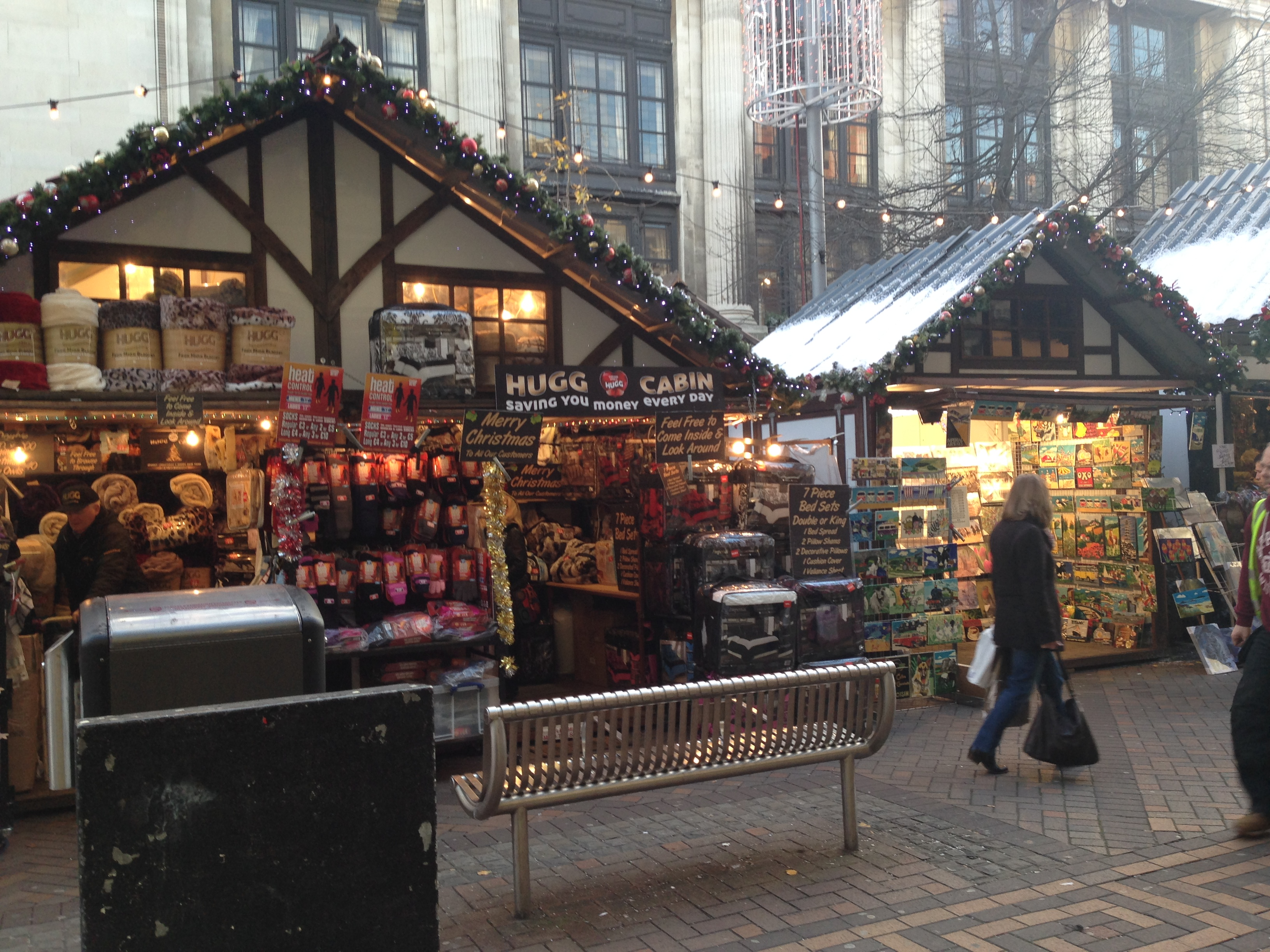
Christmas shopping in Nottingham City Centre in 2016

In 2006, a House of Commons committee concluded that the loss of small shops on high streets in favor of chain stores contributes to the formation of clone towns, leading to "a loss of sociability".

=== The Portas Review ===
In 2011, business consultant Mary Portas, best known for the TV series Mary Queen of Shops, was commissioned by the UK government to provide an independent review of High Street shopping. The report provided evidence for the decline of High Street precincts such as data indicating that retail spending in High Street shops had fallen to below 50 per cent. Her final report set out a vision for High Streets and a number of recommendations. However, her plan has failed to stem the number of High Street store closures, leaving authorities in a quandary about how to proceed.

== Comparative usage ==
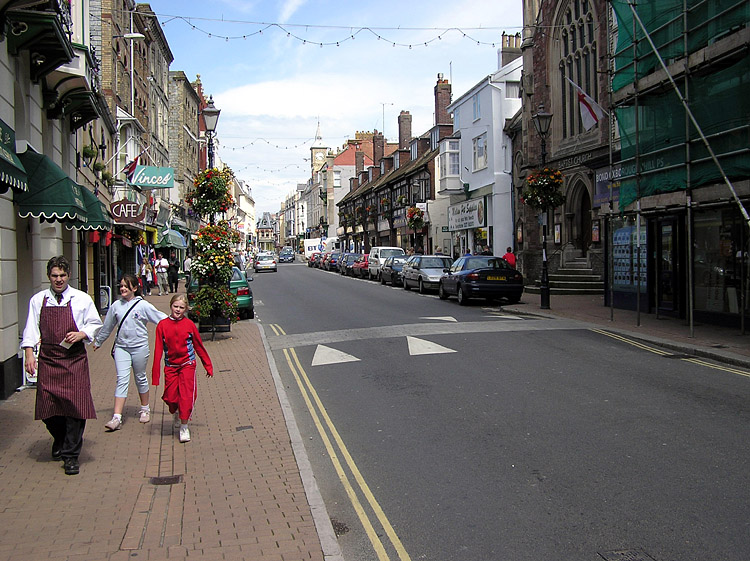
Ilfracombe High Street, Devon, England

The term "High Street" is used to describe stores found on a typical high street to differentiate them from more specialised, exclusive and expensive outlets (often independent stores) – for example, "High Street banks" (instead of the less-common private or investment banks) or "High Street shops" (instead of boutiques).

The phrase "High Street banks" is used to refer to the retail banking sector in the United Kingdom.

== International equivalents ==
=== Australia ===
Alongside High Street, the term Main Street is also used in smaller towns and villages.

=== Belgium and the Netherlands ===
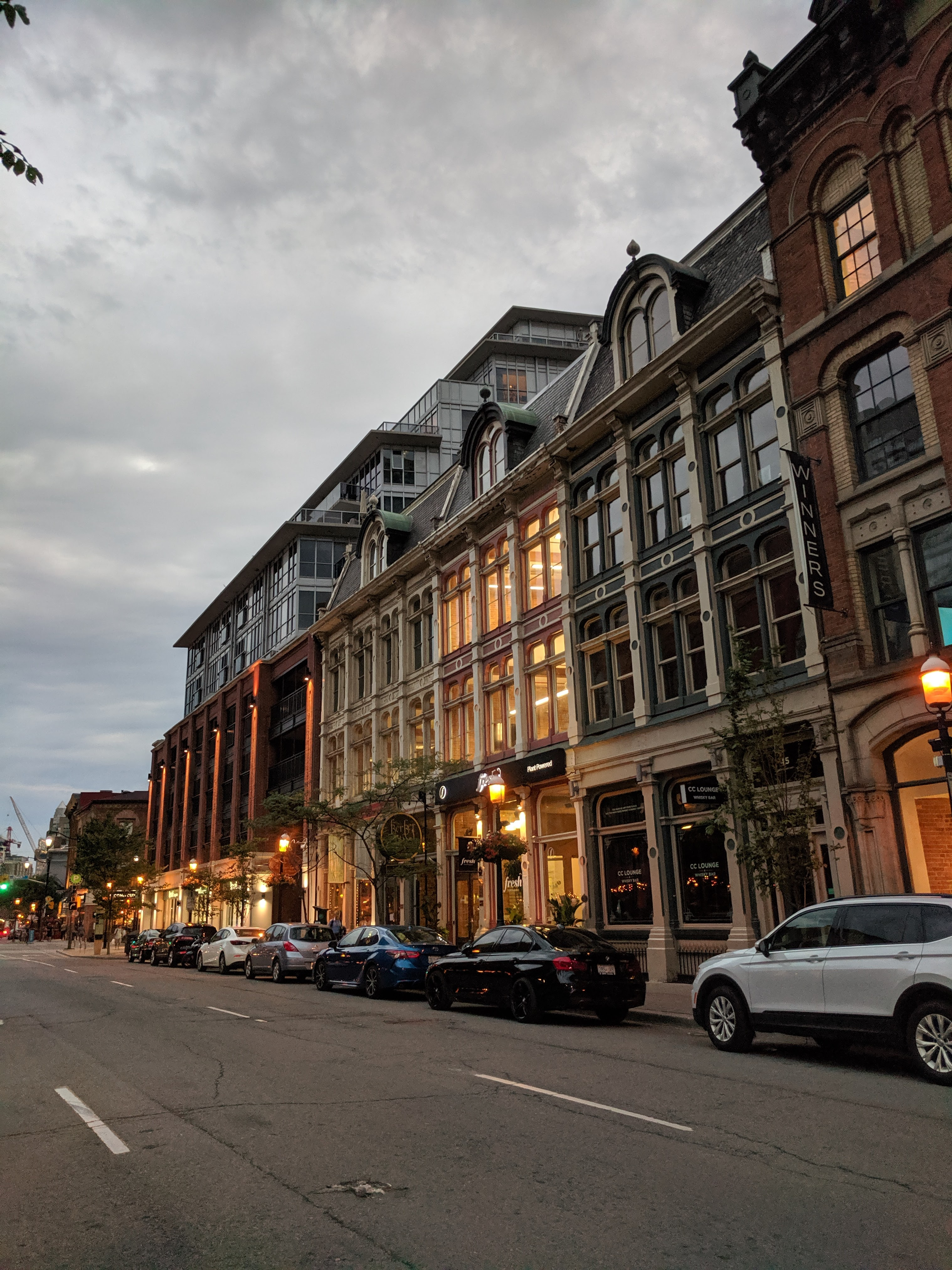
Front Street, Toronto, Canada

The Dutch equivalent is Hoogstraat, or in villages Dorpsstraat ("village street').

=== Canada ===
Alongside the term High Street, the terms Main Street or "Central Avenue" are also used. In Canada, east of Lake Superior, King Street and Queen Street are often major streets; rue Principale, as the literal French language equivalent of Main Street is frequently used in Quebec towns, and "a village where the main street is still Main Street" is a phrase that is used in respect for small towns. In some sections of Canada, the main commercial district is Front Street (especially in cities located alongside a waterway).

=== Germany ===
In Germany, the equivalent is Hauptstraße (Main Street), though this can also refer to a road with a lot of traffic (i.e., a highway). In most cities the main business and shopping area is rather referred to as Innenstadt (downtown) or by the specific street name. In Cologne the Hohe Straße (literally, High Street) is the main shopping street, but was named after a gate at its southern end (the Hohe Pforte, or High Gate).

=== Ireland ===
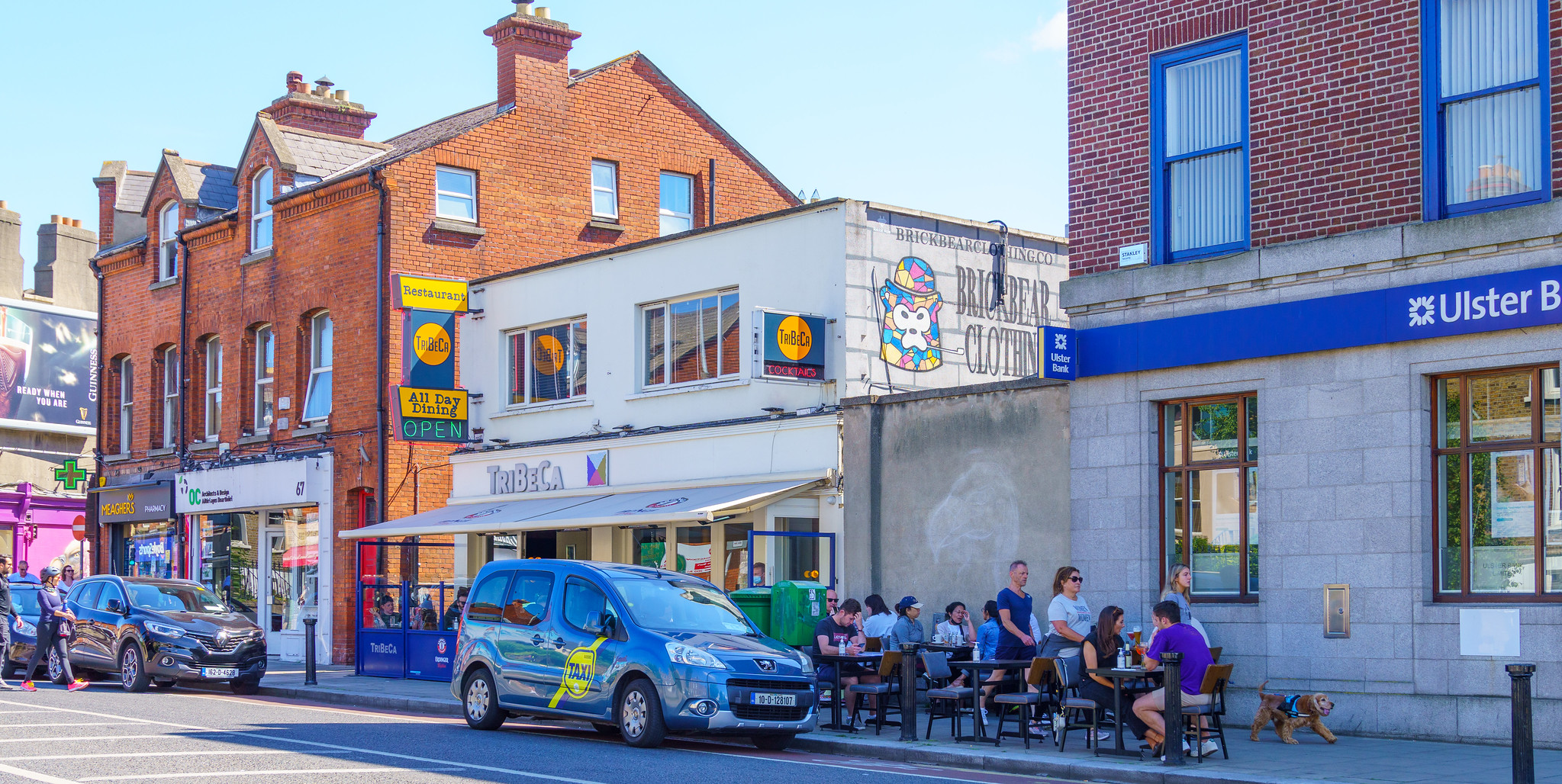
Ranelagh Main Street, Dublin D06

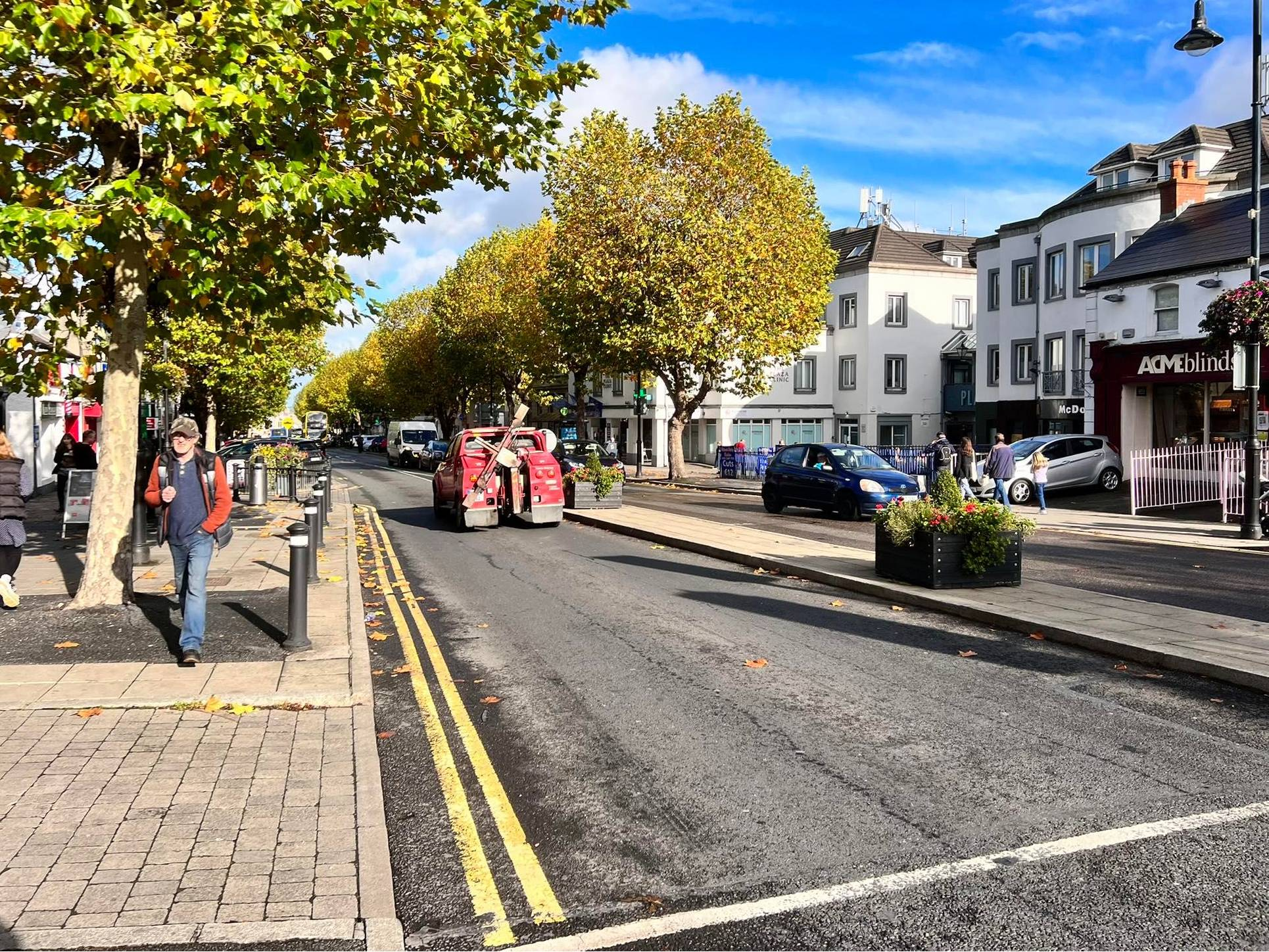
Main Street in the Dublin suburb of Swords

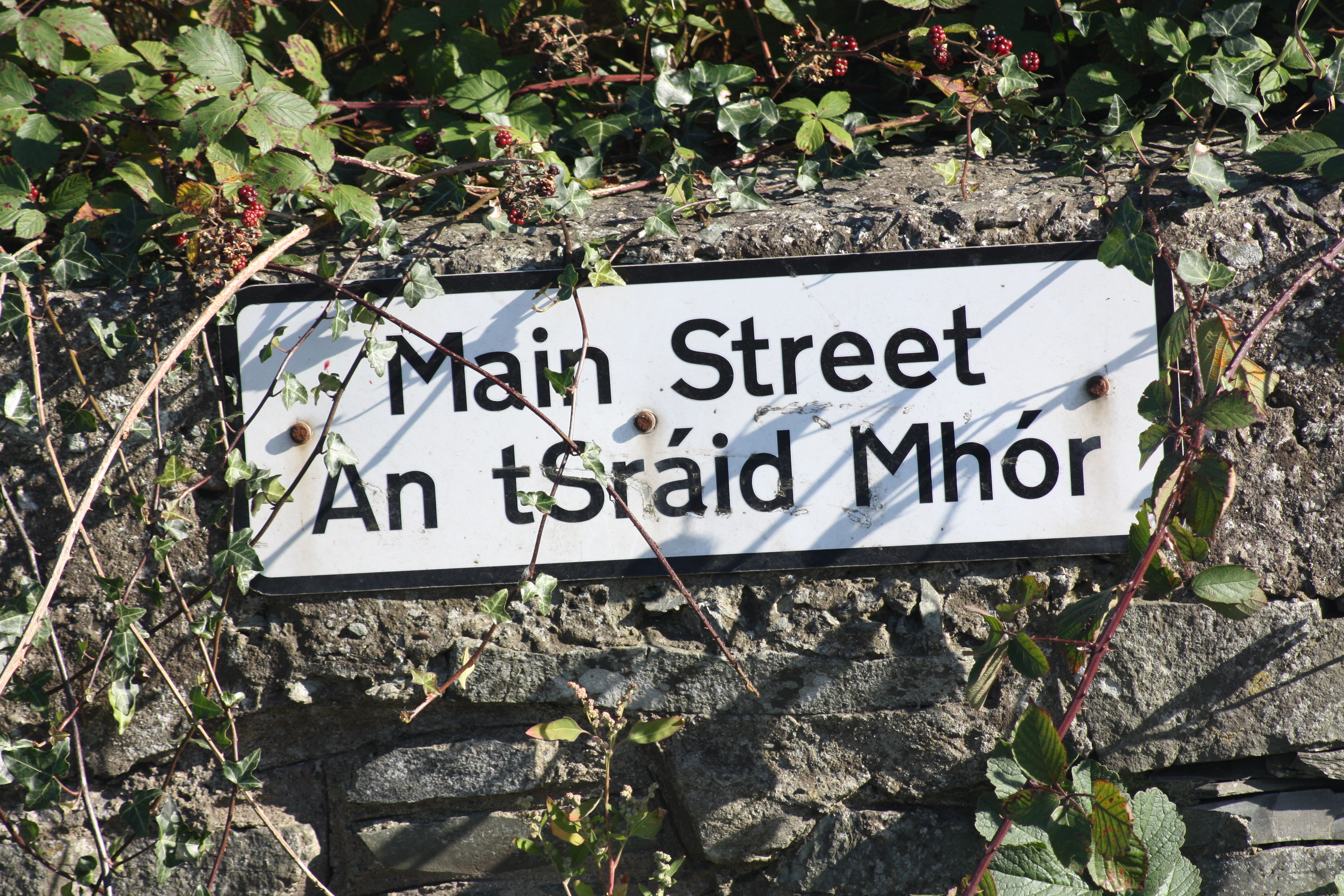
Bilingual Main Street sign in Killough, County Down, Northern Ireland

The term High Street is far less commonly used in Ireland. There, like in the United States, Main Street tends to be used instead. Neither of Dublin's two main shopping streets (Grafton Street and Henry Street) carry this name, for example, nor does its main thoroughfare (O'Connell Street). While Dublin has street named High Street near Christchurch, formerly the centre of the medieval city, it is not a shopping street. The city of Cork's main shopping street is St Patrick's Street. The city's oldest streets are named North Main Street and South Main Street. Limerick's principal thoroughfare, like Dublin, is also O'Connell Street (the name is used in a number of other Irish towns in honour of Daniel O'Connell).

The term Main Street (Irish: An tSráid Mhór, literally "The Big/Great Street") is used across various types of settlements; from densely populated inner suburbs of Dublin such as Ranelagh, to satellite suburbs of the capital such as Swords, and also in villages and small towns throughout the country. For example, the OSI North Leinster Town Maps book lists sixteen "Main Streets" and only two "High Streets" in its thirty-town index of street names. Similarly, the OSI Dublin Street Guide (covering all of Dublin City and County Dublin) lists twenty "Main Streets" and only two "High Streets".

Some Irish towns do have a major shopping street named High Street (Irish: An tSráid Ard), including Killarney, Galway, Wexford, Ballinrobe, Westport, Bagenalstown, Macroom, Tuam, Wicklow, Trim, Monaghan, Kilkenny, and Kilrush.

Bantry, County Cork is an interesting variant; the main shopping street is called High Street in its western part and Main Street in its eastern part. The same is found in Athlone and Birr, County Offaly.

=== Jamaica ===
In Jamaica, the main commercial district is Front Street (especially in cities located alongside a waterway).

=== Norway ===
In Norway, the main commercial and administrative street is most often 'Storgaten/Storgata' (Grand Street)

=== Sweden ===
In Sweden, the main street is often 'Storgatan' (Grand Street), but as common is 'Drottninggtan' (Queen's street) and 'Kungsgatan' (King's Street)'

=== United States ===
The equivalent in the United States is Main Street. In some sections of the United States, the main commercial district is (or was) Front Street (especially in cities located alongside a waterway, such as Manhattan and Philadelphia).

== See also ==
- High Street chic
- History of Retail
- Main street
- Downtown
- Central business district
- City centre
- Poblacion
- Shopping
