= Jean-François Melon =

French economist

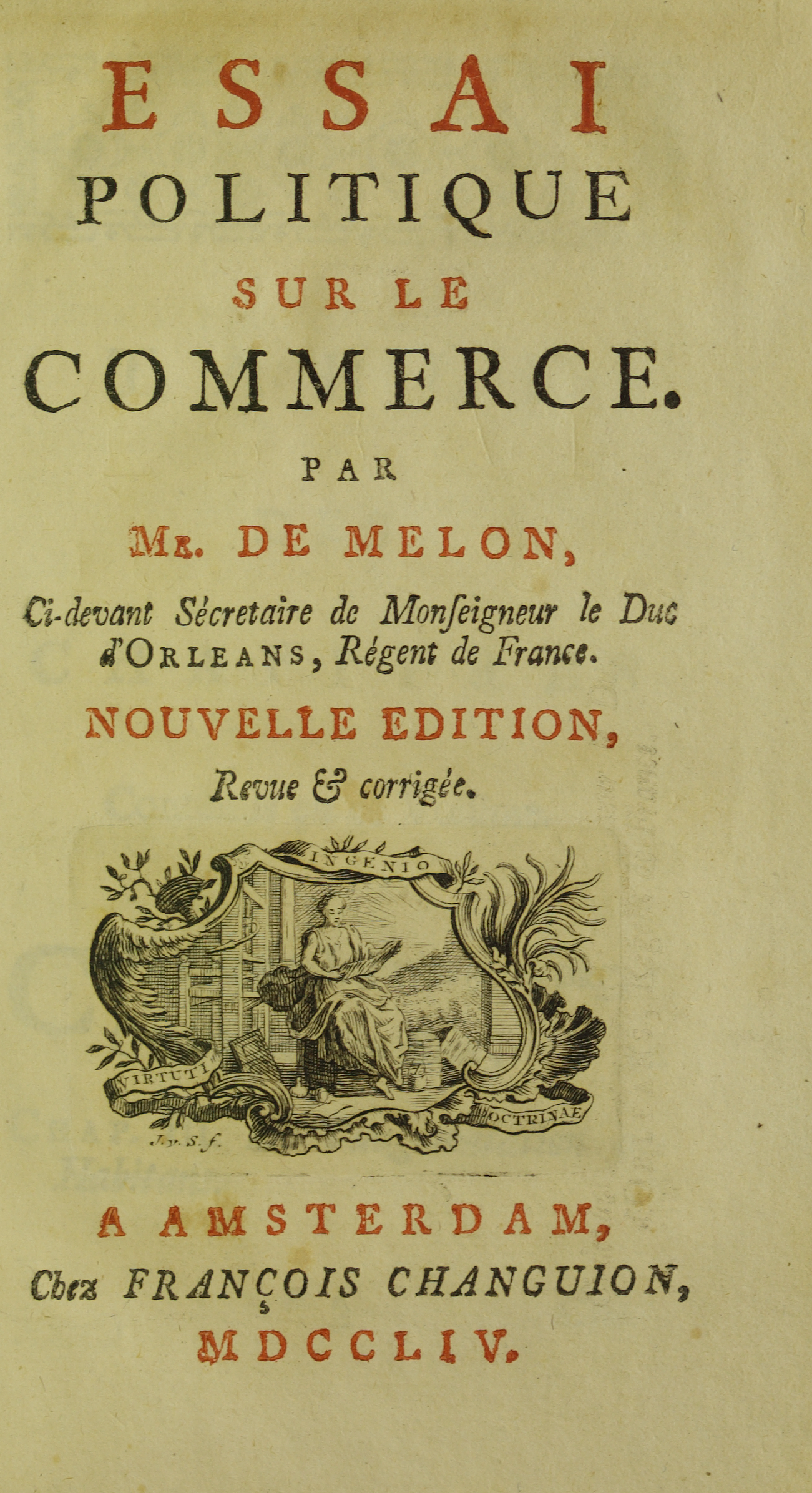
- Political Essay upon Commerce (1754)
- Born: 1675; Tulle, Limousin (province), France
- Died: 1738 (aged 62–63); Paris, France

Philosophical work
- Era: 18th-century philosophy
- Main interests: Political economy

Jean-François Melon (French: [məlɔ̃]; 1675–1738) was a French political economist, considered one of the precursors of the physiocracy movement. According to István Hont, his Political Essay upon Commerce was the most widely available defense of luxury in France in the early 18th century.

== Writings ==
Melon was a close associate of John Law. Melon sought to adapt Colbertiste ideas with the views of English mercantilist economists. Melon followed John Law on monetary theory and defended paper currency.

Melon was a contemporary of Montesquieu, and belonged to the same Bordeaux coterie. His Political Essay upon Commerce followed Montesquieu's argument in Considerations on the Causes of the Grandeur and Decadence of the Romans and Universal Monarchy. Melon and Montesquieu defended luxury against those who believed that decadence had been the cause of the fall of the Roman Empire, and who suggested parallels with the policies of Jean-Baptiste Colbert and Louis XIV. In a novel evoking Montesquieu's Persian Letters, Melon presented a parable of military and peaceful means by which a country might achieve national greatness through the example of an Afghan ruler who conquered Persia and the Punjab.

=== Political Essay upon Commerce ===
In his Political Essay upon Commerce, Melon argued that states follow either a "spirit of conquest" or a "spirit of preservation". To provide a modern illustration of this distinction, Melon proposed three models of commercial policy. He used these models to demonstrate that war against a country with a commercial monopoly was just—significant for the reason that England was regarded as a commercial monopolist in France in this period, and that a country with a commercial monopoly in food would defeat a country without such a monopoly. Melon did not desire a monopolistic empire for France, however, and preferred that countries become self-sufficient in food. Instead, Melon proposed that France seek a commercial monopoly and establish hegemony over Europe.

Melon's political economy was founded on a three-stages theory, in which basic necessities were followed by manufactured goods, which were in turn followed by luxuries. Progression from necessities to luxuries was only possible with a surplus in goods of each kind. Like the physiocrats, Melon believed that agriculture was the foundation of a nation's economy, but believed that manufactured goods were the source of a nation's greatness. Melon argued in favour of free trade in grain and inflationary monetary policies to improve France's balance of trade.

Melon presented arguments against those who opposed luxury, which they associated with decadence and the decay of civic virtue—a view popularised by the writings of François Fénelon—advocated sumptuary laws to correct the French balance of trade. For Melon, luxury was a promoter of trade, and represented a "spur for the multitude" present in every "well-governed society". Melon popularised Bernard Mandeville's defense of luxury in The Fable of the Bees in France.

== Publications ==
- Mahmoud le Gasnévide, 1729
- Essai politique sur le commerce, 1734

== Bibliography ==
- Entry in Dictionnaire d’économie politique de Charles Coquelin, Éd. Guillaumin, 1864, p. 152-153
- Bouzinac, J., Jean-François Melon, économiste, Toulouse, 1906; New York, 1970.
- Duffrenoy, Marie-Louise, L'idée de progrès et la recherche de la matière d'Orient: Jean François Melon et les sciences économiques, Paris, 1964.
- Megnet, Franz, Jean-François Melon (1675 bis 1738). Ein origineller Vertreter der vorphysiokratischen Ökonomen Frankreichs, Zurich, 1955.
- Rebière, Alphonse, Jean-François Melon: l'économiste, Tulle, 1896.
