= Frederick Kaye =

Frederick Kaye may refer to:

- Frederick A. Kaye (1796–1866), mayor of Louisville, Kentucky
- F. B. Kaye (Frederick Benjamin Kaye, 1892–1930), scholar
