= Cité Elgé =

Film studios located in Paris

- Founded: 1905; 120 years ago in Buttes-Chaumont, Paris, France

Cité Elgé (French pronunciation: [site ɛlʒe]) were French film studios located in Paris. They were constructed in 1905 in the Buttes-Chaumont area of the city by Gaumont, a pioneer of European cinema. They were also known as the Studios des Buttes-Chaumont. For a period they were the largest studios in the world.

In 1953 the studios came under the control of the RTF television organisation. They closed in the 1990s and were redeveloped for residential use.

The documentary dedicated to the history of the studios "Les Buttes-Chaumont, Legendary Studios", directed by Jean-François Méplon and Fabien Lepage, produced by Olivier Wlodarczyk for Egodoc, was broadcast on April 3, 2015 on France 3 Paris Île-de-France.

== Bibliography ==
- Crisp, C.G. The Classic French Cinema, 1930-1960. Indiana University Press, 1993
