= Mandeville's paradox =

Paradoxical Philosophy

Mandeville's paradox is named after Bernard Mandeville (1670–1733), who posits that actions which may be qualified as vicious with regard to individuals have benefits for society as a whole. This is alluded to in the subtitle of his most famous work, The Fable of The Bees: or, Private Vices, Public Benefits. He states that "Fraud, Luxury, and Pride must live; Whilst we the Benefits receive."

The philosopher and economist Adam Smith opposes this (although he defends a moderated version of this line of thought in his theory of the invisible hand), since Mandeville fails, in his opinion, to distinguish between vice and virtue.
