= Consumer economy =

Economy focused on goods for individuals

A consumer economy describes an economy driven by consumer spending as a high percent of its gross domestic product (GDP), as opposed to other major components of GDP (gross private domestic investment, government spending, and imports netted against exports).

In the U.S., it is usually said by economists, including in Henry Hazlitt's "Economics in One Lesson" that 70% of spending is consumer-based, but this number is disputed by economists like Businessweek columnist Michael Mandel.

== Theory of the consumer economy ==
The absolute income hypothesis argues that income and demand generate consumption, and that the rise in GDP gives life to a rise in consumption. It was popularized by Keynes. Milton Friedman argues for a permanent income hypothesis, that consumption spending is a function of how rich you are.

=== Absolute income ===
Absolute income was theorized by Keynes. Its model is Ct=λYt. He believed that consumption at a certain time could be determined by marginal propensity to consume multiplied by income at that particular time.

=== Permanent income ===
Permanent income was theorized by Friedman. Instead of marginal propensity to consume, it theorizes "consumption smoothing", where people spread out changes in income using borrowing (e.g., credit cards).

== Criticism ==
Charles Hugh Smith, writing for Business Insider, argues that while the use of credit has positive features in low amounts, but that the consumer economy and its expansion of credit produces consumer ennui because there is a marginal return to consumption, and that hyperinflation experts recommended investment in tangible goods. Smith raises the issues of storage and maintenance of goods as limitations and problems of the consumer economy, as demand will eventually have to stagnate and credit will one day be denied.

== Consumer economies in the world ==
Many capitalist countries have an economy that is driven by the economic activities of its constituents. England and America have particularly influential economies.

=== Western ===
==== England ====
===== History =====
The consumer revolution in England is generally understood to have been in the eighteenth century, although the concept of consumerism was perceived to have appeared in the late 1500s and 1600s. Prior to this, the Middle Ages were understood to have been a time of perpetual material poverty, in which the concept of the commodity or the concept of the consumer did not exist. Maryanne Kowaleski argues against this view, arguing that medieval charity, instructional guidebooks, and population growth (paralleled by that of currency), created a consumer economy in the pre-Great Famine era Research by people like Britnell and Campbell suggest commercialization first appeared in the medieval period, and researchers like Christopher Woolgar have studied consumption practices in elite households.

In their economy, they had many exotic items (because of the imperial conquests of the British Empire) and it created an environment for a desire-based mode of shopping that was pleasurable, not mundane. Romantic literary critic Andrea K. Henderson argued that this influenced Romantic-era poetry because the poets were often part of an urban society. desiring things that could not be easily attained and were unavailable. This influenced their interpretation of things like the past, and the non-urban natural world, because they had to construct narratives to understand things that were inaccessible to them.

==== United States ====
===== Historical =====
In an essay for the book "An Emotional History of the United States", Susan J. Matt describes "aspirational envy" within the middle class toward the "bourgeois", during a period with a pool of goods that was growing rather than remaining finite.

The US consumer economy in the 1920s included many leisure items and products that improved housework. They introduced advertising to sell goods and department stores were created. They introduced lines of credit and installment plans to consumers who could or would not buy things immediately.

===== Modern =====
Consumer spending in the US rose from about 62% of GDP in 1960, where it stayed until about 1981, and has since risen to 71% in 2013.

In the first economic quarter of 2010, a report from the Bureau of Economic Analysis in the U.S. Department of Commerce stated that real gross domestic product rose by about 3.2 percent, and that this represents a difference from the fourth quarter of 2009. In that fourth quarter real GDP increased by 5.4 percent. It states that "[t]he increase in real GDP in the first quarter primarily reflected positive contributions from personal consumption expenditures, private inventory investment, exports, and nonresidential fixed investment that were partly offset by decreases in state and local government spending and in residential fixed investment."

=== Africa ===
According to Kevin O'Marah of Forbes magazine, Africa's consumer economies remained "buoyant" despite the worldwide collapse in the commodity industry, despite the fact that commodity extraction industries have long dominated the region.

=== Asia ===
==== China ====
Some analysts, including an anonymous columnist at The Economist stated in 2014 and early 2015 that China was likely to become a consumer economy. They regarded it as the second-biggest consumer.

After 10 years of development in China, the growth rate of consumption level of rural residents has gradually surpassed that of urban residents. On the other hand, the consumption structure between the two is also slowly assimilating.

In the end of 2021, McKinsey & Company, a global management consultancy, estimated China to be the largest consumer economy today as measured in purchasing power parity (PPP) terms. It projected that over the next decade, China might add more consumption than any other country and was expected to generate more than one-quarter of all global consumption growth. In 2022, under the influence of the COVID pandemic and the global economic slowdown, Chinese consumers in 2022 grew more cautious in spending and strengthened their intent to put their money in the bank. That said, McKinsey still observed resilience in China's economy, with a rise of 5.3% in the nominal disposable income per capita and a minimal consumer price inflation of 2.0%.

==== India ====
India's consumer economy is among the largest and fastest growing in the world, with the final consumption expenditure accounting for over two-thirds of GDP in 2025. A January 2019 report by the World Economic Forum and Bain & Company projected that India would become the world's third-largest consumer market by 2030, with spending rising to $6 trillion—stating that income growth in the country will transform it from a "bottom of the pyramid economy" to a middle-class one.

==== Philippines ====
The GDP in the country grew 6.3% in 2015. Their inflation rate was about 1.4%, and the service sector had grown, becoming a large part of GDP. The economy did not generate a large amount of savings, despite the fact that the 6% growth during the economic recovery of the 3rd and 4th quarter was largely driven by consumer spending.

== See also ==
- Consumerism
- Economic growth
- Service economy
