= F. B. Kaye =

American scholar (1892–1930)

- Born: Frederick Benjamin Kaye; April 20, 1892; New York City, New York, U.S.
- Died: 1930 (aged 37–38)

Academic background
- Education: Yale University (BA, MA)

Academic work
- Sub-discipline: English literature
- Institutions: Northwestern University

Frederick Benjamin Kaye (April 20, 1892 – 1930) was an American scholar who was notable for his work on Bernard Mandeville.

== Early life and education ==
Kaye was born in New York City as Frederick Benjamin Kugelman to Julius G. Kugelman, a native of Hamburg, Germany, who had emigrated to New York. Frederick Kugelman subsequently changed his surname to Kaye. He was educated at Yale University, where he obtained a Bachelor of Arts in 1914 and a Master of Arts in 1916.

== Career ==
Kaye was professor of English at Northwestern University from 1918 to 1930. During his career, Kaye became known for his scholarship on the topic of Bernard Mandeville. In 1975, Mandeville Studies claimed that Kaye "almost single-handedly revived Mandeville as one of the most important writers of the eighteenth century".

== Works ==
- "The Writings of Bernard Mandeville: A Bibliographical Survey". The Journal of English and Germanic Philology. 20 (4): 419–467. October 1921 – via Internet Archive.
- "The Influence of Bernard Mandeville". Studies in Philology. 19 (1): 83–108. January 1922 – via Internet Archive.
- '"Mandeville on the Origin of Language". Modern Language Notes. 39 (3): 136–142. March 1924. doi:10.2307/2915148..
- (with R. S. Crane), 'A Census of British Newspapers and Periodicals, 1620-1800', Studies in Philology, Vol. 24, No. 1 (Jan., 1927), pp. 1–205.
