= István Hont =

István Hont (15 April 1947, Budapest – 29 March 2013) was a Hungarian-born British historian of economics and political thought, University Reader in the History of Political Thought at the University of Cambridge.

Hont was supervised as a doctoral student at Oxford by Hugh Trevor-Roper. He was elected a Fellow of King's College, Cambridge in 1978. From 1978 to 1984 he directed a King's College Research Centre project 'Political Economy and Society 1750–1850' with Michael Ignatieff, out of which grew their co-edited volume Wealth and Virtue. Hont was invited to be a professor in political thought at Columbia University, and was a visiting fellow at the Collegium Budapest in 1993–4., but remained at Cambridge until his death. He and Raymond Geuss organized the Cambridge Seminars in Political Thought and Intellectual History for 2007/8, attracting a range of international scholars to participate in the seminar series.

Though Hont's scholarly articles – on such figures as David Hume and Adam Smith, and on such themes as the Scottish Enlightenment, commerce, nationalism, national debt, luxury and political economy – have won awards for breaking new ground, the scope and nature of his overall ambition were difficult to gauge until the articles were collected together in Jealousy of Trade. An extended introduction to Jealousy of Trade emphasized the absence of economic questions in the seventeenth-century thought of Thomas Hobbes, traced (via Samuel Pufendorf) the eighteenth-century emergence of commerce as a problem for political theory, and used eighteenth-century debates about the interaction of politics and commerce to suggest a new perspective for thinking about economic nationalism in the nineteenth century and beyond.

== Works ==
- Hont, Istvan; Ignatieff, Michael, eds. (1983). Wealth and Virtue: The Shaping of Political Economy in the Scottish Enlightenment. Cambridge University Press. ISBN 0-521-23397-6.
- 'Free trade and the economic limits to national politics: neo-Machiavellian political economy reconsidered', in John Dunn (ed.), The Economic Limits to Modern Politics, Cambridge University Press, 1990.
- 'Commercial Society and Political Theory in the Eighteenth Century: The Problem of Authority in David Hume and Adam Smith' in Willem Melching & Wyger Velema (eds.) Main Trends in Cultural History, 1994.
- 'The Permanent Crisis of a Divided Mankind: 'Contemporary Crisis of the Nation State' in historical perspective', Political Studies 42 (1994). Reprinted in John Dunn (ed.) Crisis of the Nation State?, 1995, and Hont, Jealousy of Trade, 447–528. Winner in 1994 of the Political Studies Association's Harrison Prize for the best paper published in political studies
- Jealousy of Trade: International Competition and the Nation-State in Historical Perspective, Harvard University Press, 2005. ISBN 0-674-01038-8. Winner in 2007 of the J. David Greenstone Book Prize, awarded by the Politics and History section of the American Political Science Association, and of the Joseph J. Spengler Best Book Award, sponsored by the History of Economics Society.
- 'The Luxury Debate in the Early Enlightenment', in Mark Goldie & Robert Wokler (eds.) The Cambridge History of Eighteenth-Century Political Thought, Cambridge University Press, 2006.
- (eds. by Béla Kapossy and Michael Sonenscher) Politics in Commercial Society: Jean-Jacques Rousseau and Adam Smith, Harvard University Press, 2015.
- (eds. by Lasse S. Andersen, with Béla Kapossy and Richard Whatmore) Political Economy from Pufendorf to Marx: Culture, Needs and Property Rights, Cambridge University Press, 2026.
