= The Fable of the Bees =

1714 book by Bernard Mandeville

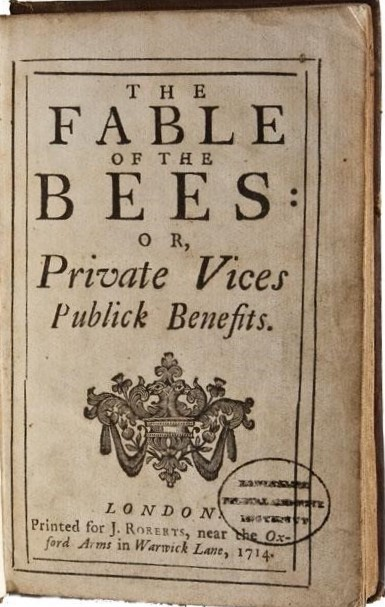
- First edition title page
- Author: Bernard Mandeville
- Language: English
- Publisher: J. Roberts
- Publication date: 1714
- Publication place: Kingdom of England

The Fable of the Bees: or, Private Vices, Publick Benefits is a 1714 book by the Anglo-Dutch philosopher Bernard Mandeville. It consists of the satirical poem The Grumbling Hive: or, Knaves turn'd Honest, which was first published anonymously in 1705; a prose discussion of the poem, called "Remarks"; and an essay, An Enquiry into the Origin of Moral Virtue. In 1723, a second edition was published with two new essays.

In The Grumbling Hive, Mandeville describes a bee community that thrives until the bees decide to live by honesty and virtue. As they abandon their desire for personal gain, the economy of their hive collapses, and they go on to live simple, "virtuous" lives in a hollow tree. Mandeville's implication—that private vices create social benefits—caused a scandal when public attention turned to the work, especially after its 1723 edition.

Mandeville's social theory and the thesis of the book, according to E. J. Hundert, is that "contemporary society is an aggregation of self-interested individuals necessarily bound to one another neither by their shared civic commitments nor their moral rectitude, but, paradoxically, by the tenuous bonds of envy, competition and exploitation". Mandeville implied that people were hypocrites for espousing rigorous ideas about virtue and vice while they failed to act according to those beliefs in their private lives. He observed that those preaching against vice had no qualms about benefiting from it in the form of their society's overall wealth, which Mandeville saw as the cumulative result of individual vices (such as luxury, gambling, and crime, which benefited lawyers and the justice system).

Mandeville's challenge to the popular idea of virtue—in which only unselfish, Christian behaviour was virtuous—caused a controversy that lasted through the eighteenth century and influenced thinkers in moral philosophy and economics. In recent years, philosophers have imported the idea of Mandevillean virtue and vice from ethics to epistemology, arguing that what might seem like intellectual vices in individuals sometimes contribute to group inquiry. The Fable influenced ideas about the division of labour and the free market (laissez-faire), and the philosophy of utilitarianism was advanced as Mandeville's critics, in defending their views of virtue, also altered them. His work influenced Scottish Enlightenment thinkers such as Francis Hutcheson, David Hume, and Adam Smith.

== Publication history ==
The genesis of The Fable of the Bees was Mandeville's anonymous publication of the poem The Grumbling Hive: or, Knaves Turn'd Honest on 2 April 1705 as a sixpenny quarto, which was also pirated at a half-penny. In 1714, the poem was included in The Fable of the Bees: or, Private Vices, Publick Benefits, also published anonymously. This book included a commentary, An Enquiry into the Origin of Moral Virtue, and twenty "Remarks". The second edition in 1723 sold at five shillings and included two new parts: An Essay on Charity and Charity-Schools and A Search into the Nature of Society. This edition attracted the most interest and notoriety. Beginning with the 1724 edition Mandeville included a "Vindication", first published in the London Journal, as a response to his critics. Between 1724 and 1732, further editions were published, with changes limited to matters of style, slight alterations of wording, and a few new pages of preface. During this period, Mandeville worked on a "Part II", which consisted of six dialogs and was published in 1729 as The Fable of the Bees. Part II. By the Author of the First.

A French translation was published in 1740. The translation, by Émilie du Châtelet, was not particularly faithful to the original; according to Kaye, it was "a free one, in which the Rabelaisian element in Mandeville was toned down". By this time, French literati were familiar with Mandeville from the 1722 translation by Justus van Effen of his Free Thoughts on Religion, the Church and National Happiness. They had also followed the Fable's scandal in England. The book was especially popular in France between 1740 and 1770. It influenced Jean-François Melon and Voltaire, who had been exposed to the work in England between 1726 and 1729 and reflected on some of its ideas in his 1736 poem Le Mondain. A German translation first appeared in 1761.

F. B. Kaye's 1924 edition, based on his Yale dissertation and published by Oxford University's Clarendon Press, included extensive commentary and textual criticism. It renewed interest in the Fable, whose popularity had faded through the 19th century. Kaye's edition, a "model of what a fully annotated edition ought to be" and still important to Mandeville studies, was reprinted in 1988 by the American Liberty Fund.

== Synopsis ==
=== Poem ===
The Grumbling Hive: or, Knaves turn'd Honest (1705) is in doggerel couplets of eight syllables over 433 lines. It is a commentary on contemporary English society. Economist John Maynard Keynes described the poem as setting forth "the appalling plight of a prosperous community in which all the citizens suddenly take it into their heads to abandon luxurious living, and the State to cut down armaments, in the interests of Saving". It begins:

A Spacious Hive well stock'd with Bees,
That lived in Luxury and Ease;
And yet as fam'd for Laws and Arms,
As yielding large and early Swarms;
Was counted the great Nursery 5
Of Sciences and Industry.
No Bees had better Government,
More Fickleness, or less Content.
They were not Slaves to Tyranny,
Nor ruled by wild Democracy; 10
But Kings, that could not wrong, because
Their Power was circumscrib'd by Laws.

The "hive" is corrupt but prosperous, yet it grumbles about lack of virtue. A higher power decides to give them what they ask for:

But Jove, with Indignation moved,
At last in Anger swore, he'd rid 230
The bawling Hive of Fraud, and did.
The very Moment it departs,
And Honesty fills all their Hearts;

This results in a rapid loss of prosperity, though the newly virtuous hive does not mind:

For many Thousand Bees were lost.
Hard'ned with Toils, and Exercise
They counted Ease it self a Vice;
Which so improved their Temperance; 405
That, to avoid Extravagance,
They flew into a hollow Tree,
Blest with Content and Honesty.

The poem ends in a famous phrase:

Bare Virtue can't make Nations live
In Splendor; they, that would revive
A Golden Age, must be as free,
For Acorns, as for Honesty.

=== Charity schools ===
In the 1723 edition, Mandeville added An Essay on Charity and Charity-Schools. He criticised charity schools, which were designed to educate the poor and, in doing so, instill virtue in them. Mandeville disagreed with the idea that education encourages virtue because he did not believe that evil desires existed only in the poor; rather he saw the educated and wealthy as much more crafty. Mandeville believed that educating the poor increased their desires for material things, defeating the purpose of the school and making it more difficult to provide for them.

== Contemporary reception ==
At the time, the book was considered scandalous, being understood as an attack on Christian virtues. The 1723 edition gained a notoriety that previous editions had not, and caused debate among men of letters throughout the eighteenth century. The popularity of the second edition in 1723 in particular has been attributed to the collapse of the South Sea Bubble a few years earlier. For those investors who had lost money in the collapse and related fraud, Mandeville's pronouncements about private vice leading to public benefit would have been infuriating.

The book was vigorously combatted by, among others, the philosopher George Berkeley and the priest William Law. Berkeley attacked it in the second dialogue of his Alciphron (1732). The 1723 edition was presented as a nuisance by the Grand Jury of Middlesex, who proclaimed that the purpose of the Fable was to "run down Religion and Virtue as prejudicial to Society, and detrimental to the State; and to recommend Luxury, Avarice, Pride, and all vices, as being necessary to Public Welfare, and not tending to the Destruction of the Constitution". In the rhetoric of the presentment, Mandeville saw the influence of the Society for the Reformation of Manners. The book was also denounced in the London Journal.

Other writers attacked the Fable, notably Archibald Campbell (1691–1756) in his Aretelogia. Francis Hutcheson also denounced Mandeville, initially declaring the Fable to be "unanswerable"―that is, too absurd for comment. Hutcheson argued that pleasure consisted in "affection to fellow creatures", and not the hedonistic pursuit of bodily pleasures. He also disagreed with Mandeville's notion of luxury, which he believed depended on too austere a notion of virtue. The modern economist John Maynard Keynes noted that "only one man is recorded as having spoken a good word for it, namely Dr. Johnson, who declared that it did not puzzle him, but 'opened his eyes into real life very much'."

Adam Smith expressed his disapproval of The Fable of the Bees in Part VII, Section II of his Theory of Moral Sentiments. The reason that Smith heavily criticizes Mandeville is that Mandeville mistakes greed as a part of self-interest. Smith claims that, in reality, greed and the self-interest he comments on in the Wealth of Nations are separate concepts that affect the market very differently.

The book reached Denmark by 1748, where a major Scandinavian writer of the period, Ludvig Holberg (1684–1754), offered a new critique of the Fable—one that did not centre on "ethical considerations or Christian dogma". Instead, Holberg questioned Mandeville's assumptions about the constitution of a good or flourishing society: "the question is whether or not a society can be called luxurious in which citizens amass great wealth which is theirs to use while others live in the deepest poverty. Such is the general condition in all the so-called flourishing cities which are reputed to be the crown jewels of the earth." Holberg rejected Mandeville's ideas about human nature—that such unequal states are inevitable because humans have an animal-like or corrupt nature—by offering the example of Sparta, the Ancient Greek city-state. The people of Sparta were said to have rigorous, immaterialistic ideals, and Holberg wrote that Sparta was strong because of this system of virtue: "She was free from internal unrest because there was no material wealth to give rise to quarrels. She was respected and honored for her impartiality and justice. She achieved dominion over the other Greeks simply because she rejected dominion."

Jean-Jacques Rousseau commented on the Fable in his Discourse on the Origin and Basis of Inequality Among Men (1754):

Mandeville sensed very well that even with all their morality men would never have been anything but monsters if nature had not given them pity in support of reason; but he did not see that from this quality alone flow all the social virtues he wants to question in men. In fact, what are generosity, clemency, humanity, if not pity applied to the weak, to the guilty, to the human species in general?

Mandeville sees greed as "beneficial to the public" and he denies men of all social virtues. It is on this latter point that Rousseau counters Mandeville. Despite some overlap between Rousseau's work on self-reliance and Mandeville's ideas, Rousseau identifies that virtues are applications of natural pity: "for is desiring that someone not suffer anything other than desiring to be happy?"

Rousseau attacked Mandeville in his Discourse on the Origin and Basis of Inequality Among Men primarily because Mandeville denies man of possessing social virtues. Rousseau counters Mandeville using an admission of Mandeville's as the basis of his argument. Mandeville admitted that nature provided man with pity. Rousseau uses this admission to point out how clemency, generosity, and humanity are applications of human pity applied. Hence, since Mandeville admits to the existence of pity within humanity he must admit to the existence of, in the least, these virtues of clemency, generosity, and humanity. Rousseau seals the point when he furthers it saying:

"Benevolence and friendship are, properly understood, products of a constant pity focused on a particular object: for is desiring that someone not suffer anything other than desiring that he be happy?"

Rousseau identifies that Mandeville's admittance of pity within humanity must also be an admittance to man possessing altruism.

In the 19th century, Leslie Stephen, writing for the Dictionary of National Biography, reported that "Mandeville gave great offense by this book, in which a cynical system of morality was made attractive by ingenious paradoxes. ... His doctrine that prosperity was increased by expenditure rather than by saving fell in with many current economic fallacies not yet extinct. Assuming with the ascetics that human desires were essentially evil and therefore produced 'private vices' and assuming with the common view that wealth was a 'public benefit', he easily showed that all civilization implied the development of vicious propensities.

== Analysis ==
As a satire, the poem and commentary point out the hypocrisy of men who promulgate ideas about virtue while their private acts are vices. The degree to which Mandeville's "rigoristic" definitions of virtue and vice followed those of English society as a whole has been debated by scholars. Kaye suggests that two related concepts of vice are at play in Mandeville's formulation. Christianity taught that a virtuous act was unselfish, and the philosophy of Deism suggested that the use of reason was virtuous because it would naturally reveal theological truth. Mandeville looked for acts of public virtue and could not find them, yet observed that some actions (which must then be vices) led to beneficial outcomes in society, such as a prosperous state. This was Mandeville's paradox, as embedded in the book's subtitle: "Private Vices, Publick Benefits".

Mandeville was interested in human nature, and his conclusions about it were extreme and scandalous to 18th-century Europeans. He saw humans and animals as fundamentally the same: in a state of nature, both behave according to their passions or basic desires. Man was different, though, in that he could learn to see himself through others' eyes, and thus modify his behaviour if there were a social reward for doing so. In this light Mandeville wrote of the method by which the selfish instincts of "savage man" had been subdued by the political organization of society. It was in the interest of those who had selfish motives, he argued, to preach virtuous behavior to others:

It being the Interest then of the very worst of them, more than any, to preach up Publick-spiritedness, that they might reap the Fruits of the Labour and Self-denial of others, and at the same time indulge their own Appetites with less disturbance, they agreed with the rest, to call every thing, which, without Regard to the Publick, Man should commit to gratify any of his Appetites, VICE; if in that Action there cou'd be observed the least prospect, that it might either be injurious to any of the Society, or ever render himself less serviceable to others: And to give the Name of VIRTUE to every Performance, by which Man, contrary to the impulse of Nature, should endeavour the Benefit of others, or the Conquest of his own Passions out of a Rational Ambition of being good.

To critics it appeared that Mandeville was promoting vice, but this was not his intention. He said that he wanted to "pull off the disguises of artful men" and expose "the hidden strings" that guided human behaviour. Nevertheless he was seen as a "modern defender of licentiousness", and talk of "private vices" and "public benefits" was common among the educated public in England.

=== As literature ===
Less attention has been paid to the literary qualities of Mandeville's book than to his argument. Kaye called the book "possessed of such extraordinary literary merit" but focused his commentary on its implications for moral philosophy, economics, and utilitarianism. Harry L. Jones, on the other hand, wrote in 1960 that the Fable "is a work having little or no merit as literature; it is a doggerel, pure and simple, and it deserves no discussion of those aspects of form by which art can be classified as art".

=== Economic views ===
Mandeville is today generally regarded as a serious economist and philosopher. His second volume of The Fable of the Bees in 1729 was a set of six dialogs that elaborated on his socio-economic views. His ideas about the division of labor draw on those of William Petty, and are similar to those of Adam Smith. Mandeville says:

When once Men come to be govern'd by written Laws, all the rest comes on a-pace. Now Property, and Safety of Life and Limb, may be secured: This naturally will forward the Love of Peace, and make it spread. No number of Men, when once they enjoy Quiet, and no Man needs to fear his Neighbour, will be long without learning to divide and subdivide their Labour...

Man, as I have hinted before, naturally loves to imitate what he sees others do, which is the reason that savage People all do the same thing: This hinders them from meliorating their Condition, though they are always wishing for it: But if one will wholly apply himself to the making of Bows and Arrows, whilst another provides Food, a third builds Huts, a fourth makes Garments, and a fifth Utensils, they not only become useful to one another, but the Callings and Employments themselves will in the same Number of Years receive much greater Improvements, than if all had been promiscuously follow'd by every one of the Five...

The truth of what you say is in nothing so conspicuous, as it is in Watch-making, which is come to a higher degree of Perfection, than it would have been arrived at yet, if the whole had always remain'd the Employment of one Person; and I am persuaded, that even the Plenty we have of Clocks and Watches, as well as the Exactness and Beauty they may be made of, are chiefly owing to the Division that has been made of that Art into many Branches.

The poem suggests many key principles of economic thought, including division of labor and the "invisible hand", seventy years before these concepts were more thoroughly elucidated by Adam Smith. Two centuries later, John Maynard Keynes cited Mandeville to show that it was "no new thing ... to ascribe the evils of unemployment to ... the insufficiency of the propensity to consume", a condition also known as the paradox of thrift, which was central to his own theory of effective demand.

=== Critique of meat consumption ===
In The Ethics of Diet (1883), Howard Williams devoted a chapter to Mandeville, arguing that The Fable of the Bees includes a sincere critique of meat eating. Williams highlighted Mandeville's ethical concerns about killing animals for food, quoting:

I have often thought, if it was not for this tyranny which custom usurps over us, that men of any tolerable good-nature could never be reconciled to the killing of so many animals for their daily food, as long as the bountiful earth so plentifully provides them with varieties of vegetable dainties.

Williams presented Mandeville as an early voice of moral opposition to flesh eating. Henry Stephens Salt later acknowledged this aspect of Mandeville's work in his 1892 treatise Animals' Rights: Considered in Relation to Social Progress, where The Fable of the Bees appeared in the "Bibliography of the Rights of Animals". Mandeville's remarks also influenced the early vegetarian writer Joseph Ritson to adopt a vegetarian diet.
