= Bernard Mandeville =

Anglo-Dutch writer and physician (1670–1733)

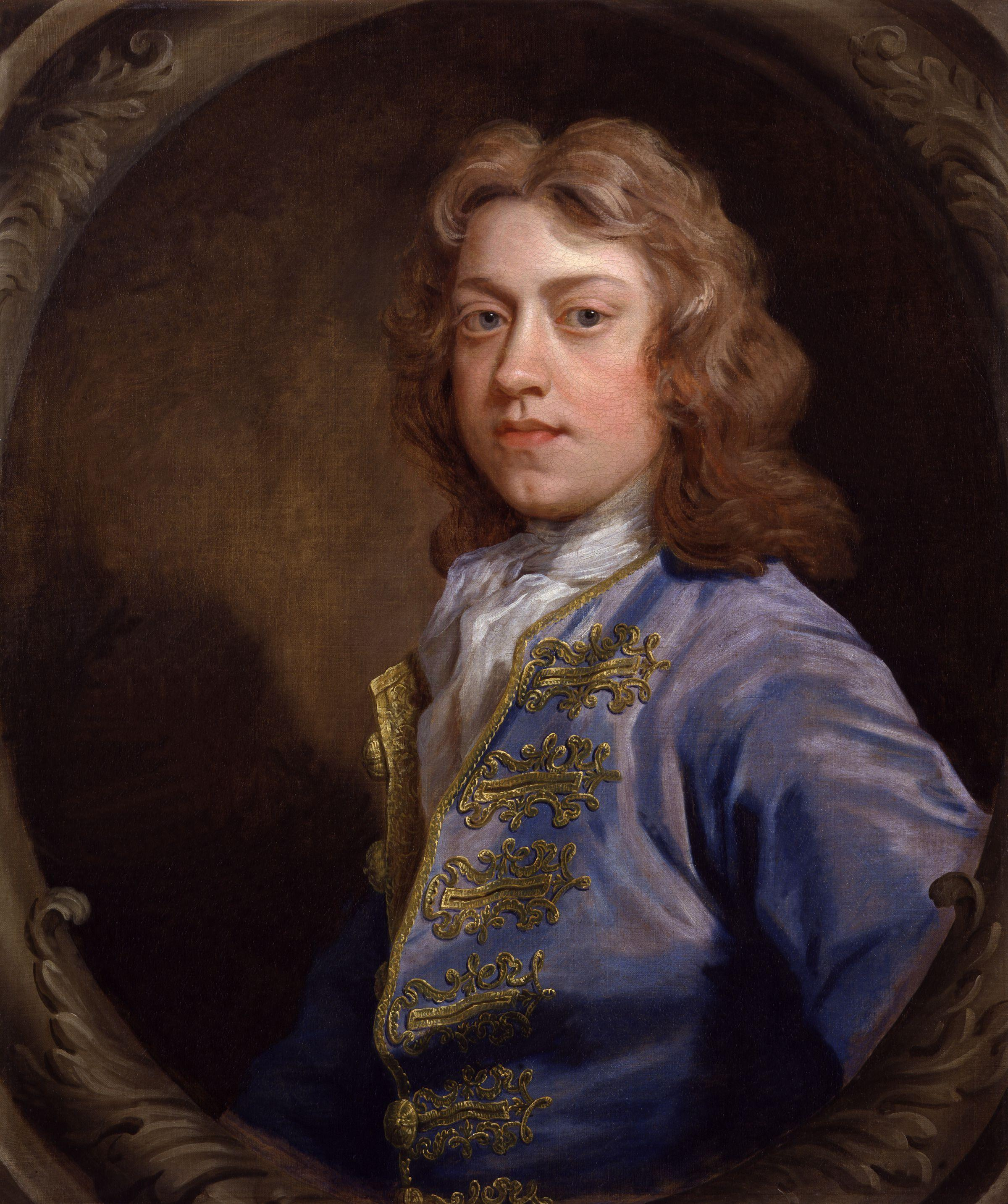
- Possible portrait of Mandeville
- Born: 15 November 1670; Rotterdam, Dutch Republic
- Died: 21 January 1733 (aged 62); Hackney, Kingdom of Great Britain

Philosophical work
- Era: 18th-century philosophy
- Region: Western philosophy
- School: Classical economics
- Main interests: Political philosophy, ethics, economics
- Notable ideas: The unknowing co-operation of individuals, modern free market, division of labour

Bernard Mandeville, or Bernard de Mandeville (/ˈmændəˌvɪl/; 15 November 1670 – 21 January 1733), was an Anglo-Dutch philosopher, political economist, satirist, writer and physician. Born in Rotterdam, he lived most of his life in England and used English for most of his published works. He became famous for The Fable of the Bees.

== Life ==
Mandeville was born on 15 November 1670, in Rotterdam, the Netherlands, where his father was a prominent physician of Huguenot origin. On leaving the Erasmus school at Rotterdam he showed his ability by an Oratio scholastica de medicina (1685), and at Leiden University in 1689 he produced the thesis De brutorum operationibus, in which he advocated the Cartesian theory of automatism among animals. In 1691 he took his medical degree, pronouncing an inaugural disputation, De chylosi vitiata. He moved to England to learn the language, and succeeded so remarkably that many refused to believe he was a foreigner. His father had been banished from Rotterdam in 1693 for involvement in the Costerman tax riots on 5 October 1690; Bernard himself may well have been involved.

As a physician Mandeville was well respected and his literary works were successful as well. His conversational abilities won him the friendship of Lord Macclesfield (chief justice 1710–1718), who introduced him to Joseph Addison, described by Mandeville as "a parson in a tye-wig." He died of influenza on 21 January 1733 at Hackney, aged 62.

There is a surviving image of Mandeville but many details of his life still have to be researched. Although the name Mandeville attests a French Huguenot origin, his ancestors had lived in the Netherlands since at least the 16th century. However, in the Oxford University Press journal Notes and Queries, Arne Jansen states that Mandeville's family bible shows him to have been "a fifth-generation Dutchman: his great-great-grandfather Johannes or Jean de Mandeville had come from Artesia to Groningen in 1569 as a captain in the companies of Caspar de Robles".

== Works ==
=== The Fable of the Bees ===
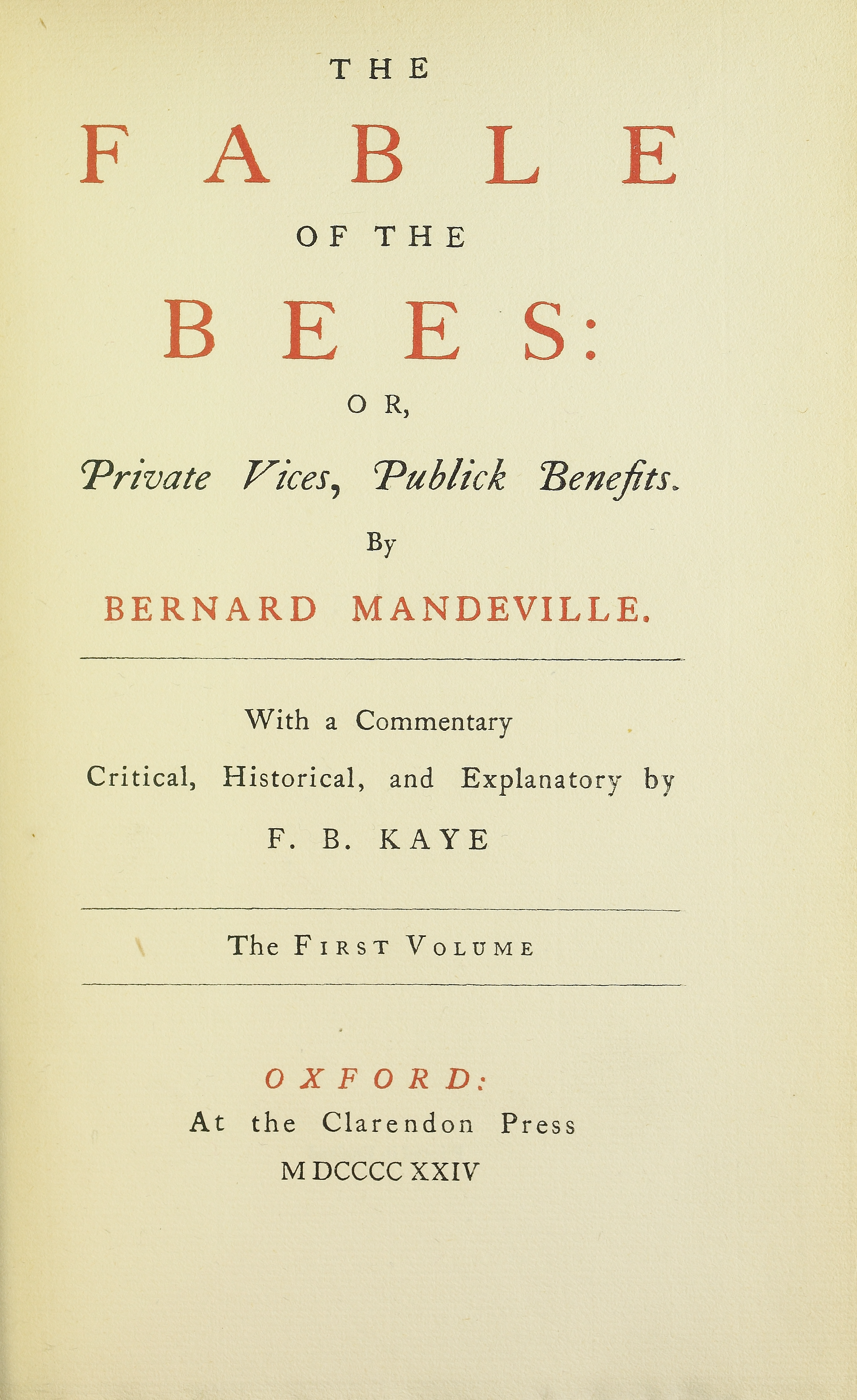
The Fable of the Bees, 1924 edition

In 1705, Mandeville published a poem under the title The Grumbling Hive, or Knaves Turn'd Honest (two hundred doggerel couplets). In The Grumbling Hive Mandeville describes a bee community thriving until the bees are suddenly made honest and virtuous. Without their desire for personal gain their economy collapses and the remaining bees go to live simple lives in a hollow tree, thus implying that without private vices there exists no public benefit.

In 1714, the poem was republished as an integral part of the Fable of the Bees: or, Private Vices, Public Benefits, consisting of a prose commentary, called Remarks, and an essay, An Enquiry into the Origin of Moral Virtue. The book was primarily written as a political satire on the state of England in 1705, when the Tories were accusing John Churchill, 1st Duke of Marlborough, and the ministry of advocating the War of the Spanish Succession for personal reasons.

In 1723, a later edition appeared, including An Essay on Charity and Charity Schools, and A Search into the Nature of Society. The former essay criticised the charity schools, designed to educate the poor and, in doing so, instil virtue in them. Mandeville disagreed with the idea that education adds virtue because he did not believe that evil desires existed only in the poor, but rather he saw the educated and wealthy as much more crafty. Mandeville also believed that educating the poor increased their desires for material things, defeating the purpose of the school and making it more difficult to provide for them. It was vigorously combatted by, among others, Bishop Berkeley and William Law, author of The Serious Call, and in 1729 was made the subject of a prosecution for its immoral tendency.

== Ideas ==
Mandeville's main thesis is that the actions of men cannot be divided into lower and higher. The higher life of man is a mere fiction introduced by philosophers and rulers to simplify government and the relations of society. In fact, virtue (which he defined as "every performance by which man, contrary to the impulse of nature, should endeavour the benefit of others, or the conquest of his own passions, out of a rational ambition of being good") is actually detrimental to the state in its commercial and intellectual progress. This is because it is the vices (i.e., the self-regarding actions of men) which alone, by means of inventions and the circulation of capital in connection with luxurious living, stimulate society into action and progress.

=== Private vice, public benefit ===
Mandeville concluded that vice, at variance with the "Christian virtues" of his time, was a necessary condition for economic prosperity. His viewpoint is more severe when juxtaposed to Adam Smith's. Both Smith and Mandeville believed that individuals' collective actions bring about a public benefit. However, what sets his philosophy apart from Smith's is his catalyst to that public benefit. Smith believed in a virtuous self-interest which results in invisible co-operation. For the most part, Smith saw no need for a guide to garner that public benefit. On the other hand, Mandeville believed it was vicious greed which led to invisible co-operation if properly channelled. Mandeville's qualification of proper channelling further parts his philosophy from Smith's laissez-faire attitude. Essentially, Mandeville called for politicians to ensure that the passions of man would result in a public benefit. It was his stated belief in the Fable of the Bees that "Private Vices by the dextrous Management of a skilful Politician may be turned into Publick Benefits".

In the Fable he shows a society possessed of all the virtues "blest with content and honesty," falling into apathy and utterly paralysed. The absence of self-love (cf. Hobbes) is the death of progress. The so-called higher virtues are mere hypocrisy, and arise from the selfish desire to be superior to the brutes. "The moral virtues are the political offspring which flattery begot upon pride." Similarly he arrives at the great paradox that "private vices are public benefits".

Among other things, Mandeville argues that the basest and vilest behaviours produce positive economic effects. A libertine, for example, is a vicious character, and yet his spending will employ tailors, servants, perfumers, cooks, prostitutes. These persons, in turn, will employ bakers, carpenters, and the like. Therefore, the rapaciousness and violence of the base passions of the libertine benefit society in general. Similar satirical arguments were made by the Restoration and Augustan satirists. A famous example is Mandeville's A Modest Defence of Publick Stews, which argued for the introduction of public, state-controlled brothels. The 1726 paper acknowledges women's interests and mentions e.g. the clitoris as the centre of female sexual pleasure. Jonathan Swift's 1729 satire A Modest Proposal is probably an allusion to Mandeville's title.

Mandeville was an early describer of the division of labour, and Adam Smith makes use of some of his examples.

Mandeville says:

But if one will wholly apply himself to the making of Bows and Arrows, whilst another provides Food, a third builds Huts, a fourth makes Garments, and a fifth Utensils, they not only become useful to one another, but the Callings and Employments themselves will in the same Number of Years receive much greater Improvements, than if all had been promiscuously follow'd by every one of the Five...

In Watch-making, which is come to a higher degree of Perfection, than it would have been arrived at yet, if the whole had always remain'd the Employment of one Person; and I am persuaded, that even the Plenty we have of Clocks and Watches, as well as the Exactness and Beauty they may be made of, are chiefly owing to the Division that has been made of that Art into many Branches. (The Fable of the Bees, Volume two)

— Adam Smith.

=== Vegetarianism ===
In his 1882 book on the history of vegetarianism, The Ethics of Diet, Howard Williams devoted a chapter to Mandeville, arguing that The Fable of the Bees contains a sincere critique of meat consumption. Williams cited Mandeville's words:

I have often thought, if it was not for this tyranny which custom usurps over us, that men of any tolerable good-nature could never be reconciled to the killing of so many animals for their daily food, as long as the bountiful earth so plentifully provides them with varieties of vegetable dainties.

Henry Stephens Salt also recognised The Fable of the Bees in his influential 1892 book on animal rights, Animals' Rights: Considered in Relation to Social Progress, where he included it in the "Bibliography of the Rights of Animals". Additionally, the work inspired early vegetarianism activist Joseph Ritson to adopt a vegetarian diet.

== Influence ==
While the author probably had no intention of subverting morality, his views of human nature were seen by his critics as cynical and degraded. Another of his works, A Search into the Nature of Society (1723), appended to the later versions of the Fable, also startled the public mind, which his last works, Free Thoughts on Religion (1720) and An Enquiry into the Origin of Honour and the Usefulness of Christianity (1732) did little to reassure. The work in which he approximates most nearly to modern views is his account of the origin of society. His a priori theories should be compared with the jurist Henry Maine's historical inquiries (Ancient Law). He endeavours to show that all social laws are the crystallised results of selfish aggrandizement and protective alliances among the weak. Denying any form of moral sense or conscience, he regards all the social virtues as evolved from the instinct for self-preservation, the give-and-take arrangements between the partners in a defensive and offensive alliance, and the feelings of pride and vanity artificially fed by politicians, as an antidote to dissension and chaos.

Mandeville's ironic paradoxes are a criticism of the "amiable" idealism of the Earl of Shaftesbury; their irony contrasts with the serious egoistic systems of Hobbes and Helvétius.

Mandeville's ideas about society and politics were praised by Friedrich Hayek, a proponent of Austrian economics, in his book Law, Legislation and Liberty. But it was above all Keynes who put it back in the spotlight in his Essay on Malthus and in the General Theory. Keynes considers Mandeville as a precursor of the foundation of his own theory of insufficient effective demand.

Karl Marx, in his seminal work Capital, credited Mandeville as "an honest man with a clear mind" for his conclusion that the wealth of society depended on the relative poverty of workers.

== Bibliography ==
- Aesop Dress'd, or a Collection of Fables writ in Familiar Verse (1704)
- Typhon: a Burlesque Poem (1704)
- The Planter's Charity (1704)
- The Virgin Unmasked (1709, 1724, 1731, 1742), a work in which the coarser side of his nature is prominent
- A Treatise of the Hypochondriack and Hysterick Passions (1711, 1715, 1730 (the issue of 1730 was entitled A Treatise of the Hypochondriack and Hysterick Diseases)) admired by Johnson (Mandeville here protests against speculative therapeutics, and advances fanciful theories of his own about animal spirits in connection with "stomachic ferment": he shows a knowledge of Locke's methods, and an admiration for Sydenham)
- The Fable of the Bees (1714, 1724)
- The Mischiefs that Ought Justly to be Apprehended from a Whig-Government (1714)
- Free Thoughts on Religion, the Church, and National Happiness (1720, 1721, 1723, 1729)
- A Modest Defence of Publick Stews (1724, 1740) Multiple formats at Ex-Classics
- An Enquiry into the Causes of the Frequent Executions at Tyburn (1725)
- An Enquiry into the Origin of Honour, and the Usefulness of Christianity in War (1732)
- A Letter to Dion, occasioned by his book called Alciphron or the Minute Philosopher (1732)

Renatus Willemsen, Bernard Mandeville : een ondeugende denker?, Noordboek, 2022.Other works attributed, wrongly, to him are The World Unmasked (1736) and Zoologia medicinalis hibernica (1744).

== See also ==
- Fable
- Physician writer
