= No Wit, No Help Like a Woman's =

Play by Thomas Middleton

No Wit, No Help Like a Woman's is a Jacobean tragicomic play by Thomas Middleton.

== Title ==
On the title page of the first published edition (1657), the play's title is rendered as follows:

$No \begin{Bmatrix} Wit \\ Help \end{Bmatrix} Like~a~Woman's$

This title is difficult to translate into conventional prose; most subsequent editions have called it No Wit, No Help Like a Woman's, but the 2007 Middleton complete works for Oxford University Press renders it as No Wit/Help Like a Woman's.

== Date ==
External evidence on the play's date is lacking. In the text of the play, the character Weatherwise repeatedly refers to almanacs; he quotes sixteen almanac proverbs or catchphrases – fifteen of which derive from the 1611 edition of Thomas Bretnor's almanac, a fact that yields the obvious likely date for the play. This procedure was not atypical of Middleton's practice; when he composed his Inner Temple Masque in 1618, he used eleven proverbs from Bretnor's 1618 almanac.

The play was revived in 1638. James Shirley staged it at the Werburgh Street Theatre in Dublin, and wrote a Prologue for the work that was published with Middleton's text in the first edition.

== Publication ==
The play was entered into the Stationers' Register on 9 September 1653 by the bookseller Humphrey Moseley. Moseley printed the first edition four years later, in 1657, in an octavo edition printed for Moseley by Thomas Newcomb. Nineteen copies of the 1657 octavo survive, an unusually large total for a play of its era. Middleton's original was not reprinted prior to the 19th century.

== Authorship ==
Both the Stationers' Register entry and the title page of the first edition attribute the play to "Tho. Middleton." Given the play's strong similarities with Middleton's other works, the accuracy of this attribution has never been disputed. 19th-century critic Charles W. Stork suggested William Rowley as a possible collaborator, though his hypothesis has been rejected due to lack of supporting evidence.

== Source and influences ==
Middleton borrowed the main plot of No Wit from a 1589 play, a comedy by Giambattista Della Porta titled La Sorella ("The Sister"). In turn, Middleton's play served as a source for a contemporaneous Latin scholastic play by Samuel Brooke called Adelphe. The extant manuscript of Adelphe states that that play was first performed in 1611, a validation for the dating of Middleton's play.

The play's subplot, which centers on Master Low-Water – and which was original with Middleton rather than borrowed from another source – had a long theatrical life over the coming centuries. It was adapted for the 1677 play The Counterfeit Bridegroom, or The Defeated Widow, a work variously ascribed to either Aphra Behn or Thomas Betterton. The Counterfeit Bridegroom in turn was adapted into William Taverner's The Artful Husband (1717), which then became George Colman the Elder's The Female Chevalier (1778), which became both Alicia Sheridan's The Ambiguous Lover (1781) and William Macready the Elder's The Bank Note, or Lesson for Ladies (1795).

== Characters ==
- Prologue
- Sir Oliver Twilight, a rich old knight
- Philip his son, servant to Mistress Grace
- Sandfield, friend to Philip, servant to Mistress Jane
- Master Sunset, true father of Mistress Grace
- Master Low-Water, a decayed gentleman
- Sir Gilbert Lambstone, suitor to Lady Goldenfleece
- Master Weatherwise, suitor to Lady Goldenfleece
- Master Pepperton, suitor to Lady Goldenfleece
- Master Overdone, suitor to Lady Goldenfleece
- Master Beveril, brother to Mistress Low-water
- Dutch Merchant
- Dutch Boy
- Savourwit, Sir Oliver's man
- Footman
- Peccadillie, Lady Goldenfleece's Clown
- Servants
- Six of Weatherwise's Tenants
- Lady Twilight, Philip's Mother
- Lady Goldenfleece, a rich Widow
- Mistress Low-Water
- Mistress Grace, Sunset's daughter, but supposed Twilight's
- Mistress Jane, Twilight's daughter, but supposed Sunset's
- In the masque, presenters of three of the Winds

== Synopsis ==
Prologue

The Prologue notes that it will be difficult to please everyone in the audience because everyone has come for different reasons: some for the wit, some for the costumes, some for comedy, some for passion, and some to arrange a lascivious meeting. But, despite this, the Prologue is confident that, as long as everyone can pay attention and understand the play, they will all be satisfactorily entertained.

=== Act I ===
Scene 1: A street near Sir Oliver Twilight's house

Master Sandfield is ready to kill his friend, Philip Twilight, because he believes Philip has been courting the woman he loves, Jane Sunset. Philip's servant, Savourwit, prevents Sandfield from killing Philip by explaining that the match between Philip and Jane is all Philip's father's doing and Philip is already married! A complicated story unfolds:

Ten years ago, Sir Oliver Twilight's wife and daughter, Lady Twilight and Grace, were kidnapped by 'Dunkirks' (French marauders) as they were crossing the English Channel on their way to Jersey; they were consequently sold and separated. Twilight didn't hear anything from either of them until a few months ago, when he received a letter saying that his wife's freedom could be bought for six hundred crowns. Twilight sent Philip and Savourwit to Jersey with the ransom money. On the way there, Philip and Savourwit stopped in a small town, where they wasted most of the money on women and partying. Philip also met and married a young woman, Grace. With the money gone and nothing to show for it, Philip and Savourwit returned home and told Sir Oliver that Lady Twilight was dead; they also told him that Philip's new wife Grace was his long-lost daughter and the ransom money had been spent to buy her freedom. This entire scheme was the brainchild of Savourwit, who prides himself on his knack for 'invention'.

Sandfield congratulates Savourwit on his 'invention' and makes up with Philip. Savourwit tells the friends that he has a new scheme in mind:

Because Sir Oliver Twilight believes that his 'long-lost daughter' Grace is still a maiden, he has made arrangements to marry her off to Weatherwise, a silly old fool. To get rid of Weatherwise, Savourwit will tell Sir Oliver that Sandfield wants to marry Grace: he is certain that Sir Oliver will prefer Sandfield as a suitor, especially because Sandfield does not require a dowry. Thus, Sandfield can pretend to marry Grace (a marriage that will not be legal because Grace is already married to Philip) and Philip can pretend to marry Jane (a marriage that will not be legal because Philip is already married to Grace). The couples can all live together under Sir Oliver Twilight's roof, maintaining appearances during the day, and swapping spouses at night. This way, Philip can still be with his wife (even though he has to pretend that she is his sister during the day) and Sandfield can be with Jane (even though he will have to pretend that she is his sister-in-law during the day).

Lady Goldenfleece, a rich widow, enters, followed she by her suitors: Sir Gilbert Lambston, Master Pepperton, and Master Overdone. They are followed by the two old men, Sir Oliver Twilight and Master Sunset, and their daughters, Grace Twilight and Jane Sunset. Savourwit notes that Lady Goldenfleece's recently deceased husband was a notorious usurer; he nearly doubled his wealth shortly before he died by seizing the property of a gentleman named Master Low-water.

Lady Goldenfleece greets Jane and Grace and alludes to a 'secret' regarding the girls. They beg her to tell them what the secret is, but she refuses. In an aside, Jane says that she wishes Lady Goldenfleece would be more kind to her relatives, the Low-waters. Everyone exits except Sir Oliver Twilight and Savourwit. Savourwit tells Sir Oliver that Sandfield is desperate to marry Grace and will take her without a dowry. Sir Oliver is pleased and promises to get rid of Weatherwise immediately. Savourwit exits; Weatherwise enters. Sir Oliver tells Weatherwise that he has changed his mind and does not want him to marry Grace. Weatherwise says that he will become a suitor to Lady Goldenfleece.

Scene 2: A room in Low-water's house

Mistress Low-water mourns her family's ruin and curses Lady Goldenfleece. Jane enters to ask Mistress Low-water if she knows anything about the mysterious secret that Lady Goldenfleece alluded to earlier. Mistress Low-water says it might have something to do with "some piece of money or land" that was bequeathed to Grace and Jane "by some departing friend on their deathbed". Jane thanks Mistress Low-water and exits.

A footman enters with a letter for Mistress Low-water from Sir Gilbert Lambston, a wealthy knight. Sir Gilbert wants to make Mistress Low-water his mistress and, in the letter, promises to double his previous offer of money if she agrees. He expects to marry Lady Goldenfleece soon, and will thus be able to pay for Mistress Low-water for her sexual services. Mistress Low-water says that Sir Gilbert's villainy almost makes her feel sorry for her 'enemy' Lady Goldenfleece. She swears that she will never become Sir Gilbert's mistress, but says that the letter is "welcome," hinting that she has a plan in mind.

Sir Gilbert enters. Mistress Low-water asks him to give her one day to consider his offer. He agrees and exits. Master Low-water enters. Mistress Low-water tells him that she thinks she has a way to restore them to their former wealth. Master Low-water agrees to go along with her plan.

Scene 3: A room in Sir Oliver Twilight's house

A Dutch merchant enters with news from Sir Oliver's wife: she wonders why Sir Oliver hasn't sent a ransom for her yet. Sir Oliver is shocked to hear that his wife is still alive. He tells the merchant that he sent his son and servant with the ransom ten weeks ago; they brought his daughter back, but said that his wife had died. The Dutch Merchant vows that he has seen Lady Twilight alive within the past month and asks if he can see the 'daughter' that Philip and Savourwit brought back with them.

Grace enters. The Dutch Merchant says that he has seen her before, at an inn in Antwerp. Grace worries that she has been found out and tells the merchant that he must be mistaken. The merchant sees through Savourwit's scheme; he tells Sir Oliver that he has been deceived by his son and servant: his wife is not dead, and this is not his real daughter. Sir Oliver is not sure what he should believe. He sends Grace away. The Dutch merchant says that he must leave for a moment to attend to a business matter. He leaves his little son in Sir Oliver's care and promises to return soon.

Savourwit enters and Sir Oliver confronts him with the merchant's allegations. Savourwit denies all. To cover himself, Savourwit pretends to have a conversation in Dutch with the merchant's little son, who speaks in a kind of pidgin English. Savourwit's 'Dutch' is almost pure gibberish (words such as "pisse" surface occasionally). Savourwit tells Sir Oliver that the boy has told him that the Dutch Merchant is crazy, and prone to telling wild tales. Sir Oliver is still uncertain what he should believe.

The Dutch merchant re-enters. Sir Oliver tells him that Savourwit has spoken with his son, who claims that the Dutch Merchant is crazy. After conferring with his son, the Dutch Merchant says that Savourwit is lying. Sir Oliver realizes he has been deceived by Savourwit. He invites the Dutch merchant to stay at his home.

=== Act II ===
Scene 1: A room in Weatherwise's house

Lady Goldenfleece is dining at Weatherwise's home with her suitors, Weatherwise, Sir Gilbert Lambston, Master Pepperton and Master Overdone. The suitors compete for Lady Goldenfleece's attention. Weatherwise is obsessed with almanacs, calendars, phases of the moon, the zodiac, etc. Lambston is the most aggressive suitor: he gives Lady Goldenfleece a big kiss in front of everyone. Pepperton and Overdone secretly agree to work together against Lambston.

Mistress Low-water enters, disguised as a 'Gallant Gentleman'; her husband, Master Low-water, poses as her servant. Lady Goldenfleece is immediately attracted to the 'Gallant Gentleman'. The 'Gallant Gentleman' calls Sir Gilbert a villain and gives Lady Goldenfleece the letter in which Sir Gilbert offered to pay Mistress Low-water to become his mistress. Lady Goldenfleece is shocked, and throws Sir Gilbert out. The other suitors are pleased to see Sir Gilbert eliminated.

Scene 2: The street outside Sir Oliver Twilight's house

Sandfield, Philip and Savourwit worry about what might happen to them now that their scheme has been discovered. Philip attempts to commit suicide, but Savourwit and Sandfield stop him.

Lady Twilight, Philip's mother, enters. She has recently been rescued from captivity by the scholar, Beveril, who accompanies her. Philip greets his mother warmly and thanks Beveril for rescuing his mother. Beveril, who happens to be Mistress Low-water's brother, asks Philip how his sister is doing. Philip regretfully informs him of the Low-waters' recent misfortune.

On Savourwit's advice, Philip takes his mother aside, and confesses how he faked her death and spent the ransom. After Lady Twilight agrees to forgive his transgressions, he begs her to pretend that Grace is actually his sister. Lady Twilight agrees to protect her son.

Scene 3: A room in Lady Goldenfleece's house

Mistress Low-water and her husband, still disguised as a Gallant Gentleman and his servant, are at Lady Goldenfleece's house, waiting for an interview with her. Lady Goldenfleece's suitors, Weatherwise, Pepperton and Overdone arrive, and the 'Gallant Gentleman' scolds 'his' 'Servant' loudly, acting as though 'he' is now the lord of the house. The suitors assume that the 'Gallant Gentleman' has married Lady Goldenfleece under their noses. They exit, disappointed.

Lady Goldenfleece enters and apologizes for making the 'Gallant Gentleman' wait. After a good deal of heated flirting, the 'Gallant Gentleman' promises Lady Goldenfleece that he has never slept with or courted any other woman (these oaths are, of course, ironically true). Lady Goldenfleece is swept off her feet. They kiss.

Weatherwise, Pepperton and Overdone enter with renewed hopes: a servant has told them that Lady Goldenfleece and the Gentleman haven't married yet. Lady Goldenfleece is not happy to see the suitors. To get rid of them, she kisses the 'Gallant Gentleman', announces her intention to marry him, and exits. The suitors exit.

The 'Gallant Gentleman' asks Lady Goldenfleece's clown, Pickadillie, if he knows of anyone who can write an entertainment for the wedding. Pickadillie suggests the scholar Beveril. Mistress Low-water is overjoyed to see her brother, but remains in characters as the 'Gallant Gentleman.' Beveril says he cannot compose an entertainment for the wedding because Lady Goldenfleece has wronged his sister. The 'Gallant Gentleman' encourages Beveril to withhold judgment until he has made Lady Goldenfleece's acquaintance. Lady Goldenfleece enters. Lady Goldenfleece and Beveril are immediately attracted to each other.

=== Act III ===
Scene 1: A street near Lady Goldenfleece's house

Weatherwise, Pepperton and Overdone meet Sir Gilbert Lambston on the street and tell him about Lady Goldenfleece's engagement. They all vow to find some way to disgrace Lady Goldenfleece. Pickadillie enters and tells the suitors that Beveril has been contracted to compose an entertainment for Lady Goldenfleece's wedding.

Beveril enters. Speaking to himself, he says is having trouble composing the entertainment because he has fallen madly in love with Lady Goldenfleece. The suitors introduce themselves to Beveril and volunteer to perform in the wedding entertainment. Beveril suggests that they play Earth, Air, Fire and Water. The suitors exit, making plans to 'poison' the entertainment and disgrace Lady Goldenfleece.

Mistress Low-water and her husband enter, still disguised as the 'Gallant Gentleman' and 'Servant', and overhear Beveril declaring his secret love for Lady Goldenfleece. Mistress Low-water is quite pleased. She says that she will work to bring her brother and Lady Goldenfleece together.

=== Act IV ===
Scene 1: A room in Sir Oliver Twilight's house

Sir Oliver says he is very happy to have his wife back. He thanks Beveril for rescuing her and scolds Philip and Savourwit for faking her death. Lady Twilight says that rumors of her death were circulating during Philip and Savourwit's time in Jersey (a lie) and begs Sir Oliver to excuse them because the whole mix-up was obviously a misunderstanding, not a scheme.

Sir Oliver raises the matter of the 'minion' (Grace) that Philip and Savourwit brought home to pass off as the Twilights' daughter. Lady Twilight says that she will be able to recognize her true daughter immediately because she has seen her several times since the kidnapping (another lie). Grace is brought in. Feigning jubilation, Lady Twilight says that Grace is definitely her daughter. Sir Oliver apologizes to Philip and Savourwit and admits them back into his good graces. With all the problems out of the way, he continues to make plans to marry Grace to Sandfield and Philip to Jane. Everyone exits except Lady Twilight, Grace, Philip and Savourwit.

Lady Twilight notes that there is something peculiarly familiar about Grace's face, and asks who Grace's mother was. Grace says she doesn't know: she and her mother were kidnapped by Dunkirks and separated ten years ago; all she knows is that her mother was an English gentlewoman. Lady Twilight realizes that Grace is her true daughter; in fact, she is wearing an earring that Lady Twilight gave her when she was a baby. Philip is horrified to learn that he has been sleeping with his sister. Lady Twilight tells Philip that his sin of incest was committed in ignorance, so it can be forgiven. Lady Twilight and Grace exit.

Lamenting his ill-fortune, Philip says good-bye to Savourwit and says he is leaving home forever. Savourwit convinces him to stick around long enough to see Lady Goldenfleece's wedding.

Scene 2: A room in Lady Goldenfleece's house

Pickadillie observes as servants make preparations for Lady Goldenfleece's wedding.

Scene 3: A room in Lady Goldenfleece's house

Music plays. Lady Goldenfleece and the 'Gallant Gentleman,' now married, enter arm-in-arm. Sir Oliver Twilight, Master Sunset, the Dutch Merchant, Lady Twilight, Grace, Jane Sunset, Philip, Savourwit, Master Sandfield and Master Low-water (disguised as a servant) follow. Master Low-water tells his wife that Beveril is still deeply infatuated with Lady Goldenfleece. Mistress Low-water asks him if he has prepared 'the letter'. Master Low-water says he has.

Beveril enters to introduce the entertainment. The entertainment begins. Lady Goldenfleece's former suitors enter, dressed as 'Fire' (Sir Gilbert Lambston), 'Air' (Weatherwise), 'Water' (Overdone) and 'Earth' (Pepperton). Rather than reciting the parts Beveril has composed, each suitor recites a speech insulting Lady Goldenfleece. When the entertainment is finished, the suitors reveal their true identities and exit, satisfied that they have fulfilled their vow to see Lady Goldenfleece disgraced. Beveril apologizes for the fiasco. Lady Goldenfleece forgives him. Lady Goldenfleece says good night to the wedding guests, who will spend the night at her house.

=== Act V ===
Scene 1: A room in Lady Goldenfleece's house

Lady Goldenfleece urges her new 'husband', to come to bed. 'He' resists her, claiming that 'he' cannot enjoy his marriage because 'he' knows that Lady Goldenfleece's fortune was wrongfully acquired. Lady Goldenfleece begs 'him' to reconsider, but 'he' will not relent. She exits with a heavy heart.

Master Low-water enters and tells his wife that he has delivered the letter she wrote to Beveril. Beveril enters on the balcony, reading the letter aloud. The letter is supposedly from Lady Goldenfleece, but was actually written by Lady Low-water. In the letter, 'Lady Goldenfleece' tells Beveril that she is already disappointed in her marriage because the 'Gallant Gentleman' has forsaken her bed without cause. She begs Beveril to come to her chamber to counsel her. Delighted, Beveril exits, on his way to Lady Goldenfleece's chamber.

Sir Oliver Twilight, Lady Twilight, Master Sunset, Grace, Philip, Sandfield, Jane, the Dutch Merchant and Savourwit enter. The 'Gallant Gentleman' tells them that he has heard strange noises coming from Lady Goldenfleece's bedroom and suspects that she is cheating on him on the night of their wedding. The door to Lady Goldenfleece's chamber is forced open. Lady Goldenfleece is discovered inside with Beveril. Feigning rage, the 'Gallant Gentleman' swears that he will never admit Lady Goldenfleece to his bed for as long as he lives, banishes her from the house and claims all of her wealth as his own.

Following pleas for leniency from Sir Oliver, the 'Gallant Gentleman' eventually agrees to leave with a casket containing half of all Lady Goldenfleece's wealth. As he prepares to leave, the 'Gallant Gentleman' says that, if 'he' wanted to, 'he' could release Lady Goldenfleece from her marriage contract with a few words, thus leaving her free to remarry. Everyone present wonders how this could be possible. Lady Goldenfleece begs the 'Gallant Gentleman' to tell her how she can regain her freedom. The 'Gallant Gentleman' says 'he' will only tell her if she promises to remarry immediately. Lady Goldenfleece promises.

The 'Gallant Gentleman' reveals that Goldenfleece's marriage contract is void because 'he' is already married! Lady Goldenfleece is shocked. In order to honor her promise to remarry immediately, and to spite the 'Gallant Gentleman', she announces that her next husband will be Beveril. The 'Gallant Gentleman' feigns torment. Sir Gilbert, Sir Oliver and Beveril note that the 'Gallant Gentleman's' days are numbered; the punishment for having two wives is hanging. The 'Gallant Gentleman' says that, although 'he' is already married, 'he' does not have two wives. To provide the solution to this riddle, 'he' reveals 'his' true identity as Mistress Low-water.

Sir Oliver decides that it is now time to draw up the marriage contracts for Sandfield & Grace and Philip & Jane. Lady Goldenfleece protests that Jane cannot marry Philip because she is, in fact, his sister! While everyone wonders what is going on, Lady Goldenfleece explains that Lady Sunset switched the girls when they were infants because she was worried that her husband would go bankrupt. Philip is overjoyed: the woman he is married to is Sunset's daughter, and not a relation of his. Sandfield is also overjoyed: he gets to marry Jane, the woman he really wanted to marry all along.

Epilogue

Weatherwise ends the play with an epilogue filled with characteristic references to almanacs and the phases of the moon. Consulting his almanac, he predicts that the play will end with great applause.
