= Susanna Mountfort =

British stage actress

Susanna Mountfort (1690-1720) was a British stage actress.

She was the daughter of the actors William Mountfort and his wife Susanna Mountfort. In 1692 her father was killed in a duel and her mother remarried and became known as Susanna Verbruggen. Her daughter took to the stage as a child actor in 1703, the year of her mother's death, and acted for many years at the Drury Lane Theatre appearing frequently in comedies as an ingénue. She also played Ophelia in Shakespeare's Hamlet.

== Selected roles ==
- Berynthia in An Act at Oxford by Thomas Baker (1704)
- Angelica in The Biter by Nicholas Rowe (1704)
- Valeria The Basset Table by Susanna Centlivre (1705)
- Rose in The Recruiting Officer by George Farquhar (1706)
- Florinda in The Wife of Bath by John Gay (1713)
- Charlotte in The Female Advocates by William Taverner (1713)
- Aurelia in The Apparition by Anonymous (1713)
- Flora in The Country Lasses by Charles Johnson (1715)
- Fidelia in The Play is the Plot by John Durant Breval (1718)

== Bibliography ==
- Goff, Moira. The Incomparable Hester Santlow: A Dancer-actress on the Georgian Stage. Ashgate, 2007.
- Milling, Jane (ed.). The Basset Table. Broadview Press, 2009.
