= Everybody Mistaken =

1716 play

- Written by: William Taverner
- Original language: English
- Genre: Comedy

Premiere
- Date premiered: 10 March 1716
- Place premiered: Lincoln's Inn Fields Theatre

Everybody Mistaken is a 1716 comedy play by the British writer William Taverner. The title is also written as Every Body Mistaken. A farce, it is a reworking of The Comedy of Errors by William Shakespeare.

It premiered at the Lincoln's Inn Fields Theatre in London on 10 March 1716, and was followed as an afterpiece by the masque Presumptuous Love, also by Taverner. It opened the same night as Joseph Addison's The Drummer debuted at the rival Drury Lane Theatre.

== Bibliography ==
- Burling, William J. A Checklist of New Plays and Entertainments on the London Stage, 1700-1737. Fairleigh Dickinson Univ Press, 1992.
- Miola, Robert S. The Comedy of Errors: Critical Essays. Routledge, 2013.
- Nicoll, Allardyce. History of English Drama, 1660-1900, Volume 2. Cambridge University Press, 2009.
- Van Lennep, W. The London Stage, 1660-1800: Volume Two, 1700-1729. Southern Illinois University Press, 1960.
