= The Fine Lady's Airs =

Play by Thomas Baker

- Original language: English
- Written by: Thomas Baker
- Genre: Comedy

Premiere
- Date: 14 December 1708
- Place: Theatre Royal, Drury Lane

The Fine Lady's Airs is a 1708 comedy play by the British writer Thomas Baker.

The original Drury Lane cast included John Mills as Sir Harry Sprightly, Robert Wilks as Brigadier Blenheim, Colley Cibber as Nicknack, Benjamin Johnson as Major Bramble, William Bullock as Master Totty, William Pinkethman as Knapsack, Henry Norris as Shrimp, George Pack as Orangewoman, Anne Oldfield as Lady Rodomont, Mary Porter as Lady Tossup, Lucretia Bradshaw and Margaret Saunders as Mrs Flimsy.

== Bibliography ==
- Burling, William J. A Checklist of New Plays and Entertainments on the London Stage, 1700-1737. Fairleigh Dickinson Univ Press, 1992.
- Nicoll, Allardyce. History of English Drama, 1660-1900, Volume 2. Cambridge University Press, 2009.
