= Leonard Welsted =

English poet

Leonard Welsted (baptised 3 June 1688 – August 1747) was an English poet and "dunce" in Alexander Pope's writings (both in The Dunciad and in Peri Bathos). Welsted was an accomplished writer who composed in a relaxed, light hearted vein. He was associated with Whig party political figures in his later years (the years in which he earned Pope's enmity), but he was tory earlier, and, in the age of patronage, this seems to have been more out of financial need than anything else.

He was the son of a Church of England priest and was orphaned at six. He attended Trinity College, Cambridge but left without a degree. He married Frances Purcell, the orphaned daughter of Henry Purcell, around 1707, and the couple had a daughter, also named Frances. However, the mother died in 1712, and Welsted married Anna Maria Walker, the sister of an admiral, that year. In his poetry, he referred to her as Zelinda. Frances Welsted, the daughter, died in 1726, seventeen years old, and Welsted mourned her loss in Hymn to the Creator the next year.

He wrote many poems in an attempt to get a position from patronage. He wrote two odes to John Churchill, 1st Duke of Marlborough in 1709 as well as an elegy to John Philips the poet. Nothing was forthcoming, however. In 1712, with the tories in power, he began to court the opposition whigs with laudatory verse. He also translated On the Sublime, although Jonathan Swift argued that he had translated Boileau's translation, and not Longinus's original. In 1714, Welsted attacked Robert Harley, the fallen head of the Tory party, with The Prophecy. Harley replied, and Harley's friends in the Scriblerus Club were thereafter Welsted's enemies.

Welsted continued to antagonize the Scribblerans. In 1717, he wrote Palaemon to Caelia, or, The Triumvirate, which was a satire of John Gay, Alexander Pope, and John Arbuthnot and their play Three Hours After Marriage. In 1724, he mocked one of Pope's lines from Essay on Criticism, and therefore Thomas Cooke made Welsted the champion who opposes Pope in his The Battel of the Poets.

When the Hanoverian succession occurred, Welsted benefited. He wrote An Epistle to Mr. Steele on the King's Accession, and he became Richard Steele's secretary or assistant. He contributed to Steele's and Ambrose Philips's respective newspapers in the coming years, and he wrote a prologue and epilogue to Steele's The Conscious Lovers of 1722. During that time he also continued to write poems with fawning dedications to various members of the nobility.

The wheedling paid off for Welsted, as he was made a clerk and received an annual salary of £25. In 1726, his play, The Dissembled Wanton, was acted at Lincoln's Inn Fields. It netted him £138 for the author's benefit and another £30 for the printed rights. He also attempted several subscriptions for translations that did not work out. One of his best poems, Oikographia, dates from 1725 and details his living in the Tower of London (but not the prison) and the simple pleasures of a contented life with a loving wife.

In 1728, Pope struck back against Welsted. In Peri Bathos, Welsted's obsequiousness is isolated and presented for derision, and in The Dunciad Pope accused him of writing poetry that flows like its inspiration: beer. In fact, Pope presented Welsted several places in The Dunciad as a laughable poetaster. Welsted attempted to fight back, and he teamed up with another of Pope's dunces, James Moore Smythe, for One Epistle to Mr. A. Pope in 1730, and in 1732 he wrote two attacks on Pope, Of Dulness and Scandal and Of False Fame. In return, Pope satirized Welsted again in the Epistle to Arbuthnot in 1735. Welsted was also satirized by Jonathan Swift. In Swift's 1733 On Poetry: A Rhapsody, he first compared Welsted's bad versifying with Stephen Duck's bad rhymes and then Welsted's "translation" of Longinus's Peri Hupsos, which was actually a translation of Boileau's French translation.

In 1730 and 1731, he was promoted in his civil service job, going to a salary of £70 and then one of £150 as a commissioner of the lottery. These promotions may have been due to the intercession of well-known politicians and leading whigs, such as Bishop Hoadley. His late works include a prose work of theodicy entitled The Scheme and Conduct of Providence in 1736, and the poem The Summum bonum, or, Wisest Philosophy, which again praises the simple joy of retired life.
