= The Apparition (play) =

1713 play

- Original language: English
- Written by: Anonymous
- Genre: Comedy

Premiere
- Date: 25 November 1713
- Place: Theatre Royal, Drury Lane, London

The Apparition: or, The Sham Wedding is a 1713 British comedy play written by an anonymous author.

It premiered at the Theatre Royal, Drury Lane in London. The original cast included Henry Norris as Sir Tristram Getall, William Bullock as Sir Thomas Etherside, John Bowman as Mendwell, Barton Booth as Welford, John Mills as Friendly, James Spiller as Foist, George Pack as Plotwell, Susanna Mountfort as Aurelia, Hester Santlow as Clarinda and Margaret Saunders as Buisy.

== Bibliography ==
- Burling, William J. A Checklist of New Plays and Entertainments on the London Stage, 1700-1737. Fairleigh Dickinson Univ Press, 1992.
- Nicoll, Allardyce. History of English Drama, 1660-1900, Volume 2. Cambridge University Press, 2009.
