= The Female Advocates =

Play by William Taverner

- Original language: English
- Written by: William Taverner
- Genre: Comedy

Premiere
- Date: 6 January 1713
- Place: Theatre Royal, Drury Lane, London

The Female Advocates is a 1713 comedy play by the British writer William Taverner. The longer title is The Female Advocates: or, the Frantic Stock-jobber.

The original Drury Lane cast featured William Bullock as Sir Charles Transfer, Henry Norris as Sir Feeble Dotard, Barton Booth as Captain Stanworth, John Mills as Heartly, John Bowman as Friendly, George Pack as Bite, James Spiller as Smart, Mary Porter as Mrs Freelove, Margaret Bicknell as Olivia, Elizabeth Spiller as Brush, Susanna Mountfort as Charlotte.

== Bibliography ==
- Burling, William J. A Checklist of New Plays and Entertainments on the London Stage, 1700-1737. Fairleigh Dickinson Univ Press, 1992.
- Nicoll, Allardyce. History of English Drama, 1660-1900, Volume 2. Cambridge University Press, 2009.
