= Jeremiah Taverner =

British painter

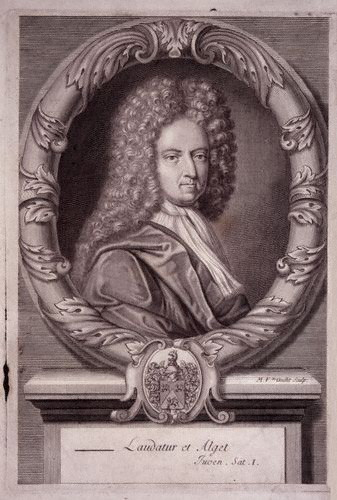
Daniel Defoe line engraving by Michael Vandergucht, after original painting by Jeremiah Taverner, National Portrait Gallery, London

Jeremiah Taverner (active 1690–1706) was a British portrait painter.

Not much is known about Taverner except through his works. He painted primarily portraits, and a number of them were used to produce engravings done by other artists. A number of these works can be found at the National Portrait Gallery, London. He was the father of William Taverner, a lawyer; and grandfather of William Taverner, b. 1703, a judge and watercolourist.
