= Margaret Saunders =

British actress

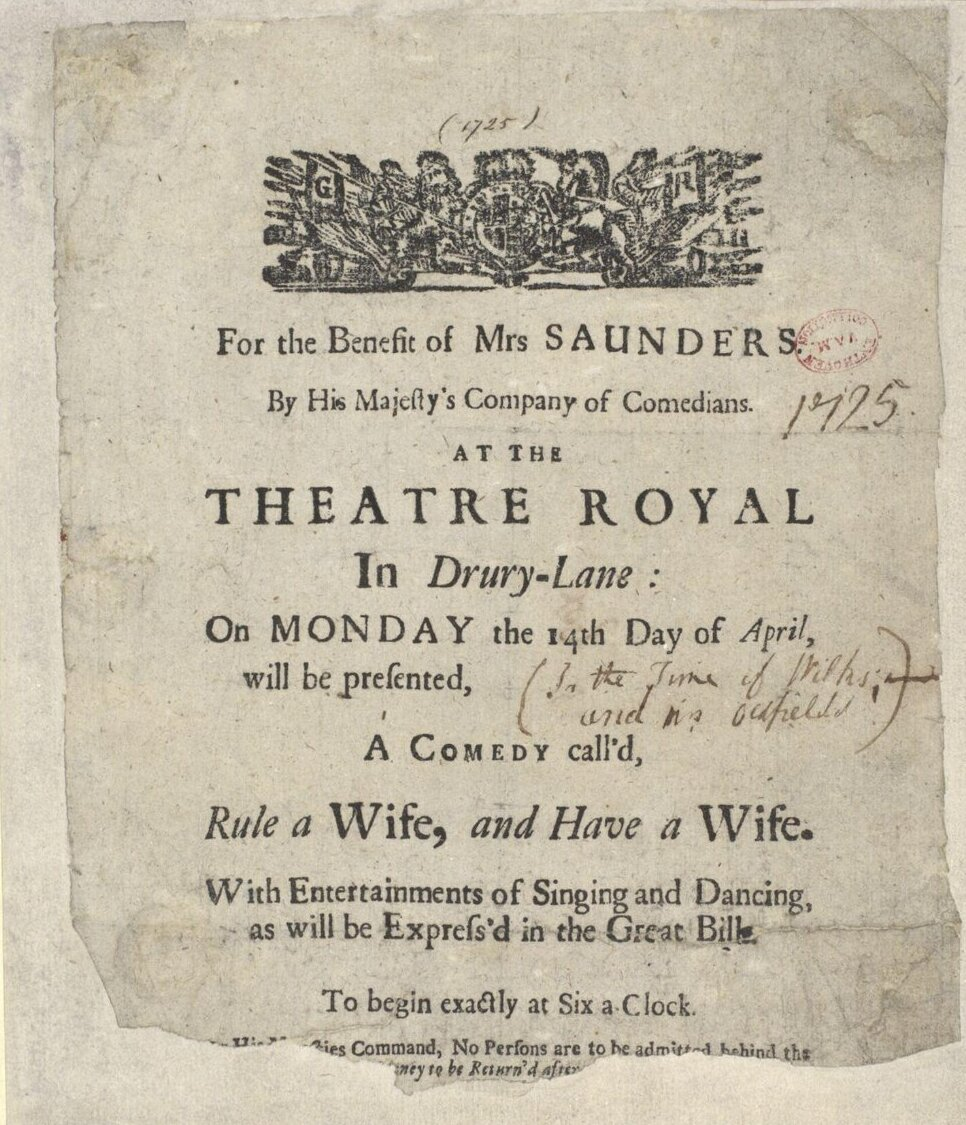
- 1721 benefit performance
- Born: 1686; Weymouth
- Died: 1745 (aged 58–59); London

Margaret Saunders or Mrs Saunders (1686–1745) was a British actress.

== Life ==
Saunders was born in Weymouth where her father Jonathon Saunders made wine barrels. Her mother's family were called Wallis and her maternal grandfather was a naval officer. She attended a boarding school at Steeple Ashton in Wiltshire before being apprenticed to Mrs Fane who was a milliner in the Strand. At the age of sixteen she began her acting career at Drury Lane Theatre due to an introduction by her lifelong friend Anne Oldfield.

In 1708 and 1709 she was billed as "Mrs Saunders" for her performances at Drury Lane. but it appears that she never married. Saunders appeared in many significant roles and she was well known for playing nurse maids. She earned a salary of fifty pounds a year as a member of the Drury Lane company from 1710.

Anne Oldfield died from cancer in October 1730 after a successful career. She was buried in Westminster Abbey. Saunders had lived with her from 1720 and she cared for her during her illness. She was left an annuity that was worth ten pounds a year. There is no record of Saunders acting except in 1743 when she appeared in a benefit performance for Mrs Younger of The Way of the World where she played Lady Wishfort. In 1744 there was a benefit performance for Saunders and in the following year her will was read.

== Selected roles ==
- Wishwell in The Double Gallant by Colley Cibber (1707)
- Mrs Flimsy in The Fine Lady's Airs by Thomas Baker (1708)
- Patch in The Busie Body by Susanna Centlivre (1709)
- Dorothy in The Man's Bewitched by Susanna Centlivre (1709)
- Buisy in The Apparition by Anonymous (1713)
- Abigail in The Drummer by Joseph Addison (1716)
- Prudentia in The Play is the Plot by John Durant Breval (1718)
