= The Play is the Plot =

1718 play

- Original language: English
- Written by: John Durant Breval
- Genre: Comedy

Premiere
- Date: 19 February 1718
- Place: Theatre Royal, Drury Lane

The Play is the Plot is a 1718 comedy play by the British writer John Durant Breval.

Originally staged at the Drury Lane Theatre the cast featured Benjamin Johnson as Sir Barnaby Bindover, Thomas Walker as Captain Carbine, William Pinkethman as Colonel Ringwood, Henry Norris as Buskin, William Bowen as Truncheon, Colley Cibber as Peter Pirate, James Oates as Jeremy, Joe Miller as Machone, Margaret Saunders as Prudentia and Susanna Mountfort as Fidelia.

In 1723 Breval rewrote his work as an afterpiece retitled The Strollers which enjoyed considerable success.

== Bibliography ==
- Burling, William J. A Checklist of New Plays and Entertainments on the London Stage, 1700-1737. Fairleigh Dickinson Univ Press, 1992.
- Nicoll, Allardyce. History of English Drama, 1660-1900, Volume 2. Cambridge University Press, 2009.
