= Bretnor =

Bretnor may refer to:

- Reginald Bretnor (1911–1992), science fiction author
- Thomas Bretnor, almanac maker
- Bretnor Apartments, a historic apartment block in Portland, Oregon
