= The Conscious Lovers =

Play written by Richard Steele

- Original language: English
- Written by: Richard Steele
- Genre: Comedy

Premiere
- Date: 7 November 1722
- Place: Theatre Royal, Drury Lane

The Conscious Lovers is a sentimental comedy written in five acts by the Irish author Richard Steele. The Conscious Lovers appeared on stage on 7 November 1722, at Theatre Royal, Drury Lane and was an immediate success, with an initial run of eighteen consecutive nights.

The original Drury Lane cast included John Mills as Sir John Bevil, Robert Wilks as Mrytle, Barton Booth as Bevil Junior, Benjamin Griffin as Cimberton, Colley Cibber as Tom, Theophilus Cibber as Daniel, Sarah Thurmond as Isabella, Anne Oldfield as Indiana, Hester Santlow as Lucinda and Elizabeth Younger as Phyllis. The prologue and epilogue were written by Leonard Welsted.

== Character list ==
Men

- Sir John Bevil
- Mr. Sealand
- Bevil Junior, in love with Indiana but betrothed to Lucinda
- Myrtle, in love with Lucinda
- Cimberton, a coxcomb
- Humphrey, an old servant to Sir John
- Tom, servant to Bevil Junior
- Daniel, a country boy, servant to Indiana

Women

- Mrs. Sealand, second wife to Sealand
- Isabella, sister to Sealand
- Indiana, Sealand's daughter by his first wife
- Lucinda, Sealand's daughter by his second wife
- Phillis, maid to Lucinda

Colley Cibber played Tom in original 1722 production.

== Plot ==
The preface to the play, written by Leonard Welsted, asserts that the play is departing from popular comedies of the day and impresses upon the audience the primacy of morality and manners over lewd jokes and licentious behavior.

In the play, Sir John Bevil is encouraging his son, Bevil Jr., to marry the wealthy Lucinda, daughter of Mr. Sealand. John Bevil was quite the rake in his day, and he is trying to encourage his son to settle down with a wife and start a family. Bevil Jr., however, is faced with a dilemma, for though he is set to marry Lucinda, he is not in love with her, but his good friend Myrtle is. Bevil Jr. is in love with Indiana, a poor woman whose mother died when Indiana was seven. Indiana has been raised by her Aunt Isabella (Mr. Sealand's sister). She is the daughter of Mr. Sealand by his first wife, though no one realizes it.

Mr. Sealand is intent on marrying his daughter Lucinda to Bevil Jr., but Mrs. Sealand, Mr. Sealand's second wife and Lucinda's mother, is intent on her marrying the young coxcomb Cimberton, because of his vast fortune and also because he is Mrs. Sealand's cousin. However, because of his fortune, Cimberton cannot marry without the consent of his Uncle Geoffrey or his counsel of lawyers. So Bevil Jr. and Myrtle devise a scheme where Myrtle and Bevil Jr.'s servant, Tom, will disguise themselves as Sir Geoffrey's lawyers, Bramble and Target, in order to delay the wedding proceedings. They arrive at Mr. Sealand's house in disguise, and convince Cimberton and Mrs. Sealand that the marriage absolutely cannot proceed without Sir Geoffrey's physical presence to sign away part of the estate. In the meantime, Sir John and Mr. Sealand discuss Bevil Jr.'s morals, for it has been discovered that he has been visiting a woman of lower class on a frequent basis. Mr. Sealand decides to go and visit this young woman so that he may judge Bevil Jr.'s moral conduct for himself, and Sir John and his servant Humphrey discuss the implication of marrying his son off as a bargaining chip to double the estate rather than letting Bevil Jr. choose a wife of his own.

The next day, Phillis, Lucinda's maid, arrives at Bevil Jr.'s lodgings with news that Sir Geoffrey is expected in town at any moment, and suggests that Myrtle disguise himself as Sir Geoffrey in order to further delay the marriage proceedings. Myrtle arrives at Mr. Sealand's house disguised at Sir Geoffrey. Mrs. Sealand is in a hurry to marry Lucinda to Cimberton while her husband is away, she begins proceedings for a wedding. When Mr. Sealand arrives at Isabella and Indiana's lodgings, Isabella recognizes him, but he does not recognize her. He talks to Indiana, listens to her sad story, and while she is in a crying fit she drops a bracelet on the floor, and Mr. Sealand recognizes it as the bracelet he gave his first wife just before they were separated. Mr. Sealand is happy to be reunited with his daughter and sister, and in this moment insists that Indiana marry Bevil Jr. Isabella leaves that instant to get Bevil Jr. and arrives with Sir John Bevil, Bevil Jr., Mrs. Sealand, Cimberton, Myrtle disguised as Sir Geoffrey, and Lucinda. In this final scene, Mr. Sealand says he would rather have Myrtle marry Lucinda because he never liked Cimberton, and Cimberton will not marry Lucinda because her dowry has just been halved by Mr. Sealand's discovery of his long-lost daughter Indiana. He leaves, and Myrtle reveals himself. In the end, the moral of the story, given by Sir John, is that the happiness of the young is provided by good virtue, honesty and "Providence."

== Roman origins ==
Sir Richard Steele considered himself an innovator and an educator in 18th-century England, working to replace the lewd comedies of the Restoration era with a new type of drama that would be more effective in providing moral education for the public. Steele's innovation in this play comes from strategically implemented changes to the traditional Greek and Roman theories of comedy. The Conscious Lovers is a very loose adaptation of Terence's Andria, or The Woman of Andros, itself a translation of an older Greek play. Many other 18th-century playwrights created adaptations of ancient Roman plays, particularly favoring the works of Plautus and Terence. Steele knew that his audience would be familiar with the Roman source, as Terence's plays were in heavy circulation during this time, being published in hundreds of editions between 1700 and 1800. These adaptations were an attempt among playwrights to lend a type of legitimacy and authority to the contemporary theater by drawing from a body of familiar classical stories.Steele was also aware that comparisons would be made between his adaptation and the original.

The seriousness of Terence was noted by many contemporaries to be one important element of traditional tragedy that Steele incorporated into his revised version of comedy, known today as sentimental comedy. Steele considered Terence's serious tone, and the different effect it produces on the viewing audience from the more light-hearted comedy of the era, to be an essential component in the function of his new dramatic form as a "radical correction to the libidinous exuberance of Restoration comedy". Some critics have suggested that deeper parallels to the Romans are deliberately constructed into the play. Rather than simply adopting the emotional tone of classical works, it has been argued that Steele idealizes the Roman empire as a model for the developing British empire. In this reading, the goal of his new dramatic style is for the audience to throw off the barbarous traditions of the past, both theatrical and political, and become more like the civilized Romans. By drawing from the classical dramatic tradition and refining its models, Steele hoped that he could refine British culture in the same way that his journalistic publications provided readers with moral guidance. The Conscious Lovers builds on the history of drama while attempting to eschew contemporary principles of morality and theatricality to create new sets of values.

== The innovation of sentimental comedy ==
The new values of Steele's "sentimental comedy" are expressed in The Conscious Lovers by two significant innovations to Restoration drama. One of these innovations is a new conception of social morality that values restrained passion and patient reflection over bold, contentious behavior. The play marks an attempt by Steele to distinctly separate his work from the moral baseness of the comedies that preceded it. He claimed in the preface that the whole play was written around the scene in act 4 where Bevil Junior overcomes his passions and thus avoids a duel with his friend Myrtle. The ethics of dueling was an issue of debate in the public sphere during this time, including other publications by Steele himself. However, critics analyzing the history and development of sentimental comedy have found Steele's self-professed key scene to be about more than disapproval of the evil and waste of human life that results from dueling. Steele's assertion in the preface suggests that the play's purpose is not only to move the audience by depicting scenes of emotional distress , but also to provide a model for more restrained and refined behavior in the emerging English middle class. The play argues that the greatest rewards are reaped by those who maintain the virtue of patience. Bevil Junior and his indifferent restraint represent an ideal of peaceable behavior in sharp contrast to the British theatrical norm of aggressive masculinity and assertiveness. The Conscious Lovers offers a new system of morals, one that can guide the nation into the future and protect its integrity under the weight of the growing empire. In another major innovation, the classical theory of comedy is altered by making the protagonist a positive, exemplary hero rather than a negative example of how not to behave.

Steele also claimed in the preface to The Conscious Lovers that the play had a particular and deliberate purpose to be an "Example and Precept" to the audience. By providing paragons of upstanding and righteous character, Steele wanted sentimental comedy to be a source of role models that the public could embrace and emulate. As the ridiculousness of comedic protagonists is stripped away, so is much of the lightheartedness and wit of Restoration comedies. The Conscious Lovers, while not humorless, replaces laughter with a serious attitude and a new set of comedic values. The fops and the rakes of the previous era are made relics, costumes that are to be ridiculed in public, as is Bevil's father when he attends the masquerade. Formally, the new sentimental comedy "tends to the monumental, both in plot details and dialogue". Characters speak in "sentiments", or pithy moral statements of high theatricality that bear greater resemblance to tragedy than to the older comedies. These sentiments were easily quotable, widely circulated and often republished in collections.

The ideal of reform and social critique in The Conscious Lovers functions similarly to Steele's work in periodicals like the Spectator, the Tatler, and the Guardian. Steele was able to compound the moral authority he commanded from adapting a traditional Roman play with the recognition he already possessed as a cultural critic from these journalistic works in order to establish this new type of drama.

== Analysis ==
The dynamic triangle of parents and children in The Conscious Lovers highlights a temporary shift in English polite society from marriage contracts executed as business deals to marriage as an act of love between two people, with limited input from the parents. In his book The Family, Sex, and Marriage in England, 1500-1800 Lawrence Stone says that the enhanced dowries which accompanied brides leading into the mid-18th century put the wife in a more powerful position than she had ever been in before. And as more marriages deteriorated because of a lack of affection between the husband and wife, many younger people coming of age in mid-18th century England started seeing marriage as a contract between friends where both partners were equals, rather than a business contract which ultimately left the wife as little more than the husband's personal servant.

Steele's The Conscious Lovers also hinges upon his young hero avoiding fighting a duel. These plays set up a new set of values for the stage. Instead of simply amusing or inspiring the audience, they sought to instruct and ennoble the audience.

== Contemporary reception ==
The Conscious Lovers received a mixed reception during its initial run. It was extremely popular after its debut, and was highly anticipated even before its first performance. The play ran for eighteen consecutive nights, and received many revivals during the 18th century. It made more money than any other play performed at Drury Lane up until that time. The public largely did respond to the play in the way that Steele had intended. However, despite Steele's claims about the importance of the scene where the duel is averted by Bevil's moment of composed reflection, critics disagree about whether or not audiences received this scene in the way that Steele intended. Some have agreed that Steele's comments in the preface are instructive and that the duel in act 4 provides the centerpiece of the action. Others have suggested that the play is constructed to build up dramatic tension to the final discovery scene.

Many readers have found the end of the play to be the pivotal point of the drama rather than the narrowly averted duel. In fact, 18th-century audiences reacted much more strongly to Indiana's reuniting with her long-lost father than any other part of the plot. This was the moment that consistently evoked strong sentimental emotions, even among Steele's contemporary critics.One of those critics, John Dennis, was widely known for his dislike of Steele and the Drury Lane theater. Dennis wrote a scathing review of The Conscious Lovers the week before its debut performance, but the critique had little effect on the play's popularity. He strongly disapproved of what he perceived to be Steele's attempt to market bad entertainment as a commercial enterprise. Dennis especially regarded Steele's departure from the traditions of comedic theater as distasteful. He considered the British comedy to be the greatest in all the theaters of Europe, in terms of both moral education and entertainment. To him and other critics of his time, The Conscious Lovers did not even feel like a comedy. Steele's innovations in sentimental comedy were intended to incorporate elements of tragedy, but for Dennis, the play was too "tragical". Mixing emotional responses by evoking sadness at the end of the play was considered a violation of the principle that comedy and tragedy were supposed to be separate entities, each consistent in tone and in the feelings they produced in the audience.

Satire was another element Dennis felt was lacking in The Conscious Lovers' new brand of comedy. Satire was the traditional method by which British comedy was expected to produce moral reflection in the audience. With the exception of Cimberton, Steele's characters were not ignoble enough to function as instructive objects of satire. He could not accept the behavior of the protagonist, who he found to be neither entertaining nor a benchmark for morality. Bevil Junior's regularity and upstanding ethics did not allow the accustomed sense of ridicule to develop, and therefore the action of comedy was disrupted. Dennis also considered the characterizations too improbable, and their actions or inactions too unlikely, which detracted from the unity of the structure. In his mind, the sentimental comedy incorporated too much catharsis, while The Conscious Lovers and its followers favored a positive, exemplary hero as a moral beacon. Steele recognized that not everybody in the audience would approve of his changes and the contrivances he employed to deliver them, but also believed that these older definitions were too narrow and excluded sufficient conditions that allowed comedy to be a vehicle of reform. These departures from the comedic tradition marked Steele as an iconoclast in the eyes of his contemporaries, but they also earned him the distinction of an innovator in British drama.

== Editions ==
- Steele, Richard The Conscious Lovers (Nebraska: University of Nebraska Press, 1968) ISBN 0-8032-5369-9. Edited with an introduction and notes by Shirley Strum Kenny.
