= Mary Steele =

Second wife of Sir Richard Steele (1678 – 1718)

Mary, Lady Steele (née Scurlock; November 1678 – 26 December 1718) was the second wife of Sir Richard Steele, whom she married in 1707.

== Heiress to an estate ==
She was born in Carmarthen, the only child of Jonathan Scurlock, Sheriff of Carmarthen. She inherited the family's Llangunnor estate, where Steele retired a few years before his death in 1729.

== Correspondence ==
The correspondence between Richard Steele and his wife, whom he nicknamed "Prue" (because of her frugality), is famous. They are believed to have met in 1706, at the funeral of his first wife, Margaret, and married in the following year. Prior to this, in February 1704, Mary had been unsuccessfully sued for breach of promise by a man named Henry Owen, whom she accused of being a fortune-hunter.

== Life in London ==
Following their marriage, they took up residence in London, but Steele's precarious financial position made it difficult for them to keep up the rent and they were forced to move to properties in less fashionable districts or to use houses that belonged to the Scurlock family. Over the period of twelve years until her death, Steele wrote over 400 letters to Prue. However, the marriage was a stormy one, and for much of it, Steele was in London and Mary in Wales.

== Death and burial ==
By the time of her death, she was seriously considering a permanent separation because Steele drank heavily and was constantly in debt. On her death at the age of forty, Mary was buried at Westminster Abbey; her husband would be buried in Carmarthen.

== Heiress ==
The Scurlock family property passed in due course to the only surviving Steele child (of the Steele's four children), Elizabeth, who married John Trevor, 3rd Baron Trevor. She was the only surviving one of their four children.
