= Sentimental comedy =

18th century English dramatic genre

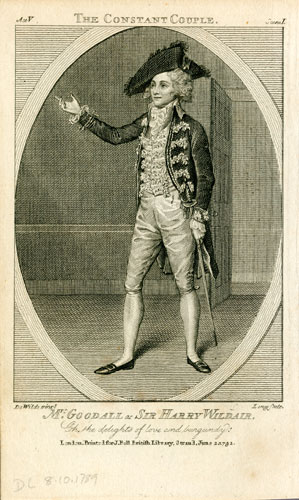
Charlotte Goodall as Sir Harry Wildair in The ConstanCouple

Sentimental comedy is an 18th-century dramatic genre which sprang up as a reaction to the immoral tone of English Restoration plays. In sentimental comedies, middle-class protagonists triumphantly overcome a series of moral trials. These plays aimed to produce tears rather than laughter and reflected contemporary philosophical conceptions of humans as inherently good but capable of being led astray by bad example. By appealing to his noble sentiments, a man could be reformed and set back on the path of virtue. Although the plays contained characters whose natures seemed overly virtuous and whose problems were too easily resolved, they were accepted by audiences as truthful representations of the human predicament.

== Elements of the genre ==
The characters in sentimental comedy are either strictly good or bad. Heroes have no faults or bad habits, villains are thoroughly evil or morally degraded. The authors' purpose was to show the audience the innate goodness of people and that through morality people who have been led astray can find the path of righteousness.

The plot usually centered on the domestic trials of middle-class couples and included romantic love scenes. Their private woes are exhibited with much emotional stress intended to arouse the spectator’s pity and suspense in advance of the approaching happy ending. Lovers are often shown separated from each other by socioeconomic factors at the beginning, but brought together in the end by a discovery about the identity of the lower class lover. Plots also contained an element of mystery to be solved. Verse was not used in order to create a closer illusion of reality. It was thought that rhyme would obscure the true meaning of the words and make the truth disappear.

The playwrights of this genre aimed to bring the audience to tears, not laughter, as the name sentimental comedy might suggest. They believed that noisy laughter inhibited the silent sympathy and thought of the audience. Playwrights strove to touch the feelings of the spectators so that they could learn from the play and relate the events they witnessed on stage to their own lives, causing them to live more virtuously.

== Major works ==
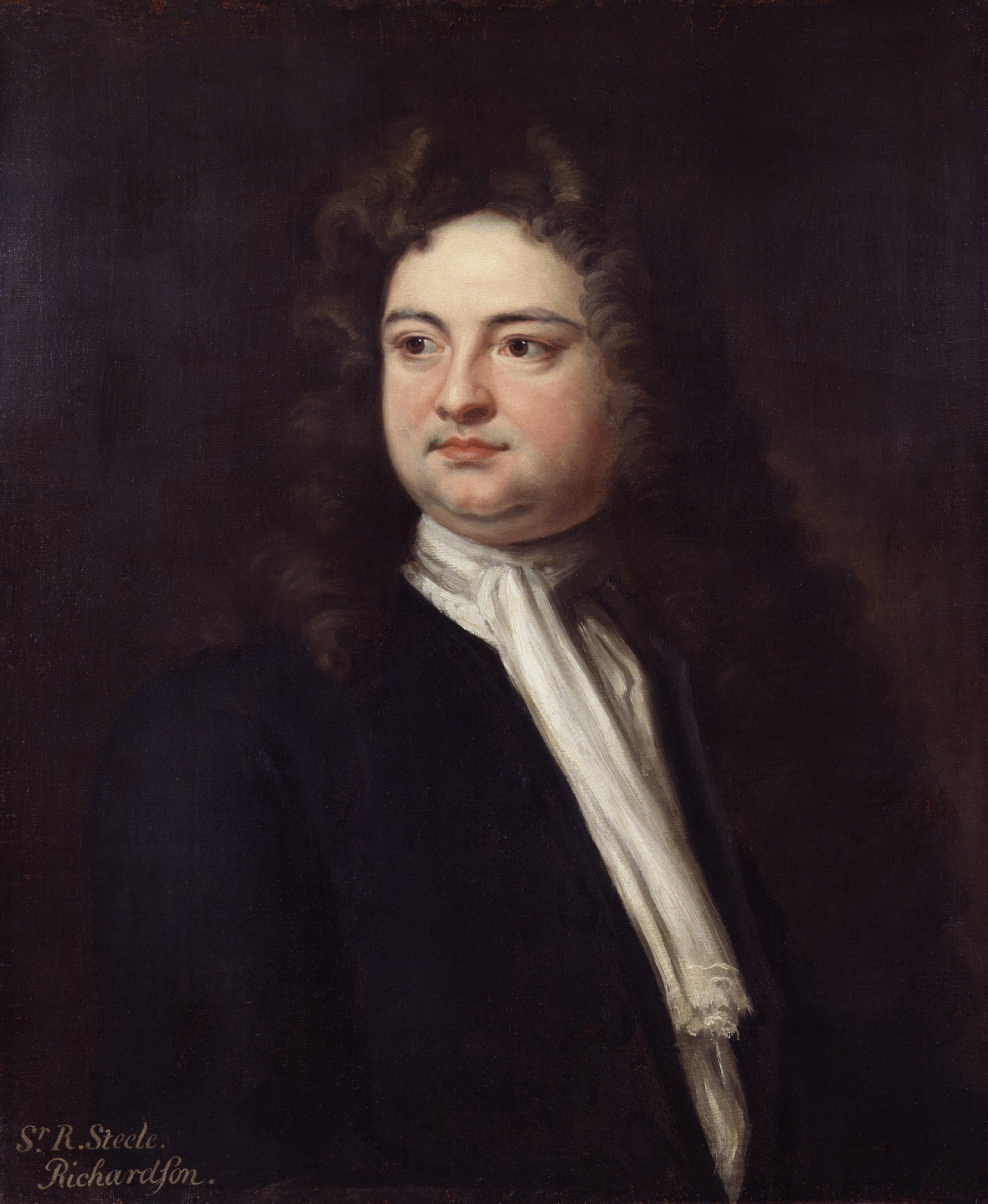
Richard Steele

The best known work of this genre is Sir Richard Steele's The Conscious Lovers (1722), in which the penniless heroine Indiana faces various tests until the discovery that she is an heiress leads to the necessary happy ending. Steele wished his plays to bring the audience, "a pleasure too exquisite for laughter." Steele was an Irish writer and politician, remembered mainly for co-founding the magazine The Spectator. While he wrote a few notable sentimental comedies, he was criticized for being a hypocrite as he wrote moral plays, booklets, and articles but enjoyed drinking, occasional dueling, and debauchery around town.

Scholars argue whether a more important writer of the genre was Colley Cibber, an actor-manager, writer, and poet laureate who wrote the first sentimental comedy, Love's Last Shift, in order to give himself a role. The play did establish him as both an actor and a playwright, and though some of his 25 plays were praised, his political adaptations of well-known works met with much criticism.

Neither Steele nor Colley, or any other writer, made a career of writing sentimental comedies as the genre was popular for only a short time. In fact, all of the authors of sentimental comedy at this time wrote other forms, including restoration comedy and tragedy. Sentimental comedies continued to coexist with more conventional laughing comedies such as Oliver Goldsmith's She Stoops to Conquer (1773) and Richard Brinsley Sheridan's The Rivals (1775) until the sentimental genre waned in the early 19th century.

=== Sentimental comedies ===
- Love's Last Shift by Colley Cibber (1696)
- The Constant Couple by George Farquhar (1699)
- The Lying Lover by Richard Steele (1703)
- The Tender Husband by Richard Steele (1705)
- The Conscious Lovers by Richard Steele (1722)
- The Foundling by Edward Moore (1748)
- The School for Lovers by William Whitehead (1762)
- Le Préjugé à la mode by Pierre-Claude Nivelle de La Chaussée (1735) – a good example of the French genre similar to sentimental comedy, comédie larmoyante

== Significant environmental factors ==
Sentimental comedy was a reaction to the bawdy restoration comedy of the 17th and 18th centuries. Many believed that the sexually explicit behavior encouraged by Charles II on the stage led to the demoralization of the English population outside the theater. Many felt that restoration comedies, which started out ridiculing vice, appeared to support vice instead therefore becoming one of the leading causes of moral corruption. One of the leading environmental factors that made way for this new genre was Jeremy Collier's Short View of the Immorality and Profaneness of the English Stage, published in 1698. This essay signaled the public opposition to the supposed improprieties of plays staged during the previous three decades. Collier convincingly argued that the, "business of plays is to recommend Vertue, and discountenance Vice". Other sentimentalists took on the responsibility to moralize the stage in hopes of repairing the perceived damage of restoration comedies. These playwrights and theoreticians used the theater to instruct rather than delight after puritan opposition to theater grew from 1660 to 1698.

At the opening night of Cibber's Love's Last Shift at Dury Lane Theater in January 1696 spectators experienced a new genre. They were genuinely surprised by the unexpected reconciliation and the joy of seeing this, "spread such an uncommon rapture of pleasure in the audience that never were spectators more happy in easing their minds by uncommon and repeated plaudits and honest tears." This enthusiasm was aroused by the virtues of the characters, creating a sense of astonishment in the audience because they allowed them to feel admiration for people like themselves. This feeling became the hallmark of sentimentalism. Richard Steele stated that sentimental comedies, "makes us approve ourselves more" and Denis Diderot advocated that sentimentalism helps spectators remember that all nature is inherently good. Sentimentalists met resistance with playwrights of true comedy, who also had a moral aim but strove to reach it by exhibiting characters from which the audience should take warning instead of emulate.

Sentimental comedy influenced and became absorbed into a new genre called domestic tragedy beginning around the mid-18th century. These tragedies intended to use real-life situations, settings, and prose to move an audience and foreshadowed the realism to come in the 19th century.

== Critical response ==
=== Beaumarchais' An Essay on Serious Drama ===
Pierre Beaumarchais was very much in support of sentimental comedy and describes his reasoning in his essay published in 1767. He explains first that the purpose of sentimental comedy is to offer a more immediate interest and more direct moral lesson than tragedy, and a deeper meaning than comedy. Since according to Beaumarchais noisy laughter is the enemy of thought, sentimental comedy gives its audience a chance to find silent sympathy and thought provoking isolation in tears. Being touched by the action on stage allows viewers to learn from the play and as good men are reminded of the rewards of virtues they are able to relate the play's events to real life. The form is praised for doing away with verse and rhyme as they can obscure the meaning – making the truth disappear. Beaumarchais is instead in favor of language found in nature, and used in sentimental comedy.

To combat the opposition, Beaumarchais lays out some criticism of laughing comedy. He argues that laughing at others distances the laughter from those being made fun of and that mockery is therefore not the best weapon to fight vice. A play that encourages this type of behavior also interests the audience more in the rascal than the honest man showing the viewers that morality is shallow, worthless, and inverted. Even Beaumarchais admits that some critics describe the genre as deadly dawdling prose with no comic relief, maxims, or characters with improbable plots that will inspire laziness in young writers who will not take the time to write verse.

=== Goldsmith's An Essay on the Theatre ===
In this essay, alternately titled A Comparison between Laughing and Sentimental Comedy and published in 1773, Oliver Goldsmith invokes the classical definition of comedy through Aristotle and Terence and insists that comedy is meant to expose the vices rather than the distresses of man. He argues that theatre is meant to amuse its spectators and while sentimental comedy might amuse the public, laughing comedy would amuse them more. He goes further to say that the characters of sentimental comedy are difficult to relate to and that audience members will, therefore, remain indifferent to the characters' plight. Goldsmith advocates that since sentimental comedies show distresses that they should be labeled as tragedies, though a simple name change will not enhance their efficacy. The essay is ended with a sarcastic comment about the ease with which any writer could create a sentimental comedy with just some, "insipid dialogue, without character or humour...make a pathetic scene or two, with a sprinkling of tender melancholy conversation...and there is no doubt that all the ladies will cry".

Sentimental comedy had both supporters and naysayers, but by the 1770s the genre had all but died out, leaving in its place laughing comedies, such as Oliver Goldsmith's She Stoops to Conquer, which were generally concerned the intrigues of those living in upper-class society.

== See also ==
- Restoration comedy
- Domestic tragedy
- Comédie larmoyante
- History of theatre
