= James Spiller (comedian) =

British comedian

- Born: 1692
- Died: 7 February 1730 (aged 37–38)
- Occupation: Comedian

James Spiller (1692 – 7 February 1730) was a British comedian.

== Biography ==
Spiller was the son of ‘the’ Gloucester carrier, was born in 1692, and apprenticed to a landscape-painter named Ross. He obtained some proficiency, but, soon wearying of his occupation, joined a company of strolling players, of which, as low comedian, he became the principal support. Such absurd experiments as Alexander the Great and Mithridates were essayed by him. His genuine gifts were, however, soon recognised. From the outset he displayed the recklessness and intemperance which were the bane of his career, and had to resort to various shifts, and even to quit his engagements and run, in order to avoid arrest. At Drury Lane, whither he drifted, he is first heard of under Aaron Hill on 6 December 1709, when he played the Porter in Crowne's ‘Country Wit.’ Harlequin followed on the 27th. On 9 January 1710 he was the original Corporal Cuttum in Aaron Hill's farce, ‘The Walking Statue;’ on 27 March the First Boatswain in Mrs. Centlivre's ‘A Bickerstaffe's Burying, or Work for the Upholders,’ in which Mrs. Spiller (Mrs. Elizabeth Thompson) appeared as Lucy. On the junction of the companies at the Haymarket, Spiller, who had to undergo formidable rivalry, especially from William Pinkethman, was dismissed. He, however, played with Pinkethman at Greenwich during the summer of 1710, appearing as Polonius, Marplot in the ‘Busy Body,’ Higgen in the ‘Royal Merchant,’ Brass in the ‘Confederacy,’ Coupler, and Bustopha in Beaumont and Fletcher's ‘Fair Maid of the Mill.’ He was in 1711–12 back at Drury Lane, where he played Captain Anvil in Brome's ‘Northern Lass,’ and was on 5 June 1712 the original Ananias in Hamilton's ‘Petticoat Plotter.’ On 6 January 1713 he was the first Smart in Taverner's ‘Female Advocates,’ on the 29th the original first soldier in Charles Shadwell's ‘Humours of the Army,’ and Foist (a lawyer) in the ‘Apparition, or the Sham Wedding,’ on 25 November.

When the new theatre in Lincoln's Inn Fields was opened by John Rich, Spiller, though unmentioned by Colley Cibber, was one of the actors who, with Keen, William Bullock, George Pack, and Leigh, seceded from Drury Lane, and joined Rich in his new venture. At Lincoln's Inn Fields Spiller remained for the rest of his life. He was on 3 February 1715 the original Roger in Christopher Bullock's ‘Slip,’ taken from Middleton's ‘A Mad World, my Masters,’ and on the 16th Crispin in Molloy's ‘Perplexed Couple.’ He played Harlequin in the ‘Emperor of the Moon,’ Don Lewis in ‘Love makes a Man,’ and the False Count in Mrs. Behn's piece so named, and was on 14 June the original Captain Debonair in Griffin's ‘Love in a Sack.’ In the following season he played Gomez in the ‘Spanish Friar,’ Spitfire in the ‘Wife's Relief,’ Sir W. Belfond in the ‘Squire of Alsatia,’ Appetite in the ‘Sea Voyage,’ Blunderbuss in the ‘Woman Captain’ (his wife being Phillis), and Petro in the ‘Feigned Courtesans,’ to Mrs. Spiller's Laura Lucretia. On 21 April 1716, after a fashion of the day, he recited an epilogue seated on a donkey. Spiller was in the habit, for his benefit, of giving various entertainments, and on 13 April 1717 he announced ‘a new comi-tragi-mechanical prologue in the gay style, written and to be spoken by Spiller.’

The characters subsequently assigned to Spiller included, with many others, Hob in the ‘Country Wake,’ Bottom, Ben in ‘Love for Love,’ Hector in the ‘Gamester,’ Lord Froth in the ‘Double Dealer,’ Flip in the ‘Fair Quaker,’ First Murderer in ‘Macbeth’ and in ‘Richard III,’ Sexton in ‘Hamlet,’ Iachimo in the ‘Injured Princess’ [‘Cymbeline’], Moneytrap in the ‘Confederacy,’ Gentleman Usher in ‘Lear,’ Pistol in the ‘Merry Wives of Windsor,’ Pandarus in ‘Troilus and Cressida,’ Francis in ‘King Henry IV,’ pt. i., Mad Englishman in the ‘Pilgrim,’ Sham Doctor in the ‘Anatomist,’ Dr. Caius, Daniel in ‘Oronooko,’ Foigard in the ‘Beaux' Stratagem,’ Marplot, Fourbin in the ‘Soldiers' Fortune,’ Brush in ‘Love and a Bottle,’ Sir Politick Wouldbe in ‘Volpone,’ and Spruce in the ‘Fortune-hunters.’

His original characters were fairly numerous, but not as a rule important. Among them were James Spoilem, so named after James Spiller in Bullock's ‘Perjurer,’ 12 Dec. (Spiller, in the prologue, says, ‘In these short scenes my character is shown’); Periwinkle in Mrs. Centlivre's ‘Bold Stroke for a Wife,’ 3 February 1718; Brainworm in an alteration of ‘Every Man in his Humour’ on 11 January 1725; Mat of the Mint in the ‘Beggar's Opera’ on 29 January 1728.

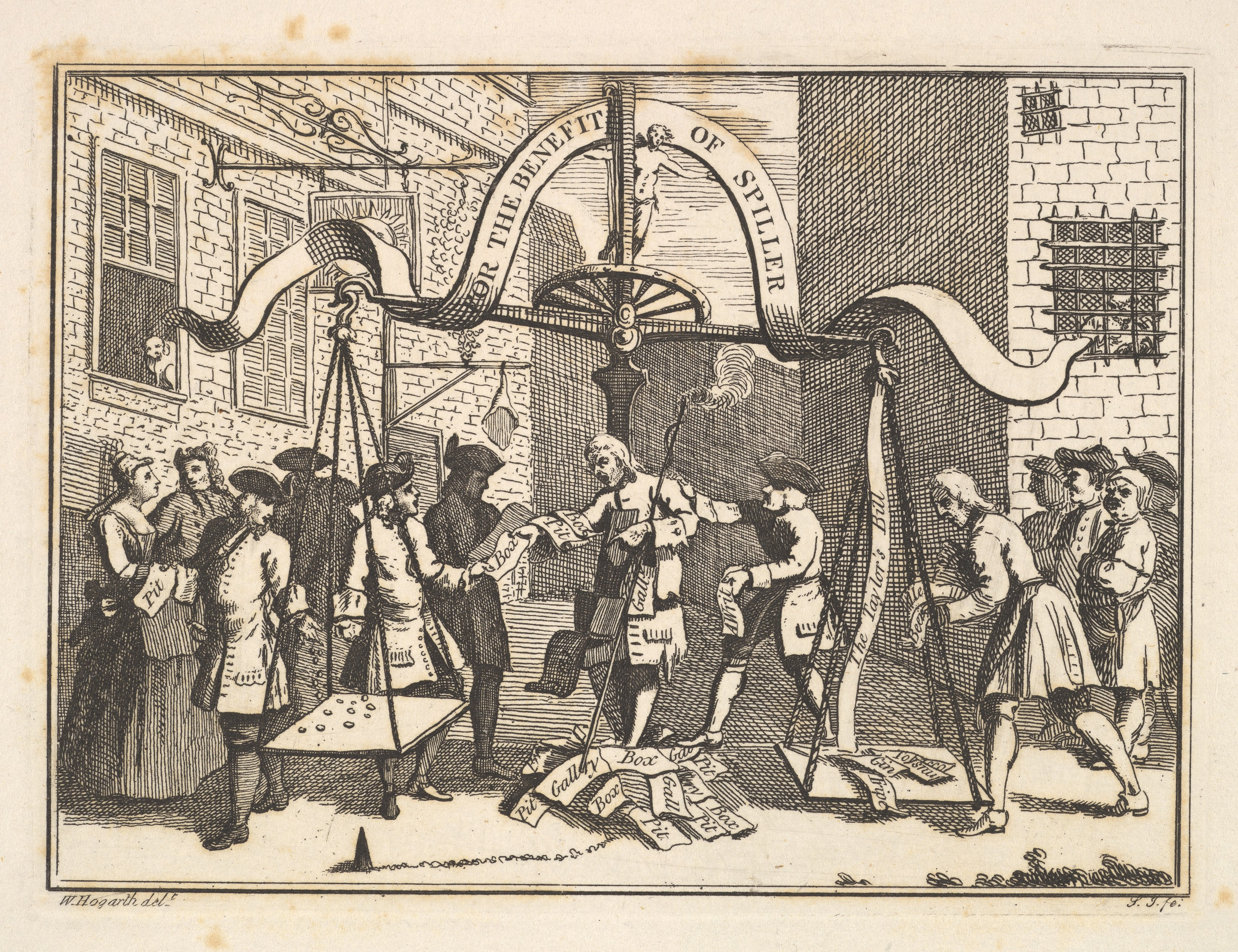
"Benefit Ticket for Spiller"

In consequence of his extravagance in living, Spiller had in early days to take refuge in the Southwark sanctuary, the Mint. After the abolition of this, he was from time to time confined in the Marshalsea. He was in high estimation with a certain world of fashion, and a public house near Clare Market, held by an ex-deputy-keeper of the Marshalsea, which he frequented, obtained much vogue. Its original title, the ‘Bull and Butcher,’ was changed about three months before his death into the ‘Spiller's Head,’ a sign presenting the actor's portrait having been painted and given to the proprietor by a Mr. Legar.

On 31 January 1730, while performing in Lewis Theobald's ‘Rape of Proserpina,’ Spiller had an apoplectic seizure, and died on 7 February following. He was buried, at the expense of Rich, in the churchyard of St. Clement's. An epitaph on him, written by a butcher in Clare Market, is quoted in his biography of 1729. It concludes: He was an inoffensive, merry fellow, When sober hipp'd, blithe as a bird when mellow.

His wife's name stands opposite some important parts, including Lady Anne in ‘Richard III.’ Spiller separated from her, however, and formed other ties. Spiller is credited with ‘performing all his parts excellently well in an unfashionable theatre, and to thin audiences.’ He had remarkable skill in transforming himself into whatever character he represented, and one night, as Stockwell in the ‘Artful Husband,’ is said to have completely deceived his special patron the Duke of Argyll, who, taking him for a new hand, recommended him to Rich as deserving encouragement. According to Louis Riccoboni, the historian of the stage, Spiller ‘acted the old man in a comedy taken from Crispin Medicine [sic] with such a nice degree of perfection as one could expect in no player who had not had forty years' experience. … I made no doubt of his being an old comedian, who, instructed by long practice and assisted by the weight of years, had performed the part so naturally; but how great was my surprise when I learnt that he was a young man about the age of twenty-six! … The wrinkles of his face, his sunk eyes, and his loose yellow cheeks, were incontestable proofs against what they said to me. I was credibly informed that the actor, to fit himself for the part of the old man, spent an hour in dressing himself, and disguised his face so nicely and painted so artificially a part of his eyebrows and eyelids that at the distance of six paces it was impossible not to be deceived’ (cf. Victor, Hist. of the Theatre, ii. 70).

Steele, in the ‘Anti-Theatre’ on 29 March 1720 (No. 13), published a letter signed ‘James Spiller,’ and addressed to the worshipful Sir John Falstaff, knight, in which Spiller advertises his benefit, which took place on the 31st. He talks humorously about his creditors, who pay their compliments every morning and ask when they shall be paid. He continues: ‘Wicked good company have [sic] brought me into this imitation of grandeur. I loved my friend and my jest too well to get rich; in short, Sir John, wit is my blind side.’ On this letter Nichols, the editor, noted that Spiller was ‘a comedian of great excellence, who may be considered as the Shuter of his day … a man of dissipated and irregular life; always in difficulties, and by these means lost the advantages of considerable talents.’ Nichols also says that he had but one eye, the loss being probably due to smallpox, of which he had a bad attack. Such of Spiller's jokes as are preserved are not very brilliant. They were collected in ‘Spiller's Jests, or the Life and Pleasant Adventures of the late celebrated Comedian, Mr. James Spiller,’ &c., London, n. d. [1729], 8vo (the chief recommendation of the volume is its scarcity).
