= The Drummer (play) =

1716 play

- Original language: English
- Written by: Joseph Addison
- Genre: Comedy

Premiere
- Date: 10 March 1716
- Place: Drury Lane Theatre

The Drummer is a 1716 comedy play by the British writer Joseph Addison, also known as The Drummer, or, The Haunted House.

It ran for three nights at the Drury Lane Theatre. It was the only new play staged at the theatre during that season. The cast featured Robert Wilks as Sir George Trueman, Anne Oldfield as Lady Trueman, Benjamin Johnson as Vellum, Colley Cibber as Tinsel, John Mills as Fantome, William Penkethman as Butler, Joe Miller as Coachman, Henry Norris as Gardiner and Margaret Saunders as Abigail.

Addison's longstanding collaborator Richard Steele wrote a preface to the work. It was partly inspired by the story of Drummer of Tedworth, but rewritten in a more contemporary context and made supportive of the recent Hanoverian Succession. It was revived in 1762 at both Drury Lane and Covent Garden to capitalise on public excitement concerning the recent supposed Cock Lane ghost haunting.

== Synopsis ==
Lady Truman is apparently widowed when she receives word that her husband Sir George has been killed in battle during the recent war. As she is now the wealthy owner of an estate she is pursued by two suitors, but concerningly the house is disturbed at night by repeated sounds of ghostly drumming. After the drumming has scared off the two suitors Mr. Tinsel and Mr. Fantome it is revealed to be the work of Sir George, still very much alive.

== Bibliography ==
- Burling William J. A Checklist of New Plays and Entertainments on the London Stage, 1700–1737. Fairleigh Dickinson Univ Press, 1992.
- Loftis, John Cylde. Steele at Drury Lane. University of California Press, 1952.
- Nicoll, Allardyce. A History of English Drama, 1660–1900: Early eighteenth century drama. University Press, 1955.
- Otten, Robert M. Joseph Addison. Twayne Publishers, 1982.
