= The Artful Husband =

Play by William Taverner

- Original language: English
- Written by: William Taverner
- Genre: Comedy

Premiere
- Date: 11 February 1717
- Place: Lincoln's Inn Fields Theatre

The Artful Husband is a 1717 comedy play by the British writer William Taverner. Staged at the Lincoln's Inn Fields Theatre, it ran for fifteen nights. It was frequently revived during the eighteenth century.

The cast included Thomas Elrington as Sir Harry Freelove, Theophilus Keene as Winwife, James Spiller as Stockwell, George Pack as Frank Flash, Jane Rogers as Mrs Winwife and Sarah Thurmond as Belinda. The part of Lady Upstart was played by the veteran actress Frances Maria Knight.

== List of Characters ==
- Sir Harry Freelove - Mr Elrington
- Lady Upstart - Mrs Knight
- Mr Winwife - Mr Keene
- Mrs Winwife - Mrs Rogers
- Belinda - Mrs Thurmond
- Mr Stockwel - Mr Spiller
- Frank Flash - Mr Pack
- Steward to Winwife - Mr Rogers
- Ned, servant to Sir Harry - Mr Knapp
- Butler - Mr Hall
- Decoy, a procuress - Mrs Kear
- Maria, a pretended French woman - Mrs Schoolding
- Four servants to Lady Upstart
- Servant to Belinda
- Servants to Mrs Winwife.
- Two chairmen

== Bibliography ==
- Burling, William J. A Checklist of New Plays and Entertainments on the London Stage, 1700-1737. Fairleigh Dickinson Univ Press, 1992.
- Howe, Elizabeth. The First English Actresses: Women and Drama, 1660-1700. Cambridge University Press, 1992.
