= Love's Last Shift =

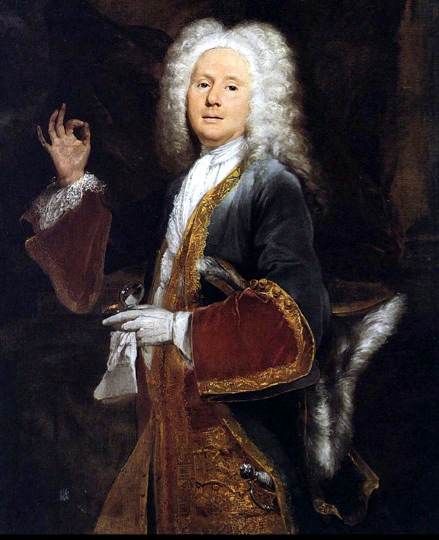
Colley Cibber depicted in the role of Lord Foppington in John Vanbrugh's The Relapse, the sequel to Love's Last Shift

Love's Last Shift, or The Fool in Fashion is an English Restoration comedy by Colley Cibber from 1696. The play is regarded as an early herald of a shift in audience tastes away from the intellectualism and sexual frankness of Restoration comedy and towards the conservative certainties and gender role backlash of sentimental comedy. It is often described as "opportunistic" (Hume), containing as it does something for everybody: daring Restoration comedy sex scenes, sentimental reconciliations, and broad farce.

== Character list ==
Men:

- Sir William Wisewoud, a rich old gentleman who fancies himself a great master of his passion, which he only is in trivial matters
- Loveless, of a debauched life, grew weary of his wife in six months; left her, and the Town, for debts he did not care to pay; and having spent the last part of his estate beyond sea, returns to England in a very mean state.
- Sir Novelty Fashion, a coxcomb that loves to be the first in all foppery
- Elder Worthy, a sober gentleman of a fair estate in love with Hillaria
- Young Worthy, his brother, of a looser temper, lover to Narcissa
- Snap, servant to Loveless
- Sly, servant to Young Worthy
- A lawyer

Women:

- Amanda, a woman of strict virtue, married to Loveless very young and forsaken by him
- Narcissa, daughter to Sir William Wisewoud, a fortune
- Hillaria, his niece
- Flareit, a kept mistress of Sir Novelty's
- Woman to Amanda
- Maid to Flareit

Colley Cibber played Sir Novelty Fashion in the original 1688 production.

== Synopsis ==
Love's Last Shift is the story of a last "shift" or trick that a virtuous wife, Amanda, is driven to, in order to reform and retain her out-of-control rakish husband Loveless. Loveless has been away for ten years, dividing his time between the brothel and the bottle, and no longer recognizes his wife when he returns to London. Acting the part of a high-class prostitute, Amanda invites Loveless into her luxurious house and treats him to the night of his dreams, confessing her true identity in the morning. Loveless is so impressed by her faithfulness that he immediately becomes a reformed character. A minor part which was a great success with the première audience is the fop Sir Novelty Fashion, written by Cibber for himself to play. Sir Novelty flirts with all the women, but is more interested in his own exquisite appearance and witticisms, and, writes Cibber modestly in his autobiography 45 years later, "was thought a good portrait of the foppery then in fashion".

The play was a great box office hit at the première run but has not stood the test of time. Theatre historians today remember it, if at all, because of John Vanbrugh's sequel The Relapse, or, Virtue in Danger, still a stage favourite, where the husband returns to polygamy.
