= William Taverner (dramatist) =

English dramatist and lawyer (died 1731)

William Taverner (died 8 January 1731) was an English lawyer, known as a dramatist.

== Life ==
The son of Jeremiah Taverner, a portrait-painter of the early 18th century, he was trained in the civil law, and practised at Doctors' Commons in London. He became a procurator-general of the Court of Arches of Canterbury.

Taverner died on 8 January 1731 at his house in Doctors' Commons. He had a reputation for professional honesty.

== Works ==
Taverner is known for the plays he wrote, particularly The Artful Husband, produced at London's Lincoln's Inn Fields on 11 February 1717: it ran for 15 nights. It was acted again in May 1721, and was later adapted by George Colman the elder as The Female Chevalier (1778) and William Macready the elder as The Bank Note (1795).

Taverner himself borrowed from The Lady of Pleasure (1637) by James Shirley, and from The Counterfeit Bridegroom (1677), an adaptation of Thomas Middleton's No Wit, No Help Like a Woman's sometimes attributed to Thomas Betterton. It was reported, too, that he was assisted by Joseph Browne. The play as printed ran through three editions; in the preface, Taverner complained of the injustice of John Rich, the patentee of the theatre, towards authors.

A companion comedy, The Artful Wife, appeared at Lincoln's Inn Fields 3 December 1717. It was printed with the date 1718 on the title-page.

Other works were:

- A masque on the story of Ixion (1697), performed around that time with The Italian Husband by Edward Ravenscroft.
- The Faithful Bride of Granada, acted at Drury Lane in 1704, and published in the same year.
- The Maid the Mistress, brought out at Drury Lane on 5 June 1708.
- The Female Advocates, acted only once, at Drury Lane, on 6 January 1713 (it was in part copied from The Lunatic, an anonymous unperformed piece of 1705).
- Presumptuous Love, printed without date, in 1716. This was a masque, with music by William Turner.
- Everybody Mistaken, brought out at Lincoln's Inn Fields on 10 March 1716, and acted three times.
- 'Tis Well if it Takes, presented 28 February 1719 at Lincoln's Inn Fields, and ran for five nights.

== Family ==
Taverner's widow, Alathea, took out letters of administration at the prerogative court of Canterbury on 6 February 1731. William Taverner the painter (1703–1772), their son, was articled to his father on 5 April 1720. Like his father, he became a procurator-general of the arches court of Canterbury.

== Notes ==
Attribution

This article incorporates text from a publication now in the public domain: Lee, Sidney, ed. (1898). "Taverner, William". Dictionary of National Biography. Vol. 55. London: Smith, Elder & Co.
