= William Taverner (artist) =

English judge and amateur landscape artist

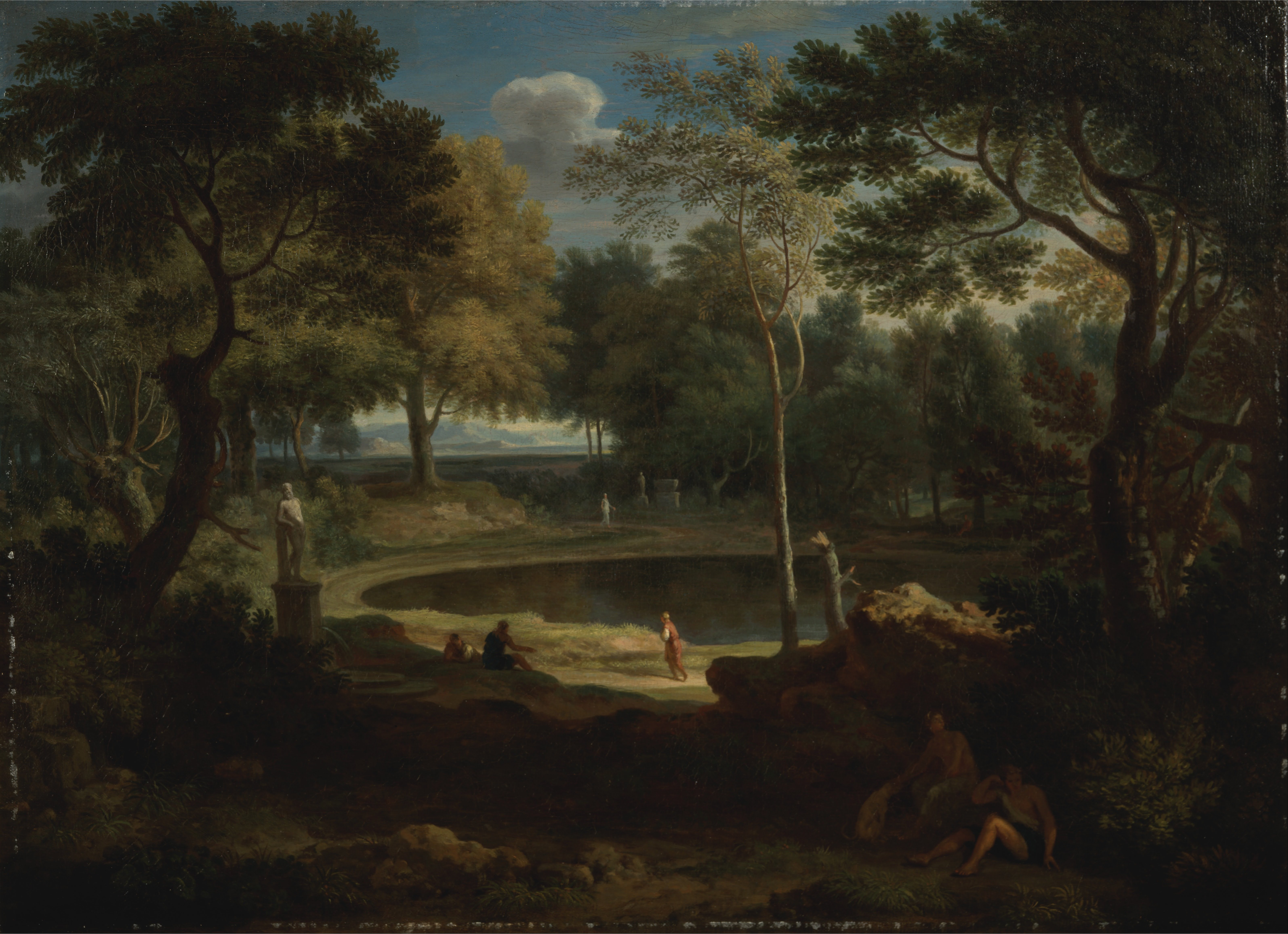
William Taverner Classical Landscape, 1760

William Taverner (1703 – 20 October 1772) was an English judge and amateur landscape artist.

== Life ==
Taverner was the son of dramatist William Taverner (d. 1731) and was articled (in the legal sense) to his father (a judge) on 5 April 1720. Like his father, he became a procurator-general of the Arches Court - the ecclesiastical court of the province of Canterbury, based in London. He devoted his leisure time to art, and according to Redgrave, 'His drawings are chiefly in body colour, imitating the Italian masters, mostly woody scenes, and, though clever, do not by any means maintain the great reputation which he enjoyed in his own day.'

He died on 20 October 1772 and a writer in the 'Gentleman's Magazine' (p. 496) called him "one of the best landscape-painters England ever produced, but as he painted only for amusement, his paintings are very rare, and will bear a high price". Taverner gave instructions for a will shortly before his death, and on personal evidence the will was proved in November 1772. No relatives are mentioned, but 2,900 pounds was left in trust for his servant, Sarah Davis. Taverner's pictures and books were to be sold.

Taverner never publicly exhibited his work and it is possible that, in his lifetime, his paintings circulated only amongst friends and fellow amateurs. His work was, however, highly regarded by George Vertue who described his "wonderful genius".
