= Comédie larmoyante =

Genre of French drama

Comédie larmoyante (French for 'tearful comedy') was a genre of French drama of the 18th century. In this type of sentimental comedy, the impending tragedy was resolved at the end, amid reconciliations and floods of tears. Plays of this genre that ended unhappily nevertheless allowed the audience to see that a "moral triumph" had been earned for the suffering heroes and heroines.

Thomas Heywood's masterpiece, A Woman Kilde with Kindnesse (acted 1603; printed 1607), can be considered a forerunner of this genre.

In Pierre-Claude Nivelle de La Chaussée's Mélanide, the genre is fully developed. Comedy was no longer to provoke laughter, but tears. The innovation consisted in destroying the sharp distinction then existing between tragedy and comedy in French literature. Indications of this change had been already offered in the work of Pierre Carlet de Chamblain de Marivaux, and La Chaussée's plays led naturally to the domestic drama of Denis Diderot and of Michel-Jean Sedaine.

Louis-Sébastien Mercier considered himself a supporter of this genre.

By blurring the distinctions between comedy and tragedy, the comédie larmoyante formed the basis for the subsequent genre known as drame bourgeois, the form of realistic comedy heralded by Diderot's Le Fils naturel (published 1757, performed 1771).

There are many examples of 'comédie larmoyante' in both French and Italian opera where it gave birth to the genre of opera semiseria: André Grétry's Lucile, Nicolas Dalayrac's Nina, ou La folle par amour, Pasquale Anfossi's La vera costanza (1776) and Joseph Haydn's work of the same name (1779).
