= The Anatomy of Criticism =

1933 book by Henry Hazlitt

The Anatomy of Criticism: A Trialogue
- Title page for The Anatomy of Criticism (1933)
- Author: Henry Hazlitt
- Language: English
- Genre: Literary Criticism
- Publisher: Simon and Schuster
- Publication date: 1933
- Publication place: United States
- ISBN: 9780598540485

The Anatomy of Criticism: A Trialogue (1933) is a book by Henry Hazlitt on literary criticism.
