= Pierre-Claude Nivelle de La Chaussée =

French playwright (1692-1754)

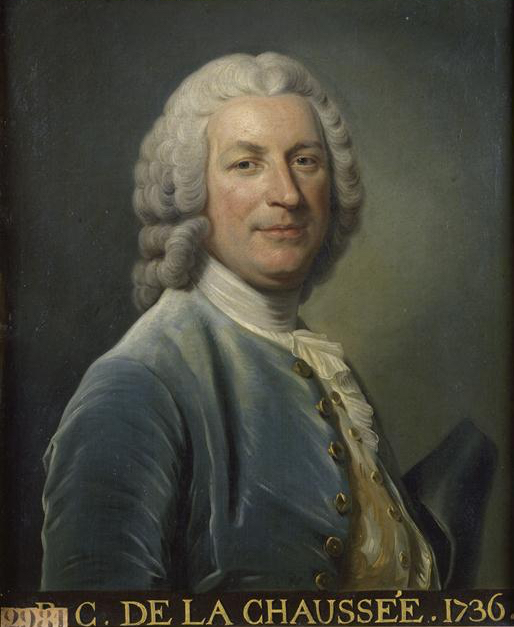
- Nivelle de La Chaussée (1736)
- Born: 14 February 1692; Paris, France
- Died: 14 May 1754 (aged 62); Paris, France
- Occupation: Playwright

Pierre-Claude Nivelle de La Chaussée (14 February 1692 in Paris – 14 May 1754 in Paris) was a French dramatist who blurred the lines between comedy and tragedy with his comédie larmoyante.

In 1731 he published an Epître de Clio, a didactic poem in defense of Leriget de la Faye in his dispute with Antoine Houdar de la Motte, who had maintained that verse was useless in tragedy. La Chaussée was forty years old before he produced his first play, La Fausse Antipathie (1734). His second play, Le Préjugé à la mode (1735) turns on the fear of incurring ridicule felt by a man in love with his own wife, a prejudice dispelled in France, according to La Harpe, by La Chaussée's comedy. L'École des amis (1737) followed, and, after an unsuccessful attempt at tragedy in Maximinien, he returned to comedy in Mélanide (1741).

Mélanide fully develops the type known as comédie larmoyante. Comedy was no longer to provoke laughter, but tears. The innovation consisted in destroying the sharp distinction then existing between tragedy and comedy in French literature. Indications of this change had been already offered in the work of Marivaux, and La Chaussée's plays led naturally to the domestic drama of Diderot and of Sedaine. The new method found bitter enemies. Alexis Piron nicknames the author "le Révérend Père Chaussée," and ridiculed him in one of his most famous epigrams.

Voltaire maintained that the comédie larmoyante was a proof of the inability of the author to produce either of the recognized kinds of drama, though he himself produced a play of similar character in L'Enfant prodigue. The hostility of the critics did not prevent the public from shedding tears nightly over the sorrows of La Chaussée's heroine.

L’École des Mères (1744) and La Gouvernante (1747) form, with those already mentioned, the best of his work. The strict moral aims pursued by La Chaussée in his plays seem hardly consistent with his private preferences. He frequented the same high society as did the comte de Caylus and contributed to the Recueils de ces messieurs. Villemain said of his style that he wrote prosaic verses with purity, while Voltaire, usually an adverse critic of his work, said he was "un des premiers après ceux qui ont du génie."

For the comédie larmoyante see Gustave Lanson, Ninette de la Chaussée et la comédie larmoyante (1887).

== Works ==
Sablier published the Œuvres de Monsieur Nivelle de La Chaussée (Paris, Prault, 1762, 5 vol. in-12°). Other Œuvres choisies (Paris, 1813, 2 vol. in-18; 1825, in-18°) were published including:

- 1731: Épître de Clio à M. de B*** au sujet des opinions répandues depuis peu contre la poésie,
- 1733: La Fausse Antipathie, comedy in 3 acts, in verse, 12 October,
- 1735: Le Préjugé à la mode, comedy in 5 acts, in verse, 3 February,
- 1737: L'École des amis, comedy in 5 acts, in verse, 26 February,
- 1738: Maximien, tragedy, Comédie-Française, 28 February,
- 1741: Mélanide, comedy in 5 acts, in verse, Comédie-Française, 12 May,
- 1742: Amour pour amour, comedy in 3 acts, in verse, with a prologue, Comédie-Française, January,
- 1743: Paméla, comedy in 5 acts,
- 1744: L'École des mères, comedy in 5 acts, in verse, 27 April,
- 1746: Le Rival de lui-même, comédie nouvelle in 1 act, in verse, preceded by a prologue, with entertainments, Comédie-Française, 20 April,
- 1747: La Gouvernante, Comédie-Française, 18 January,
- 1747: L'Amour castillan, comedy in 3 acts, in verse, with a divertissement, Comédie-Italienne, 11 April,
- 1749: L'École de la jeunesse, comedy in 5 acts,
- 1750: Élise ou la Rancune officieuse, comedy in 1 act,
- 1756: Le Retour imprévu, comedy in 3 acts, Comédie Italienne,
- Le Vieillard amoureux, comedy in 3 acts, non performed, at least by a theatre in Paris
- L'Homme de fortune, comedy in 5 acts, non performed
- Les Tyrinthiens, comedy in 3 acts, non performed
- La Princesse de Sidon, tragi-comedy in 3 acts, non performed
- Le Rapatriage, comi-parade in 1 act, licencious play
- Contes en vers, ribald work

== Sources ==
- Gustave Lanson, Nivelle de La Chaussée et la comédie larmoyante, Paris, Hachette, 1887. Available on Gallica.
