= Richard Steele =

Anglo-Irish writer and politician (1671–1729)

Sir Richard Steele
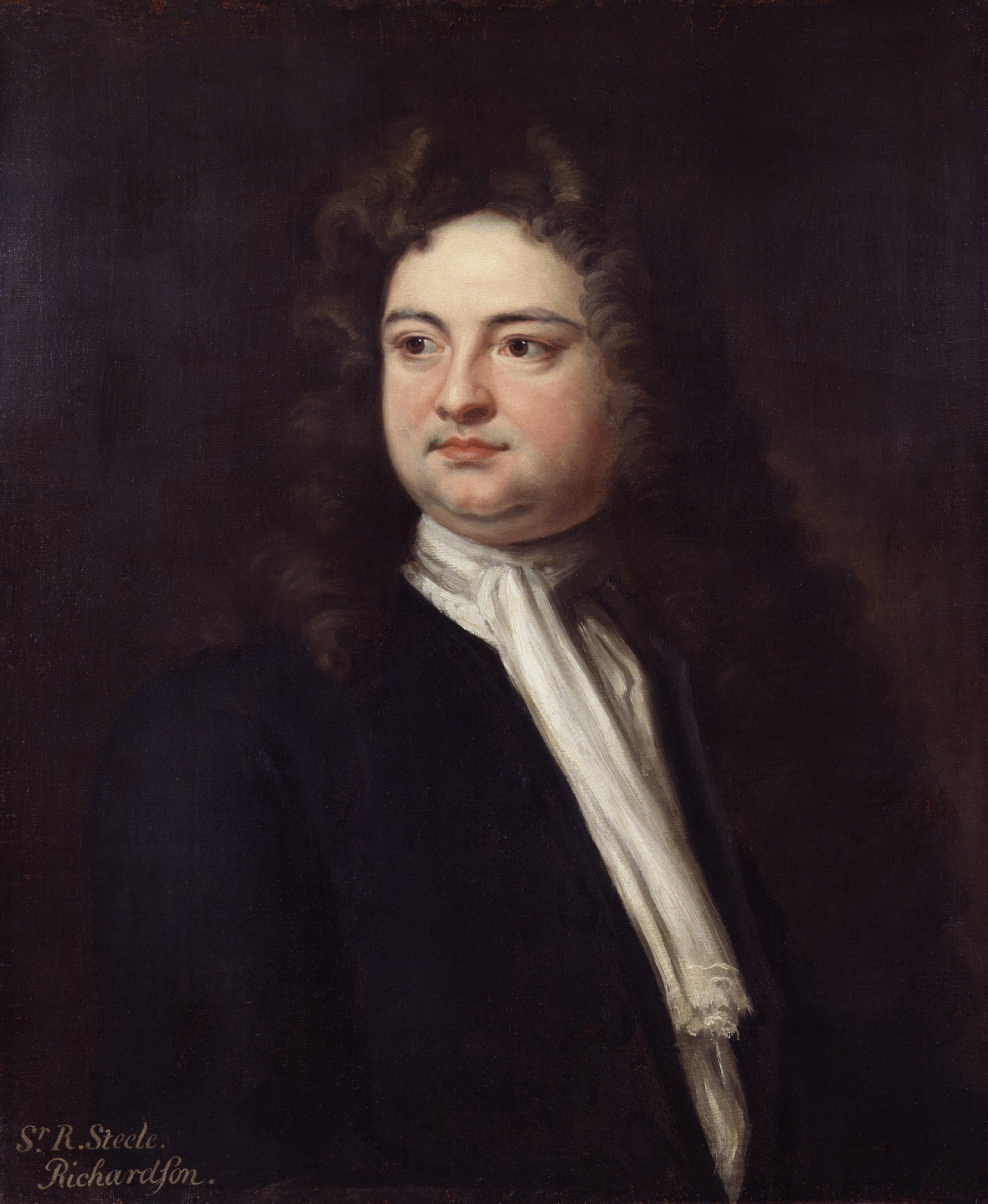
- Portrait by Jonathan Richardson, 1712
- Born: 1671; Dublin, Ireland
- Died: 1 September 1729 (aged 57–58); Carmarthen, Wales
- Education: Christ Church, Oxford; Merton College, Oxford
- Occupations: Writer, playwright, politician
- Known for: Founder of The Spectator

Sir Richard Steele (c. 1671 – 1 September 1729) was an Anglo-Irish writer, playwright and politician best known as the co-founder of the magazine The Spectator alongside his close friend Joseph Addison.

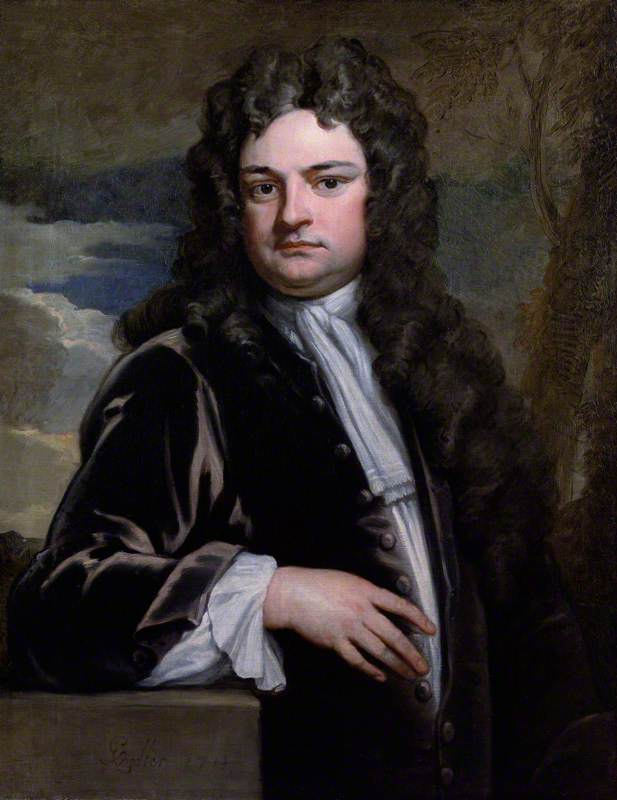
c. 1712 kit-cat portrait of Steele by Sir Godfrey Kneller

== Early life ==
Steele was born in Dublin, Ireland, in 1671 to Richard Steele, a wealthy attorney, and Elinor Symes (née Sheyles); his sister Katherine was born the previous year. He was the grandson of Sir William Steele, Lord Chancellor of Ireland and his first wife Elizabeth Godfrey. His father lived at Mountown House, Monkstown, Dublin. His mother, of whose family background little is known, was described as "a very beautiful woman, of a noble spirit".

His father died when he was four, and his mother a year later. Steele was largely raised by his uncle and aunt, Henry Gascoigne (secretary to James Butler, 1st Duke of Ormonde), and Lady Katherine Mildmay.

A member of the Protestant gentry, he was educated at Charterhouse School, where he first met Addison. After starting at Christ Church, Oxford, he went on to Merton College, Oxford, then joined the Life Guards of the Household Cavalry in order to support King William's wars against France. He was commissioned in 1697, and rose to the rank of captain within two years.

== Literary life ==
Steele's first published work, The Christian Hero (1701), attempted to point out the differences between perceived and actual masculinity. Written while Steele served in the army, it expressed his idea of a pamphlet of moral instruction. The Christian Hero was ultimately ridiculed for what some thought was hypocrisy because Steele did not necessarily follow his own preaching. He was criticized for publishing a booklet about morals when he himself enjoyed drinking, occasional duelling, and debauchery around town.

Steele wrote a comedy that same year titled The Funeral. This play met with wide success and was performed at Drury Lane, bringing him to the attention of the King and the Whig party. Next, Steele wrote The Lying Lover (1703), one of the first sentimental comedies, but a failure on stage.

Steele was a member of the Whig Kit-Kat Club. Both Steele and Addison became closely associated with Child's Coffee-house in St Paul's Churchyard.

Steele left the army in 1705, perhaps due to the death of the 34th Foot's commanding officer, Lord Lucas, which limited his opportunities of promotion.

Also in 1705, Steele married a widow, Margaret Stretch, who died the following year. After Margaret's death, a slave plantation she owned in Barbados came into Steele's ownership. At her funeral he met his second wife, Mary Scurlock, whom he nicknamed "Prue" and married in 1707. In the course of their courtship and marriage, he wrote more than 400 letters to her.

Steele wrote The Tender Husband (1705) with contributions from Addison, and later that year wrote the prologue to The Mistake, by John Vanbrugh, also an important member of the Kit-Kat Club.

In 1706, Steele was appointed to a position in the household of Prince George of Denmark, consort of Anne, Queen of Great Britain. He also gained the favour of Robert Harley, Earl of Oxford.

The Tatler, Steele's first public journal, first came out on 12 April 1709, and appeared three times a week: on Tuesdays, Thursdays, and Saturdays. Steele edited this periodical under the pseudonym Isaac Bickerstaff and gave the Bickerstaff character an entire, fully developed personality. "Bickerstaff's" best Tatler columns were published by Steele as the book Isaac Bickerstaff, Physician and Astrologer later that year.

Steele described his motive in writing The Tatler as "to expose the false arts of life, to pull off the disguises of cunning, vanity, and affectation, and to recommend a general simplicity in our dress, our discourse, and our behaviour". Steele founded the magazine, and although he and Addison collaborated, Steele wrote the majority of the essays; Steele wrote roughly 188 of the 271 total and Addison 42, with 36 representing the pair's collaborative works. While Addison contributed to The Tatler, it is widely regarded as Steele's work.

The Tatler was closed down in early 1711 to avoid the complications of running a Whig publication that had come under Tory attack. Addison and Steele then founded The Spectator in 1711 and also The Guardian in 1713.

== Parliamentary and late literary life ==
Steele became a Whig Member of Parliament in 1713, for Stockbridge. He was soon expelled for issuing a pamphlet in favour of the Hanoverian succession. When the Hanoverian George I of Great Britain came to the throne in the following year, Steele was knighted and given responsibility for the Theatre Royal, Drury Lane, London. He returned to parliament in 1715, for Boroughbridge.

He wrote a preface to Addison's 1716 comedy play The Drummer.

His wife Mary died in 1718, at a time when she was considering separation. Their daughter, Elizabeth (Steele's only surviving legitimate child), married John Trevor, 3rd Baron Trevor.

Steele ended his parliamentary career in March 1722.

While at Drury Lane, Steele wrote and directed the sentimental comedy The Conscious Lovers, which was an immediate hit on stage in November 1722.

== Retirement ==
Steele fell out with Addison and with the government administration over the Peerage Bill (1719), and in 1724, he retired to his second wife's homeland of Wales, where he spent the remainder of his life.

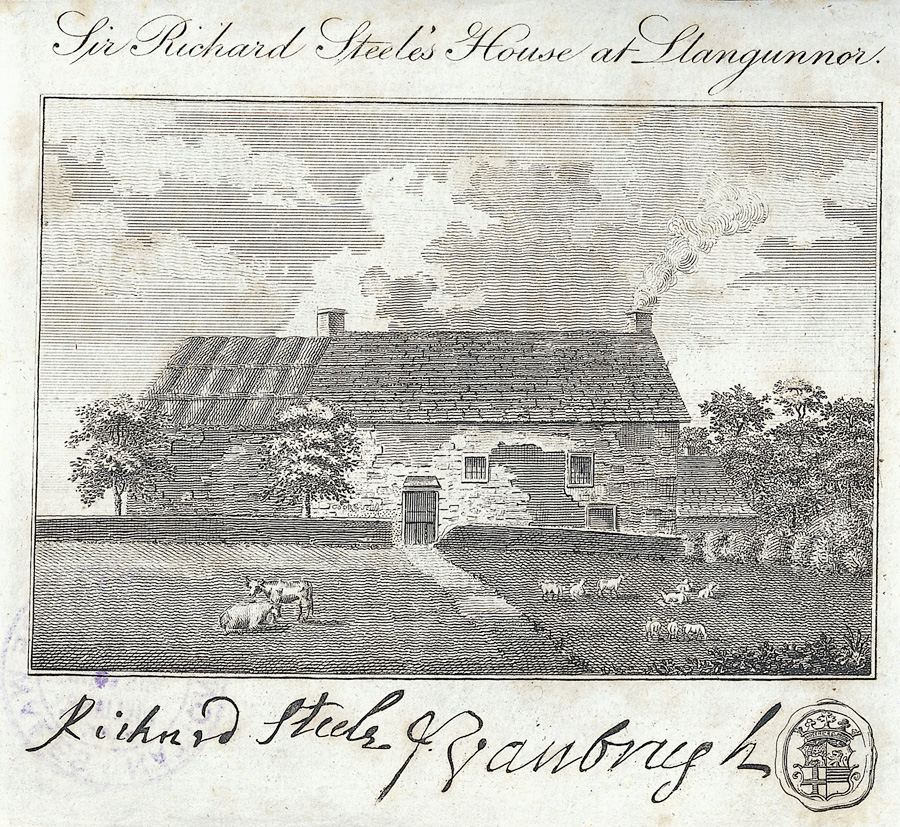
Steele's house at Llangunnor, near Carmarthen, 1797

Steele died in 1729. He was buried in Carmarthen at St Peter's Church. During the restoration of the church in 2000, his skull was discovered in a lead casket, having previously been accidentally disinterred during the 1870s.

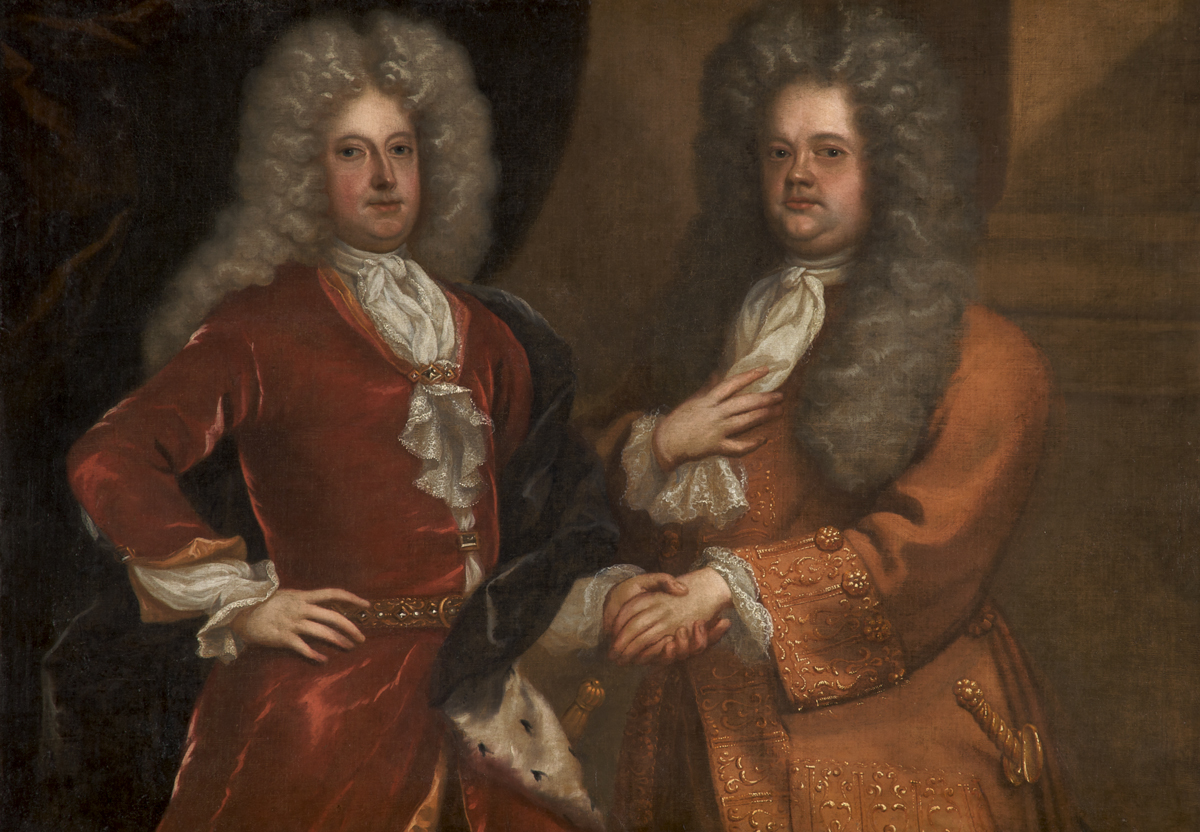
Of the 271 essays published in The Tatler journal, Joseph Addison (left) wrote 42, Steele (right) wrote roughly 188, and the rest were collaborations between the two writers.

== In literature ==
Steele plays a minor role in the novel The History of Henry Esmond by William Makepeace Thackeray. It is during his time with the Life Guards, where he is mostly referred to as Dick the Scholar and makes mention of his friend "Joe Addison". Thackeray depicts Steele in glowing terms as a warm, generous, talented mentor who befriends the title character in his youth and remains loyal to him for years despite their political differences.

== See also ==
- List of abolitionist forerunners

Parliament of Great Britain
Preceded by The Earl of Barrymore; George Dashwood	Member of Parliament for Stockbridge; 1713–1714; With: Thomas Brodrick	Succeeded by Thomas Brodrick; The Earl of Barrymore
Preceded by Sir Brian Stapylton, Bt; Edmund Dunch	Member of Parliament for Boroughbridge; 1715–1722; With: Thomas Wilkinson 1715–1718; Sir Wilfrid Lawson, Bt 1718–1722	Succeeded by Conyers Darcy; James Tyrrell
Preceded by Sir Roger Hill; Richard Grenville	Member of Parliament for Wendover; 1722–1727; With: Richard Hampden	Succeeded by Richard Hampden; The Viscount of Limerick
