= John Durant Breval =

English writer

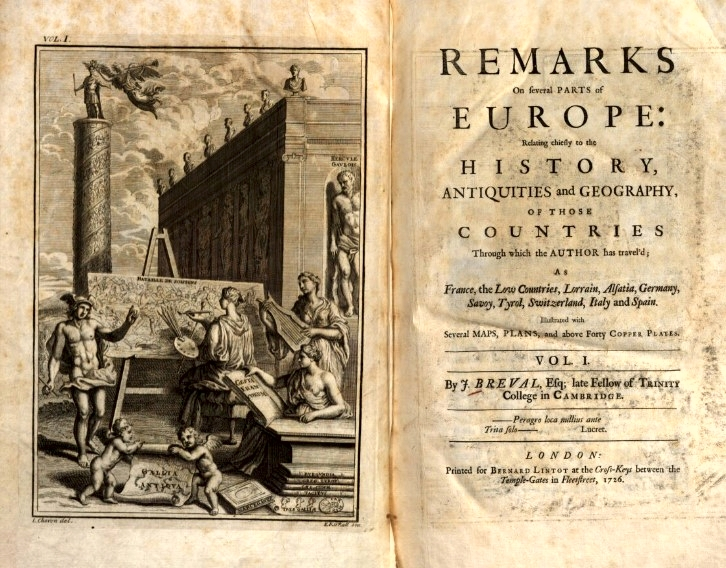
Remarks on Several Parts of Europe, 1726 edition

John Durant Breval (c.1680 – January 1738) was an English poet, playwright, and miscellaneous writer. He started his literary career under the alias of Joseph Gay and later gained popularity as a travel writer while using his own name after 37 editions of his Remarks on Several Parts of Europe, Relating Chiefly to their Antiquities and History were published in England between 1726 and 1738.

== Early life ==
Breval descended from a French refugee protestant family, and was the son of Francis Durant de Breval, prebendary of Rochester from 1671 and on and then prebendary of Westminster starting from 1675. Sir John Bramston, in his Autobiography (1845), describes the elder Breval in 1672 as "formerly a priest of the Romish church, and of the companie of those in Somerset House, but now a convert to the protestant religion and a preacher at the Savoy". This refers to the Queen's Chapel of the Savoy built by Inigo Jones where Henrietta Maria of France, wife of King Charles I, could exercise her Roman Catholic religion. Bramston gives 1666 as the date of the senior Breval conversion.

The younger Breval was admitted a Queen's Scholar of Westminster School in 1693, was elected to Trinity College, Cambridge, 1697, and was one of the Cambridge poets who celebrated in that year the return of William III after the peace of Ryswick. Breval proceeded B. A. 1700, and M.A. 1704. In 1702 he was made fellow of Trinity.

== At Trinity ==
In 1708 he was involved in a private scandal, which led to his removal from the fellowship at Trinity. He engaged in an intrigue with a married woman in Berkshire, and cudgelled her husband, who allegedly ill-treated his wife. The husband brought an action against Breval, who was held to bail for the assault, but, conceiving that there was an informality in the proceedings against him, did not appear at the assizes, and was outlawed. Thereupon Richard Bentley, the Master of Trinity, took the matter up, and on 5 April 1708 expelled Breval from the college. Bentley admitted that Breval was "a man of good learning and excellent parts," but said his 'crime was so notorious as to admit of no, evasion or palliation'.

Breval, however, declared on oath that he was not guilty of immoral conduct in the matter, and bitterly resented the interposition of Bentley, who, he declared, had a private grudge both against his father and himself. His friends said that the alleged offense rested on mere rumor and suspicion, and that the expelled fellow would have good grounds for an action against the college. Such an action, however, was never brought, probably on account of Breval's poverty. As Bentley wrote, "his father was just dead [Francis Breval d. February 1707] in poor circumstances, and all his family were beggars."

== Military exploits ==
Breval, in want and with his reputation ruined, enlisted in despair as a volunteer in English troops in Flanders under Marlborough, where he soon rose to be an ensign. Then, what John Bowyer Nichols calls 'his exquisite pencil and genteel behaviour,' as well as his skill in acquiring languages, attracted the attention of Marlborough. The general appointed him captain, and sent him on diplomatic missions to various German courts, which he accomplished very creditably.

The Peace of Utrecht closed the war in 1713, and a few years after we find Breval busily writing for the London booksellers, chiefly under the name of Joseph Gay.

== Literary pursuits ==
He wrote 'The Petticoat,' a poem in two books (1716), of which the third edition was published under the name of 'The Hoop Petticoat' (1720); 'The Art of Dress,' a poem (1717); 'Calpe or Gibraltar,' a poem (1717); 'A Compleat Key to the Nonjuror' (1718), in which he accuses Colley Cibber of stealing his characters from various sources, but chiefly from Moliere's 'Tartuffe,' for the revival of which Breval wrote a prologue; 'MacDermot, or the Irish Fortune Hunter,' a poem (1719), a witty but extremely gross piece; and 'Ovid in Masquerade' (1719). He also wrote a comedy, The Play is the Plot (1718), which was acted, though not very successfully, at the Theatre Royal, Drury Lane. When altered and reprinted afterwards as a farce, called The Strollers (second impression 1727), it had better fortune.

== Quarrel with Pope ==
About 1720, Breval went abroad with George Cholmondeley, Viscount Malpas, as travelling tutor. It was probably during this journey that he met with the romantic adventure that gave occasion for Alexander Pope's sneer about being 'followed by a nun' (Dunciad, iv. 327). A nun confined against her will, in a convent at Milan, fell in love with and 'escaped to him.' The lady afterwards went to Rome, where, according to Horace Walpole, she 'pleaded her cause and was acquitted there, and married Breval;' but she is not noticed in the account which Breval published of his travels, under the title of 'Remarks on several Parts of Europe,' four vols. (vols. i/ii, 1726; vols. i/ii. 1738), though we have a somewhat elaborate description of Milan, and an account of 'a Milanese Lady of great Beauty, who bequeathed her Skeleton to the Publick as a memento mori.'

The cause of Pope's quarrel with Breval is to be sought elsewhere. The well-known poet John Gay, with the help of Pope and John Arbuthnot, produced the farce entitled Three Hours after Marriage, which was deservedly damned. At this time (1717) Breval, who was writing a good deal for Edmund Curll, wrote for him, under the pseudonym of 'Joseph Gay,' a satire called The Confederates, in which 'the late famous comedy' and its three authors were unsparingly ridiculed. Pope is described in the prologue as one

"On whom Dame Nature nothing good bestowed:
In Form a Monkey; but for spite a Toad,"

and he is represented (scene 1) as saying, 'And from My Self my own Thersites drew,' and then Thersites is explained as 'A Character in Homer, of an Ill-natur'd, Deform'd Villain.' In the same year Breval published, under similar auspices, Pope's 'Miscellany.' The second part consisted of five brief coarse and worthless poems, in one of which especially, called the 'Court Ballad,' Pope is mercilessly ridiculed. Revenge for these was taken in the Dunciad, and Breval's name occurs twice in the second book (1728).

In the notes (1729) affixed to the first passage Pope says that some account must be given of Breval owing to his obscurity, and declares that Curll put 'Joseph Gay' on such pamphlets that they might pass for Mr. Gay's (viz. John Gay's). In 1742, when Breval had been dead four years, the fourth book of the 'Dunciad' was published. In line 272 a 'lac'd Governor from France' is introduced with his pupil, and their adventures abroad are narrated at some length (273–336). Pope, though, as he states, giving him no particular name, chiefly had Breval in his mind when he wrote the lines (Horace Walpole, Notes on the Poems of Alexander Pope, p. 101, contributed by Sir W. Fraser, 1876).

== Travel writer ==
After the publication of his 'Travels' Breval was probably again engaged as travelling governor to young gentlemen of position. In the account of Paris given in the second volume of his 'Remarks' he says that he has collected the information 'in ten several tours thither' (p. 262). In the latter period of his life he wrote 'The Harlot's Progress,' an illustrated poem in six cantos, suggested by Hogarth's well-known prints, and said by Ambrose Philips, in a prefatory letter, to be 'a true Key and lively Explanation of the Painter's Hieroglyphicks' (1732); The History of the most Illustrious House of Nassau, with regard to that branch of it more particularly that came into the succession of Orange (1734); The Rape of Helen, a mock opera (acted at Covent Garden), (1737).

== Later life ==
Shortly after the publication of this last piece Breval died at Paris, January 1738, "universally beloved".
