= Thomas Bretnor =

Thomas Bretnor (fl. 1605–1619) was an English almanac maker, astrologer, and teacher of mathematics, astronomy, and navigation. Bretnor described himself on the title-pages of his almanacs as a "student in astronomie and physicke" and as a "professor of the mathematicks and student in physicke in Cow Lane, London."

Bretnor was a notable figure in London’s intellectual community and resided in Cow Lane, which connected Snow Hill and West Smithfield. He was a close associate of John Thompson, an instrument-maker in nearby Hosier Lane. While Thompson specialized in wooden instruments, Bretnor recommended his "loving friend" Elias Allen for brass or silver instruments, demonstrating his connections within London’s scientific circles.

His network included prominent contemporaries such as the surveyor Aaron Rathbone, mathematician Edmund Gunter, and astronomer Arthur Hopton. Rathbone endorsed Bretnor as a skilled mathematical teacher, and after Hopton’s death in 1614, Bretnor offered to teach the use of Hopton’s mathematical instrument, the Clavis Mathematica, believed to be a type of sector.

Bretnor was an advocate of the Copernican heliocentric system, a view shared by many of his close associates but still contentious in his time. His progressive stance on astronomy distinguished him from more conservative contemporaries.

A colorful and sometimes controversial figure, Bretnor’s fame extended into popular culture. He was satirized by Ben Jonson in The Devil is an Ass (1616) and mentioned by Thomas Middleton in A Fair Quarrel (1617), reflecting his renown in 17th-century London.

== Works ==
His extant works are as follows:

- A Prognostication for this Present Yeere … M.DC.VII. … Imprinted at London for the Companie of Stationers (a copy is in the British Museum). Necessary observations in Phlebotomie and Advertisements in Husbandrie are introduced into the work.
- A Newe Almanacke and Prognostication for … 1615 (copies are in the Huth Library and the Bodleian).
- Opiologia, or a Treatise concerning the nature, properties, true preparation, and safe vse and administration of Opium. By Angelus Sala Vincentines Venatis, and done into English and something enlarged by Tho. Bretnor, M.M., London, 1618. This translation, which is made from the French, is dedicated "to the learned and my worthily respected friends D. Bonham and Maister Nicholas Carter, physitians". In an address to the reader Bretnor defends the use of laudanum in medicine, promises to prepare for his readers "the chiefest physicke I vse my selfe", and mentions his friends "Herbert Whitfield in Newgate Market" and "Maister Bromhall" as good druggists.
