= Comedy (drama) =

Theatrical genre intended to make an audience laugh

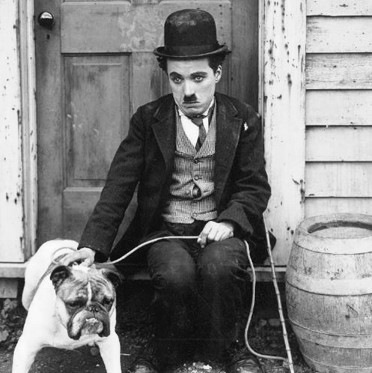
- Charlie Chaplin, one of the most famous comedians of the 20th century
- Medium: Theatre; stand-up; sound recording; film; radio; television
- Types: Anecdotal; black; blue; character; improvisational; insult; musical; one-liners; slapstick; sitcom; sketch; surreal; satire; ventriloquism; word play
- Ancestor arts: Jester; harlequinade; clown
- Originating culture: Ancient Greece
- Originating era: 425 BC

Comedy is a genre of dramatic performance having a light or humorous tone that depicts amusing incidents and in which the characters ultimately triumph over adversity. For ancient Greeks and Romans, a comedy was a stage-play with a happy ending. In the Middle Ages, the term expanded to include narrative poems with happy endings and a lighter tone. In this sense Dante used the term in the title of his poem, the Divine Comedy (Italian: Divina Commedia).

The phenomena connected with laughter and that which provokes it have been carefully investigated by psychologists. The predominating characteristics are incongruity or contrast in the object, and shock or emotional seizure on the part of the subject. It has also been held that the feeling of superiority is an essential factor: thus Thomas Hobbes speaks of laughter as a "sudden glory." Modern investigators have paid much attention to the origin both of laughter and of smiling, as well as the development of the "play instinct" and its emotional expression.

Much comedy contains variations on the elements of surprise, incongruity, conflict, repetitiveness, and the effect of opposite expectations, but there are many recognized genres of comedy. Satire and political satire use ironic comedy used to portray persons or social institutions as ridiculous or corrupt, thus alienating their audience from the object of humor.

Parody borrows the form of some popular genre, artwork, or text but uses certain ironic changes to critique that form from within (though not necessarily in a condemning way). Screwball comedy derives its humor largely from bizarre, surprising (and improbable) situations or characters. Black comedy is defined by dark humor that makes light of so-called dark or evil elements in human nature. Similarly scatological humor, sexual humor, and race humor create comedy by violating social conventions or taboos in comedic ways.

A comedy of manners typically takes as its subject a particular part of society (usually upper class society) and uses humor to parody or satirize the behavior and mannerisms of its members. Romantic comedy is a popular genre that depicts burgeoning romance in humorous terms, and focuses on the foibles of those who are falling in love.

== Etymology ==
The word "comedy" is derived from the Classical Greek κωμῳδία, which is a compound either of κῶμος (revel) or κώμη (village) and ᾠδή (singing): it is possible that κῶμος itself is derived from κώμη, and originally meant a village revel. The adjective "comic" (Greek κωμικός), which strictly means that which relates to comedy is, in modern usage, generally confined to the sense of "laughter-provoking". The word came into modern usage through the Latin comoedia and Italian commedia and has, over time, passed through various shades of meaning.

== History ==
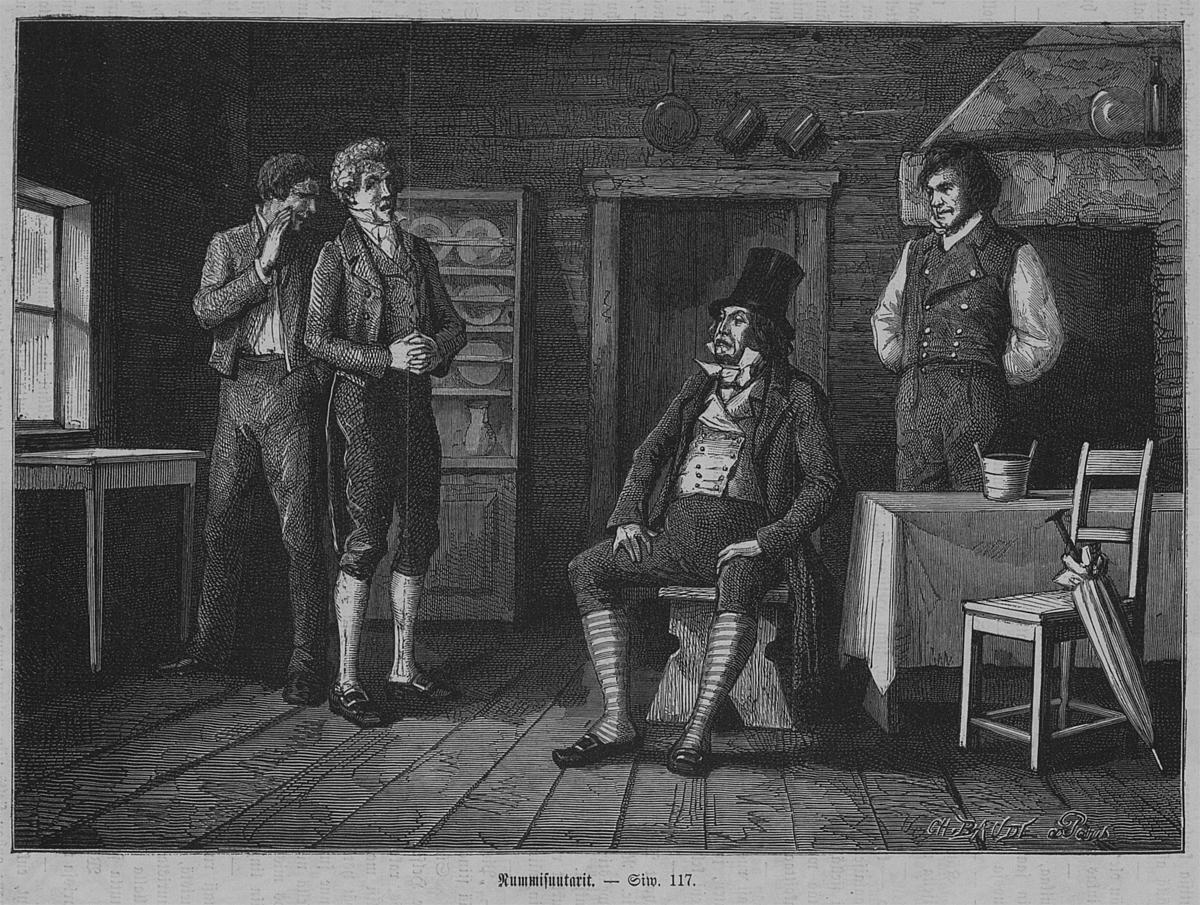
Albert Edelfelt's drawing from the Finnish comedy play Heath Cobblers premiered in 1876.

In ancient Greece, comedy seems to have originated in songs or recitations apropos of fertility festivals or gatherings, or also in making fun at other people or stereotypes. In the Poetics, Aristotle states that comedy originated in phallic rituals and festivals of mirth. It is basically an imitation of "the ridiculous, which is a species of the ugly". However, Aristotle taught that comedy is a good thing. It brings forth happiness, which for Aristotle is the ideal state, the final goal in any activity. He does believe that we humans feel pleasure oftentimes by doing the wrong thing, but he does not necessarily believe that comedy and humor is the wrong thing. It is also not true for Aristotle that a comedy must involve sexual humor to qualify as a comedy. A comedy is about the fortunate arise of a sympathetic character. A happy ending is all that is required in his opinion.

In contrast, Plato taught that comedy is a destruction to the self. He believed it produces an emotion that overrides rational self-control and learning. In The Republic, Plato says that the guardians of the state should avoid laughter, "for ordinarily when one abandons himself to violent laughter, his condition provokes a violent reaction." Plato says comedy should be tightly controlled if one wants to achieve the ideal state.

Literary critic Northrop Frye described the comic genre as a drama that pits two societies against each other in an amusing agon or conflict. In The Anatomy of Criticism (1957) he depicted these two opposing sides as a "Society of Youth" and a "Society of the Old", but this dichotomy is seldom described as an entirely satisfactory explanation. A later view characterizes the essential agon of comedy as a struggle between a powerless youth and the societal conventions that pose obstacles to its hopes; in this sense, the youth is understood to be constrained by its lack of social authority, and is left with little choice but to take recourse to ruses that engender dramatic consequences.

== Types of comic drama ==
- Ancient Greek comedy, as practiced by Aristophanes and Menander
- Ancient Roman comedy, as practiced by Plautus and Terence
- Ancient Indian comedy, as practiced in Sanskrit drama
- Burlesque, from Music hall and Vaudeville to Performance art
- Citizen comedy, as practiced by Thomas Dekker, Thomas Middleton and Ben Jonson
- Clowns such as Richard Tarlton, William Kempe and Robert Armin
- Comedy of humours, as practiced by Ben Jonson and George Chapman
- Comedy of intrigue, as practiced by Niccolò Machiavelli and Prince Manuel
- Comedy of manners, as practiced by Molière, William Wycherley and William Congreve
- Comedy of menace, as practiced by David Campton and Harold Pinter
- comédie larmoyante or 'tearful comedy', as practiced by Pierre-Claude Nivelle de La Chaussée and Louis-Sébastien Mercier
- Commedia dell'arte, as practiced in the twentieth century by Dario Fo, Vsevolod Meyerhold and Jacques Copeau
- Farce, from Georges Feydeau to Joe Orton and Alan Ayckbourn
- Jester
- Laughing comedy, as practiced by Oliver Goldsmith and Richard Brinsley Sheridan
- Restoration comedy, as practiced by George Etherege, Aphra Behn and John Vanbrugh
- Sentimental comedy, as practiced by Colley Cibber and Richard Steele
- Shakespearean comedy, as practiced by William Shakespeare
- Dadaist and Surrealist performance, usually in cabaret form
- Theatre of the Absurd, used by some to describe Samuel Beckett, Harold Pinter, Jean Genet and Eugène Ionesco
