= 1704 in literature =

This article contains information about the literary events and publications of 1704.

== Events ==
- July – The Storm: or, a collection of the most remarkable casualties and disasters which happen'd in the late dreadful tempest, both by sea and land, a documentary account by Daniel Defoe of the Great Storm of 1703 in England, is published anonymously in London by John Nutt.
- December – John Churchill, 1st Duke of Marlborough, arrives back in Britain after his victory at the Battle of Blenheim. The English architect and dramatist Sir John Vanbrugh is commissioned by Queen Anne to begin Blenheim Palace.
- unknown dates
  - A Tale of a Tub, the first major satire by Jonathan Swift (written 1694–1697), is published anonymously in London by John Nutt with The Battle of the Books as part of the prolegomena, running through three editions this year.
  - Antoine Galland publishes the first two volumes of Les mille et une nuits, the first translation of One Thousand and One Nights into a European language.

== New books ==
=== Prose ===
- Joseph Addison – The Campaign
- Mary Astell – A Fair Way with Dissenters and their Patrons (reply to Defoe)
- Willem Bosman – Nauwkeurige beschrijving van de Guinese Goud- Tand- en Slavekust (A new and accurate description of the coast of Guinea, divided into the Gold, the Slave, and the Ivory coasts)
- William Chillingworth – The Works of William Chillingworth
- Mary Davys – The Amours of Alcyippus and Leucippe
- Daniel Defoe
  - The Address
  - The Dissenters Answer to the High-Church Challenge
  - An Elegy on the Author of the True-Born English-man
  - An Essay on the Regulation of the Press (attrib.)
  - Giving Alms No Charity, and Employing the Poor a Grievance to the Nation
  - A Hymn to Victory
  - More Short-Ways with the Dissenters
  - A Review of the Affairs of France
  - The Storm
- John Dennis – The Person of Quality's Answer to Mr Collier's Letter
- "Dictionnaire de Trévoux" (Dictionnaire universel françois et latin)
- Andrew Fletcher – An Account of a Conversation Concerning a Right Regulation of Governments for the Good of Mankind
- Pierre Jurieu – Histoire critique des dogmes et des cultes
- White Kennett – The Christian Scholar (attrib.)
- Sarah Kemble Knight – The Journals of Madam Knight
- Charles Leslie – The Wolf Stript of his Shepherd's Clothing (against Defoe's Shortest Way)
- Paul Lucas – Voyage du Sieur Paul Lucas au Levant
- Bernard de Mandeville – Typhon
- Isaac Newton – Opticks
- Mary Pix – Violenta
- George Psalmanazar – An Historical and Geographical Description of Formosa (hoax)
- Matthew Prior – A Letter to Monsieur Boileau Depreaux
- Jonathan Swift
  - A Tale of a Tub
  - The Battle of the Books

=== Drama ===
- Thomas Baker – An Act at Oxford
- Colley Cibber – The Careless Husband
- William Congreve, John Vanbrugh, William Walsh – Squire Trelooby
- David Crauford – Love At First Sight
- John Dennis – Liberty Asserted
- George Farquhar – The Stage Coach
- Nicholas Rowe -The Biter
- Richard Steele – The Lying Lover
- William Taverner – The Faithful Bride of Granada
- Joseph Trapp – Abra-Mule

=== Poetry ===
- William Wycherley – Miscellany Poems
- See also 1704 in poetry

== Births ==
- January 1 – Soame Jenyns, English poet and essayist (died 1787)
- February 12 – Charles Pinot Duclos, French writer (died 1772)
- April – Thomas Osborne, English publisher and bookseller (died 1767)
- June 16 – Joseph Thurston, English poet (died 1732)
- June 22 – John Taylor, English classicist (died 1766)
- August 11 – James Miller, English playwright, poet and satirist (died 1744)
- unknown dates
  - John Adams, American poet (died 1740)
  - Yuan Mei (袁枚), Chinese poet, diarist and gastronome (died 1797)

== Deaths ==
- January 15 – Henry Herringman, English bookseller and publisher (born 1628)
- February 23 – Henry Noris, Italian church historian and theologian (born 1631)
- April 12 – Jacques Bénigne Bossuet, French writer (born 1627)
- June 18 – Tom Brown, English satirist (born 1662)
- July 9 – Yan Ruoqu (閻若璩), Chinese scholar and polymath (born 1636)
- July 24 – István Gyöngyösi, Hungarian poet (born 1620)
- August 19 – Jane Leade, English visionary and Christian mystic writer (born 1624)
- October 28
  - John Locke, English philosopher (born 1632)
  - Goodwin Wharton, English autobiographer and politician (born 1653)
- December 11 – Roger L'Estrange, English Royalist pamphleteer (born 1616)
- unknown date – Barbara Blaugdone, English Quaker autobiographer (born c. 1609)
