= 1814 in literature =

This article contains information about the literary events and publications of 1814.

== Events ==
- January 14 (January 2 O.S.) – The Imperial Public Library in Saint Petersburg opens to the public.
- January 26 – Actor Edmund Kean makes his London début in the leading rôle of Shylock at the Theatre Royal, Drury Lane.
- February 1 – Lord Byron's semi-autobiographical tale in verse The Corsair is published by John Murray in London and sells 10,000 copies on this day and over 25,000 in the first month, going through seven editions. His Lara, A Tale sells 6,000 copies on publication in the summer. Walter Scott is to say of Byron's poetry: "He beat me out of the field in description of the stronger passions and in deep-seated knowledge of the human heart."
- July 7 – Walter Scott's Waverley, his first work of fiction and a major early historical novel in English, is published anonymously by Archibald Constable in Edinburgh, a week after Scott finishes it. It sells out in two days.
- July 28–September 13 – The English poet Percy Bysshe Shelley abandons his pregnant wife Harriet Westbrook and runs away to France and Switzerland with the 16-year-old Mary Wollstonecraft Godwin, accompanied by her stepsister Claire Clairmont, also 16.
- August 24 – Burning of Washington (War of 1812): The British burn the original Library of Congress, at this time housed in the United States Capitol in Washington, D.C.
- September 12–15 – Battle of Baltimore (War of 1812): American lawyer Francis Scott Key, witnessing the bombardment of Baltimore, Maryland, from a British ship, writes "Defence of Fort McHenry". His brother-in-law arranges to have the poem published in a broadside with a recommended tune on September 17; on September 20 both the Baltimore Patriot and The American print it. The song quickly becomes popular – seventeen newspapers from Georgia to New Hampshire reprint it. In 1931, it is adopted as "The Star-Spangled Banner" as the national anthem of the United States.
- September 21 After arrangements have been made for the United States Library of Congress, destroyed in August's Burning of Washington, to be re-stocked by purchase of the personal library of ex-President Thomas Jefferson, Jefferson writes to Samuel H. Smith, saying that there is "no subject to which a Member of Congress may not have occasion to refer".
- November 29 – In London, The Times newspaper is printed using a revolutionary steam press for the first time. It runs at a rate of 1100 copies per hour.
- Late – The first edition of the second volume of the Brothers Grimm's Grimms' Fairy Tales appears, dated 1815.
- unknown dates
  - The earliest known printed Arabic language version of One Thousand and One Nights begins publication in Calcutta by the British East India Company.
  - Alfred de Vigny enrols as an officer in the Maison du Roi, the King's guard of Louis XVIII of France.

== New books ==
=== Fiction ===
- Jane Austen (anonymously) – Mansfield Park
- Fanny Burney – The Wanderer: or, Female Difficulties (last novel)
- Mary Brunton – Discipline
- Adelbert von Chamisso – Peter Schlemihls wundersame Geschichte (Peter Schlemihl's Miraculous Story)
- Selina Davenport – The Hypocrite
- Maria Edgeworth – Patronage
- Pierce Egan – The Mistress of Royalty
- Jane Harvey
  - Auberry Stanhope
  - Ethelia: a Tale
- Ann Hatton – Conviction
- Laetitia Matilda Hawkins – Rossane; or A Father's Labour Lost
- William Henry Hitchener – The Towers of Ravenswold
- Christian Isobel Johnstone – The Saxon and the Gaël
- Mary Meeke – Conscience
- Lady Morgan – O'Donnell
- Anna Maria Porter – The Recluse of Norway
- Regina Maria Roche – Trecothick Bower
- Walter Scott – Waverley
- Louisa Stanhope – Madelina: A Tale Founded on Facts
- Takizawa Bakin (Kyokutei Bakin, 曲亭 馬琴) – Nansō Satomi Hakkenden (南總里見八犬傳, The Eight Dog Chronicles, publication begins)
- Elizabeth Thomas – The Prison-House
- Jane West – Alicia de Lacy

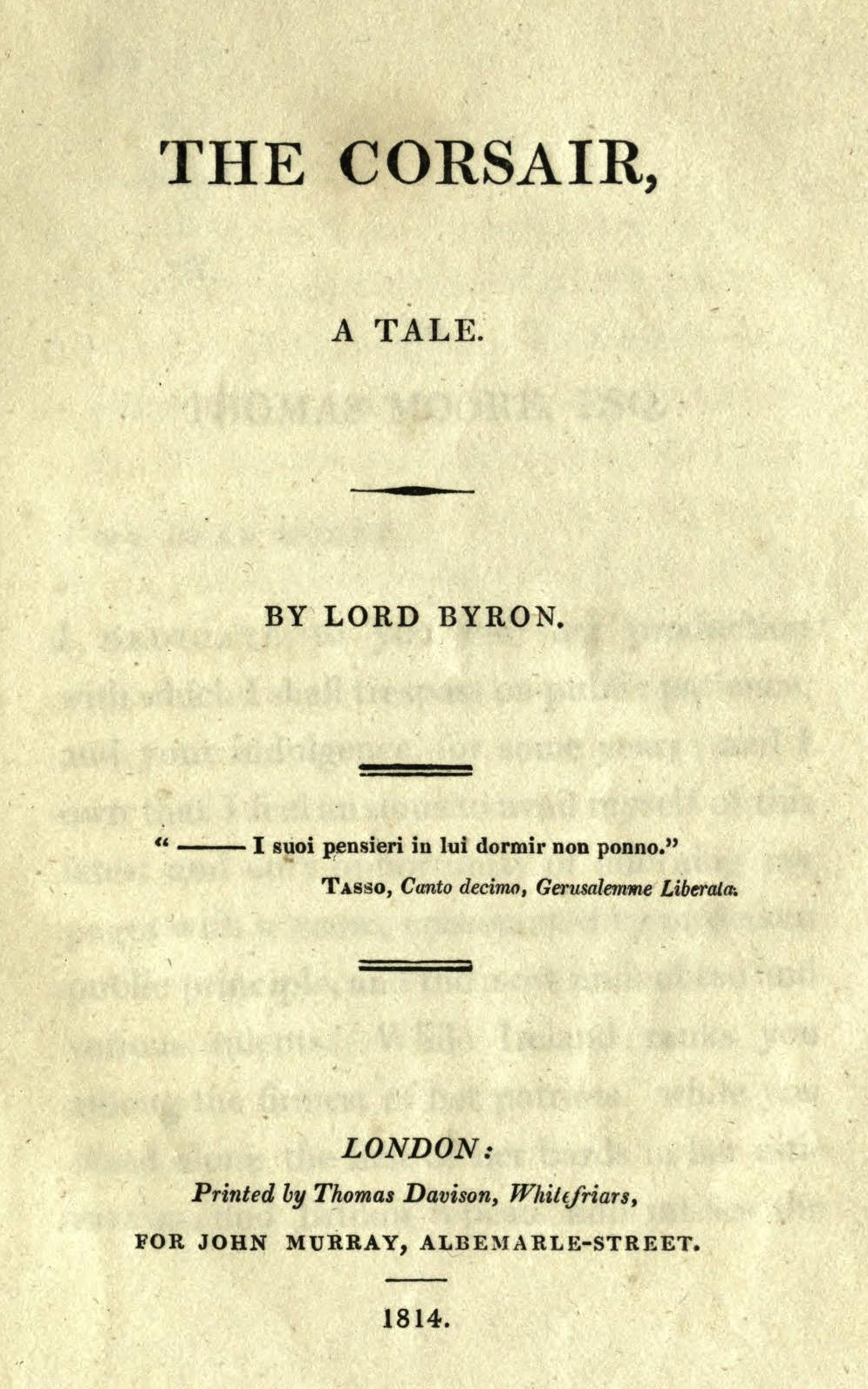

=== Children ===
- Maria Elizabeth Budden – Always Happy!!: Or, Anecdotes of Felix and his Sister Serena. A Tale
- Barbara Hofland – Emily and Her Friends
- Mary Martha Sherwood – The History of Little Henry and his Bearer

=== Drama ===
- Leigh Hunt – The Descent of Liberty
- René Charles Guilbert de Pixérécourt – The Dog of Montarges
- James Kenney – Debtor and Creditor
- Robert Francis Jameson – Love and Gout
- Richard Lalor Sheil – Adelaide
- Henry Siddons – Policy

=== Poetry ===
- Lord Byron
  - The Corsair
  - Lara
- Henry Cary – translation of Dante's Divine Comedy (complete in blank verse)
- Adam Oehlenschlager – Helge
- William Wordsworth – The Excursion

=== Non-fiction ===
- Elizabeth Craven – Letters from the Right Honorable Lady Craven to his Serene Highness the Margrave of Anspach during her travels through France, Germany and Russia in 1785 and 1786
- Thomas Hartwell Horne – Introduction to the Study of Bibliography
- Legh Richmond – The Dairyman's Daughter (religious tract about Elizabeth Wallbridge)
- Percy Bysshe Shelley – A Refutation of Deism
- Gotthilf Heinrich von Schubert – Die Symbolik der Traüme (The Symbolism of Dreams)

== Births ==
- January 15 – Pierre-Jules Hetzel (P. J. Stahl), French publisher and young people's writer (died 1886)
- January 17 – Mrs. Henry Wood (Ellen Price), English novelist (died 1887)
- February 18 – Samuel Fenton Cary, American author and prohibitionist (died 1900)
- March 9 (February 25 O.S.) – Taras Shevchenko, Ukrainian poet (died 1861)
- March 13 – Edward Backhouse Eastwick, Anglo-Indian orientalist and translator (died 1883)
- June 8 – Charles Reade, English novelist and dramatist (died 1884)
- July 23 – George W. M. Reynolds, English popular novelist (died 1879)
- August 14 – Charlotte Fowler Wells, phrenologist and publisher (died 1901)
- August 28 – Sheridan le Fanu, Irish Gothic writer (died 1873)
- September 17 – Ferenc Pulszky, Hungarian writer and politician (died 1897)
- October 3 – Mikhail Lermontov, Russian poet (died 1841)
- November 6 – William Wells Brown, African-American writer (died 1884)
- December 27 – Jules Simon, French philosopher (died 1896)

== Deaths ==
- January 4 – Johann Georg Jacobi, German poet (born 1740)
- January 21 – Jacques-Henri Bernardin de Saint-Pierre, French novelist and travel writer (born 1737)
- January 27 – Johann Gottlieb Fichte, German philosopher (born 1762)
- February 24 – Julien Louis Geoffroy, French literary critic (born 1743)
- February 27 – Margaret Bingham, English poet and painter (born 1740)
- April 12 – Charles Burney, English music historian and musician (born 1726)
- July 25 – Charles Dibdin, English novelist, playwright and actor (born 1745)
- September 5 – Gottfried Gabriel Bredow, German historian (born 1773)
- October 4 – Samuel Jackson Pratt, English poet, playwright and novelist (born 1749)
- November 10 – Abbé Aubert, French dramatist, poet and journalist (born 1731)
- December 2 – Marquis de Sade, French philosopher, writer and politician (born 1740)

== Awards ==
- Newdigate Prize – John Leycester Adolphus
