= 1740 in literature =

This article contains information about the literary events and publications of 1740.

== Events ==
- Autumn – John Cleland leaves government service in Bombay to return to Britain.
- November 6 – Samuel Richardson's epistolary novel Pamela; or, Virtue Rewarded is published anonymously in London in two volumes, rapidly becoming a popular work that inspires many imitations, translations and adaptations.
- December 20 – Start of a revival in the London theatre of Shakespeare plays featuring actresses in travesti roles, at the Theatre Royal, Drury Lane with Hannah Pritchard as Rosalind in As You Like It, a play not performed for at least 40, and probably nearer 100, years.
- unknown dates
  - Gabrielle-Suzanne Barbot de Villeneuve publishes La Belle et la Bête, the oldest known variant of the fairy tale Beauty and the Beast, in La Jeune Américaine, et les contes marins.
  - Thomas Witherby establishes a stationery business in London, specialising in printing and publishing for the marine insurance industry. By the end of the first decade of the 21st century, it will claim as the Witherby Publishing Group to be the oldest independent publisher in the English-speaking world.

== New books ==
=== Prose ===
- Johann Jakob Bodmer – Von dem Wunderbaren in der Poesie
- Thomas Carte - History of the Revolutions of Portugal
- Daniel Defoe (attributed) – The Life and Adventures of Mrs. Christian Davies, Commonly Call'd Mother Ross
- John Dyer – The Ruins of Rome
- Richard Glover – Admiral Hosier's Ghost
- David Hume – An Abstract of . . . A Treatise of Human Nature
- William Law
  - An Earnest and Serious Answer to Dr. Trapp's Discourse
  - An Appeal to all that Doubt, or Disbelieve the Truths of the Gospel
- William Oldys – The Life of Sir Walter Raleigh
- Thomas Pellow – The History of the Long Captivity and Adventures of Thomas Pellow in South-Barbary
- Antoine François Prévost – Histoire d'une Grecque moderne (The Greek Girl's Story)
- William Pulteney – An Epistle from L--- to Lord C-------d (supposedly from Thomas Coke to Lord Chesterfield)
- Samuel Richardson – Pamela; or, Virtue Rewarded
- Henry St John, 1st Viscount Bolingbroke – The Idea of a Patriot King (published after the intervention of Alexander Pope)
- Pu Songling (蒲松齡, died 1715) – Strange Stories from a Chinese Studio (possible date of first publication; includes "The Bookworm", "Dragon Dormant", "A Sequel to the Yellow Millet Dream", "Stealing Peaches" and "Zhang Hongjian")
- William Stukeley – Stonehenge: A temple restor'd to the British Druids
- Emanuel Swedenborg – Economy of the Animal Kingdom (Dynamics of the Soul's Domain) (1740–41)
- Gabrielle-Suzanne Barbot de Villeneuve – La Jeune Américaine, et les contes marins (introduces the tale Beauty and the Beast)
- William Warburton – A Vindication of Mr. Pope's Essay on Man
- George Whitefield – A Short Account of God's Dealings with the Reverend George Whitefield

=== Drama ===
- Baculard d'Arnaud – Coligny
- George Lillo
  - Britannia and Batavia
  - Elmerick
- James Thomson and David Mallet – Alfred: A Masque
- Tomás Añorbe y Corregel – Paulino

=== Poetry ===
- Sarah Dixon – Poems on Several Occasions
- Christopher Pitt – The Aeneid of Virgil
- See also 1740 in poetry

=== Non-fiction ===
- Colley Cibber – An Apology for the Life of Colley Cibber

== Births ==
- February 15 – Juan Andrés, Spanish historian (died 1817)
- June 2 – Marquis de Sade, French aristocrat, revolutionary politician, philosopher, and writer (died 1814)
- June 6 – Louis-Sébastien Mercier, French dramatist and writer (died j1814)
- June 27 – James Woodforde, English diarist and cleric (died 1803)
- August 18 – Giovanni Cristofano Amaduzzi, Italian philologist (died 1782)
- September 2 – Johann Georg Jacobi, German poet (died 1814)
- September 12 – Johann Heinrich Jung (Heinrich Stilling), German novelist and autobiographer (died 1817)
- September 17 – John Cartwright, English political reformer and naval officer (died 1824)
- October 29 – James Boswell, Scottish diarist, writer and autobiographer (died 1795)
- November 4 – Augustus Montague Toplady, English poet, theologian and hymnist (died 1778)
- November 21 – Charlotte Baden, Danish feminist and letter-writer (died 1824)
- Unknown dates
  - Margaret Bingham, English poet and painter (died 1814)
  - Jean-Louis de Lolme, Swiss writer in French and English (died 1806)
- Probable
  - Charlotte Brooke, Irish writer (died 1793)
  - Dionisie Eclesiarhul, Wallachian scribe, chronicler and illustrator (died c. 1820)

== Deaths ==
- January – John Adams, American poet (born 1704)
- April 12 – Samson Morpurgo, Italian rabbi, physician, and liturgist (born 1681)
- April 23 – Thomas Tickell, English poet and man of letters (born 1685)
- May 15 – Ephraim Chambers, English writer and encyclopedist (born c. 1680)
- June 1 – Samuel Werenfels, Swiss theologian (born 1657)
- June 5 – Johann Georg Abicht, German theologian (born 1672)
- July 20 – Joseph Sparke, English antiquary and editor (born 1683)
- October 5 – Johann Philipp Baratier, German scholar (born 1721)
- December 23 – Daniel Waterland, English theologian (born 1683)
