= Hitchener =

Hitchener is a surname, and may refer to:

- Elizabeth Hitchener (bapt. 1783 – 1821), British schoolmistress and poet
- Peter Hitchener (born 1946), Australian television presenter
- William Henry Hitchener (fl.1813), British author and actor
