= 1704 in poetry =

Nationality words link to articles with information on the nation's poetry or literature (for instance, Irish or France).

Now the Assembly [the Kit-Kat Club] to adjourn prepar'd,

When Bibliopolo from behind appear'd
As well describ'd by th' old Satyrick Bard,
With leering Looks, Bull-fac'd, and Freckled fair,
With two left Legs; and Judas-colour'd [red] Hair,
With Frowzy Pores, that taint the ambient Air.
Sweating and Puffing for a-while he stood.
And then broke forth in this insulting Mood:

I am the Touchstone of all Modern Wit,

Without my Stamp in vain your Poets write.
Those only purchase everliving Fame,

That in my Miscellany plant their Name.

—From William Shippen's, Faction Display'd, the work of a Tory poet on the powerful Whig publisher Jacob Tonson (Bibliopolo, or "book-seller") whose series of anthologies, known as Dryden's Miscellanies or Tonson's Miscellanies used the work of poets paid at low rates to create profitable income for Tonson and, sometimes, recognition and fame for the poets. Shippen incorporated three lines (in italics) written about Tonson by John Dryden, one of the most prominent of Tonson's low-paid poets.

== Works published ==
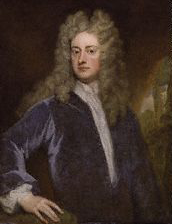
Joseph Addison, the "Kit-cat portrait", circa 1703–1712, by Godfrey Kneller

- Joseph Addison, The Campaign, published this year, although dated "1705"
- Edmund Arwaker, An Embassy from Heav'n; or, The Ghost of Queen Mary
- Daniel Defoe:
  - The Address
  - An Elegy on the Author of the True-Born English-man
  - A Hymn to Victory
- John Dennis, The Grounds of Criticism in Poetry, (criticism in prose)
- Bernard Mandeville, Typhon; or, The Wars Between the Gods and Giants
- Mary Pix, Violenta; or, The Rewards of Virtue, published anonymously; based on the eighth tale of the second day of Boccaccio's Decameron
- Matthew Prior, A letter to Monsieur Boileau Depreaux, published anonymously; about the Battle of Blenheim (August 13, 1704), and satirizing Boileau's Fourth Epistle to the King of France, 1672
- William Wycherley, Miscellany Poems

== Births ==
Death years link to the corresponding "[year] in poetry" article:

- January 1 – Soame Jenyns (died 1787), English writer and poet
- February 13 – Robert Dodsley (died 1764), English bookseller, poet, dramatist and anthologist
- April 30 – Jean Adam (died 1765), Scottish poet
- August 11 – James Miller (died 1744), English playwright, librettist, poet, satirist and clergyman
- December 17 (bapt.) – Moses Browne (died 1787), English poet and clergyman
- Also:
  - John Adams (died 1740), English Colonial American clergyman and poet
  - William Dawson (died 1752), English Colonial American clergyman, college president and poet
  - William Hamilton (died 1754), Scottish Jacobite poet

== Deaths ==
Birth years link to the corresponding "[year] in poetry" article:

- March 29 – Naitō Jōsō (born 1662), Japanese Genroku period haiku poet, a principal disciple of Bashō
- July 24 – István Gyöngyösi (born 1620), Hungarian poet
- September 7 – Benedetto Menzini (born 1646), Italian Roman Catholic priest and poet

== See also ==
- Poetry
- List of years in poetry
- List of years in literature
- 18th century in poetry
- 18th century in literature

== Notes ==
- "A Timeline of English Poetry" Web page of the Representative Poetry Online Web site, University of Toronto
