= Anyone Here Been Raped and Speaks English? =

1978 memoir by Edward Behr

Anyone Here Been Raped and Speaks English?: A Foreign Correspondent's Life Behind the Lines
- Author: Edward Behr
- Language: English
- Genre: Memoir
- Publisher: Viking Press
- Publication date: 1978
- Publication place: United States
- Media type: Print
- Pages: 316
- ISBN: 0241105293

Anyone Here Been Raped and Speaks English?: A Foreign Correspondent's Life Behind the Lines is a 1978 memoir by the British journalist and war correspondent Edward Behr.

== History ==
The titular quote is attributed to a television reporter for the BBC who shouted those words out to a group of Belgian nuns who had been airlifted from Stanleyville during the Congo Crisis in 1964. The anecdote is often cited as an example of the callousness of journalists pursuing a story and has been described as "the gold standard of journalistic insensitivity". The black humour and the shocking title of the book highlights journalists' interest in stories of victims and survivors of violence that carry emotional weight and exemplifies the intrusive and insensitive questions sometimes asked to the subjects of a story to grab the attention and morbid curiosity of their readers and viewers. The line has been widely used in discussions of ethics and journalism and to highlight the underreporting or erasure of events from international media coverage and discourse unless they can be expressed in the English language. The book covers Behr's experiences covering conflict in Asia and Africa in the 1960s and 1970s and as part of a group of journalists he called the Maghreb Circus.

== Release and reception ==
The book was published by Viking Press, New York in 1978 and by Hamish Hamilton in London. The American publisher forced Behr to change the title to Bearings: A Foreign Correspondent's Life Behind the Lines, which led to a decrease in sales. Behr reverted to the original title in subsequent editions, which again saw brisk sales. It has been described by multiple reviewers as one of the best books on journalism.

== In popular culture ==
Christopher Hitchens in his memoir described the motto of the foreign correspondent's desk at the Daily Express newspaper as being "Anyone here been raped and speaks English?".
