= History of journalism in the United Kingdom =

The history of journalism in the United Kingdom includes the gathering and transmitting of news, spans the growth of technology and trade, marked by the advent of specialised techniques for gathering and disseminating information on a regular basis. In the analysis of historians, it involves the steady increase of the scope of news available to us and the speed with which it is transmitted.

Newspapers have always been the primary medium of journalists since 1700, with magazines added in the 18th century, radio and television in the 20th century, and the Internet in the 21st century. London has always been the main center of British journalism, followed at a distance by Edinburgh, Belfast, Dublin, and regional cities.

== Origins ==
Across western Europe after 1500 news circulated through newsletters through well-established channels. Antwerp was the hub of two networks, one linking France, Britain, Germany, and the Netherlands; the other linking Italy, Spain and Portugal. Favorite topics included wars, military affairs, diplomacy, and court business and gossip.

After 1600 the national governments in France and England began printing official newsletters. In 1622 the first English-language weekly magazine, "A current of General News" was published and distributed in England in an 8- to 24-page quarto format.

== 16th century ==
By the 1500s, printing was firmly in the royal jurisdiction, and printing was restricted only to English subjects. The Crown imposed strict controls on the distribution of religious or political printed materials. In 1538, King Henry VIII decreed that all printed matter had to be approved by the Privy Council before publication. By 1581, the publication of seditious material had become a capital offence.

Mary I used the trade itself to control it. She granted a Royal Charter to the Company of Stationers in 1557. The Company became a partner with the state under Queen Elizabeth I. They advantaged greatly from this partnership as this restricted the number of presses, allowing them to keep their profitable business without much competition. This also worked in the favour of the Crown as the Company were less likely to publish material that would disturb their relationship because their privileges were directly derived from them.

Restrictions only became tighter in the printing industry as time went on. Edward VI prohibited 'spoken news or rumour' in his proclamations of 1547 to 1549. Royal permission had to be obtained before any news could be published, and all printed news was regarded as the royal prerogative.

The only form of printed news that was permitted to be circulated was the 'relation'. This was a narrative of a single event, domestic or foreign. These were printed and circulated for hundreds of years, often sold at the north door of St Paul's Cathedral. There were two categories of news being circulated here: items of 'Wonderful and Strange Newes' and government propaganda. The first category of news was often given eye catching titles to grab the reader with its sensational content.

== 17th century ==
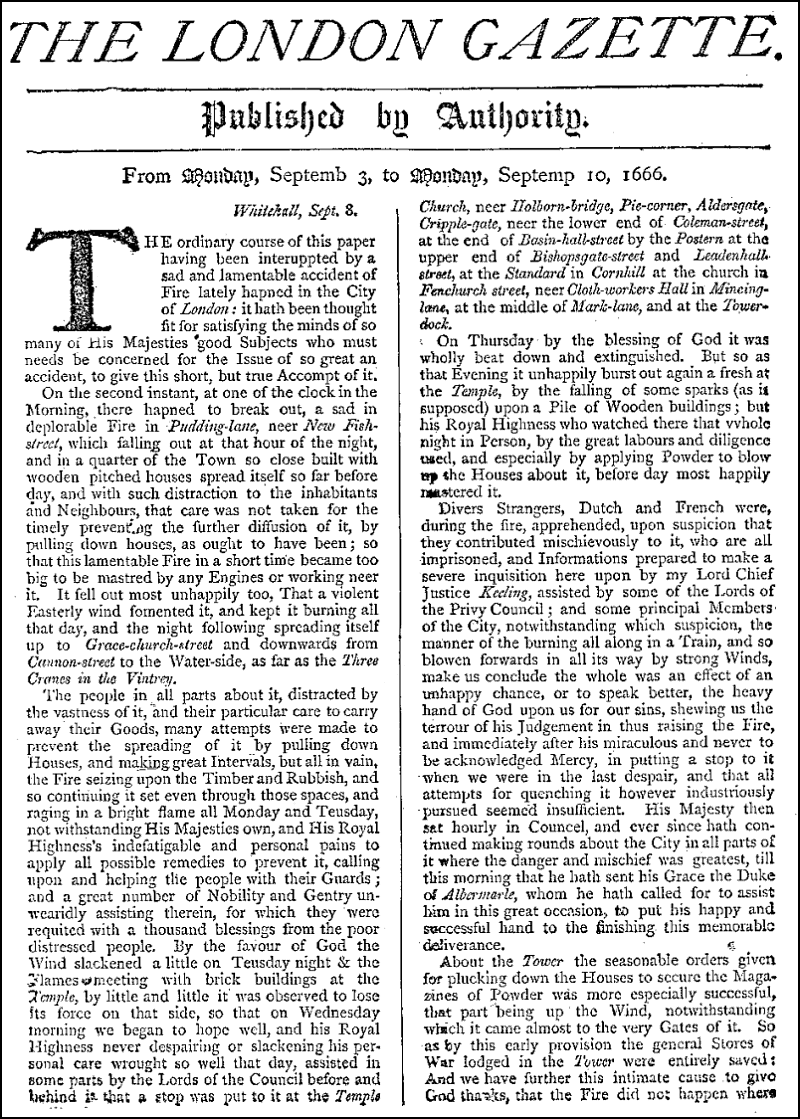
The London Gazette, facsimile front page from 3–10 September 1666, reporting on the Great Fire of London

The 17th century saw the rise of political pamphleteering fuelled by the politically contentious times of bloody civil war. Each party sought to mobilise its supporters by the widespread distribution of pamphlets, as in the coffeehouses where one copy would be passed around and read aloud. Holland already had a regular weekly news service, knows as corantos. Holland began supplying a thousand or so copies of corantos to the English market in 1620. The first coranto printed in England was likely printed by Thomas Archer of Pope's Head Alley in early 1621. He was sent to prison later that year for printing a coranto without a license. They were expensive and had low sales because people were more interested in issues in England rather than in Europe.

The Court of High Commission and the Star Chamber were abolished in 1641, and copyright laws were not enforced. The press was now free. Many people began to print their own newsbooks, free of any worry of prosecution, but only a few publications continued past the first few issues. Civil War era newsbooks contained information that affected everybody. They were available for a penny or twopence a copy. Some titles sold as many as 1,500 copies.

A milestone was reached in 1694; the final lapse of the Licensing Order of 1643 that had been put in place by the Stuart kings put an end to heavy-handed censorship that had previously tried to suppress the flow of free speech and ideas across society, and allowed writers to criticise the government freely. From 1694 to the Stamp Act 1712 the only censure laws forbade treason, seditious libel and the reporting of parliamentary proceedings.

The 1640s and 1650s were a fast-paced time in the history of British journalism. Because of the abolition of copyright laws, over 300 titles quickly came into existence. Many did not last, with only thirty three lasting a full year. This was also a time filled with war and fragmentation of opinion. The Royalists' main title was Mercurius Aulicus, Mercurius Melancholicus ('The King shall enjoy his owne againe and the Royall throne shall be arraied with the glorious presence of that mortall Deity'), Mercurius Electicus ('Communicating the Unparallell'd Proceedings of the Revels at West-minster, The Headquarters and other Places, Discovering their Designs, Reproving their Crimes, and Advising the Kingdome') and Mercurius Rusticus, among others. Most newsbooks in London supported the Parliament, and titles included Spie, The Parliament Scout and The Kingdomes Weekly Scout. These publication compelled the reader to take sides, depending on whose bias and propaganda they were reading.

There was also a series of semi-pornographic newsbooks produced by John Crouch: The Man in the Moon, Mercurius Democritus and Mercurius Fumigosus. These publications contained a mixture of news and dirty jokes disguised as news.

The huge and absolute freedom of the press came to an end with the Restoration. King Charles introduced the Printing Act 1662, which restricted printing to the University of Oxford and Trinity College, Cambridge and to the master printers of the Stationer's Company in London. It also required that only twenty were allowed to work in the master printers. This act provided the highly regulated and restricted environment that had previously been abolished.

The Oxford Gazette was printed in 1665 by Muddiman in the middle of the turmoil of the Great Plague of London and was, strictly speaking, the first periodical to meet all the qualifications of a true newspaper. It was printed twice a week by royal authority and was soon renamed The London Gazette. Magazines were also moral tracts inveighing against moral decadence, notably the Mercurius Britannicus. The Gazette is generally considered by most historians to be the first English newspaper.

Prior to the Glorious Revolution journalism had been a risky line of work. One such victim was the reckless Benjamin Harris, who was convicted for defaming the King's authority. Unable to pay the large fine that was imposed on him he was put in prison. He eventually made his way to America where he founded one of the first newspapers there. After the Revolution, the new monarch William III, who had been installed by Parliament, was wary of public opinion and did not try to interfere with the burgeoning press. The growth in journalism and the increasing freedom the press enjoyed was a symptom of a more general phenomenon – the development of the party system of government. As the concept of a parliamentary opposition became an acceptable (rather than treasonable) norm, newspapers and editors began to adopt critical and partisan stances and they soon became an important force in the political and social affairs of the country.

== 18th century ==
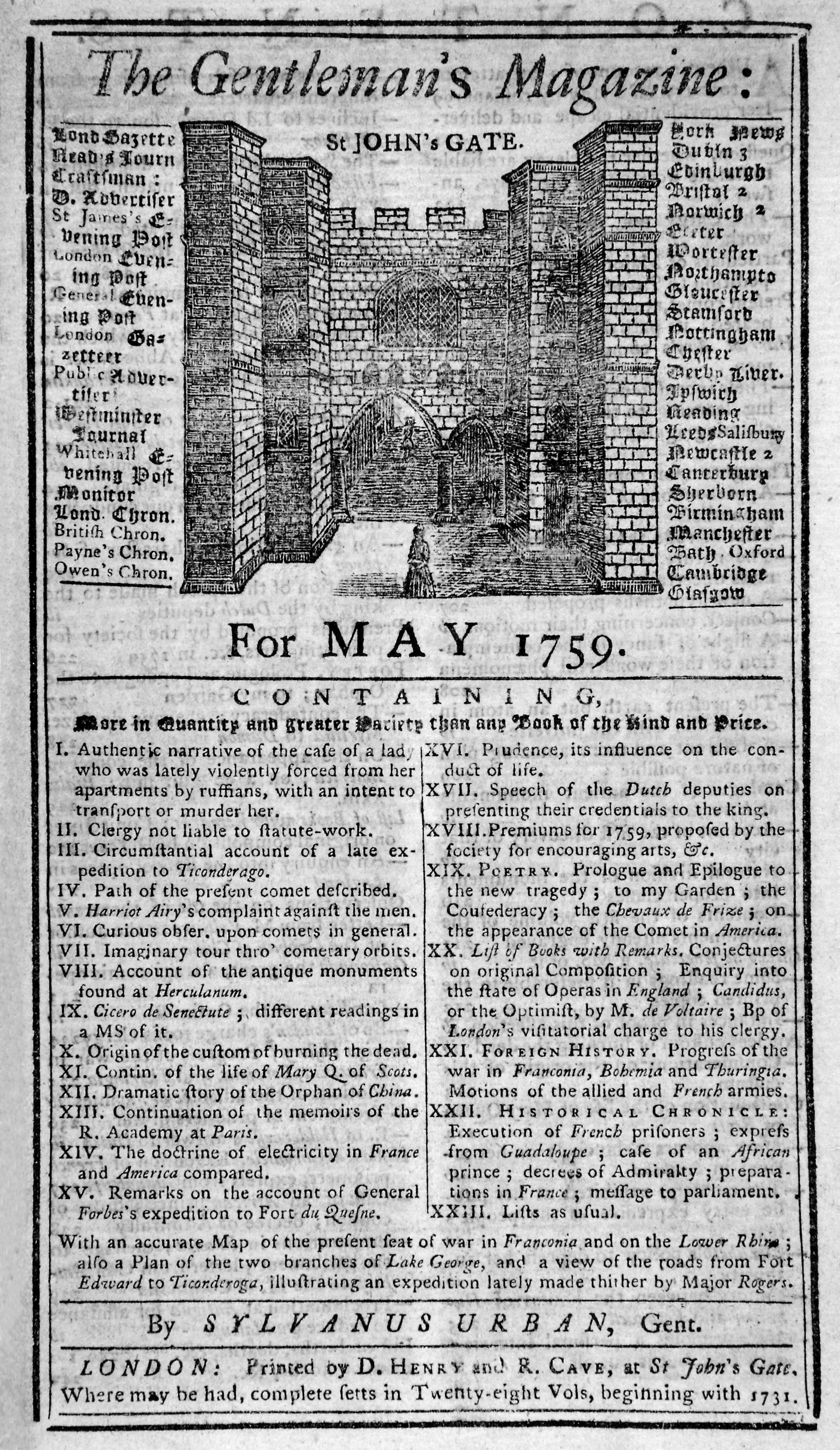
Front page of The Gentleman's Magazine, May 1759

By the beginning of the eighteenth century, Britain was an increasingly stable and prosperous country with an expanding empire, technological progress in industry and agriculture and burgeoning trade and commerce. A new upper middle class consisting of merchants, traders, entrepreneurs and bankers was rapidly emerging - educated, literate and increasingly willing to enter the political discussion and participate in the governance of the country. The result was a boom in journalism, in newspapers and magazines. Writers who had been dependent on a rich patron in the past were now able to become self-employed by hiring out their services to the newspapers. The values expressed in this new press were overwhelmingly consistent with the bourgeois middle class - an emphasis on the importance of property rights, religious toleration and intellectual freedom in contrast to the restrictions prevalent in France and other nations.

London's The Gentleman's Magazine, first published in 1731, was the first general-interest magazine. Edward Cave, who edited it under the pen name "Sylvanus Urban", was the first to use the term "magazine", on the analogy of a military storehouse. The oldest consumer magazine still in print is The Scots Magazine, which was first published in 1739, though multiple changes in ownership and gaps in publication totalling over 90 years weaken its claim. Lloyd's List was founded in Edward Lloyd's England coffee shop in 1734; it is still published as a daily business newspaper.

Journalism in the first half of the 18th century produced many great writers such as Daniel Defoe, Jonathan Swift, Joseph Addison, Richard Steele, Henry Fielding, and Samuel Johnson. Men such as these edited newspapers, or wrote essays for the popular press on topical issues. Their material was entertaining and informative and was met with an insatiable demand from ordinary citizens of the middle class, who were beginning to participate in the flow of ideas and news.

The newspaper was becoming so popular that publishers began to print daily issues. The first daily newspaper in the world was the Daily Courant, established by Samuel Buckley in 1702 on the streets of London. The newspaper strictly restricted itself to the publication of news and facts without opinion pieces, and was able to avoid political interference through raising revenue by selling advertising space in its columns.

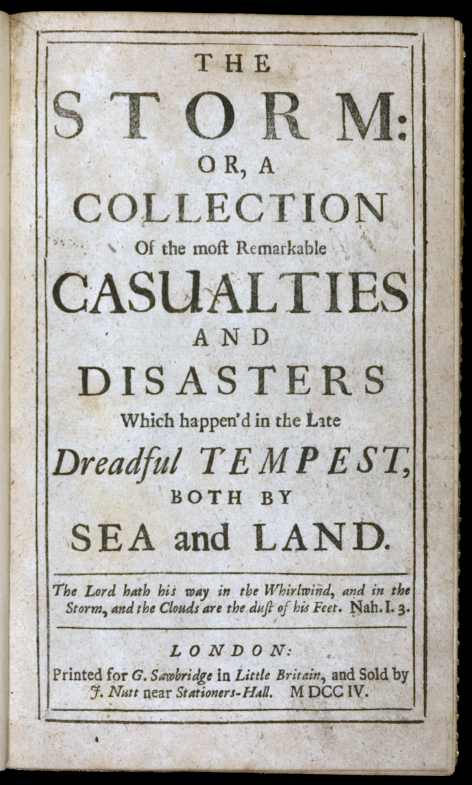
Daniel Defoe's The Storm, a report of the Great Storm of 1703 and regarded as one of the first pieces of modern journalism

Defoe in particular is regarded as a pioneer of modern journalism with his publication The Storm in 1704, which has been called the first substantial work of modern journalism, as well as the first account of a hurricane in Britain. It details the events of a terrible week-long storm that hit London starting Nov 24, 1703, known as the Great Storm of 1703, described by Defoe as "The Greatest, the Longest in Duration, the widest in Extent, of all the Tempests and Storms that History gives any Account of since the Beginning of Time."

Defoe used eyewitness accounts by placing newspaper ads asking readers to submit personal accounts, of which about 60 were selected and edited by Defoe for the book. This was an innovative method for the time before journalism that relied on first-hand reports was commonplace.

Richard Steele, influenced by Defoe, set up The Tatler in 1709 as a publication of the news and gossip heard in London coffeehouses, hence the title. It presented Whiggish views and created guidelines for middle-class manners, while instructing "these Gentlemen, for the most part being Persons of strong Zeal, and weak Intellects...what to think."

Jonathan Swift wrote his greatest satires for The Examiner, often in allegorical form, lampooning the controversies between the Tories and Whigs. The so-called "Cato Letters," written by John Trenchard and Thomas Gordon under the pseudonym, "Cato", were published in the London Journal in the 1720s and discussed the theories of the Commonwealth men such as ideas about liberty, representative government, and freedom of expression. These letters had a great impact in colonial America and the nascent republican movement all the way up to the signing of the Declaration of Independence.

=== Taxes on the press ===
The increasing popularity and influence of newspapers was unappealing to the government of the day. A duty was imposed in 1712 that lasted a century and a half at different rates covering newspapers, pamphlets, advertisements and almanacs. At first the stamp tax was a halfpenny on newspapers of half a sheet or less and a penny on newspapers that ranged from half a sheet to a single sheet in size. Jonathan Swift expressed in his Journal to Stella on August 7, 1712, doubt in the ability of The Spectator to hold out against the tax. This doubt was proved justified in December 1712 by its discontinuance. However, some of the existing journals continued production and their numbers soon increased. Part of this increase was attributed to corruption and political connections of its owners. Later, toward the middle of the same century, the provisions and the penalties of the Stamp Act were made more stringent, yet the number of newspapers continued to rise. In 1753 the total number of copies of newspapers sold yearly in Britain amounted to 7,411,757. In 1760 it had risen to 9,464,790 and in 1767 to 11,300,980. In 1776 the number of newspapers published in London alone had increased to 53.

An important figure in the fight for increased freedom of the press was John Wilkes. When the Scot John Stuart, 3rd Earl of Bute, came to head the government in 1762, Wilkes started a radical weekly publication, The North Briton, to attack him, using an anti-Scottish tone. He was charged with seditious libel over attacks on George III's speech endorsing the Paris Peace Treaty of 1763 at the opening of Parliament on 23 April 1763. Forty-nine people, including Wilkes, were arrested under the warrants. Wilkes, however, gained considerable popular support as he asserted the unconstitutionality of general warrants. At his court hearing the Lord Chief Justice ruled that as an MP, Wilkes was protected by privilege from arrest on a charge of libel. He was soon restored to his seat and he sued his arresters for trespass.

As a result of this episode, his popular support surged, with people chanting, "Wilkes, Liberty and Number 45", referring to the newspaper. However, he was soon found guilty of libel again and he was sentenced to 22 months imprisonment and a fine of £1,000. Although he was subsequently elected 3 times in a row for Middlesex, the decision was overturned by Parliament. When he was finally released from prison in 1770 he campaigned for increased freedom of the press; specifically he defended the right of publishers to print reports of Parliamentary debates. Due to large and growing support, the government was forced to back down and abandoned its attempts at censorship.

== 19th century ==
A series of developments 1850-1890 transformed the small closed newspaper world into big business. From 1860 until 1910 was the 'golden age' of newspaper publication, with technical advances in printing and communication combined with a professionalisation of journalism and the prominence of new owners. Political leaders tried to manipulate the press to a greater or lesser extent. Journalists paid more attention to leaders than to staffers, leading an advisor to tell Prime Minister Wellington in 1829 he should make his cabinet ministers responsible for secretly influencing or 'instructing' the friendly papers instead of a using a mere parliamentary secretary. Political journalists displayed an exalted view of themselves, as Lord Stanley noted in 1851:

They have the irritable vanity of authors, and add to it a sensitiveness on the score of social position which so far as I know is peculiar to them. Having in reality a vast secret influence, rating this above its true worth, and seeing that it gives them no recognised status in society, they stand up for the dignity of their occupation with a degree of jealousy that I never saw among any other profession.

Meanwhile, newspapers were also facing the pressures of advertisers whose power intensified following the removal of taxes on the press and implied control over newspaper content.

=== Taxes abolished ===
A pioneer of popular journalism for the masses had been the Chartist Northern Star, first published on 26 May 1838. The same time saw the first cheap newspaper in the Daily Telegraph and Courier (1855), later to be known simply as the Daily Telegraph. The Illustrated London News, founded in 1842, was the world's first illustrated weekly newspaper.

Reformers pressured the government and it repeatedly cut the high taxes on knowledge, including the excise duty on paper and the 5-penny stamp tax on each copy printed of a newspapers, pamphlet, advertisements and almanacs. In 1800 there were 52 London papers and over 100 other titles. The war with France was under way and the government wanted to suppress negative rumours and damaging information, so it tightened censorship and raised taxes so that few people could afford to buy a copy. In 1802 and 1815 the tax on newspapers was increased to three pence and then four pence. This was more than the average daily pay of the working man. However, coffeehouses typically purchased one or two copies that were handed around. In the 1830s hundreds of illegal untaxed newspapers circulated. The political tone of most of them was fiercely revolutionary. Their publishers were prosecuted but this failed to get rid of them. It was chiefly Milner Gibson and Richard Cobden who advocated the case in parliament to first reduce in 1836 and in 1855 totally repeal of the tax on newspapers. After the reduction of the stamp tax in 1836 from four pence to one penny, the circulation of English newspapers rose from 39,000,000 to 122,000,000 by 1854; a trend further exacerbated by technological improvements in transportation and communication combined with growing literacy. By 1861 all taxes had ended, making cheap publications reaching a large market feasible. For the first time it was financially attractive to plan for much larger circulations and therefore to invest in the new technologies which had been impractical before. Freedom from most taxes in the 1830s encouraged the launching of such titles. The Daily Telegraph, which appeared on 29 June 1855 and soon sold for 1 d. Sixteen new major provincials papers were founded, and older titles enlarge their scope. The Manchester Guardian, started out as a weekly in 1821, became a daily of 1855, as did the Liverpool Post and the Scotsman. The newspapers were stodgy affairs bringing great prestige and political influence to the closed network of families that owned them. The Times, edited by John Thadeus Delane stood preeminent.

=== Innovations ===
The new technology, especially the rotary press, allowed printing of tens of thousands of copies a day at low cost. The price of paper fell and huge rolls 3 miles in length of paper made from cheap wood pulp instead of expensive rags were fitted onto the Hoe rotary press. The linotype machine appeared in the 1870s and sped up typesetting and lowered its cost. The electoral franchise was expanded from one or two percent of the men to a majority, and newspapers became the primary means of political education. In the 1870s, the London newspapers were stodgy affairs pitched to public school graduates and other elite men.

=== New Journalism ===
Sensationalism, emphasizing dramatic stories, large headlines, and an emotional writing style was introduced by W. T. Stead, the editor of The Pall Mall Gazette (1883-1889). The New Journalism reached out not to the elite but to a popular audience. Especially influential was William Thomas Stead, a controversial journalist and editor who pioneered the art of investigative journalism. Stead's 'new journalism' paved the way for the modern tabloid. He was influential in demonstrating how the press could be used to influence public opinion and government policy, and advocated "government by journalism". Stead became well known for his reportage on child welfare, social legislation and reformation of England's criminal codes.

Stead became assistant editor of the liberal The Pall Mall Gazette in 1880 where he set about revolutionising a traditionally conservative newspaper "written by gentlemen for gentlemen." Over the next seven years Stead would develop what Matthew Arnold dubbed 'The New Journalism'. His innovations as editor of the Gazette included incorporating maps and diagrams into a newspaper for the first time, breaking up longer articles with eye-catching subheadings and blending his own opinions with those of the people he interviewed. He made a feature of the Pall Mall extras, and his enterprise and originality exercised a potent influence on contemporary journalism and politics. Stead's first sensational campaign was based on a Nonconformist pamphlet, "The Bitter Cry of Outcast London." His lurid stories of squalid life spurred the government into clearing the slums and building low-cost housing in their place. He also introduced the interview, creating a new dimension in British journalism when he interviewed General Gordon in 1884. His use of sensationalist headlines is exemplified with the death of Gordon in Khartoum in 1885, when he ran the first 24-point headline in newspaper history, "TOO LATE!", bemoaning the relief force's failure to rescue a national hero. He is also credited as originating the modern journalistic technique of creating a news event rather than just reporting it, with his most famous 'investigation', the Eliza Armstrong case.

Matthew Arnold, the leading critic of the day, declared in 1887 that the New Journalism, "is full of ability, novelty, variety, sensation, sympathy, generous instincts." However, he added, its "one great fault is that it is feather-brained."

=== The revolutionary: Alfred Harmsworth ===
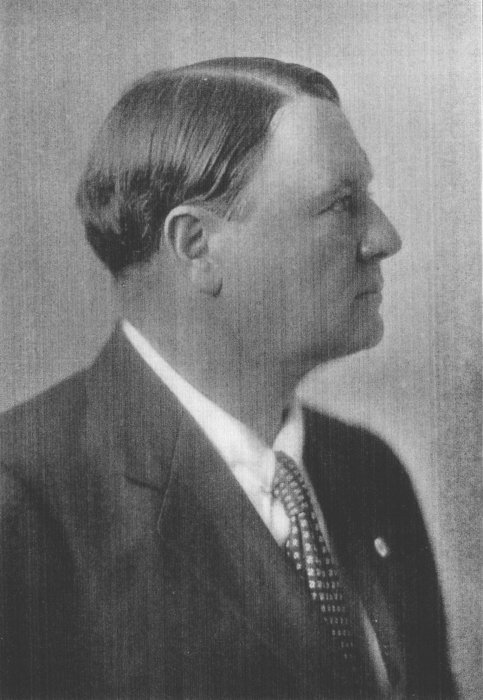
Alfred Harmsworth, 1st Viscount Northcliffe

Bringing all the factors together, a decisive transformation away from a high cost, low circulation elite newspaper world in the 1880s was the brainchild of Alfred Harmsworth (1865-1922). He closely studied the emergence of yellow journalism in New York, as led by William Randolph Hearst and Joseph Pulitzer. He realized that the money was to be made from not the cover price, which should be lowered to a halfpenny, but from advertisements. The advertisers wanted more and more readers—millions if possible—because they wanted to reach not only the entire middle class, but many well-paid members of the working-class. Harmsworth combined all the new technical innovations, with sensationalism, and a fixed goal of maximizing profits. Working with journalist Kennedy Jones, Harmsworth set up the Evening News in 1894, and in 1896 launched the morning paper, the Daily Mail. The new formula was to maximize the readership using sensationalism, features, illustrations, and advertisements pitched to women for department stores offering the latest fashions. Harmsworth scored an immediate triumph. The first year daily sales averaged 200,000, and in three years it sold a half-million copies a day. The prestige press did not try to catch up, for they measured success not by sales or profits but on prestige and power they wielded by dominating the news needs of the upper class British elite.

=== The Times ===
The Daily Universal Register published from 1785 and become known as The Times from 1788. In 1817 Thomas Barnes became general editor; he was a political radical, a sharp critic of parliamentary hypocrisy and a champion of freedom of the press. Under Barnes and his successor in 1841, John Thadeus Delane, the influence of The Times rose to great heights, especially in politics and in the financial district (the City of London). It spoke for reform.

Due to Barnes's influential support for Catholic Emancipation in Ireland, his colleague Lord Lyndhurst described him as "the most powerful man in the country". Journalists of note included Peter Fraser and Edward Sterling, who gained for The Times the pompous/satirical nickname 'The Thunderer' (from "We thundered out the other day an article on social and political reform.") The paper became the first in the world to reach mass circulation due to its early adoption of the steam-driven rotary printing press. It was also the first properly national newspaper, using the new steam trains to deliver copies to the rapidly growing concentrations of urban populations across the UK. This helped ensure the profitability of the paper and its growing influence.

The Times originated the practice for newspapers to send war correspondents to cover particular conflicts. W. H. Russell, the paper's correspondent with the army in the Crimean War of 1853–1856, wrote immensely influential dispatches; for the first time the public could read about the reality of warfare. In particular, on September 20, 1854, Russell wrote a missive about one battle that highlighted the surgeons' "humane barbarity" and the lack of ambulance care for wounded troops. Shocked and outraged, the public reacted in a backlash that led to major reforms.

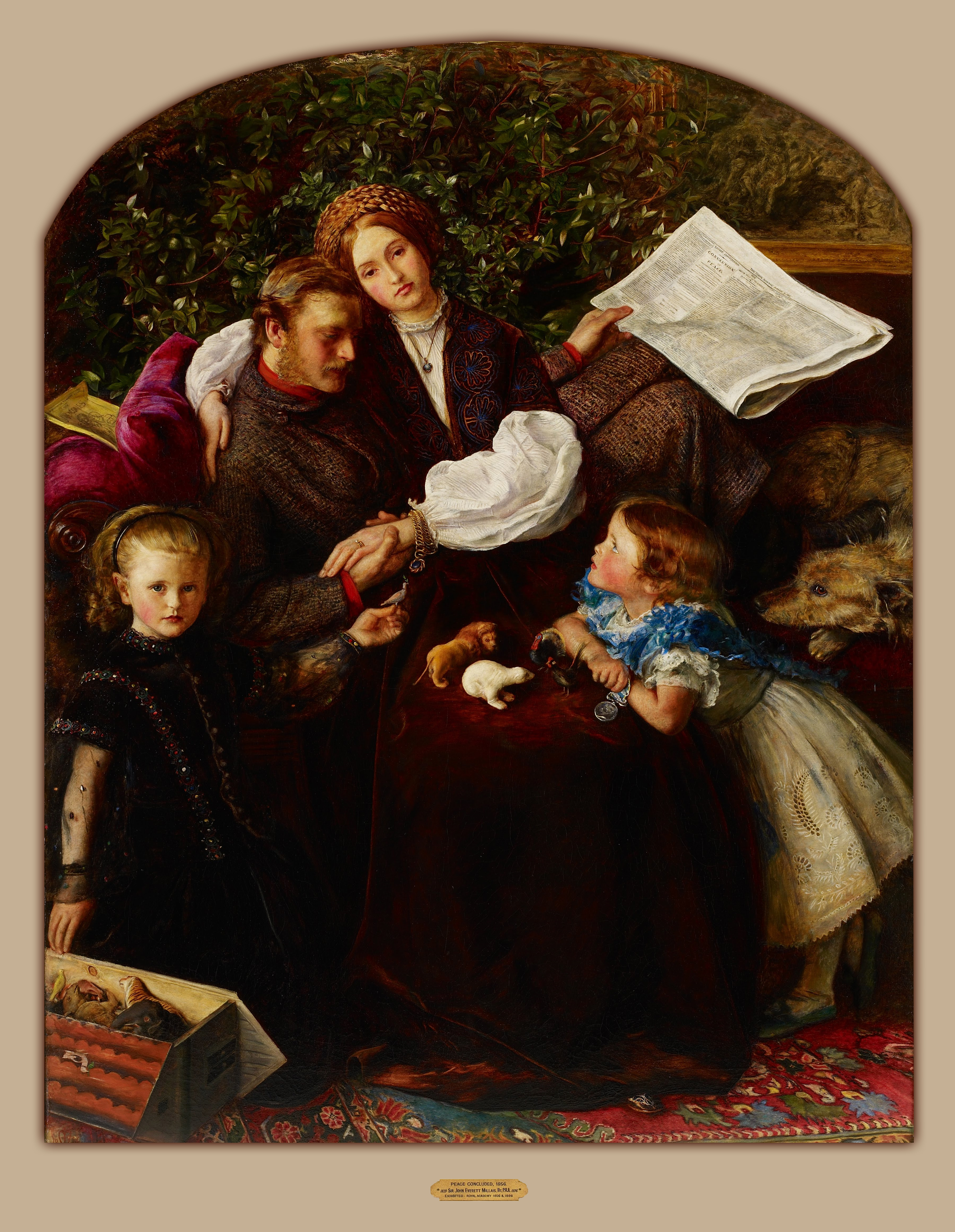
A wounded British officer reading The Times's report of the end of the Crimean War, in John Everett Millais' painting Peace Concluded, 1856

The Times became famous for its influential leaders (editorials). For example, Robert Lowe wrote them between 1851 and 1868 on a wide range of economic topics such as free trade (which he favoured).

In 1959, historian of journalism Allan Nevins analysed the importance of The Times in shaping the views of events of London's elite:

For much more than a century The Times has been an integral and important part of the political structure of Great Britain. Its news and its editorial comment have in general been carefully coordinated, and have at most times been handled with an earnest sense of responsibility. While the paper has admitted some trivia to its columns, its whole emphasis has been on important public affairs treated with an eye to the best interests of Britain. To guide this treatment, the editors have for long periods been in close touch with 10 Downing Street.

=== Manchester Guardian and Daily Telegraph ===
The Manchester Guardian was founded in Manchester in 1821 by a group of non-conformist businessmen. Its most famous editor, C. P. Scott, made the Guardian into a world-famous newspaper in the 1890s. The Daily Telegraph was first published on June 29, 1855, and was owned by Arthur Sleigh, who transferred it to Joseph Levy the following year. Levy produced it as the first penny newspaper in London. His son, Edward Lawson soon became editor, a post he held until 1885. The Daily Telegraph became the organ of the middle class and could claim the largest circulation in the world in 1890. It held a consistent Liberal Party allegiance until opposing William Gladstone's foreign policy in 1878 when it turned Unionist.

== 20th century ==
The 20th-century "popular press" had its origins in the street ballads, penny novels, and illustrated weeklies which preceded by many years the passage of the Elementary Education Act 1870. By 1900 popular newspapers aimed at the largest possible audience had proven a success. P. P. Catterall and Colin Seymour-Ure conclude that:

More than anyone [Alfred Harmsworth] ... shaped the modern press. Developments he introduced or harnessed remain central: broad contents, exploitation of advertising revenue to subsidize prices, aggressive marketing, subordinate regional markets, independence from party control. The Daily Mail held the world record for daily circulation until Harmsworth's death. He used his newspapers newly found influence, in 1899, to successfully make a charitable appeal for the dependents of soldiers fighting in the South African War by inviting Rudyard Kipling and Arthur Sullivan to write The Absent-Minded Beggar. Prime Minister Robert Cecil, Lord Salisbury, quipped it was "written by office boys for office boys".

Socialist and labour newspapers also proliferated and in 1912 the Daily Herald was launched as the first daily newspaper of the trade union and labour movement.

Newspapers reached their peak of importance during the First World War, in part because wartime issues were so urgent and newsworthy, while members of Parliament were constrained by the all-party coalition government from attacking the government. By 1914 Northcliffe controlled 40 per cent of the morning newspaper circulation in Britain, 45 per cent of the evening and 15 per cent of the Sunday circulation. He eagerly tried to turn it into political power, especially in attacking the government in the Shell Crisis of 1915. Lord Beaverbrook said he was, "the greatest figure who ever strode down Fleet Street." A.J.P. Taylor, however, says, "Northcliffe could destroy when he used the news properly. He could not step into the vacant place. He aspired to power instead of influence, and as a result forfeited both."

Other powerful editors included C. P. Scott of the Manchester Guardian, James Louis Garvin of The Observer and Henry William Massingham of the highly influential weekly magazine of opinion, The Nation.

== 21st century ==
Journalism expert Adrian Bingham argues that newspaper journalists are held in low repute. He cites one poll that found the trustworthiness of journalists on The Sun, Mirror and Daily Star fell far below government ministers and estate agents. Only 7% said they could be relied upon to tell the truth. Television journalists, scored much higher at 49%. Bingham list some popular complaints, but dismisses them as an inevitable long-term characteristic of the media:

The British popular press is repeatedly accused of being untrustworthy and irresponsible; of poisoning political debate and undermining the democratic process; of inciting hostility against immigrants and ethnic minorities; and of coarsening public life by promoting a sleazy and intrusive celebrity culture.

Bingham, however, states that in his view, there are serious problems:

The three main areas where the press is justifiably open to attack are: in failing to represent and respect the diversity of modern Britain; in privileging speed and short-term impact over accuracy and reliability; and in its reluctance to accept and reflect on the social responsibilities involved in popular journalism.

In 2005, the UK-based online newspaper PinkNews launched. It is marketed towards the lesbian, gay, bisexual and transgender (LGBT) community.

== See also ==
- Mass media in the United Kingdom
- List of magazines in the United Kingdom
- List of newspapers in the United Kingdom
- Banging out, a tradition in British newspapers relating to apprentices and retirees
