= Banging out =

British printing industry tradition

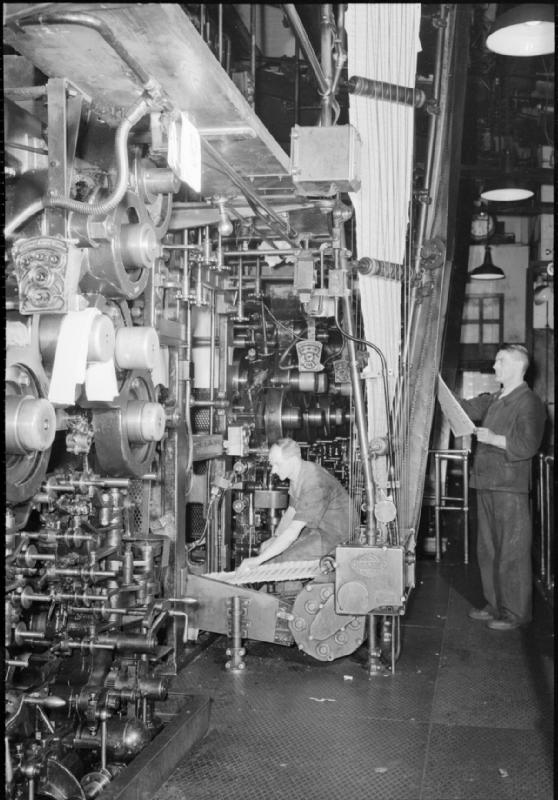
The press room of the Daily Mail in 1944

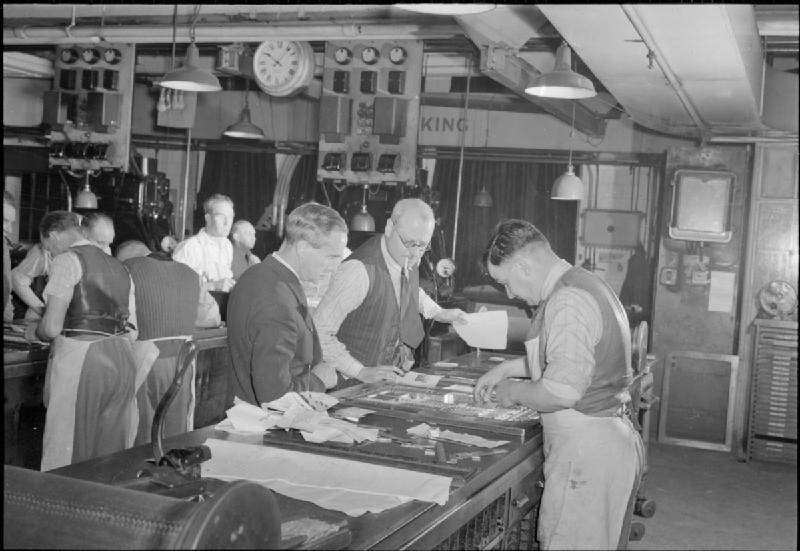
Metal desks in the Daily Mail composing room

Banging out is a British tradition that signifies the completion of an apprenticeship or the retirement of an employee. It is particularly associated with the printing rooms of national newspapers on Fleet Street, where the term "banging" refers to the noise created by colleagues striking metal furniture or machinery as the former apprentice or retiree walks across the shop floor. This tradition evolved when apprentices were placed in a truck and doused with printers' ink, glue, and paper, a practice that persists in some companies today. Although printing has been outsourced from newspaper offices, the banging-out tradition for retirees remains in modern newsrooms, with colleagues providing the noise by hitting their desks.

== Apprentices ==
The custom of banging out dates back to at least the 1910s in the British printing industry and is particularly associated with the production of national newspapers in Fleet Street, London. When a worker completed their apprenticeship, they would walk through the print room, and their colleagues would hit the metal furniture, machinery, and racking with hammers and other objects to a slow beat. It was also customary for the former apprentice to have a drink with each of his colleagues, which could be many in number. By the 1970s the ceremony included stripping the apprentice and placing him into a truck (a hand pushed cart). The former apprentice would be showered with ink, glue, paper shavings, rubbish and even cat food. The truck would then be pushed around the various departments of the printers and even into the street outside, where the apprentice might be tied to a lamp-post or similar. The ceremony continues to modern times in some companies, for example in 2012 a Reading print firm dressed an apprentice in women's clothes, covered him in ink and paper and paraded him down the town's High Street.

== Retirement ==
A banging out ceremony was also held to mark retirements. In newspapers, retiring employees would be walked through the print room by their colleagues whilst the printers hit their benches and machinery. The practice continues in some modern newsrooms. While the printing is now usually done offsite the newsroom staff provide the beat for the banging out by hitting their desks as the retiree walks out. Such a ceremony was performed en masse to mark the end of the print edition of The Independent in 2016. The tradition is also carried out in other industries, such as engineering. Banging out ceremonies were held to mark the closure of BAE Chadderton in Oldham in 2012 and the end of aircraft manufacture at Brough Aerodrome in December 2020.
