= Edward Behr (journalist) =

American foreign correspondent (1926–2007)

- Born: Edward Samuel Behr; 7 May 1926; Paris, France
- Died: 27 May 2007 (aged 81); Paris, France
- Education: Lycée Janson-de-Sailly; St Paul's School, London
- Alma mater: Magdalene College, Cambridge
- Occupations: Foreign correspondent, journalist
- Spouse: Christiane Behr
- Military career
- Allegiance: British Empire
- Branch: British Indian Army
- Service years: 1944 – 1948
- Rank: Brigade major (acting)
- Unit: Royal Garhwal Rifles
- Deployment: North-West Frontier

Edward Samuel Behr (7 May 1926 – 27 May 2007) was a foreign correspondent and war journalist best known for his many years of work for Newsweek.

== Early life ==
Behr's parents were of Russian-Jewish descent, and he had a bilingual education at the Lycée Janson-de-Sailly and St Paul's School, London. He enlisted in the British Indian Army on leaving school, serving in Intelligence in the North-West Frontier from 1944 to 1948 and rising to acting brigade major in the Royal Garhwal Rifles at the age of 22. He then took a degree in history at Magdalene College, Cambridge.

== Career ==
=== Reporting ===
His early career as a reporter was with Reuters in London and Paris. He then became press officer with Jean Monnet at the European Coal and Steel Community in Luxembourg from 1954 to 1956. Later he joined Time-Life as Paris correspondent, and in the late 1950s and early 1960s often covered the fighting in the Congo, the civil war in Lebanon as well as the Indo-Chinese border clashes of 1962. He wrote about the unrest in Ulster, the fighting in Angola and the Moroccan attack on Ifni, the Spanish enclave in West Africa.

Behr was often in Algeria, and in 1958 published The Algerian Problem. The book had the virtue of being written by a French-speaking outsider with some understanding of, and sympathy for, the positions of both the French and the Algerians. Written when the war was far from over, and going back a century or more over the background, it was considered a fair assessment of a problem which many Frenchmen reckoned no foreigner could possibly understand. The book was said to be compulsory reading at the United States Department of State.

Returning to India for Time, Behr served as bureau chief in New Delhi, travelled in Indo-China, then moved to the mass-circulation American magazine Saturday Evening Post as roving correspondent. In 1965 he went to Newsweek, the weekly news magazine owned by The Washington Post.

Operating from Hong Kong as Asia bureau chief, Behr wrote on China's Cultural Revolution, secured an interview with Mao Zedong and reported from Vietnam. The year 1968 turned out to be a hectic one for Behr: he was in Saigon during the Tet Offensive, in Paris for the student riots and in Prague when it was occupied by the Russians.

=== Biographies and television ===
Behr turned gradually from a career in war reporting to writing books and making television documentaries, including award-winning programmes on India, Ireland and the Kennedy family. A notable production was The American Way of Death, Behr's look at America's undertaking industry.

Later came a documentary for BBC1 on Emperor Hirohito, and the three-part Red Dynasty for BBC2 on the murders at the Tiananmen Square and the developments in communist China that led up to the massacre.

In his book Hirohito: Behind the Myth Behr went into the debate about what the emperor knew about war preparations, about the rape of Nanking, the Bataan death march, the Burma railway and Changi prison. Behr's case was that Hirohito knew as long ago as 1931 – when his troops took control of Manchuria in the putsch that became known as the Mukden Incident – what his military chiefs were doing; that he encouraged it; and that he was fully aware of their preparations for the Second World War.

In his book on the Ceauşescus, Behr said that the couple established a dictatorship more Byzantine than Marxist–Leninist. The title, Kiss the Hand You Cannot Bite, was a Romanian proverb.

In 1987 Behr wrote a biography of Pu Yi, the last emperor of China. The book, titled The Last Emperor, was inspired by a conversation between Behr and the British film producer Jeremy Thomas at the 1986 Cannes Film Festival, where The Last Emperor (produced by Thomas) was shown. Behr wrote in the "Acknowledgments" section of the book that "[h]e asked me whether I would be interested in writing a book connected with the film. I said that rather than write a 'book of the film' I wanted to try my hand at a serious biography of Pu Yi and his life and times". He further thanked Thomas for enabling him to "meet the surviving dramatis personae in Pu Yi's life".

In 1978 he published his memoirs. Memorably entitled Anyone Here Been Raped and Speaks English?, it was retitled for the American market as Bearings: A Foreign Correspondent's Life Behind the Lines.

In a thriller, Getting Even (1981), Behr used his foreign correspondent experience. He was the author (with Sydney Liu) of The Thirty-Sixth Way: A Personal Account of Imprisonment and Escape from Red China (1969), wrote a book on the musical Les Misèrables and collaborated on another about the making of Miss Saigon.

He also wrote Thank Heaven for Little Girls: The True Story of Maurice Chevalier's Life and Times (1993). He contributed regularly to American, French and British periodicals.
