= Gottfried Gabriel Bredow =

German historian (1773–1814)

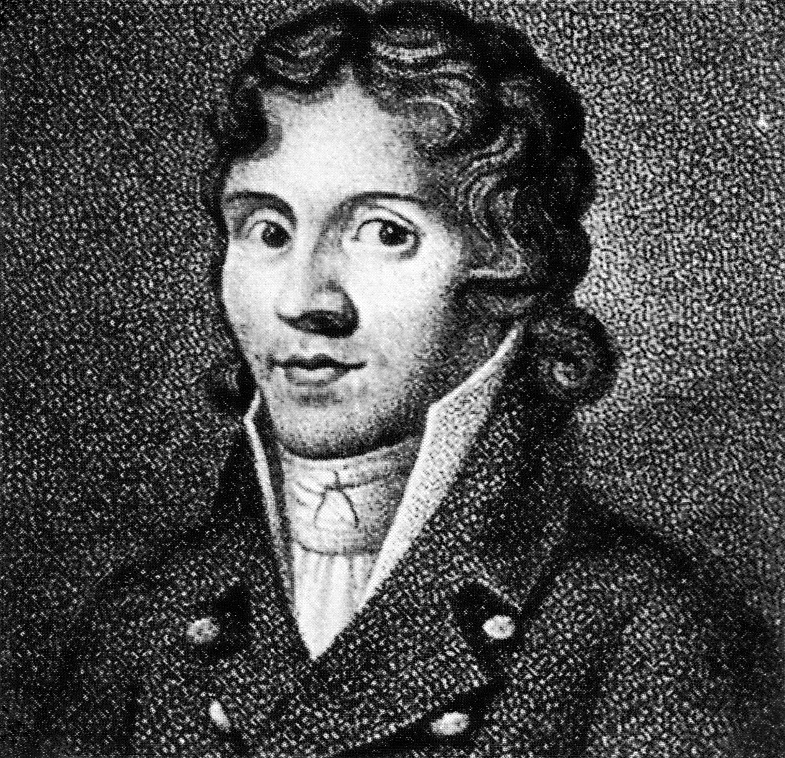
Gottfried Gabriel Bredow.

Gottfried Gabriel Bredow (14 December 1773 – 5 September 1814) was a German historian.

He was born at Berlin, and became successively professor at the universities of Helmstedt (1804), Frankfurt an der Oder and Breslau. He died at Breslau.

Bredow's principal works are Handbuch der alten Geschichte, Geographie und Chronologie (Eutin, 1799; English trans., London, 1827); Chronik des 17. Jahrhunderts (Altona, 1801); Entwurf der Weltkunde der Alten (Altona, 1816); Weltgeschichte in Tabellen (Altona, 1801; English trans. by J. Bell, London, 1820).

One known student was Johann Gottlieb Kunisch (1789–1852), teacher and author.
