= The Storm (Daniel Defoe) =

Pioneering 1704 work of journalism by Daniel Defoe

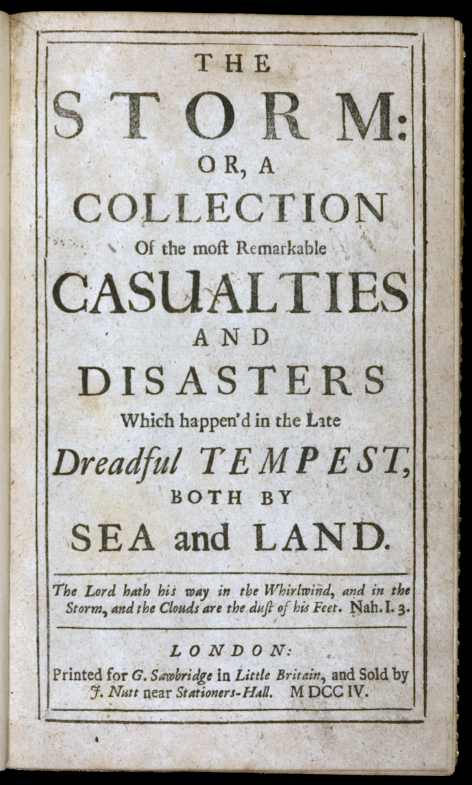

The Storm (1704) is a work of journalism and science reporting by the English author Daniel Defoe. It has been called the first substantial work of modern journalism, the first detailed account of a hurricane in Britain. It relates the events of a week-long storm that hit London starting on 24 November and reaching its height on the night of 26/27 November 1703 (7/8 December 1703 in the Gregorian Calendar). Known as the Great Storm of 1703, and described by Defoe as "The Greatest, the Longest in Duration, the widest in Extent, of all the Tempests and Storms that History gives any Account of since the Beginning of Time." The book was published by John Nutt in mid-1704. It was not a best seller, and a planned sequel never materialised.

== Collection of personal accounts ==
Within a week of the storm Defoe placed newspaper ads asking readers to submit personal accounts, of which about sixty were selected and edited by Defoe for the book. This was an innovative method for the time, before journalism that relied on first-hand reports was commonplace. Defoe considered the accounts reliable because "most of our Relators have not only given us their Names, and sign'd the Accounts they have sent, but have also given us Leave to hand their Names down to Posterity." The Storm has thus been called the first substantial work of modern journalism.

== Description of the storm ==
Defoe described the storm as "the tempest that destroyed woods and forests all over England". He wrote: "No pen could describe it, nor tongue express it, nor thought conceive it unless by one in the extremity of it." Coastal towns such as Portsmouth "looked as if the enemy had sackt them and were most miserably torn to pieces". He thought the destruction of the sovereign fleet, in which about one-fifth of the navy was lost, was a punishment for their poor performance against the Catholic armies of France and Spain during the first year of the War of the Spanish Succession.

"Most People expected the Fall of their Houses," wrote Defoe. Even so, they judged it safer to stay put than to seek new shelter: "Whatever the Danger was within doors, 'twas worse without; the Bricks, Tiles, and Stones, from the Tops of the Houses, flew with such force, and so thick in the Streets, that no one thought fit to venture out, tho' their Houses were near demolish'd within." Some of the first-hand accounts include that of Elizabeth Luck from Tunbridge Wells, who reported hundreds of trees fell down, a church lost its steeple, and two horses perished beneath a smashed stable. One Rev. James King of London told of a chimney that crashed through a house and buried a maid who was thought crushed dead, but then appeared the next morning from the rubble unharmed. Thomas Powell, a shopkeeper in Deal, was so appalled when his neighbours did not help rescue stranded sailors on a sand bar, he paid them five shillings for each rescued sailor; Defoe credited him with saving 200 lives. Defoe recounts another story of the captain of a ship who committed suicide rather than drown, only to have his ship rescued but too late for him.
