= The Descent of Liberty =

Masque written by Leigh Hunt

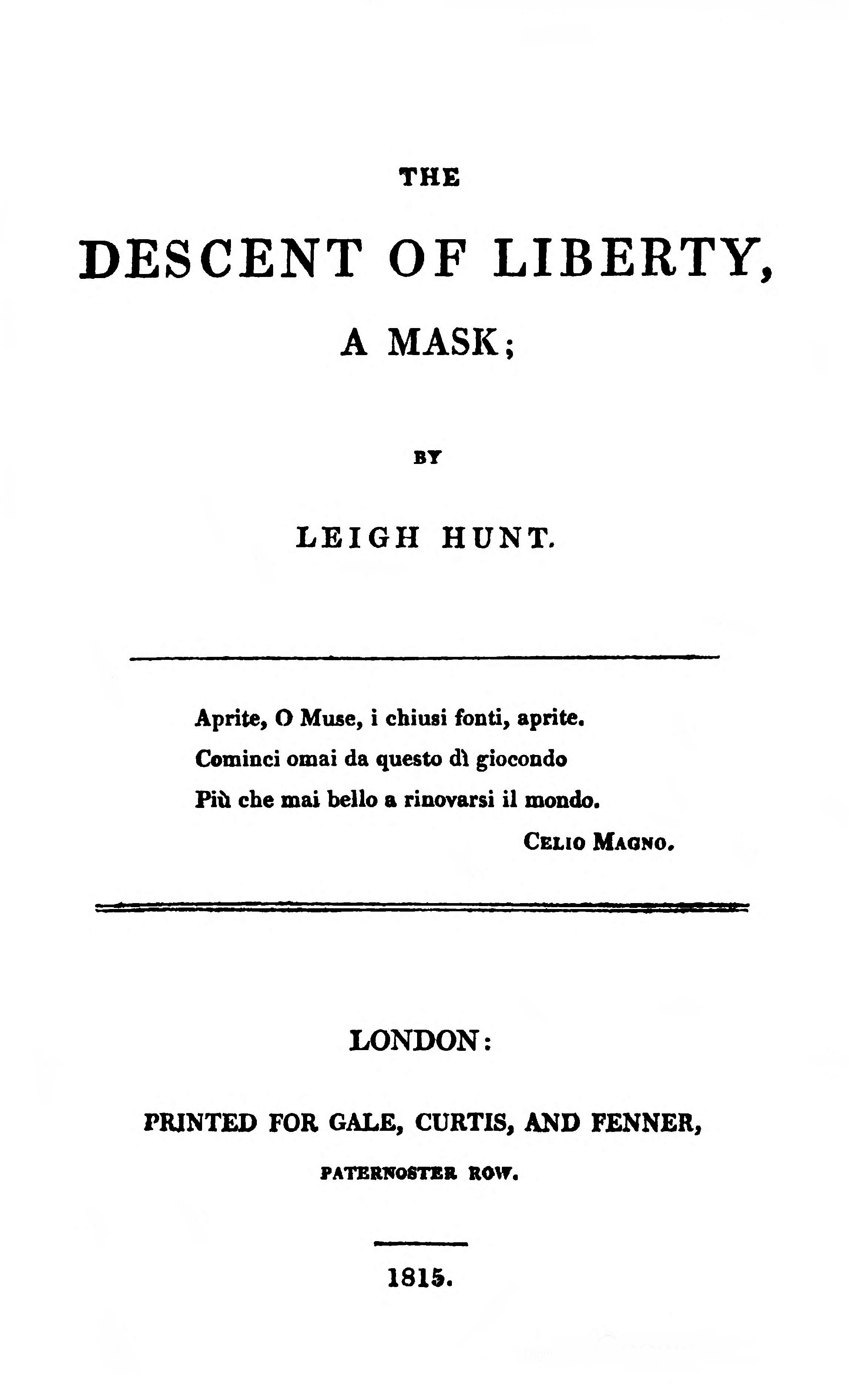
First edition title page

The Descent of Liberty was a masque written by Leigh Hunt in 1814. Held in Horsemonger Lane Prison, Hunt wrote the masque to occupy himself, and it was published in 1815. The masque describes a country that is cursed by an Enchanter and begins with shepherds hearing a sound that heralds change. The Enchanter is defeated by fire coming out of clouds, and the image of Liberty and Peace, along with the Allied nations, figures representing Spring and art, and others appear to take over the land. In the final moments, a new spring comes and the prisoners are released. It is intended to represent Britain in 1814, emphasising freedom and focusing on the common people rather than the aristocracy. Many contemporary reviews from both Hunt's fellow poets and literary magazines were positive, although the British Critic described the work as a "pert and vulgar insolence of a Sunday demagogue, dictating on matters of taste to town apprentices and of politics to their conceited masters".

== Background ==
During 1814, Hunt was held in Horsemonger Lane Prison, and many of his friends would come to visit him. To occupy himself when alone, he began writing a masque in order to keep busy. The play was finished during the summer, and it was later published in 1815. The work included a preface describing the "Origin and Nature of Masks". The section described how masques were started in Florence, Italy and how it was a high form of poetry. The masque tradition was stopped by Puritans during the 17th century. The work was intended to take an old form of poetry and turn it into a new form, and it was intended to challenge traditional beliefs about literature.

== Poem ==
The play describes a country that is cursed by an Enchanter and begins with shepherds hearing a sound that heralds change. The Enchanter is defeated by fire coming out of clouds, and the image of Liberty and Peace, along with the Allied nations, figures representing Spring and art, and others appear to take over the land. In the final moments, a new spring comes and the prisoners are released:

Warmth to set the prisoners free

Daisies with their pinky lashes,
And the marigold's broad flashes,
Hyacinth with sapphire bell
Curling backward, and the swell
Of the rose, full-lipp'd and warm,
Round about whose riper form
Her slender virgin-train are seen
In their close-fit caps of green

== Themes ==
The basis of the political themes is in the events of 1814 Britain. The play emphasized the freer and carnival aspects of the masque form instead of the courtly aspects. Furthermore, the masque represents freedom in terms of imagination and a more natural technique. In terms of form, The Descent of Liberty is different from standard neoclassical ideas about literature as it follows the style; there are mixes of prose along with poetry. As such, Hunt transforms the work from being traditionally aristocratic to emphasise the pastoral by focusing on the common people. The work can be seen as showing a triumph of the common people over those like Duke of Wellington and the Duke of York.

== Critical response ==
Hunt's friend John Hamilton Reynolds enjoyed the work. A review in the Augustan described how Hunt had "risen above the pressure of sickness and imprisonment, to the height of Poetry and Philosophy." The Critical Review described the work as a "politically poetical poem ... liberally pouring forth the effusions of patriotic zeal". John Scott, an associate of Hunt, claimed in the Champion that the "poetical prisoner, seated on a wooden bench, within hearing of the clank of fetters, and with a bare and monotonous brick wall before his sight" was able to create a work that was "full of healthful English feeling" and was "prima facie evidence in favor of the kind and pure character of [Hunt's] mind".

In a letter to Hunt from Henry Robertson and Charles Ollier, they said, "In our admiration of its abundant beauties we were unanimous, whether we viewed it for its fancy, for the fine human feeling that it excites, or for the grand abstractions that abound particularly towards the close of the poem. Our hearts and imaginations were alike delighted, and we found the true ends of poetry answered". Not all reviews were positive; The British Critic claimed that the work was a "pert and vulgar insolence of a Sunday demagogue, dictating on matters of taste to town apprenteices and of politics to their conceited masters".
