= Dragon Dormant =

- Short story by Pu Songling
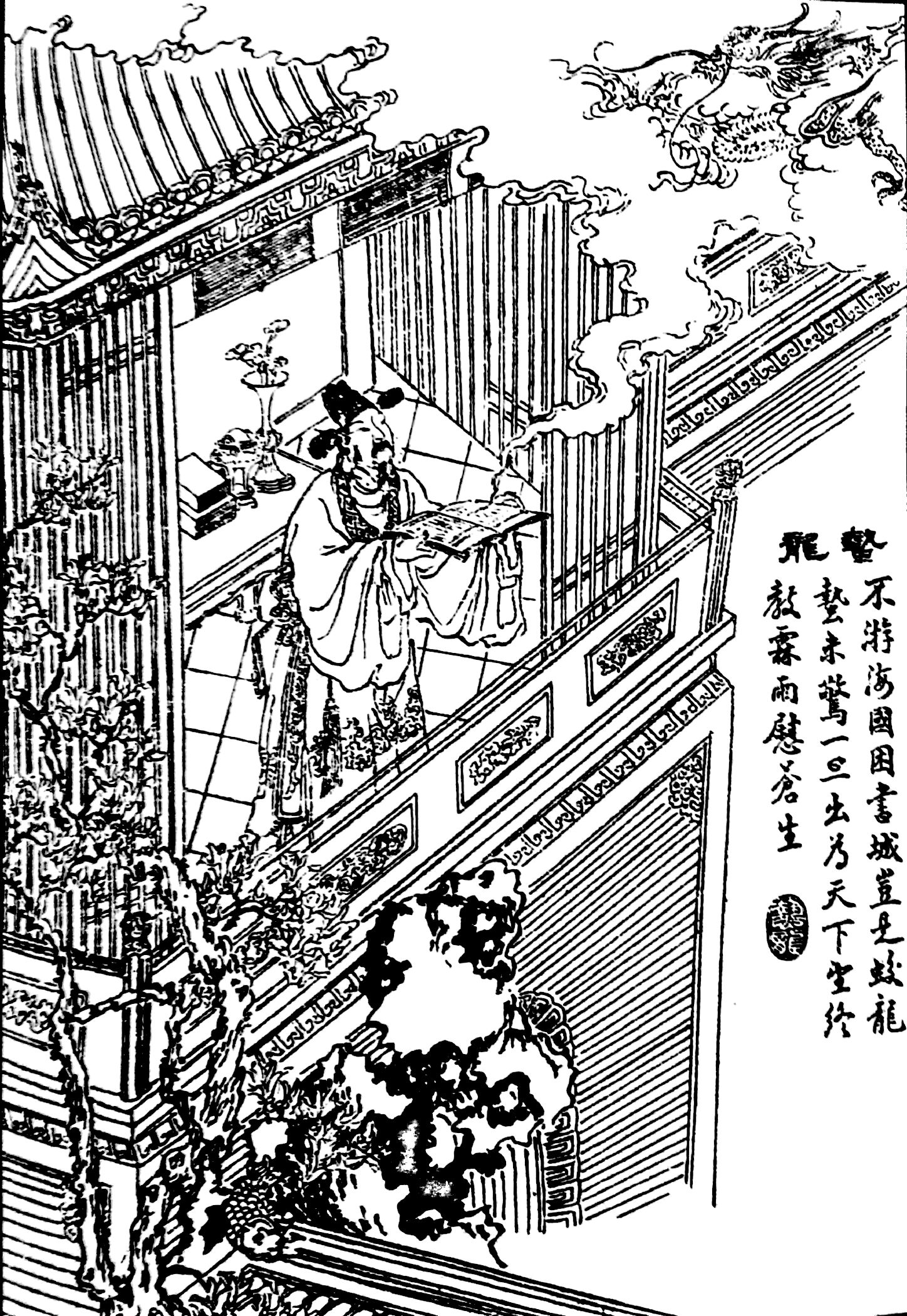
- 19th-century illustration from Xiangzhu liaozhai zhiyi tuyong (Liaozhai Zhiyi with commentary and illustrations; 1886)
- Original title: 蟄龍 (Zhelong)
- Translator: John Minford (2006)
- Country: China
- Language: Chinese
- Genres: Zhiguai; Chuanqi; Short story

Publication
- Published in: Strange Tales from a Chinese Studio
- Publication date: 1740

Chronology
| Xishu (戏术) | Xiaoji (小髻) |

"Dragon Dormant", also known as "The Hibernating Dragon" (simplified Chinese: 蛰龙; traditional Chinese: 蟄龍; pinyin: Zhélóng), is a short story by Chinese author Pu Songling collected in Strange Tales from a Chinese Studio (Liaozhai; 1740). The story is about a character named "Commissioner Qu" and his encounter with a supernatural creature in his study.

== Plot ==
Wuling County commissioner Qu is in his study reading when suddenly he spots a "little creature, bright as a glow-worm" on his desk. It slowly makes its way to one of Qu's books, after which he ascertains the creature must be a dragon. He attempts to rid the dragon, to no avail, although after a short while it flies away "with a rumbling roar". Qu retraces the slimy trail left behind by the being to "one of the bamboo boxes in which he stored his books".

== Publication history ==
Originally titled "Zhelong" (蟄龍), the story first appeared in Strange Tales from a Chinese Studio (1740) by Qing dynasty writer Pu Songling. The protagonist "Commissioner Qu, of Wuling County" is reportedly based on Qu Qianqiao, a Shandong commissioner in the "Office of Transmission" who earned his jinshi degree in 1577. A lithograph for "Dragon Dormant", first published in the 1886 Xiangzhu Liaozhai zhiyi tuyong (详注聊斋志异图咏; Liaozhai Zhiyi with commentary and illustrations), was hand-coloured by Steve Marking and used as the cover illustration for John Minford's 2006 Penguin Classics translation of Strange Tales from a Chinese Studio.

== Reception ==
Sidney Sondergard posits that the story, which she translates as "The Hibernating Dragon", is an example of Pu rewarding "his scholar characters by allowing them access with individuals and creatures not from the mundane world". Minford and Claire Roberts write in a column for the March 2008 issue of the quarterly circular China Heritage that "Dragon Dormant" allows for the "magical power contained within the scholar's library of books, and the latent energy contained within the written Chinese character, finds powerful expression".
