= Love and Gout =

1814 play

- Original language: English
- Written by: Robert Francis Jameson
- Genre: Comedy

Premiere
- Date: 23 August 1814
- Place: Haymarket Theatre, London

Love and Gout is an 1814 comedy play by the British writer Robert Francis Jameson. It was originally staged at the Haymarket Theatre in London's West End. It was considered successful with audiences.

== Bibliography ==
- Kozar, Richard & Burling, William J. Summer Theatre in London, 1661-1820, and the Rise of the Haymarket Theatre. Fairleigh Dickinson Univ Press, 2000.
- Nicoll, Allardyce. A History of Early Nineteenth Century Drama 1800-1850. Cambridge University Press, 1930.
- Valladares, Susan. Staging the Peninsular War: English Theatres 1807-1815. Routledge, 2016.
