= BAE Chadderton =

Coordinates: 53°32′46″N 2°8′33″W

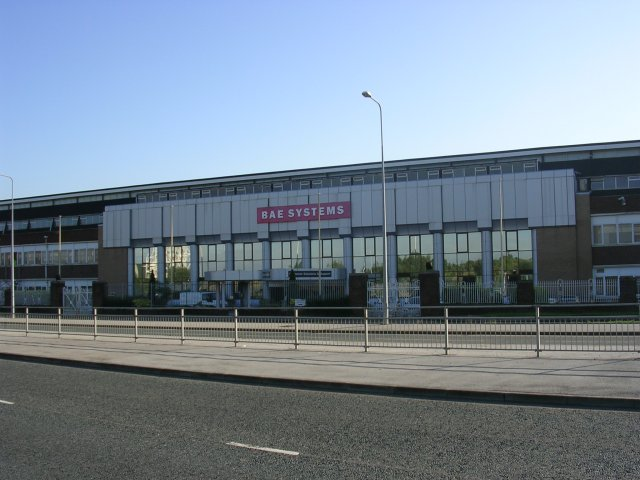
BAE Chadderton in 2005

BAE Chadderton at Greengate, Chadderton in the Metropolitan Borough of Oldham, opened in 1939. It was the headquarters of Avro, and was later owned by BAE Systems. It had around 11,000 employees.

The site was the birthplace of the Avro Lancaster. Over 3,000 Lancasters were produced on the site, which were moved to Woodford Aerodrome for assembly. It also produced the Bristol Blenheim under licence; the Avro Manchester; the York; the Lincoln; the Tudor; the Shackleton; and the Vulcan.

A substantial amount of Avro's documentation (including the original drawings of the Lancaster, Vulcan and Nimrod) were lost in a fire at Chadderton in 1959.

The site was closed in 2012, after BAE announced that it was no longer viable to operate from the site. At the time, BAE had 200 employees at the site. 160 employees, and ongoing work at the site, were transferred to Samlesbury Aerodrome.

The main Greengate site has since become home to NOV Process & Flow Technologies UK Limited, which manufactures the Mono range of industrial pumps as a division of Houston-based multinational NOV Inc. (formerly National Oilwell Varco). Part of the former BAE site alongside is now a purpose-built depot for DPDgroup parcel couriers.
