= Cock and bull story =

English phrase

"Cock and bull story" is an English-language idiom for a far-fetched and fanciful story or tale of highly dubious validity. It is often used to describe a description of events told by someone who is being deceitful or giving an excuse, perhaps unconvincingly. The first recorded use of the phrase in English was in John Day's 1608 play Law-trickes or Who Would Have Thought It:

What a tale of a cock and a bull he told my father.

== The inns on Watling Street ==
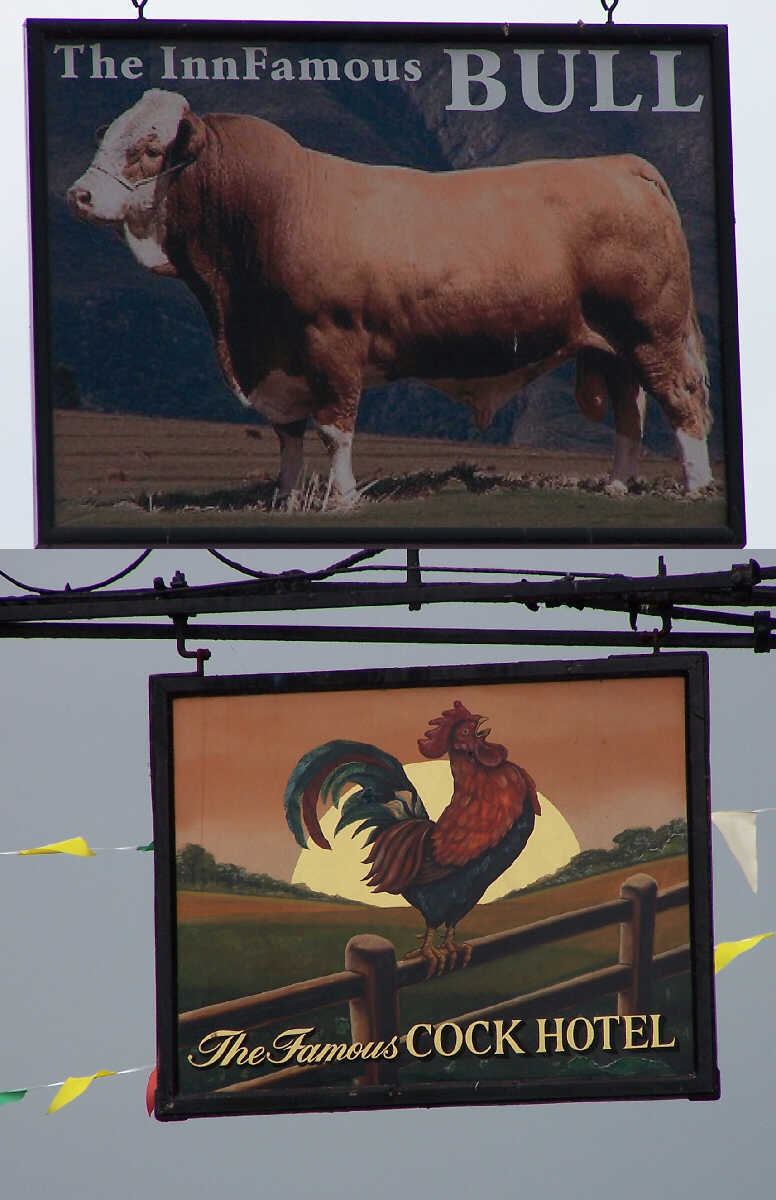
Pub signs of the Cock and the Bull

The Cock and the Bull inns in Stony Stratford were staging posts for rival coach lines on Watling Street, the London–Birmingham turnpike road. (Note: Stony Stratford is a constituent town of Milton Keynes in Buckinghamshire. Watling Street, subsequently called the A5 until the latter was diverted (twice) around the town, is Stony Stratford's High Street.) It is said that local people, regarding the passengers staying at the inns as a source of news, were told fanciful stories; there was even rivalry between the two inns as to who could tell the most outlandish story. These inns are still in existence: the Cock Hotel is documented to have existed [in one form or another] on the current site since at least 1470; the present building dates from 1742. The history of The Bull is less well documented but is certainly older than 1600; the present building is "late eighteenth century".

According to another source, the rival inns were in Fenny Stratford, a nearby town also on Watling Street, but no such hostelries exist there today.

There is no reliable support for the Watling Street etymology of the phrase and it is disputed as folk etymology.

== See also ==
- History of Milton Keynes#Turnpike roads
- Gulliver’s Travels by Jonathan Swift
- Baron Munchausen
