= Naitō Jōsō =

Japanese haiku poet

Naitō Jōsō (内藤 丈草; 1662 – March 29, 1704) was one of the principal disciples of Bashō, and himself also a respected haiku writer in the Genroku period of Japan. Originally, he was a samurai from Owari, but he had to leave military service due to ill health. Taking up the literary life, he became a devout disciple of Bashō, and when the Master died in 1694, Naito mourned him for a full three years, and remained his devout follower for the rest of his life.

== Examples of Naitō's Haiku ==
Mountains and plains/ all are taken by the snow --/ nothing remains

No need to cling/ to things --/ floating frog.

These branches/ were the first to bud --/ falling blossoms.

A lightning bolt/ splits in two and strikes/ the mountaintop.

The sleet falls/ As if coming through the bottom/ Of loneliness.
