= Elizabeth and John Nutt =

Married partnership of printers

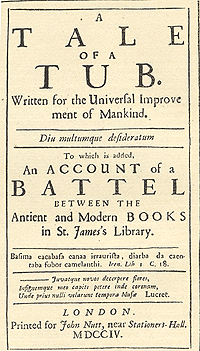
Cover of an original printing of A Tale of a Tub showing a printing credit for John Nutt

Elizabeth Nutt (c. 1666 – November 1746) and John Nutt (? – 1716) were printers and booksellers and distributors in London in the early 18th century. John Nutt's most famous publication was the first three editions of Jonathan Swift's A Tale of a Tub, but he and Elizabeth were important both as publishers and sellers of many works of English law and literature.

== Biographies ==
John Nutt remains an obscure individual, with only his death well attested in 1716. Elizabeth Carr married John Nutt in 1692, and she was at that time already a practicing "mercury," or seller of newspapers and pamphlets. Independent of her husband, she is referred to as a significant and honest seller by John Dunton in 1705. She therefore brought a retailing business to the marriage, and John brought a printing house. The couple lived in the Savoy off of the Strand in London for nearly all of their adult lives, and they sold books, pamphlets, and news sheets by the Royal Exchange.

John Nutt had a shop in the Savoy at least by 1705, when he published Swift's first major satire the year before (1703/4 and 1704). That same year, he obtained an exclusive patent to print law books. When John Nutt died in 1716, Elizabeth took over the printing business and had her son, Richard, manage the presses, and Richard took over the publication of legal writings in 1722. Elizabeth also worked with Anne Dodd, the most famous distributor of books of the day. She would print books and sell them to Dodd for retail sale, as well as sell them in her own stalls.

The Nutts were allied with Tory, Radical Whig and general opposition causes during the Hanoverian period, and she and her family were arrested for selling London Evening Post, which Richard Nutt published, The Craftsman, and Mist's Weekly Journal. Nevertheless, Elizabeth and her family prospered and extended their ownership of news shops, stalls, and book sellers. Her name continued to appear as a printer on imprints to 1741, and she is listed as a book seller until her death in 1746.

Between 1693 and approx. 1711, the couple had 13 children, including the printers Richard Nutt and Alice Nutt.

== See also ==
- David Nutt (publisher) – London publisher
- Alfred Nutt – English publisher and folklorist (1856–1910)
