= William Henry Hitchener =

British author

William Henry Hitchener was a British author and actor with the Surrey Theatre.

Hitchener published two books in 1813, St. Leonard's Forest, Vol. 1.2 (London Chapple 1813 ISBN 3-628-47673-9) and The Tower of Ravenwold, Vol. 1.2 (London Chapple 1813 ISBN 3-628-47674-7). Both books are travel books, and the latter was inspired by the melodramatic plays of the theatre.
