= John Adams (poet) =

American poet

John Adams (March 26, 1705 – January 22, 1740) was an American poet.

== Biography ==
Adams was the only son of merchant Hon. John Adams and Hannah Checkley of Nova Scotia, and he graduated from Harvard University in 1721. He joined the ministry of the Congregational Church at Newport, Rhode Island, on April 11, 1728, in opposition to the wishes of Mr. Clap, who was pastor there. Clap's friends formed a new society, and Adams was dismissed in about two years.

He was distinguished for his intellect and piety. As a preacher he was much esteemed. His uncle, Matthew Adams, described him as "master of nine languages," and claimed that he was conversant with the most famous Greek, Latin, Italian, French, and Spanish authors, as well as with the noblest English writers. He also speaks of his nephew's "great and undissembled piety, which ran, like a vein of gold, through all his life and performances."

Adams published a sermon on his ordination, 1728, and a poem on the love of money. He published two volumes of poetry: A Collection of Poems by Several Hands (1744), and Poems on Several Occasions (1745), which contains imitations and paraphrases of several portions of scripture, translations from Horace, and the whole book of Revelation in heroic verse, together with original pieces. The versification is remarkably harmonious for the period and the country. The following is an extract from his poem on Cotton Mather:

What numerous volumes, scattered from his hand,
Lightened his own, and warmed each foreign land?
What pious breathings of a glowing soul
Live in each page, and animate the whole?
The breath of heaven the savory pages show,
As we Arabia from its spices know.—
Ambitious, active, towering was his soul,
But flaming piety inspired the whole.

— Massa.-mag. for April 1789; Backus' hist. abr. 158; Pref. to his poems; Specimens of Amer. poetry, I. 67.

He died at Cambridge, Massachusetts on January 22, 1740, at the age of 36, deeply lamented by his acquaintance.
