= 1656 in literature =

This article contains information about the literary events and publications of 1656.

== Events ==
- April 25 – In London, the Council of State, usually busy with larger matters, has taken on the censorship of individual books and orders Robert Tichborne, the Lord Mayor of the City of London, to burn a volume entitled Sportive Wit, or the Muses' Merriment for its "scandalous, lascivious, scurrilous, and profane matter".
- May 9 – Choice Drollery, Songs, and Sonnets is ordered to be destroyed by Britain's Council of State.
- May – The Siege of Rhodes, Part I, by Sir William Davenant, the "first English opera" (under the guise of a recitative), is performed in a private theatre at his home, Rutland House, in the City of London. This includes the innovative use of painted backdrops and the appearance of England's first professional actress, Mrs. Coleman as Ianthe.
- July 27 – Baruch Spinoza is excluded from the Jewish religious community in Amsterdam.
- November 12 – John Milton marries Katherine Woodcock at St Mary Aldermanbury, London.
- unknown date – Two playbooks of old plays published in London in this year, The Careless Shepherdess and The Old Law, contain the first "play lists" or catalogs of published dramas ever issued in England.

== New books ==
=== Prose ===
- Cyrano de Bergerac – Comical History of the States and Empires of the Moon
- Thomas Blount – Glossographia; or, a dictionary interpreting the hard words of whatsoever language now used in our refined English tongue
- Méric Casaubon – A Treatise Concerning Enthusiasm
- Margaret Cavendish
  - A True Relation of my Birth, Breeding, and Life
  - Nature's Pictures
- William Dugdale – Antiquities of Warwickshire (seen as a model for a county history)
- James Harrington – The Commonwealth of Oceana
- Thomas Hobbes – Questions concerning Liberty, Necessity and Chance
- Michael Maier – Themis aurea: the Laws of the Fraternity of the Rosie Crosse (first English translation)
- Marchamont Nedham – The Excellency of a Free State
- Adam Olearius – Vermehrte Newe Beschreibung Der Muscowitischen und Persischen Reyse So durch gelegenheit einer Holsteinischen Gesandtschaft an den Russischen Zaar und König in Persien geschehen (Further new description of the Muscovite and Persian journey made on the occasion of a Holstein mission to the Russian Tsar and the King of Persia)
- Francis Osborne – Advice to a Son (an anti-marriage book, condemned and burned for immorality)
- Blaise Pascal (as Louis de Montalte) – Lettres provinciales (first letter in series, completed March 1657)
- John Tradescant the Younger – Musæum Tradescantianum; or, a collection of rarities preserved at South-Lambeth neer London (descriptive catalog of museum)
- Gerrard Winstanley – The Law of Freedom

=== Children ===
- John Cotton – Spiritual Milk for Boston Babes (catechism)

=== Drama ===
- Thomas Dekker (died 1632) and John Ford (died c. 1639) – The Sun's Darling (masque, 1624, publication)
- Thomas Goffe (died 1629) – publication:
  - Three Excellent Tragedies (c. 1613–1618)
  - The Careless Shepherdess (c. 1625; attributed)
- Thomas Middleton (died 1627), William Rowley (died 1626) and Philip Massinger (died 1640) – The Old Law (c. 1616, publication)
- Molière – Le Dépit amoureux

=== Poetry ===
- Pierre Corneille – L'Imitation de Jésus-Christ
- Abraham Cowley – The Miscellanies
- William Davenant – Wit and Drollery: Jovial Poems
- Andreas Gryphius – Kirchhofsgedanken (Cemetery thoughts)

== Births ==
- January 1 – Silvester Jenks, English Catholic theologian and philosopher (died 1714)
- April 17 – William Molyneux, Irish natural philosopher and political writer (died 1698)
- August 3 – Jean Galbert de Campistron, French dramatist (died 1723)
- September 14 – Thomas Baker, English antiquary (died 1746)
- November 17 – Charles Davenant, English economist (died 1714)

== Deaths ==
- January 19 – Godfrey Goodman, English theologian and bishop (born c. 1582)
- August 24 – Aegidius Gelenius, German historian (born 1595)
- September 8 – Bishop Joseph Hall, English satirist (born 1574)
- October 3 – Myles Standish, American colonist (born c. 1584)
- December – John Edwards (Siôn Treredyn), Welsh Anglican priest and translator (born c. 1605)
- unknown date – Thomas Gage, English writer and cleric (born c. 1597)
