= Richard Meighen =

English publisher

Richard Meighen (died 1641) was a London publisher of the Jacobean and Caroline eras. He is noted for his publications of plays of English Renaissance drama; he published the second Ben Jonson folio of 1640/41, and was a member of the syndicate that issued the Second Folio of Shakespeare's collected plays in 1632.

== Life and career ==
Meighen came from a family with strong connections to Shrewsbury School; his father, John Meighen (son of a Richard Meighen who was a tanner in Shrewsbury), was named headmaster in 1583 and continued in the post for a remarkable 52 years, until his death in September 1635. Several members of the Meighen family (including at least two named Richard) attended the school as students. Meighen the publisher maintained a lifelong connection with the school, and published works relating to it.

Meighen was active as a publisher during the years 1615 to 1641; his shops, as his title pages specify, were "under St. Clement's Church" in the Strand, and "next to the Middle Temple, in Fleet Street." He started his career on a prestigious note, acting as William Stansby's sales agent when Stansby printed and published the first Jonson folio in 1616. Like many stationers of his era, Meighen concentrated on publishing and selling books, and commissioned printers to print the works he published. His first edition of William Slater's Palae-Albion: The History of Great Britain (1621), for example, was printed by Stansby — though Meighen also worked with most of the printers of his generation.

== Drama ==
While he issued a wide range of works of various types — including an edition of John Stow's Annals in 1631 — Meighen's volumes of drama are his most significant works, judged in retrospect. Meighen appears to have been only a minor partner in the 1632 Shakespeare Second Folio (he'd obtained the rights to The Merry Wives of Windsor in 1630); but he was a prime mover of the 1640/41 Jonson volume, which collected most of the post-1616 plays, masques, and miscellaneous works of the poet/dramatist. In publishing this volume, Meighen collaborated with Philip Chetwinde, who would publish the Shakespeare Third Folio of 1663/64. William Stansby, the printer/publisher of the first Jonson folio, also printed the second.

In addition to the Shakespeare and Jonson folios, Meighen published a number of plays in single editions, including:

- the first quarto of the anonymous Swetnam the Woman Hater Arraigned by Women (1620);
- the second and third editions of John Fletcher's The Faithful Shepherdess, 1629 (printed by Thomas Cotes) and 1634 (printed by Augustine Matthews) respectively;
- the second quarto of Thomas Middleton's Michaelmas Term (1630);
- the second quarto of Middleton's The Phoenix (also 1630);
- the second quarto of Barten Holyday's Technogamia (also 1630);
- the first quarto of Shackerley Marmion's A Fine Companion (1633), printed by Augustine Matthews;
- the first quartos of Sir William Davenant's The Triumphs of the Prince D'Amour, The Wits, and The Platonick Lovers (all 1636).

Meighen published posthumous first editions of the three plays of Thomas Goffe — The Raging Turk (1631), The Courageous Turk (1632), and Orestes (1633). In 1628, he issued A Recantation of an Ill-Led Life, the memoir of the minor dramatist John Clavell. He also printed his share of the popular and ephemeral literature of his era, like Thomas Harper's The True History of the Tragic Loves of Hippolito and Isabella (1633).

His modern reputation as a publisher is mixed; critics do not rank him highly in terms of the quality of the texts he produced. In particular, the second Jonson folio has been condemned for its poor printing and organizational confusion.

== Post mortem ==
Early in 1641 Meighen entered into a partnership with three other stationers for the purpose of publishing law books; but he died before the planned partnership could produce any results. His widow, Mercy Meighen, received a court grant of the right to administer her late husband's estate on 21 March 1642 (new style). Mercy Meighen (died 1654) continued her late husband's business, entering a partnership with stationer Gabriell Bedell in November 1646.

Yet another Richard Meighen, a son of Richard and Mercy Meighen, continued in the publishing business; he issued Three Excellent Tragedies, a collected edition of Goffe's plays, in 1656.
