= Gerard Langbaine =

17th-century English biographer

Gerard Langbaine (15 July 1656 – 23 June 1692) was an English dramatic biographer and critic, best known for his An Account of the English Dramatic Poets (1691), the earliest work to give biographical and critical information on the playwrights of English Renaissance theatre. He is sometimes called Junior or the Younger to distinguish him from his father (1609–58) of the same name, a Doctor of Divinity who was Provost of The Queen's College, Oxford (1646–58) and Keeper of the University Archives.

== Life ==
The younger Langbaine was born in the parish of St. Peter-in-the-East, Oxford; his father's second son, he was apprenticed to a bookseller in St. Paul's Churchyard in London, but was sent to University after his older brother William died in 1672. He was educated at University College, Oxford, married, and settled in the neighborhood of Oxford. In 1690 he acquired a post at the University, as "yeoman bedel in arts," and in the following year was promoted to "esquire bedel of law and architypographus." (In his post as "architypographus" or printer, he issued an Appendix to the University Catalogue of Graduates.)

Langbaine's widow Mary remarried after his death to the University College fellow William Smith, contrary to the rules forbidding fellows to have wives.

== Works ==
Langbaine devoted his critical energies to the attempt to bring order and understanding to the stage drama of his era. He compiled A New Catalogue of English Plays (1688), in which he traced the sources of many plays of English Renaissance and Restoration drama, to the prose tales of Cinthio, Bandello, Belleforest and similar authors, and ultimately to classical sources. Langbaine has been called "the only serious scholar in this field for many years". By his own testimony (in A New Catalogue), Langbaine collected printed editions of 980 plays and masques, not counting drolls and interludes.

(Langbaine's Catalogue was first published in November 1687 under a false title, Momus Triumphans: or The Plagiaries of the English Stage, which mocked what others considered Langbaine's obsessive concern with plagiarism. In the correct edition that followed, Langbaine complained that "My friends may think me Lunatick." He blamed John Dryden for the trick, and became a determined enemy of the poet/dramatist.)

Langbaine work The Hunter. A discourse of horsemanship: directing the right way to breed, keep and train a horse, for ordinary hunting and plates was published in Oxford in 1685 for Nicholas Cox, bookseller. Copies of this 98 page discourse are found in the British Library and the Library of Congress.

Langbaine was active in the period when the first attempts were being made to clarify and comprehend the lush confusion of English drama in the sixteenth and seventeenth centuries. The first catalogues of plays had been printed by Richard Rogers and William Ley, in their edition of The Careless Shepherdess (1656), and by Edward Archer, in his edition of The Old Law (also 1656). Francis Kirkman issued two subsequent, more complete lists in 1661 and 1671. Langbaine was a friend and confidant of Kirkman; in fact, the strongest criticism mounted against Langbaine is that he accepted Kirkman's attributions with too much credulity.

Langbaine's Account of the English Dramatic Poets was extended in subsequent editions. Both the Account and the New Catalogue were included in the 1711 edition of the plays of the Beaumont and Fletcher canon, the first since the second Beaumont and Fletcher folio of 1679. As a result, the 1711 edition, printed in eight octavo volumes, is sometimes known as the Langbaine edition – although Langbaine did not edit any plays, of Beaumont and Fletcher or anyone else.
