= The Spanish Gypsy =

English Jacobean tragicomedy

The Spanish Gypsy is an English Jacobean tragicomedy, dating from around 1623. The play was likely a collaboration between several dramatists, including Thomas Middleton, William Rowley, Thomas Dekker, and John Ford. Like Shakespeare's lost play Cardenio, The Spanish Gypsy is an English reworking of the novellas of Miguel de Cervantes, combining two of Cervantes' Novelas Ejemplares into a single drama.

== Plot summary ==
Act 1. The noble Roderigo sees a beautiful young girl (Clara) walking one night with her family. Declaring himself bewitched by her beauty, he kidnaps her with the help of his friends, Diego and Lewys, then takes her back to his residence and rapes her. After the fact, Roderigo feels remorse and lets her go. Clara studies the room and manages to steal a crucifix before she is returned to town; these are her only clues as to the identity of her attacker. Later, Lewys realizes with horror that the girl he helped kidnap is the very woman he has been courting. He confronts Roderigo, who lies and tells him that he let the girl go without harming her.

Act 2. There is a group of gypsies in Madrid lodging in the house of Juana Cardochia. One of them is a gypsy girl of unusual beauty and intelligence, named Pretiosa. She is courted by the foolish Sancho (the ward of Don Pedro, Clara's father), as well as by the noble Don John. Despite the difference in their social stations, Don John asks Pretiosa to marry him. Pretiosa agrees only if Don John consents to live as a gypsy for two years. Meanwhile, Clara returns to her mother and father (Maria and don Pedro de Cortes) and relates her misfortune. Her family urges secrecy for the moment. Lewys arrives to court Clara, but she is reluctant. Lewys and Clara's father, don Pedro, discuss how Lewys’ father was killed by a nobleman named Alvarez some years earlier. Alvarez has been living in exile ever since, though no one knows his whereabouts. Don Fernando, the Corregidor (mayor) of Madrid as well as Roderigo's father, wants Lewys to pardon Alvarez and allow him to return to Madrid. Sancho returns home and is scolded by his guardian Don Pedro. Sancho and his servant, Soto, decide to run off and join the troupe of gypsies.

Act 3. Roderigo, now wracked with guilt for his crime, meets Sancho and Soto and decides to turn gypsy as well. The whole troupe goes to perform at the house of Francisco de Carcamo, don John's father. Meanwhile, Clara is injured near Don Fernando's house, and is brought inside his home to be cared for. Clara recognizes the room where she was raped, and asks don Fernando if he has any children. Fernando replies that he has two: his son Roderigo, and a daughter who was lost at sea shortly after her birth. Clara reveals her rape to Fernando, showing him the crucifix as proof. Fernando is horrified, and vows vengeance upon his son.

Act 4. Don John becomes a gypsy and is formally betrothed to Pretiosa; he is renamed Andrew. Andrew refuses the hostess Cardochia's advances, but at last consents to take a jewel she offers him. The gypsy troupe arrives at don Fernando's house and he asks them to act out a play he has written. Fernando pretends not to recognize his son Roderigo, and asks him to play the lead role: that of a son forced to marry an ugly heiress. The play begins, but is interrupted by a fight between Andrew and Diego (who is Cardochia's admirer). Seeking revenge, the spurned Cardochia has accused Andrew of stealing the jewel she gave him. Andrew is arrested and taken away. Don Fernando confronts his son Roderigo and tells him that the play is real: he must marry the ugly heiress. Roderigo refuses and expresses his desire to marry the beautiful woman who had been watching the play that evening. (The woman is Clara, though Roderigo seems not to recognize her from the rape.) Fernando agrees to the marriage.

Act 5. Roderigo has married Clara offstage. But Fernando then stages an elaborate interrogation, first telling his son that he has been punished by marriage to a wanton, then pressing him to confess his crimes. Roderigo eventually breaks down and admits to the rape, adding that he wishes he could have married the woman he wronged. Clara and her family then emerge from hiding and explain everything. Roderigo vows to love Clara and redeem himself. Seeking to bargain for Andrew's freedom, Alvarez reveals himself to Lewys. He laments his part in the death of Lewys’ father, and offers Lewys his life. Lewys finds he cannot kill the older man, and the two are reconciled. Soon afterwards, the gypsy girl Pretiosa arrives to beg Fernando for the release of her betrothed, Andrew. The mother of the gypsy troupe reveals to Fernando that Andrew is really Don John, son of Francisco de Carcamo. Furthermore, she reveals that the exiled Alvarez is the leader of the gypsy troupe, that she herself is Alvarez's wife and Fernando's own missing sister, and that Pretiosa is Fernando's long-lost daughter. Cardochia confesses her plot, and is promised to Diego as penance. Don John and Pretiosa are married.

== Performance and Historical Context ==
The Spanish Gypsy was licensed for performance by Sir Henry Herbert, the Master of the Revels, on 9 July 1623; the text includes two mentions of the camels and elephant that arrived in London for exhibit in that month. The play was performed at Court on 5 November that year; Prince Charles attended.

== Sources in Cervantes ==
The Spanish Gypsy draws two of its main storylines from Cervantes' Novelas Ejemplares. From "La Gitanilla" it borrows the idea of a young gypsy girl who is actually of noble birth, and of the nobleman who falls in love with her and becomes a gypsy himself as a result. From "La fuerza de la sangre" it takes the idea of a nobleman who rapes a well-born girl; the girl eventually discovers the identity of her attacker, and he is made to repent and make amends by marrying her. Many of the characters' names are either kept the same as in Cervantes' novellas or simply anglicized: names such as Preciosa, Carducha, and Andres become Pretiosa, Cardochia, and Andrew, for example.

== Problems of Authorship ==
The London stationer (i.e. bookseller and publisher) Richard Marriot published the play in quarto in 1653 as a collaboration between Thomas Middleton and William Rowley, one of several the two dramatists appear to have shared. A second quarto was issued in 1661. The assignment of authorship was unquestioned till the 20th century. H. Dugdale Sykes was the first modern scholar to dispute the attribution to Middleton and Rowley; he favoured John Ford as the author, judging on a range of stylistic and textual features.

Following up on Sykes' perception, M. Joan Sergeaunt noted the strong resemblances between the gypsy scenes in this play and similar materials in the works of Thomas Dekker. Later scholars, perhaps most prominently David Lake, have refined and confirmed these studies. The similarity of the comic subplot of the play to the work of Rowley has also been noticed. The clown characters Sancho and Soto in The Spanish Gypsy show clear resemblances with Rowleian clowns, like Chough and Trimtram in A Fair Quarrel; Soto is even called Lollio in IV.iii.80–86, Lollio being the name of Rowley's clown character in The Changeling. The Spanish Gypsy dates from the early 1620s, a time when Dekker, Ford, and Rowley were certainly working together: they wrote The Witch of Edmonton in 1621, and joined with John Webster for Keep the Widow Waking in 1624.

As Gary Taylor has recently argued, however, "If the plot/scenario for the play was written primarily by one author, Middleton is the likeliest candidate."
