= The Wits =

Stage play by Sir William Davenant

The Wits is a Caroline era stage play, a comedy by Sir William Davenant. It was licensed for performance by Sir Henry Herbert, the Master of the Revels, on 19 January 1634; it was staged by the King's Men at the Blackfriars Theatre. It was first published in quarto by Richard Meighen in 1636. A number of critics have considered it "Davenant's most successful and influential comedy."

Herbert was initially unhappy with The Wits, particularly on account of its oaths and explicit language; the influential courtier Endymion Porter interceded with King Charles I to tolerate and allow the play, which then proved popular at Court. Davenant would eventually become an effective courtier himself; the 1636 edition contains Davenant's dedication of the play to Porter, and a commendatory poem by Thomas Carew.

The Wits has been seen as anticipating aspects of Restoration comedy, especially in its "strong, unsentimental, witty heroine" — "Lady Ample represents the Restoration ideal of a woman being the equal to a man in all respects."

When Davenant became manager of the newly organized Duke's Company at the beginning of the Restoration era, one of the first plays he produced was The Wits (1661), with Thomas Betterton in the lead role and Hester Davenport as Lady Ample. The Wits was republished in 1665, in an octavo volume that also included The Platonick Lovers. In a revised form, The Wits was included in the edition of Davenant's collected works issued by Henry Herringman in 1673.

== Sources ==
In plotting The Wits, Davenant depended upon a play of the previous generation, Middleton and Rowley's Wit at Several Weapons. The common story involved two male relatives, an older and a younger. The older fancies himself a "wit;" he controls the family fortune through the rules of primogeniture, and denies his younger relative any funds. The younger man, impoverished but truly clever, manipulates and cheats the other, until the older man has to concede that the younger has triumphed in a contest of wit, and allows him an income.

Davenant's two brothers, the Elder Pallatine and the Younger Pallatine, are versions of Sir Perfidious Oldcraft and Wittypate Oldcraft in the Middleton/Rowley play. Both comedies also feature an old guardian who tries to arrange an undesirable marriage for the pretty young woman who is his ward; the old guardian must be fooled and outmaneuvered by the play's youngsters for a happy ending.

== Synopsis ==
The opening scene introduces the Younger Pallatine and his henchmen, Pert and Meager, two discharged soldiers. The overall plot is quickly delineated. To finance his planned con-games, Pallatine has to borrow money from Lucy, the girl he loves; she has traded in her small supply of jewellery for funds for Pallatine.

The second scene shifts to the Elder Pallatine and his confederate Sir Morglay Thwack. Both are wealthy landowners from the north of England, who have developed an absurd plan; outfitting themselves in flashy clothes, they have come to London to live by their wits. They intend to pursue liaisons with women, and moreover to depend on those prospective lovers for income, like gigolos. They even have a division of labour: the Elder Pallatine will pursue the younger women, while the grey-haired Sir Morglay will concentrate on the widows. The Younger Pallatine reproves them over their intentions, but the two are deaf to him. And since the Elder Pallatine intends to live by his wits, he thinks his younger brother should do so too, telling him, "Never hereafter...Will I disburse for you again; never."

Act II brings on the third group of characters, Lady Ample and her servants Engine and Ginet. The Lady is a young heiress who has been under the guardianship of Sir Tyrant Thrift — a guardianship that is scheduled to end the next day. Sir Tyrant has gone to find a husband for Lady Ample, to further his control over her; but the Lady has plans of her own. As his name indicates, Sir Tyrant is a skinflint who has allowed his ward and her servants meager upkeep; Lady Ample has surmounted this by allowing herself to be courted by rich men, and using their expensive presents of gems and other fine things to improve her standard of living. The Lady's cousin Lucy bursts in with distressing news. Lucy's aunt has learned of the money she gave to young Pallatine; assuming (incorrectly) that Lucy has surrendered her virginity to her lover, the aunt has tossed the girl out of her house. Ample is also offended at Lucy's conduct — but over the fact that Lucy has given money to a man, instead of the other way around.

Given the would-be gigolos' plans, it is not surprising that the Elder Pallatine and Sir Morglay find their way to Lady Ample. Their attempts at courtship are offensively inept. The play's two sides are now drawn: Lady Ample and her followers, and young Pallatine and his, are united in the goal of humiliating the two self-styled wits and cheating them of their money.

With the help of a complaisant constable and his night watch, the conspirators launch a series of tricks that victimise first the Elder Pallatine, then Sir Morglay, and finally Sir Tyrant Thrift; each man falls victim to his greed and folly. The Elder Pallatine is locked in a trunk for hours; Sir Morglay buys his freedom with his last hundred pounds; Sir Tyrant thinks he is arrested for sacrilege and robbing a church. In the end, the conspirators are rewarded with ample funds; the Elder Pallatine graciously concedes that his younger brother is his superior in wit, and endows him with one of his country estates. The Younger Pallatine and Lucy can now marry; and Lady Ample agrees to take the Elder Pallatine as her husband, as long as he acknowledges her superiority in cleverness.
