= A Chaste Maid in Cheapside =

Play by Thomas Middleton, written c. 1613

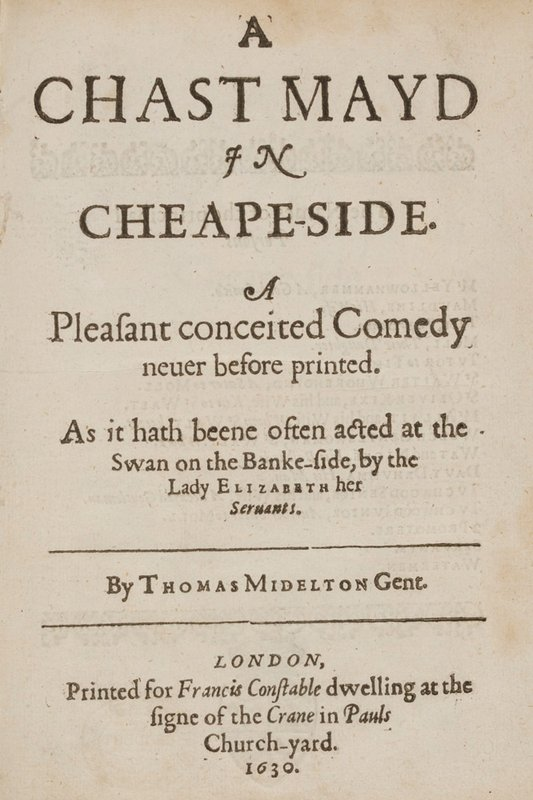
Title page of A Chaste Maid in Cheapside

A Chaste Maid in Cheapside is a city comedy written c. 1613 by the English Jacobean playwright Thomas Middleton. Unpublished until 1630, and long-neglected afterwards, it is now considered among the best and most characteristic Jacobean comedies.

The play was originally staged by the Lady Elizabeth's Men. The 1630 quarto was published by the bookseller Francis Constable.

== Plot ==
The play presents multiple plots centred on the marriage of Moll Yellowhammer, the titular maid, who is daughter to a wealthy Cheapside goldsmith, and, in particular, her intended husband, Sir Walter Whorehound. Moll loves Touchwood Junior, a poor gallant; her father, however, has betrothed her to Whorehound, a philandering knight eager for Moll's dowry. As a kind of side-bargain, Sir Walter has promised Moll's brother Tim a "landed niece" from Wales. Tim, a fatuous scholar, returns to London from Cambridge University with his Latin tutor. This "landed niece" is in reality one of Sir Walter's mistresses, who has no land in actuality. Sir Walter is also having an affair with the wife of Allwit, a knowing cuckold, his name an inversion of "wittol," who lives happily on the money Sir Walter gives his wife.

Meanwhile, Touchwood Senior (the elder brother of Moll's true love) prepares to depart from his wife; prodigiously fertile, he impregnates any woman he sleeps with. He and his wife must separate to avoid another pregnancy, which they cannot afford. His salvation comes from the Kixes, an aging couple who have not been able to conceive. This is important because if they have a child, Sir Walter (a relation of theirs) will not inherit their fortune, on which he has confidently depended, going so far as to live beyond his means. A maid tells the Kixes that Touchwood makes a special fertility potion; Touchwood deceives his way into the bed of Lady Kix.

After an abortive attempt to elope with Touchwood Junior, Moll is guarded at home. The day before the wedding, Moll flees her parents' home again. Caught while attempting to cross the Thames, she is drenched and seems to fall ill upon being brought home. Touchwood Junior and Sir Walter fight in the street, and both are wounded.

Sir Walter believes that he is near death. At Allwit's house, he repents all of his sins, condemning the Allwits for indulging him. When news is brought that Lady Kix is pregnant (thus ruining Sir Walter's prospects), the Allwits eject him and plan to sell all Sir Walter's gifts and move to a home in The Strand.

Moll remains very ill; when Touchwood Senior brings word that his brother has died, she faints and appears to die while Susan, her servant, is let in on a secret plan. Saddened, the Yellowhammers agree to Touchwood Senior's request that the young lovers receive a joint burial. At the funeral, Moll and Touchwood Junior rise from their coffins and the mourning turns to celebration. The two are wed, as Tim and the Welsh "niece" had been earlier that day; Kix promises to support the family of Touchwood Senior, who announces that Sir Walter has been imprisoned for debt. All exit, headed for a celebratory dinner.

== Stage history ==
The play's title page states that it was acted at the Swan Theatre by Lady Elizabeth's Men. There is no evidence that the play was revived during the Restoration period, or that it was staged in any form between then and the twentieth century. A very limited excerpt from the play, titled A Posy for the Ring for the occasion, was acted at Earls Court on 16 September 1912. Productions of the full play were presented at Harvard University and at Leeds University in 1956; multiple other stagings have occurred from the early 1960s on, and the play is now Middleton's third most staged play, after The Changeling and Women Beware Women.
