= The Courageous Turk =

The Courageous Turk, or Amurath I is a play by the Jacobean dramatist Thomas Goffe, first performed in 1618 and published posthumously in 1632. The plot is based primarily on passages from The generall historie of the Turkes by Richard Knolles. The play purports to be an account of the life of the Ottoman Emperor Murad I, called "Amurath," but it also incorporates elements from Knolles's description of the life of Mehmed II.

== Plot ==
In the play, Amurath falls in love with a Greek captive, Eumorphe. His tutor Lala Schahin convinces Amurath to kill her and return to military conquests. The play concludes with the first Battle of Kosovo (1389), in which Amurath is victorious but is killed by the Serbian hero Cobelitz. His older son Baiazet succeeds him but is forced to kill his younger brother to avoid competition for the throne.
