= Women Beware Women =

1657 play written by Thomas Middleton

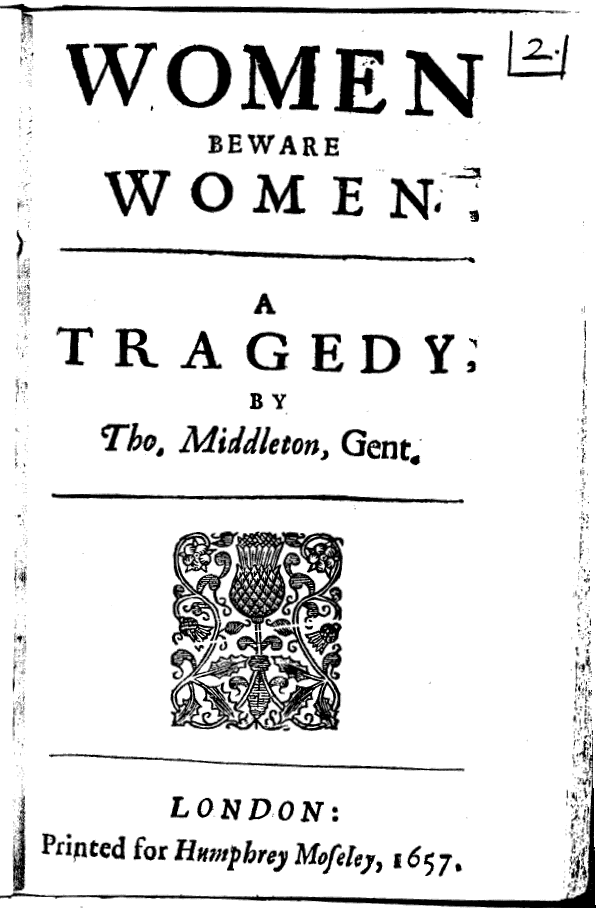
- Title page of the first published edition (1657)
- Original language: English
- Written by: Thomas Middleton
- Subject: Lust
- Genre: Tragedy
- Setting: Florence

Premiere
- Date: Unknown
- Place: Unknown

Women Beware Women is a Jacobean tragedy written by Thomas Middleton, and first published in 1657.

== Date ==
The date of authorship of the play is deeply uncertain. Scholars have estimated its origin anywhere from 1612 to 1627; 1623–24 has been plausibly suggested. The play was entered into the Stationers' Register on 9 September 1653 by the bookseller Humphrey Moseley, along with two other Middleton plays, More Dissemblers Besides Women and No Wit, No Help Like a Woman's. In 1657 Moseley published Women Beware Women together with More Dissemblers in an octavo volume titled Two New Plays. Both the Register entry and the first edition's title page assign Women Beware Women to Middleton—an attribution which has never been seriously questioned and which is accepted by the scholarly consensus. No performances of the play in its own era are known. The octavo text of the play is prefaced by a commendatory poem by Nathaniel Richards, author of The Tragedy of Messalina (published 1640).

Thomas Dekker's play Match Me in London (written c. 1612, but printed in 1631) has a plot that is strongly similar to Women Beware, though with a happy ending rather than a tragic conclusion.

== Plot synopsis ==
Women Beware Women tells the story of Bianca, a woman who escapes from her rich home to elope with the poor Leantio. Fearful and insecure, Leantio requires that his mother lock Bianca up while he is away. While she is locked up, the Duke of Florence spots Bianca in a window and attempts to woo her with the help of Livia, a widow. He ultimately rapes Bianca. Bianca becomes deeply cynical, falls out of love with Leantio because of his poverty, and becomes the mistress of the Duke. Hippolito (Livia's brother) is tormented because he is in love with his niece Isabella, who is due to marry the Ward (a foolish and immature heir). Livia tells the younger woman that she is illegitimate (and therefore not related by blood to Hippolito), and Isabella and Hippolito then start an affair.

Busy putting together illegitimate relationships, Livia discovers that she is also able to love again and as a result, she becomes Leantio's mistress. However, as affairs and relationships are exposed, one of the bloodiest Jacobean tragedies is created.

Hippolito learns of his sister's affair with Leantio, and kills Leantio. The grieving Livia reveals to Isabella that she had lied earlier: Isabella is related by blood to Hippolito. A masque is held to celebrate the Duke's impending marriage to the widowed Bianca, but it descends into bloodshed. Hippolito is killed by poisoned arrows (shot by cupids in the masque) and dies after throwing himself on his sword; and Isabella and Livia murder each other. Bianca tries to murder the Duke's brother, but accidentally poisons the Duke himself. After realising her mistake, she finishes the poisoned drink and dies.

== Characters ==
- Bianca – Leantio's wife
- Leantio – Bianca's husband
- Mother – widow, Leantio's mother
- Duke of Florence – Bianca's lover
- Lord Cardinal – brother to the Duke of Florence
- Fabritio – Isabella's father, who is eager to marry off his daughter
- Isabella – daughter to Fabritio, lover to her uncle Hippolito
- Livia – widow, sister to Fabritio and Hippolito, aunt to Isabella
- Hippolito – brother to Fabritio and Livia, lover to his niece Isabella
- The Ward – rich young heir, prospect for Isabella
- Guardiano – uncle to the Ward
- Sordido – the Ward's Man

== Sources ==
Middleton based the plot of his play on actual events. Bianca Cappello was first the mistress and then the second wife and Duchess of Francesco I de' Medici, Grand Duke of Tuscany. The story of Bianca's elopement with her first husband, her affair with the Duke, her first husband's death and her marriage to the Duke, is adapted by Middleton for his play. The subplot of Hippolito and Isabella in Middleton's play is strongly similar to the plot of a French novel that was published in 1597 but not translated into English until 1627, the year of Middleton's death. Scholars are divided as to whether Middleton was familiar with the novel in manuscript form prior to its 1627 printing, or whether the translator of the book was influenced by Middleton's play.

== Chess ==
The device of the chess game exploited by Middleton in Women Beware Women has an obvious commonality with his own A Game at Chess—but the same chess-game device also appears in John Fletcher's play The Spanish Curate, which was acted in 1622. Here again, scholars are divided as to which play preceded and influenced which. It is also possible that both writers independently derived the chess device from the same source. T. S. Eliot, a student of Jacobean drama, refers to the Women Beware Women chess game in The Waste Land, Part II, line 137.

== Reception ==
Little is known of the play's performances and reception in Middleton's time; Nathaniel Richards, who wrote a preface to the 1653 edition, stated that he had seen it, but no other records of performance survive. According to the Database of Early English Playbooks, the King's Men was the first company to put on the production.

For modern critics, Women Beware Women has regularly been paired with The Changeling as constituting Middleton's two noteworthy late achievements in the genre of tragedy—though Women Beware Women has usually been judged the lesser of the two works. The bloody masque that concludes the play has been called a "ridiculous holocaust". With growing critical attention over the years, however, the estimation of Women Beware Women has intensified; the play is now judged to be among Middleton's greatest works. "Women Beware Women displays Middleton's maturest understanding of the relation of power to desire, and of political culture to civil society."

== Revivals ==
The play was never revived in the eighteenth or nineteenth centuries, but productions became relatively common after the 1950s. The most recent major production was at the Olivier stage of the Royal National Theatre, London; it was directed by Marianne Elliott and starred Harriet Walter as Livia and Vanessa Kirby as Isabella. This production was met with very favourable reviews.

== Adaptations ==
The play was adapted for television for an episode of Granada Television's Play of the Week in 1965. The production was directed by Gordon Flemyng and starred Gene Anderson as Livia, Godfrey Quigley as Guardino, Michael Barrington as Fabricio, Karin Fernald as Isabella, Laurence Payne as Hippolito, Diana Rigg as Bianca, and William Gaunt as Leantio.

A modern adaptation by Howard Barker at the Royal Court Theatre in 1986, in which the first two-thirds of Middleton's play were preserved but the ending was entirely revamped; among other changes, Sordido rapes Bianca before her wedding. Barker stated that he was rejecting Middleton's Jacobean Puritanism, writing in his programme note that "Middleton says lust leads to the grave. I say desire alters perception ... Middleton knew the body was the source of politics. He did not know it was also the source of hope."

A radio adaptation was broadcast on 30 March 2003 on BBC Radio 3 starring Beth Chalmers as Bianca, John McAndrew as Leantio, Bill Wallis as Guardiano and Sara McGayghe as Isabella.

A musical adaptation was workshopped with student on the University of Chichester Musical Theatre Triple Threat course in May 2017 as a part of the university's annual Microfest Project, with direction-adaptation by Emma Kilbey, musical direction/arrangements by Matt Mellor, and choreography by Wendy White.

A new adaptation was performed at the Sam Wanamaker Theatre in London from February to April 2020.
