= Nathanael Richards =

17th century English dramatist and poet

Nathanael Richards (fl. 1630–1654) was an English dramatist and poet, perhaps from Kent. He should not be confused with Nathaniel Richards (1611–1660), a cleric.

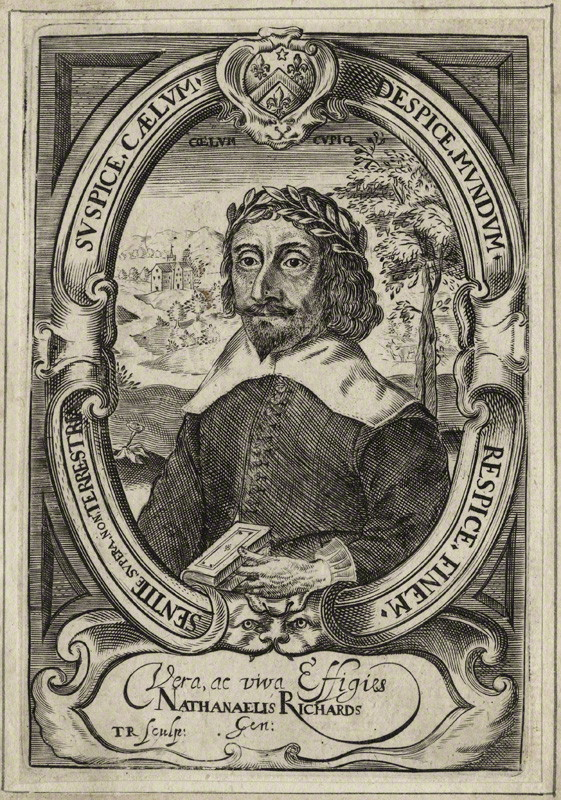
Nathanael Richards, 1640 engraving

== Background and possible connections to the Hammond family ==
A possible relative, Gabriel Richards, is mentioned in William Hammond's letters as a "cousin". Some unresolved issues remain about the putative family connection.

- John Richards gave the manor of Rowling, a hamlet near Goodnestone, Dover, to William Hammond of St Alban's Court, on his death in 1661. The Richards family descended from John Richards, gent., who acquired the manor, with coat of arms sable, a chevron, between three fleurs de lis, argent. Goodnestone adjoins the parish of Nonington, where the Hammond seat of St Alban's Court is located.
- Gabriel Richards of Rowling left on his death in 1672 (reportedly at age 77) property to William Hammond the younger.

George Charles Moore Smith concluded in 1909 that Nathanael Richards the dramatist had up to that point been misidentified, and was a Richards of Rowling, rather than from a Devon family. He pointed out the match of his coat of arms, as shown in the portrait engraving of 1640.

- Tentatively, Moore Smith made Nathanael Richards the younger brother of Gabriel Richards, respectively the third and second sons of the Captain William Richards with a monument in Brabourne church. Gabriel Richards put up that monument, in 1672.
- On the other hand, monumental inscriptions in Holy Cross Church, Goodnestone, taken down in the 18th century by Bryan Faussett, make Gabriel Richards (c.1595–1672) the son of John Richards and his wife Alice Austen. He married Elisabeth Smith; there was one son, Richard who died in 1661, and one daughter Elizabeth (1649–1670) who married Robert Brodnax.
- Burke's General Armory for "Richards of Rowley" makes William Richards the Vice-Admiral a son of John Richards (died 1609); and so a possible brother of Gabriel Richards.

Nathanael Richards wrote an acrostic poem, published in 1630, for Sir Thomas Stanley of Cumberlow on his marriage to Mary Hammond, relative of William Hammond. There was also a poem for Lady Mary, when with child.

Richards was a friend of Thomas Middleton, leading to the suggestion that the William Hammond to whom Middleton gave the manuscript of A Game at Chess in 1625 may have been of St Alban's Court (from the point of view of date, this would be the grandfather of William Hammond who died in 1685).

== Works ==
Richards issued in 1630 The Celestiall Publican, a religious poem. At the end are epitaphs on James I, Sir Francis Carew, and others, with an anagram on Sir Julius Cæsar and verses on the author's friend, Sir Henry Hart, K.B. These poems were reprinted, with some additions, in 1641, as Poems Sacred and Satyricall, London, for H. Blunden, 1641.

Richards's major work was the tragedy Messallina (1640), a historical play based on Tacitus, Suetonius, Pliny the younger, and the sixth satire of Juvenal. There are anachronisms, such as firearms, and a hundred vestal virgins are gratuitously introduced. The work is dedicated to John Cary, Viscount Rochford, and there are complimentary verses by Robert Davenport, Thomas Jordan, Thomas Rawlins, and others. It is one of the few plays of the period that have a cast list: it includes William Cartwright senior (Claudius), John Robinson (Saufellus), Christopher Goad (Silius), John Barret (Messalina), and Thomas Jordan (Lepida).

Some verses by Richards were prefixed to Thomas Middleton's Women Beware Women.

== Notes ==
Attribution

This article incorporates text from a publication now in the public domain: Lee, Sidney, ed. (1896). "Richards, Nathaniel". Dictionary of National Biography. Vol. 48. London: Smith, Elder & Co.
