= The Triumphs of Truth =

Medieval pageant by Thomas Middleton

The Triumphs of Truth was a medieval pageant to honor a British Lord mayor and written circa 1613 by English Renaissance playwright Thomas Middleton. The pageant was credited with first creating the term white people to refer to Europeans.

== See also ==
- White people
