= A Fair Quarrel =

Jacobean tragicomedy by Thomas Middleton and William Rowley

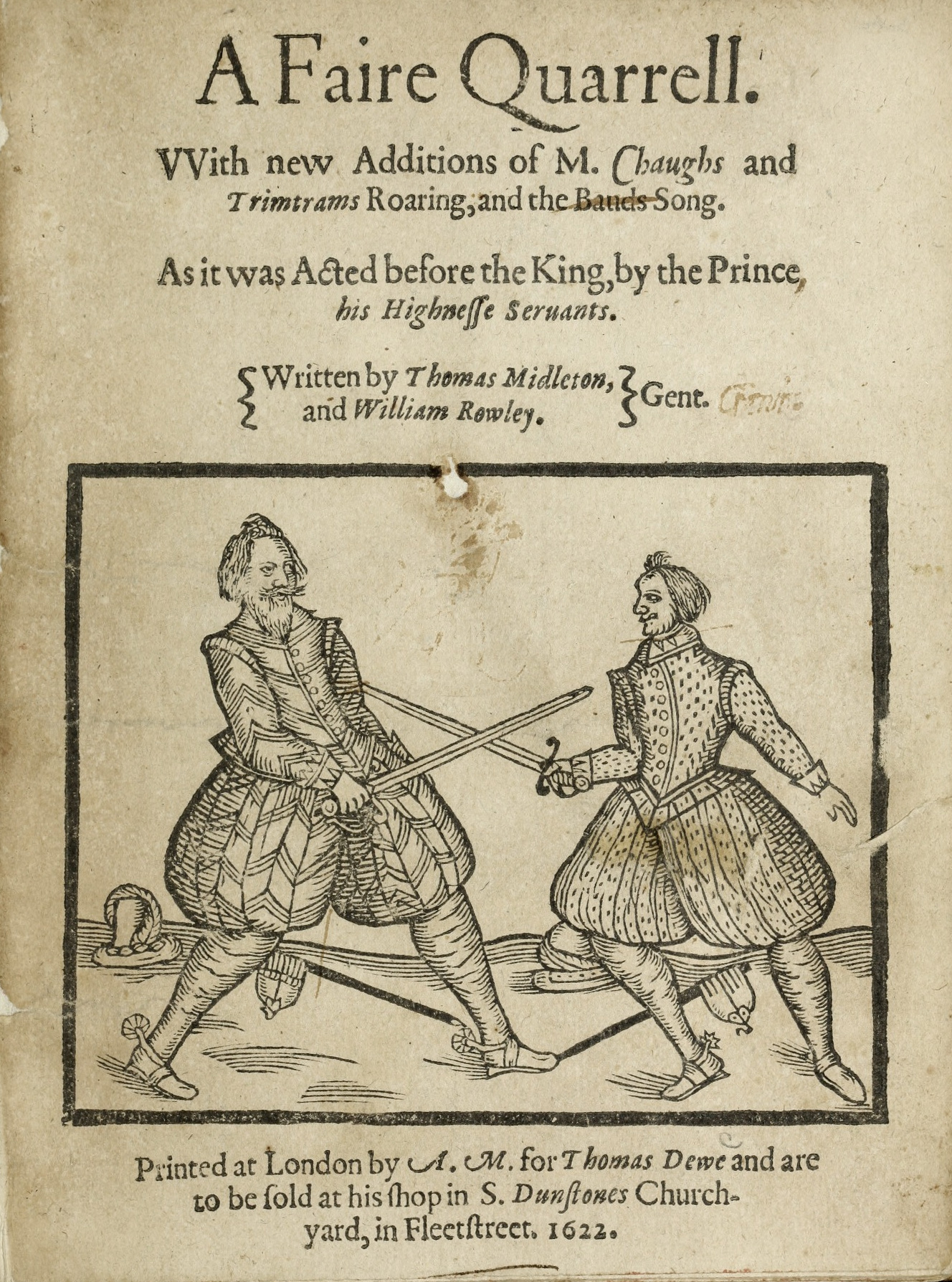
Title page of the second edition of A Fair Quarrel (1622).

A Fair Quarrel is a Jacobean tragicomedy, a collaboration between Thomas Middleton and William Rowley that was first published in 1617.

== Performance and Publication ==
The play was written sometime between 1612 and 1617, and probably after October 1614, on the basis of suspected borrowings from Ben Jonson's Bartholomew Fair. The first quarto was printed by George Eld for the booksellers John Trundle and Edward Wright, and was published in two states or impressions: Q1a is missing the "roaring school" scene (Act IV, scene iv), while Q1b includes the scene as an appendix. The second quarto, issued in 1622 and printed by Augustine Matthews for Thomas Dewe, places the "roaring school" scene in its proper place. The play was dedicated to Robert Grey, Esq., the dedication signed by Rowley.

The play was originally performed by Prince Charles's Men, the company to which Rowley belonged at the time, and the title page of both quartos states that it was "acted before the King". After the deaths of both authors, the play became the property of Queen Henrietta's Men. By 1639 it was in the repertory of Beeston's Boys, and it was revived at least once during the Restoration era, in 1662.

== Authorship ==
The play was attributed to Middleton and Rowley on the title page of Q1 in 1617; internal evidence confirms the correctness of the attribution. The usual collaborative practice of Middleton and Rowley is for Middleton to take primary responsibility for the serious main plot and for Rowley, a comic actor by profession, to handle the comic subplot – which normally means that Middleton's share is more extensive than Rowley's. The rule is not rigidly applied, however; in The Changeling, Rowley composed the play's opening and closing scenes as well as the subplot, so that the shares of the two writers are roughly equal. In A Fair Quarrel, Middleton as usual handles the main plot, and subplot materials are the work of Rowley. But A Fair Quarrel is structured on three levels: the main plot tells the story of Captain Ager and his mother, the second-level plot relates the story of Fitzallen and Jane, and the third is the overt comedy material about the clowns Chough and Trimtram. As a result of this structure and division of labour, Rowley is the author of roughly two-thirds of the play, and Middleton only one third. David Lake divides their respective shares this way.

Middleton – Act I, scene i (first 90 lines); Act II, scene i; Act III, scenes i and iii;
Act IV, scenes ii and iii; Act V, scene i (last 52 lines);
Rowley – Act I, scene I (last 341 lines); Act II, scene ii; Act III, scene ii;
Act IV, scenes i and iv; Act V, scene i (first 395 lines).

This division is generally accepted by the scholarly consensus, with some occasional and minor dissent; Edward Engelberg assigned part of Act III, scene ii to Middleton instead of Rowley.

Rowley had a habit of writing "fat clown" roles for himself to play; Chough, the primary clown in A Fair Quarrel, is a wrestler, and may have been another role Rowley wrote for himself to play.

The subject of duelling was highly topical in the period the play originated; duels were becoming much more common in England, and King James's first proclamation against duelling was issued in October 1613.

== Sources ==
The most immediate source for the main plot of A Fair Quarrel is the subplot of Thomas Heywood's 1603 play A Woman Killed with Kindness – while Heywood's version itself derives from earlier sources, specific plot elements and verbal parallels link the Middleton and Heywood treatments of the material. The source for the Fitzallen subplot in A Fair Quarrel is one of the stories in the Hecatommithi of Cinthio. Rowley and Middleton derived the details of surgical practice in IV,ii and V,i of their play from a guide to "chirurgery" published in 1612, a fact that limits the earliest possible date of the play. Links and commonalities with a range of other contemporary dramas, including Middleton's collaboration with John Fletcher, The Nice Valour, place A Fair Quarrel in a larger context of literary and theatrical interrelationships.

== Synopsis ==
The long opening scene, which fills all of Act I, introduces the linked first and second level plots. The scene begins with a soliloquy by a wealthy citizen named Russell, who is concerned about the marriage of his only child, his daughter Jane. Jane has been courted by a young man named Fitzallen; the couple want to marry, but Russell is unhappy about his prospective son-in-law's lack of fortune – and he has developed a scheme to thwart the marriage. Russell's soliloquy ends with the arrival of his sister, the widowed Lady Ager; Russell informs her that the troop of soldiers in which her son serves has returned to England, much to her delight. Russell has a double connection to the soldiers: Captain Ager is his nephew, and the troop's Colonel is a kinsman to Fitzallen. When the Colonel and Captain visit with their friends, a quarrel quickly develops among the officers as to the relative merits of the Colonel and the Captain. Russell breaks up the first brawl between subordinates, but another soon erupts between the Colonel and Captain, on the question of comparative worth: the Captain's friends judge the two men of equal worth, though to the hot-headed Colonel, wrapped in the pride of his superior rank, this is insupportable. Russell intervenes again, and prevails on the soldiers to turn their swords over to him; the Colonel, wary of spoiling Fitzallen's marital prospects, agrees, as does the more level-headed Captain Ager.

Disarming the soldiers is an essential step in Russell's plan for frustrating Fitzallen and Jane's marriage: two sergeants enter to arrest Fitzallen for £1000 in unpaid debts, owed to "three creditors, Master Leech, Master Swallow, and Master Bonesuck." Fitzallen protests that he owes no such debts, and it becomes clear that Russell has staged a false arrest to clear the way for a wealthy suitor of his own choosing. The Colonel and the soldiers are outraged, but without their swords they cannot resist the armed sergeants. Fitzallen is taken to prison. The hot-headed Colonel vents his anger at Russell and his relations – and in the process he gives Captain Ager the ultimate insult, calling him a "son of a whore." The die is cast: the two men will meet on the field of honour.

Act II begins with Captain Ager solus, brooding on the insult to his mother. He believes his mother is honourable – but the belief is not quite as strong as it should be. When his mother enters, Ager gives her an oblique and misleading account of the insult; when he mentions the offending phrase, Lady Ager is outraged and slaps his face. Her reaction emboldens her son, and he explains the true circumstances of the matter. But when it becomes clear to Lady Ager that her son will fight a duel with the Colonel, she confesses a mysterious past indiscretion. Her horrified son now finds that his sense of honour will not allow him to go through with the duel, since the Colonel's insult is true.

Jane is shown consulting her Physician. The scene confirms what the opening scene had hinted: that Jane and Fitzallen have entered into a nuptial precontract, and that Jane is about to deliver Fitzallen's baby. (This arrangement, a legally-binding engagement, a "handfast" or "de praesenti betrothal," meant that the two lovers could engage in sexual contact and that their child would be legitimate – at least in some interpretations. Yet the woman in such a contract could be in an ambiguous position, especially if the full marriage ceremony did not ensue.) Jane, too shy to confess her situation to the Physician, speaks instead to his sister Anne; the two women become allies as a result. Her father enters, and introduces the rich prospective husband he has picked out for Jane: it is Chough, a crude and offensive fool.

Act III: Ager and his seconds show up to the planned duel, as do the Colonel and his. Ager makes it clear that he will not fight, much to the disgust of the others. The Colonel cannot let the matter go without denouncing Ager as a "coward" – and at this real offence to his honour, Ager resumes the duel. The Colonel falls, seriously wounded.

In the next scene, Jane has given birth to a healthy baby, and the child is put out to nurse. The Physician, thinking that Jane is what used to be called a "fallen woman," makes sexual advances at her, which Jane spurns. The mortified doctor threatens to expose the shame of what he thinks is her illegitimate child. The Physician's sister Anne, however, sympathises with Jane's plight.

Lady Ager is almost hysterical when she learns that her son has gone to meet the Colonel on the field of honour; and she reveals that her previous confession of sexual immorality was false, designed only to keep her son out of the duel.

Act IV is dominated by two comedy scenes. In the first (IV,i), Chough and his servant Trimtram are shown taking "roaring" lessons from a soldier turned con-artist, so that they can learn to be fashionable "roaring boys." In the second (IV,iv), Chough and Trimtram have set up their own roaring school, and indulge in a wild verbal fantasia of roaring talk. In between, the wounded Colonel is shown lying on what he thinks will be his deathbed; he makes his will and has it read aloud to his Sister – who learns that she will inherit all of the Colonel's property, but only if she marries Captain Ager. This is the way the Colonel plans to show his repentance and to make amends for the wrong he now sees he has done. Ager, for his part, learns from his mother that her earlier confession was a lie – and meets the Colonel's Sister and learns of his will.

In the play's conclusion, Jane is facing a marriage with the ridiculous Chough; the Physician, angry at her rejection of him, confronts Russell and Chough with his accusation. Chough immediately backs out of the ceremony, and Russell becomes reconciled to Fitzallen as a son-in-law, as better than any alternative. The Colonel has learned that he will recover from his wound; he and Captain Ager patch up their quarrel, and Ager accepts the Colonel's Sister as his bride.
