= Keep the Widow Waking =

Lost Jacobean play

Keep the Widow Waking is a lost Jacobean play, significant chiefly for the light it throws on the complexities of collaborative authorship in English Renaissance drama.

A Late Murder of the Son Upon the Mother, or Keep the Widow Waking was a tragedy licensed by the Master of the Revels (the Court official in charge of regulating drama) in September 1624, as the work of John Ford and John Webster ("Written by Forde, and Webster," the record states). Such an entry in the Revels accounts is generally accepted by scholars as strong evidence of authorship. In the case of this play, however, documents relating to a lawsuit are preserved in the Public Records Office in London—documents that include testimony by Thomas Dekker that Keep the Widow Waking was actually written by Dekker, Ford, Webster, and William Rowley.

This cluster of dramatists was known to have been working together in the early 1620s. Webster and Rowley would write A Cure for a Cuckold a year later (1625); and The Spanish Gypsy (1623) was perhaps written by Dekker, Ford, and Rowley. The Witch of Edmonton dates from 1621; the first published text of that play (1658) states that it was written by Dekker, Ford, Rowley, "&c." Scholars have generally ignored the "et cetera" and treated the play as the work of Ford, Dekker, and Rowley; yet the example of Keep the Widow Waking suggests that the "&c." should perhaps not be dismissed lightly.

It has been suggested that Wit Without Money, written by John Fletcher, is an antecedent of this play and may have influenced it.
