= The Phoenix (play) =

Play by Thomas Middleton

The Phoenix is a Jacobean play, a city comedy written by Thomas Middleton c. 1603–4, and performed by the Children of Paul's. It may be Middleton's earliest surviving play.

The play was performed at Court before King James on 20 February 1604. It was entered into the Stationers' Register on 9 May 1607; the first quarto was published later that year by the bookseller Arthur Johnson. A second quarto was issued in 1630 by Richard Meighen.

== Characters ==
- The Duke of Ferrara
- Infesto, a lord
- Lussurioso, a lord
- Proditor, a lord
- Nobles
- Prince Phoenix, the Duke's son
- Fidelio, his servant
- Niece to Falso
- Three Soldiers of the sea
- The Captain, Castiza's husband
- Castiza, Fidelio's mother
- The Groom of an inn
- Suitors to Tangle
- Tangle, a lawyer
- The Jeweller'S Wife, Falso's daughter
- Her Boy
- The Knight
- His Lackey
- Suitors to Falso
- Falso, a justice
- Latronello, his servant
- Furtivo, his servant
- Two Gentlemen, friends of Falso's brother
- Servant to Proditor
- Fucato, Falso's servant
- Constable and Officers
- Quieto, a reformed lawyer
- Quieto's Boy
- Maid to the Jeweller's Wife
- Gentleman, a reveller
- A Drawer

== Synopsis ==
=== Act I ===
Scene 1: A chamber in the palace of the Duke of Ferrara

The Duke of Ferrara is old and nearing death, and needs his son, the Phoenix, to take over from him. The boy is virtuous and wise; however, he has little practical experience of the world, and so his counsellors advise the Duke to send his son travelling. One of the lords, Proditor, says in asides that he hopes the Phoenix will go and never come back. The Phoenix enters, with his servant Fidelio; his father advises him to see the world, to find out what men are really like. He agrees to go in disguise, so that he will not be flattered in the way that princes always are. In private with Fidelio, he decides not to go abroad at all, but to stay in his own kingdom, to see what men are like at home and mark all their abuses. A young girl enters—she is the niece of Justice Falso and true love of Fidelio. She bids him goodbye; he instructs her to watch his mother, who has newly remarried a captain, without his own knowledge or consent, and he wants to know if she is being treated well.

Scene 2: A room in the Captain's house

The Captain at home. He very much regrets his marriage, since he hates the thought of being tied down, especially as his new wife isn't rich. She enters and he verbally abuses her, telling her to be more respectful to him, and asking why she married him. She laments. Proditor enters and seems to take a fancy to the wife (who is called Castiza). The Captain promptly hatches a plan to have Proditor take his wife off his hands. Proditor meanwhile tells him about Phoenix's journey with Fidelio, and says in an aside that Phoenix will not live long. The Captain resolves to seek out advice about divorce from a crafty lawyer he knows.

Scene 3: Another room in the Captain's house

Proditor woos Castiza, but she rebuffs him.

Scene 4: A room in an inn

Phoenix and Fidelio enter an inn where they are lodging. The lawyer Tangle enters with two legal suitors. He is adept at leading such suitors on long chases through the ins and outs of the legal system. He then uses their money to finance his own lawsuits, as he explains to Phoenix: he loves suing people. He exits to speak to the Captain, who has just arrived, and Phoenix laments at how the law has been abused by this man. Tangle and the Captain re-enter and Phoenix learns that the Captain is trying to sell his wife. Phoenix and Fidelio resolve to save the lady.

Scene 5: A street in Ferrara

Enter a Jeweller's wife and her boy. She is engaging in a relationship with an impoverished knight: she gets money from her husband and gives it to him.

Scene 6: A room in Falso's house

Falso's house. He is a Justice of the Peace, who accepts bribes from suitors to give warrants. His servant brings news that his brother has just died, and his niece (Fidelio's sweetheart) is therefore given to him as a ward. He has inherited his brother's wealth, but is charged to give the girl five thousand crowns as a dowry if she marry to his liking. Falso decides that he will marry the girl himself. The jeweller's wife turns out to be Falso's daughter; she introduces the knight as her husband's brother, and Falso offers him lodging at his house, which will facilitate their adultery.

=== Act II ===
Scene 1: A room in the inn

Phoenix and Fidelio are at the Inn, plotting to defeat the Captain and save Fidelio's mother. Fidelio is disguised as a scrivener; Phoenix as a wealthy farmer's son and speculator.

Scene 2: A room in the Captain's house

The Captain tells Castiza that he is selling her; she protests and appeals to his and her honour but can do nothing. Proditor enters, followed by Phoenix and Fidelio. Fidelio makes out a bond, which says that the Captain is selling his right to Castiza—but does not say that she is being sold to Proditor. The Captain, counting out money, is hardly listening, and signs his mark to it. Phoenix holds forth in an aside on the sacredness of matrimony. Fidelio and Phoenix offer themselves as employees to Proditor, pretending to be corrupt. Proditor agrees and exits, saying he will come back for his new woman later. Phoenix and Fidelio uncover themselves to the captain and arraign him. They give the money to Castiza; she gives the Captain a few coins and his liberty and he flees.

Scene 3: A room in Falso's House

Falso, the Knight and the Jeweller's wife. Falso sends the pair off to a private room together; meanwhile he calls his niece to him and woos her. She is disgusted at the incest, and says that her heart is Fidelio's anyway. She would rather be a beggar than yield. Tangle enters—an old friend of Falso's. They have a mock-fencing match, using rapiers and daggers and linking them with specific legal terms and concepts—the writ of delay is the long sword, etc. Tangle "overthrows" Falso and wins the game.

=== Act III ===
Scene 1: Falso's House

Falso's house. He calls for his servants, who have been out robbing a house. They enter in false beards and beg his mercy; he agrees to collude with it. One of the men, Furtivo, was captured in the robbery; Falso regrets that they should have to be dishonest in this unhand way—it's better to be a justice and cheat men openly. Phoenix and Fidelio enter, followed by officers who bring in Furtivo for trial. Falso indulges his vanity by making Furtivo talk about what a good, generous, noble man his master is; he then sentences him to prison—and, apparently on second thoughts, says that actually he can punish him better by taking him into his own care. Phoenix, Fidelio and the officers are fooled; the officers go away satisfied. Meanwhile, Phoenix and Fidelio lurk to see the niece. She enters and tells them that they have been tricked: Furtivo is Falso's own man; also, Falso is trying to force her to commit incest. They realise Falso's wickedness and agree to save her: she is to run away to stay with Castiza, Fidelio's mother.

Scene 2: A street

The Knight making arrangements to meet with the Jeweller's wife again. He will come that night and turn the ring on the door; the maid will know him by that signal and let him in. He will then be given a hundred and fifty coins.

=== Act IV ===
Scene 1: A street before the Jeweller's house and the Court of Law

Proditor tells Phoenix his plan: to pretend to the court that the duke's son had plotted to murder his own father (and presumably, therefore, Proditor plans to kill the duke also). Then when Proditor's own men kill the prince, no one will mind. Phoenix agrees to go along with this. Tangle enters, oppressed by his suitors: he is worried about his own cases and cannot think about theirs at the moment. Falso enters to say that his niece has vanished. A cry from offstage: Tangle's law-cases have been overthrown. Tangle immediately goes mad, babbling law-terms and talking in riddles and visions. Phoenix points out the justice in the madness. Tangle loved to torment others, but now he himself is tormented. Fidelio meanwhile has discovered a miracle—Quieto, a lawyer who has escaped the law, turned peaceable and unlitigious. Phoenix admits that he loves the man for this. Officers meanwhile appear to arrest the knight for his debts.

Scene 2: A room in the Jeweller's house

The Jeweller's House. Phoenix accidentally turns the ring on the door and is admitted by the maid. He is taken to a dark room where the wife (mistaking him for the knight) pays him money and then laments that he has never taken her to court. He agrees that she shall go and gives her a diamond so that she will be known and admitted. Meanwhile, Phoenix is nursing thoughts of returning to his true identity, being "sick of all professions."

Scene 3: A street before the Jeweller's house

The knight is arrested but pleads to be allowed to get some money to pay the debts. The officer knocks the door, but this is not the signal and the maid turns the knight away. The knight is being led to jail but a gentleman intervenes and distracts the officer, allowing the knight to run away.

=== Act V ===
Scene 1: The presence chamber in the Duke of Ferrara's palace

The palace. Proditor enters with Phoenix, Proditor promising him riches if he follow the plan. Various nobles enter, followed by the Duke. Fidelio enters in his proper form, with a paper for the Duke, which he claims is Phoenix's account of his travels. The duke reads it out – and the first section warns him of Proditor's evil plot, saying that even now Proditor has brought in a man to murder him. Phoenix stands up and ‘confesses’ that he is the man. Proditor is aghast and tries to deny everything. Attendants seize Proditor. The paper also accuses two other lords, Lussurioso and Infesto, of riotous living and pimping (something we haven't seen), and phoenix says that he was also hired to help with that. Falso enters to protest the loss of his niece; the Duke reads out the next section, which indicts Falso for abusing the niece and abetting his thieving servants. Phoenix testifies again and the niece confirms it. Falso wonders who has informed against him; Phoenix finally uncovers himself. The Duke is overjoyed and passes all power over to his son. Phoenix banishes Proditor forever for his ugly crimes. He then turns his attention to the other sinners. Fidelio brings in the jeweller's wife, who is accused as a lustful harlot. She promises to live modestly from now on. She is pardoned after the niece intercedes on her behalf. Falso is banned from being a justice and has his money given to the niece as punishment for his crimes The mad Tangle enters and is quietened by Quieto, who purges him of all his law-terms by binding him, forcing his spite and anger to burst out, and finally anointing him with healing balm. He will give up the devil now and pray and live at peace. (This is a long, symbolic ceremony, which brings a sense of harmony.) Phoenix approves of all, and there is peace.
