= Michaelmas Term (play) =

Play by Thomas Middleton

Title page of the first edition of Michaelmas Terme (1607)

Michaelmas (/ˈmɪkəlməs/ MIK-əl-məs) Term is a Jacobean comedy by Thomas Middleton. It was first performed in 1604 by the Children of Paul's, and was entered into the Stationers' Register on 15 May 1607, and published in quarto later that year by Arthur Johnson. A second quarto was printed in 1630 by the bookseller Richard Meighen.

James M. Bromley reads the play's cloth trade as central to its construction of sexuality and sexual relations in the city, drawing on queer theories of materiality.

== Characters ==
- Richard Easy, a gentleman from Essex
- Rearage, Salewood & Cockstone, London gallants
- Ephestian Quomodo, a woollen draper
- Thomasine, Quomodo's wife
- Sim, their son
- Susan, their daughter
- Shortyard & Falselight, Quomodo's cronies
- Boy, Quomodo's servant
- Winifred, Thomasine's maid
- Andrew Lethe, born Andrew Gruel, a Scottish upstart
- Mother Gruel, Lethe's mother
- Dick Hellgill (Pander)
- Country Wench, also Courtesan and Harlot, Lethe's mistress
- Country Wench's Father
- Mother, an old woman
- Mistress Comings, a tirewoman
- Tailor
- Judge
- Dustbox, a scrivener
- Drawer
- Mourners
- Servants
- Officers
- Livery
- Hospital Boys

=== Characters in the Induction ===
- Michaelmas Term
- Boy, his servant
- Hilary, Easter, and Trinity Terms
- Poor Fellow, Page, and Pander, in dumb show

== Synopsis ==
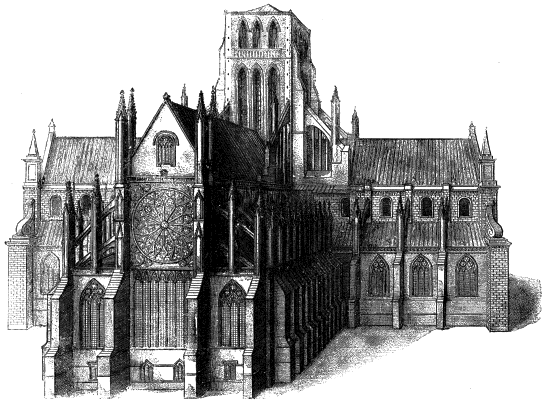
Scene 1, of Michaelmas Term is set in the middle aisle of the Old St Paul's Cathedral, London

In the Induction, a personification of Michaelmas Term changes out of his white "country" cloak and into his black "city cloak" (the devil's favorite color). His servant (a "boy") tells him that several country litigants are on their way to London, planning to use their profits from the harvest to finance lawsuits. Figures representing the other three terms (Trinity, Hilary and Easter) enter, leading a "poor" man who is made "rich" as they present him with rich apparel, a page and a pander. The three terms greet Michaelmas and tell him that several more fools are on their way. They express hope that he will spread the wealth around. Michaelmas promises them that there will be lawsuits enough to last for the next four years.

The main plot follows the woollen draper Ephestian Quomodo, who schemes with his confederates Shortyard and Falselight to defraud the naive Essex gentleman Richard Easy of his lands. A secondary plot concerns the rivalry between the gallant Rearage and the vulgar, newly rich Scottish upstart Andrew Lethe for the hand of Quomodo's daughter Susan, entangled with Lethe's mistreatment of his own mother and his affair with a "Country Wench" brought to the city by the pander Hellgill.

Quomodo, wishing to see how his family and associates will react, fakes his own death and disguises himself as a beadle at his own funeral, only to discover that his son Sim despises him and that his wife Thomasine, secretly relieved by his supposed death, has fallen for Easy. While Quomodo watches in disguise, Shortyard exploits the confusion to strip Sim of his inheritance and quietly restores Easy's lands to him; Thomasine and Easy marry before Quomodo can reveal himself.

The play closes in a judge's court, where Quomodo's fraud is exposed and he is left with only his own folly for punishment, Shortyard and Falselight are banished, Rearage is confirmed as Susan's husband, and Lethe, caught with the Country Wench on his supposed wedding day, is sentenced to marry her instead, to his mother's dismay.

== Bibliography ==
- Middleton, Thomas: Michaelmas Term, ed. by Gail Kern Paster; 2000, Manchester University Press.
- Taylor, Gary, and Trish Thomas Henley, eds.: The Oxford Handbook of Thomas Middleton. Oxford University Press, 2012.
