= The Old Law =

Seventeenth-century tragicomedy written by Thomas Middleton

The Old Law, or A New Way to Please You is a seventeenth-century tragicomedy written by Thomas Middleton, William Rowley, and Philip Massinger. It was first published in 1656, but is generally thought to have been written about four decades earlier.

== The first edition ==
The play first appeared in a badly printed 1656 quarto issued by the bookseller Edward Archer (his shop was "at the sign of the Adam and Eve"), with the three dramatists' names on the title page. Scholars have little doubt about the general accuracy of the attribution; the doubt that does exist centres on the role of Massinger, since the play shows many typical signs of being a Middleton/Rowley collaboration. "Probably all critics are sure of the presence of Middleton and Rowley, but Massinger's contribution has been difficult to trace." David Lake, in his study of attribution problems in the Middleton canon, holds that Massinger's share consisted only of a light revision, and that signs of his hand are strongest in the first half of the single scene in Act V, the trial scene. Lake's breakdown of the play as a whole is this:

Rowley – Act I; Act III, scene 1; Act V, scene 1 (second half);
Middleton – Act II; Act III, scene 2; Act IV, scene 2;
Rowley and Middleton – Act IV, scene 1;
Massinger – Act V, scene 1 (first half).

An earlier study by George Price reached similar conclusions, though Price gave Massinger's revision a larger role in shaping the result. Middleton was primarily responsible for the serious main plot, involving the characters Cleanthes and Simonides and their families, and Rowley the comic subplot involving Gnotho—a division of responsibilities wholly in keeping with their usual manner of collaboration. (Rowley also wrote the opening and closing scenes, as he did in another of his collaborations with Middleton, The Changeling.) Price judged that the 1656 quarto was set into type from a theatre prompt-book.

Critics have placed the original version's date of authorship in the 1614–18 period, based on the limited evidence available; Massinger's revision was done perhaps c. 1626, for a new production by the King's Men.

== Catalogue ==
The quarto of The Old Law is noteworthy in that it included a list of plays published to that date, an expansion of a list published earlier in 1656 in the first edition of The Careless Shepherdess. These were the first attempts to catalogue the entire field of the printed drama of English Renaissance theatre. The list in The Old Law contains 651 titles. The 1656 lists would later be expanded by Francis Kirkman in his play lists of 1661 and 1671.

== Anachronisms ==
The play is set in "Epire", or Epirus, an independent polity in what appears to be Ancient Greece; the characters have Greek names and refer to Lycurgus, Draco, Solon, Plato, and Aristotle. Yet this is a neverland world of literary fairy tale; as William Gifford remarks in his edition of Massinger's works, "To observe upon the utter confusion of all time and place, of all customs and manners, in this drama, would be superfluous; they must be obvious to the most careless observer." One egregious example: despite the putative setting in the ancient world, one character is given a birth date of 1539. (For comparable anachronisms, see The Faithful Friends and Thierry and Theodoret.)

== Synopsis ==
Duke Evander of Epire has promulgated a law that mandates a program of euthanasia: every man who reaches the age of eighty, and every woman who reaches sixty, will be put to death, thrown from a cliff into the sea. (So the statute of the title is not an old law, but a new law that deals with the elderly, a law for the "old"—just as the Elizabethan "poor laws" dealt with the "poor.") The play portrays the consequences of this law, principally in the families of two young men, Simonides and Cleanthes. The cynical and heartless Simonides is delighted with the law, since his elderly father Creon will be put to death and Simonides will come into his inheritance. The virtuous Cleanthes has precisely the opposite reaction. (He also condemns the sexism of the law, observing that "There was no woman in this senate, certain" when the statute was enacted.) Cleanthes is appalled that his father Leonides is facing death—so much so that he and his wife Hippolita devise a plan to fake the old man's demise and hide him away in the countryside.

The two stage a false funeral, at which Cleanthes laughs—and the onlooking courtiers assume he is rejoicing over his impending inheritance. Much of the play is devoted to broad and cynical humour of this type: ruthless people looking forward to the advantages they will gain when a father, mother, husband, or wife is executed. The clown character Gnotho has a wife who will soon fall victim to the law; he takes up with a courtesan in anticipation. An old man named Lysander tries to reclaim his lost youth by dying his white hair and taking lessons from a dancing master. Spendthrift sons, cashiered servants, and lawyers without principles all receive comic examination.

Cleanthes and Hippolita manage to keep their secret for a time, though Hippolita's compassion leads her to betray it. Hippolita's cousin Eugenia is married to the elderly Lysander; when Hippolita observes Eugenia's tears over his looming fate, she tells her cousin about their ruse with Leonides, and advises her to do the same. The virtuous but naive Hippolita does not realise that Eugenia's are crocodile tears, and that Eugenia is already being courted by suitors even as her husband still lives. In time, the good couple learn Eugenia's true nature; their reproofs provoke Eugenia to divulge their secret to the authorities. Leonides is exposed and arrested.

This leads to the play's culmination in the trial scene that fills all of Act V. It is eventually revealed that the Duke's harsh law is a sort of public test of virtue. The old people supposedly executed are in fact still alive, and have been kept in pleasant seclusion. Cleanthes, Hippolita, and the elderly pseudo-victims are promoted to be the judges of a new moral order, with appropriate correction for the guilty.

== See also ==
- Jonathan Swift: A Modest Proposal: For Preventing the Children of Poor People in Ireland from Being a Burden to Their Parents or Country, and for Making Them Beneficial to the Publick (1729)
- Anthony Trollope read the play in 1876 and based his dystopian novel The Fixed Period (1882) on some of the ideas found in The Old Law.
- Keisuke Kinoshita's The Ballad of Narayama (1958), Korean director Kim Ki-young's Goryeojang (1963), and Shohei Imamura's The Ballad of Narayama, which won the Palme d'Or in 1983 uses the concept of Senicide as it applies to the Japanese concept of ubasute.
- Christopher Buckley's 2007 novel Boomsday uses the concept of Senicide as a political ploy to stave off the insolvency of social security in America.
