= The Careless Shepherdess =

Play

The Careless Shepherdess is a Jacobean era stage play, a pastoral tragicomedy generally attributed to Thomas Goffe. Its 1656 publication is noteworthy for the introduction of the first general catalogue of the dramas of English Renaissance theatre ever attempted.

== Date and performance ==
The dates of authorship and first performance for the play are not known with any certainty; the 1619–29 era is usually cited, with "c. 1625" as a common approximation. The play was revived at the Salisbury Court Theatre in 1638, and also was twice performed at Court before King Charles I and Queen Henrietta Maria, in 1629 and 1632. The play was well-enough known to have influenced Ben Jonson as he wrote his final work, The Sad Shepherdess (1637).

== Authorship ==
All of the external evidence, including the 1656 first edition, assigns the authorship of the play to Thomas Goffe; one modern scholar, however, has argued that this may have been an error for John Gough, author of The Strange Discovery.

== Genre ==
The Careless Shepherdess conforms to many of the conventions of the pastoral form as it existed in the years and decades after Sir Philip Sidney's Arcadia. "The play is not lacking in inventiveness, as, for example, the scene in which a threatened duel between two shepherds is frustrated by the threat of the shepherdesses involved to fight the duel themselves; and in that of the carrying off of all the characters by a tribe of satyrs, led by a banished shepherd turned outlaw."

== Catalogue ==
In 1656 the play was first published in quarto by the booksellers Richard Rogers and William Ley. Richards and Ley included with the play text "an Alphabeticall Catalogue of all such Plays that ever were Printed," which listed over 500 titles. In this era, booksellers were only beginning to issue catalogues of their own works; this attempt to catalogue the entire field of contemporary drama publishing was unprecedented. But not unemulated: in the same year The Old Law was published by Edward Archer, with an expanded catalogue listing 651 titles. In 1661 and 1671 the stationer Francis Kirkman printed his own expanded play lists. At a time when trained scholars at the Universities dismissed stage plays as beneath their notice, the tradesmen booksellers stepped in to make these first efforts to bring a kind of order to the field.

Unfortunately, their efforts were limited by a lack of resources and verifiable information. In these 17th-century playlists, the accuracy of the authorial attributions never rises above 50%. Later generations of scholars and commentators have been vocal in their criticisms as a result.

== The praeludium ==
The 1656 quarto of The Careless Shepherdess also provides a preface, or "Praeludium," for the 1638 revival that may have been written by Richard Brome; it features a conversation among four figures — Spruce, a courtier, Spark, an Inns of Court man, Thrift, a London citizen, and Landlord, a country gentleman. The dialogue casts light on the theatrical conditions of the day, and is often quoted and discussed in the scholarly and critical literature on English Renaissance drama.
