= More Dissemblers Besides Women =

Play by Thomas Middleton

More Dissemblers Besides Women is a Jacobean stage play, a tragicomedy written by Thomas Middleton, and first published in 1657.

The play's date of authorship is uncertain, though it is usually dated c. 1615. It is thought to have been acted in 1619, and was performed at Court on 6 January 1624 by the King's Men. In a marginal note in his records, Sir Henry Herbert, the Master of the Revels, called it "the worst play that e'er I saw." King James was not present at the performance, though his son and heir, Prince Charles, soon to be King Charles I, was.

The play was entered into the Stationers' Register on 9 September 1653, by the bookseller Humphrey Moseley, and was published by Moseley together with Middleton's Women Beware Women in a 1657 octavo volume titled Two New Plays.

More Dissemblers Besides Women is set in Milan; its plot involves romantic intrigues among the ruling aristocrats of the city, including the widowed Duchess, the General Lactantio, and the Cardinal. Having given her dying husband a vow to remain chaste after his death, the Duchess fools the Cardinal into thinking that she has fallen in love with his nephew Lactantio—which quickly inspires the ambitious Cardinal to switch from an ardent champion of chastity to an advocate of an advantageous marriage for his relative.

The play has been cited as "the only play of the period to feature a pregnant female page. In this work, the heroine's male persona kindles homoerotic desire in a buffoonish adult male character, even as her power as a cross-dressed woman is undercut by a farcical treatment of her pregnancy and the onset of labor."

== Characters ==
- Duchess of Milan, a widow
- Celia, her waiting-gentlewoman
- Lord Cardinal of Milan
- Lactantio, his nephew
- Dondolo, Lactantio's man-servant
- Andrugio, General of Milan
- Aurelia, mistress formerly to Andrugio, now to Lactantio
- Aurelia's Father
- Governor of the Fort, suitor to Aurelia
- Lactantio's former mistress disguised as a Page
- Lords of Milan
- A Cupid
- Captain of the Gypsies
- Other Gypsies
- Crotchet, a singing master
- Cinquepace, a dancing master
- Usher to Cinquepace
- Servants
- Officers of the Guard

== Synopsis ==
=== Act I ===
Scene 1: Milan: The Duchess' balcony (above) and street (below)

Lactantio praises the Duchess, who, according to a vow made upon her husband's death, has remained abstinent for seven years. He asks his lover, Aurelia, if she would follow the Duchess' example if he died. Aurelia replies that she would drop dead on the spot if Lactantio died. Lactantio tells Aurelia that, although he plans to marry her, they must keep their relationship a secret for the time being for the sake of his uncle, the Lord Cardinal, an extremely pious man who eschews the company of women. Lactantio is the Lord Cardinal's only heir, but to inherit his estate, he must keep the old man happy by seeming to shun the company of women. Lactantio also mentions that his uncle is a great admirer of the Duchess' constancy.

Scene 2: The Lord Cardinal's home: The Lord Cardinal's study

The Lord Cardinal praises the Duchess' constancy to a group of Lords. He says that he has written several books celebrating the Duchess' strict adherence to her vow. The First Lord points out that the Duchess' constancy would be even more commendable if it were tested. He suggests that, rather than being hidden away from all men, the Duchess should be presented with some sort of temptation. The Lord Cardinal agrees that the Duchess should be tested to prove her perfection. The Lords exit. The Lord Cardinal calls for his nephew, Lactantio. He mentions how pleased he is that Lactantio, like himself, is totally uninterested in women. Lactantio enters reading a book. He takes great pains to demonstrate his (supposed) seriousness and distaste for women. Lactantio's former mistress enters disguised as a page. (The mistress has been posing as a boy page so she could live—and sleep—with Lactantio without arousing the Lord Cardinal's suspicions.) In a whisper, Lactantio asks the "Page" why she looks so pale. The "Page" tells him that she is pregnant. She gives him a letter announcing the arrival of a gentleman friend from Rome. Lactantio realises that the "Gentleman" is, in fact, his lover, Aurelia. He tells the "Page" to welcome the "Gentleman" in. Aurelia enters disguised as a gentleman. The Lord Cardinal insists that the "Gentleman" stay as a guest in his home for as long as he is in Milan. The "Gentleman" accepts the invitation. The Lord Cardinal exits. Lactantio takes Aurelia into his arms and urges her to renounce her former lover, General Andrugio. Aurelia swears that she loves Lactantio alone, but notes that he may have some other competition: her father is pushing her to marry the Governor of the Fort, an extremely elderly gentleman whom Aurelia does not care for at all. Lactantio barely has time to reply before Aurelia's father enters, accompanied by the Old Governor of the Fort. Aurelia worries that she will be discovered. Lactantio greets Aurelia's father and introduces Aurelia as a foreigner who does not speak the language. Aurelia babbles a bit of gobbledygook in a supposedly foreign tongue, but her father is not fooled for a second. He scolds his daughter for her ridiculous ruse and "gives" her to the Old Governor of the Fort on the spot. Aurelia, her father and the Old Governor of the Fort all exit. Lactantio curses Aurelia's father and worries about how he will excuse the "Gentleman's" absence to his uncle.

Scene 3: The Duchess' balcony (above) and street (below)

The Duchess is sitting in her balcony (above). She tells her serving-woman, Celia, how happy she is because she has adhered to her vow. The Lord Cardinal enters and tells the Duchess that, to prove her perfection, her constancy must be tested—she must be exposed to a desirable man. The Duchess agrees to be tested. The Cardinal tells her to look down at the street, where a procession celebrating the recent victories of General Andrugio will soon pass by. The Lord Cardinal exits. Trumpets sound, and General Andrugio enters in a procession below. He is accompanied by several nobles, including Lactantio, who sing his praises. As part of the procession, a winged Cupid descends and sings a song in General Andrugio's honour. While the Cupid is singing, a Lord passes General Andrugio a letter. Andrugio reads the letter. The nobles sing some further praises and exit. Andrugio seems sad. In an aside, the Lord who delivered the letter says that Andrugio is upset because he has just received news of Aurelia's impending marriage to the Old Governor of the Fort (remember that Aurelia was Andrugio's former lover). Meanwhile, above on the balcony, the Duchess confesses that she has failed the Lord Admiral's test—she has fallen in love with General Andrugio at first sight!

Scene 4: The Lord Constable's house: servants' quarters

The "Page" asks Lactantio's man-servant, Dondolo, to dry a shirt for her. In a rambling speech filled with sexual innuendo and jokes about the "Page's" disguised pregnancy, Dondolo says he will not do anything for the "Page" unless she agrees to sing a song for him. The "Page" sings a bawdy song about Cupid. Dondolo is pleased.

=== Act II ===
Scene 1: The palace

The Duchess orders Celia to bring her some colourful dresses. She does not want to wear mourning clothes any longer now that she is in love. Celia exits to get the clothes. Speaking to herself, the Duchess says that she will have to use trickery to win Andrugio's love. Overwhelmed by the complexities of her new situation, she busts into tears. The Lord Cardinal enters. He assumes that the Duchess is crying for her dead husband and tries to console her. The Duchess tells the Lord Cardinal that, after many years of mourning, desire has finally overcome the strength of her constancy: she has fallen in love with another man. The Lord Cardinal is shocked and extremely upset to hear this news. He demands to know the name of the man the Duchess has fallen in love with. The Duchess tells him she has fallen in love with his nephew, Lactantio (by this ruse, she hopes to warm the Lord Cardinal up to the idea of her remarrying, thereby opening the door for a match with Andrugio). Rather than reacting with delight (as the Duchess had hoped), the Lord Cardinal vows to banish Lactantio from the city. He exits. The Duchess laments her inability to soften the Lord Admiral up.

Scene 2: The Lord Cardinal's residence: The Lord Cardinal's study

Soliloquizing in his study alone, the Lord Cardinal decides that his nephew cannot be blamed for the Duchess' attraction to him. He decides not to banish Lactantio, and to allow a relationship with the Duchess to go ahead.

Scene 3: The castle

Andrugio disguises himself as an old soldier and goes to the castle, where Aurelia is being held prisoner by the Old Governor of the Fort. Aurelia is extremely happy to see Andrugio. She swears her never-ending love to him. Andrugio promises to rescue her soon. He exits. Speaking to herself, Aurelia says she will dump Andrugio and return to Lactantio as soon as she has been rescued.

=== Act III ===
Scene 1: The Lord Cardinal's residence

Increasingly anxious about her pregnancy, the "Page" begs Lactantio to make good on his promise to marry her. Lactantio scornfully replies that he has promised to marry scores of mistresses and has no intention of marrying any of them. The "Page" bursts into tears. Dondolo enters. He has just returned from the castle, where he had been sent to spy on Aurelia. Lactantio asks him what he has learned. Dondolo says that he could not manage to actually speak with Aurelia, but was able to communicate by means of sign language. All of the "signs" that he reports receiving from Aurelia are of an absurd and bawdy nature. Lactantio scolds Dondolo for his nonsense and calls him an ass. Dondolo criticises Lactantio's "Page," whom he says is good for nothing. He makes a series of sly remarks regarding the "Page's" disguised gender (Lactantio is apparently unaware that Dondolo has seen through the "Page's" disguise). Lactantio calls Dondolo a fool. In an aside, Dondolo swears to get revenge on Lactantio for calling him a fool. He makes plans to join the Gypsies, and meditates happily on the freedoms afforded by a Gypsy lifestyle. He exits. Lactantio professes his hatred for Aurelia's former lover, Andrugio. He worries that Andrugio will use Aurelia's captivity as a means to ply his way back into Aurelia's heart. The Lord Cardinal enters. The "Page" is still weeping. The Lord Cardinal says that Lactantio is too strict with the "Page." He says that he will assign her to a new master: the Duchess herself. The "Page" has no choice but to accept this new appointment. She exits—now more distressed than ever. Arguing that Lactantio has been too severe in his rejection of women, the Lord Cardinal declares that it is time for his nephew to marry. Still posing as a "serious nephew," Lactantio rejects the suggestion. The Lord Cardinal tells Lactantio that the Duchess herself is in love with him and cannot live without him. Lactantio is secretly overjoyed by this news, but maintains his "serious nephew" guise for his uncle's sake. The Lord Cardinal encourages him to go to the Duchess and proclaim his love. Lactantio "reluctantly" agrees to follow his uncle's wishes. He exits. A group of lords enters. The Lord Cardinal delivers a speech arguing that the Duchess has kept her vow for too long and should be encouraged to remarry. The lords are persuaded by the Lord Cardinal's argument. They make plans to persuade the Duchess to choose a new husband.

Scene 2: The palace

Celia tells the Duchess that Lactantio secretly hates Andrugio (it is not clear how she gained knowledge of Lactantio's inner thoughts). The Duchess says that she can use this information to her advantage. Lactantio enters. The Duchess tells Lactantio that she loves him madly. Lactantio quickly agrees to marry her. The Duchess asks Lactantio if he has any enemies. Lactantio tells her that he has only one enemy: General Andrugio. The Duchess makes plans to set a trap for Andrugio (but it's actually a trap for Lactantio). She tells Lactantio to forge a letter in Andrugio's hand. In the phony letter, "Andrugio" makes a bold declaration of his love for the Duchess. Lactantio signs Andrugio's name to the letter and gives it to the Duchess. The Duchess instructs Lactantio to arrest Andrugio and bring him to her.

=== Act IV ===
Scene 1: Outside the castle

Andrugio waits outside the castle to rescue Aurelia, but Aurelia does not show up to meet him at the appointed time. Lactantio enters with a guard and arrests Andrugio. Andrugio begs them to wait a bit, but Lactantio insists on taking him away immediately.

Scene 2: Outside the castle

Aurelia escapes from the castle disguised as a gypsy. She is surprised to find that Andrugio is not waiting for her. Dondolo enters. He is very happy to meet a "real" Gypsy. He asks the "Gypsy Girl" (Aurelia) where her company is. Aurelia recognises Dondolo immediately. She asks if he is Lactantio's servant. Dondolo haughtily replies that he serves no man. He says that he has left his master to pursue a Gypsy lifestyle. Before Aurelia has a chance to press Dondolo further, a company of Gypsies enters singing and dancing. The Gypsy Captain addresses Aurelia in a strange Gypsy language (this language includes words such as "piss-kitch.") Aurelia tells him that she cannot understand the Gypsy language because she has only recently turned to the Gypsy lifestyle. The Gypsy captain welcomes her with good cheer. Dondolo requests admittance into the Gypsy company. The Gypsy Captain picks Dondolo's pocket while he reads his palm. Dondolo tries to pay the Gypsy Captain and realises that his money has been stolen. Exceedingly impressed, he begs the captain to teach him the art of Gypsy thievery. The Gypsy Captain tells Dondolo that he will have everything he desires. He gives him the new "Gypsy Girl" (this is the second time that Aurelia has been "given" to an undesirable male) and instructs him to get her pregnant so she produce Gypsy children. Dondolo is very pleased. The Gypsy Captain marks Dondolo's face with bacon (to "Gypsify" him) and instructs him to go out and steal as much as he can for the company. Aurelia's father and the Old Governor of the Fort enter. They are searching for Aurelia. Aurelia is afraid she will be discovered. The Old Governor encourages Aurelia's father to ask for the Gypsies "supernatural" assistance to help them locate Aurelia. Aurelia's father is wary of the Gypsies. The Old Governor of the Fort gives Aurelia some money and asks her to tell him his fortune. Aurelia tells him that the woman he is looking for will board a ship soon. She advises him to forget the woman and leave her alone because she will never return his love. Aurelia's father and the Old Governor of the Fort rush off to the docks to prevent Aurelia's supposed departure. The Gypsies are very impressed by Aurelia's fortune-telling skills. They dance and drink for joy.

Scene 3: The palace

The Lord Cardinal and a group of lords encourage the Duchess to remarry. The Duchess feigns reluctance. The Lord Cardinal and lords exit. The Duchess soliloquises about Lord Cardinal's hypocrisy. The "Page" enters. The Duchess is quite impressed by "him." She makes plans to provide "him" with a good education, which will include singing and dancing lessons. The "Page" exits. Lactantio enters with Andrugio and a guard. Andrugio proclaims his innocence and asks the Duchess why he has been arrested. The Duchess asks Lactantio and the guard to leave. When they are gone, the Duchess shows Andrugio the phony letter (supposedly written by Andrugio, but actually written by Lactantio). She orders him to read the letter aloud. Andrugio insists that he did not write the letter. The Duchess brushes his protestations aside and tells him that the letter has won her heart: she is in love with him. Before Andrugio has time to answer, the Duchess orders Lactantio and the guard to take Andrugio to the palace prison. Andrugio is completely baffled. He worries that the Duchess' attention will ruin his chances of reuniting with Aurelia.

=== Act V ===
Scene 1: The palace

The "Page" is taking music lessons. Celia supervises. The music teacher teaches the "Page" how to sing a "prick song" (a song performed from written music, with a quibble here on "prick," another word for "penis," pertinent here because the "Page" secretly does not have one—jokes like these are fundamental to this scene). After a series of incidents that make the "Page's" situation increasingly awkward, Celia dismisses the music teacher and introduces Cinquepace, the dancing teacher. Celia exits. An usher enters to play a viol. Cinquepace tells the "Page" to dance. In an aside, the "Page" worries that dancing might kill her. She tells Cinquepace that she does not know how to dance. Cinquepace threatens to pull down the "Page's" pants and spank "him" if "he" will not dance. The "Page" leaps, falls, and goes into labour. She calls for a midwife. Cinquepace is completely baffled.

Scene 2; The palace

Celia tells the Duchess that Andrugio has paid one of his prison guards to find a "Gypsy Girl" (Aurelia) for him. The "Gypsy Girl" was brought to Andrugio's prison cell, where he greeted her with kisses and a passionate embrace. The Duchess is shocked and jealous. She calls for the "Gypsy Girl" to be brought before her. Aurelia enters, still disguised as a Gypsy. The Duchess asks the "Gypsy Girl" if Andrugio truly loves her. Aurelia replies in the affirmative and says Andrugio has promised to marry her. The Duchess worries that Andrugio might be crazy. She tells the "Gypsy Girl" to go away. Aurelia exits. The Duchess calls for Andrugio. Andrugio enters. The Duchess asks if he is truly in love with a Gypsy girl. Andrugio says that he is not. The Duchess calls for the "Gypsy Girl" again to get to the bottom of the story. Aurelia re-enters, no longer disguised as a Gypsy. Aurelia and Andrugio beg for the Duchess' pardon. The Duchess is relieved to learn that Andrugio is not crazy. She commends the couple and says that she will not get in the way of their love. Lactantio enters. Aurelia asks the Duchess if she is truly free to marry whomever she pleases. The Duchess replies in the affirmative. Aurelia says that, in that case, she would like to marry her heart's true love: Lactantio. Worried that his chances for marrying the Duchess will be ruined, Lactantio calls Aurelia a fool and says that he no longer has any interest in her whatsoever. Realizing she has just let two prospective husbands slip through her fingers, Aurelia begs Andrugio to forgive her. Andrugio rejects her. The Lord Cardinal enters with a group of lords. He tells the Duchess that it is time for her to announce the name of the man she has decided to marry (assuming she will name Lactantio). The Duchess feigns offence and says that she has no intention of ever breaking her vow. "The Page" enters. She is no longer disguised as a boy and carries an infant in her arms. The Duchess tells the Lord Cardinal that Lactantio is the baby's father. The Lord Cardinal vows to disinherit Lactantio, but the Duchess insists that he has already been punished enough. She offers to provide ten thousand ducats for the "Page's" dowry so she can marry Lactantio. The play ends on a note of festivity.
