= John Edwards (Siôn Treredyn) =

John Edwards (who used the pseudonym Siôn Treredyn) (1605/6 – December 1656) was a Welsh Anglican priest and translator.

== Life ==
Edwards was born in Caldicot, Monmouthshire in 1605 or 1606 and matriculated at Jesus College, Oxford in 1624 aged eighteen. He graduated with a Bachelor of Arts degree in 1626 and a Master of Arts degree in 1629. He was ordained as a priest in the Church of England and was appointed to the parish of Llanmartin, Monmouthshire in 1629. Four years later, he moved to the parish of Tredunnock, Monmouthshire, and this was the basis of his pseudonym "Siôn Treredyn". He was deprived of his post in Tredunnock in 1649, but remained in the parish until his death in December 1656.

== Work ==
Edwards translated Marrow of Modern Divinity by Edward Fisher into Welsh and his translation was published in Bristol in 1651 as Madruddyn y difinyddiaeth diweddaraf. His aim was to encourage books to be produced in Welsh, and he noted with regret in the preface that Welshmen moving to England would learn English, but few English clergymen and scholars moving to Wales would learn Welsh. His aim was not fulfilled, as it was a further fifty years before any major literature was published in Welsh. His own translation had various grammatical errors, reflecting the poor state of Welsh in Monmouthshire at that time.
