= Francis Osborne =

English writer

Francis Osborne (26 September 1593 – 4 February 1659) was an English essayist, known for his Advice to a Son, which became a very popular book soon after the English Restoration.

== Life ==
According to his epitaph, Osbourne was born on 26 September 1593. He was the fifth and youngest son of Sir John Osborne of Chicksands Priory, Shefford, Bedfordshire, by his wife Dorothy, daughter and coheiress of Richard Barlee of Effingham Hall, Essex. Sir John Osborne was the son of Peter Osborne.

Francis was educated privately at Chicksands. Coming to London as a youth, he hung about the court and attracted the notice of William Herbert, 3rd Earl of Pembroke, who made him his master of the horse. Subsequently, he was employed for a time in the office of the lord treasurer's remembrancer, which was presided over successively by his father and his eldest brother Peter.

In politics and religion he sympathised with the popular party in parliament, but, although a close observer of public life, took no active part in it. After residing for a time at North Fambridge, Essex, he moved in about 1650 to Oxford to supervise the education of his son, John, and there printed a series of historical, political, and ethical tracts.

He married Anna, sister of William Draper, a colonel in the parliamentary army and a parliamentary visitor of the university. They had three daughters, as well as one son John, to whom his Advice to a Son was written. Through Draper's influence, Osborne obtained a small official employment under the Commonwealth. After the publication of his Advice to a Son in 1656, he gained a wide reputation, and paid many visits to London and reckoned the philosopher Thomas Hobbes among his friends. He died at Draper's house at Nether Worton, near Deddington, Oxfordshire, on 11 February 1659, and was buried in the church there. His son John Osborne moved to Ireland, where he became Prime Serjeant, and died there in 1692.

== Advice to a Son ==
Osborne's chief publication was his Advice to a Son, in two parts, of which the first was published in 1656, 'printed for H. Hath, printer to the university for Thomas Robinson,' and the second in 1658. The first part, which was divided into five sections, headed Studies, Love and Marriage, Travel, Government, and Religion, appeared without an author's name; it became popular at once, and after it had passed through five editions within two years Osborne declared himself the author. In 1658 the second part appeared, and he dedicated it under his own name to Draper, at the same time issuing a new edition of the first part, with his name on the title page.

The warnings against women with which he plied his son give the book a misogynist character, and it was ridiculed by John Heydon in his Advice to a Daughter, in opposition to Advice to a Son, 1658. A defence of Osborne appeared in Advice to Balaam's Ass, by Thomas Pecke, whom Heydon castigated in the second edition of his Advice to a Daughter, 1659. In Osborne's day his Advice to a Son found admirers among the young scholars at Oxford, but the clergy detected atheism in its vague references to religion, and denounced its evil influence. On 27 July 1658 the vice-chancellor, John Conant, accordingly summoned the Oxford booksellers before him, and told them to sell no more copies of Osborne's book; but this direction caused the Advice, according to Anthony à Wood, to sell far more copies.

At a later date Samuel Pepys studied it, and Sir William Petty told him that the three most popular books of his time were Osborne's Advice, Thomas Browne's Religio Medici, and Samuel Butler's Hudibras. Jonathan Swift wrote of Osborne in The Tatler as one who affected the phrases in fashion at court in his day, and soon became either unintelligible or ridiculous. James Boswell found the Advice shrewd, quaint, and lively; but Samuel Johnson told Boswell that Osborne was conceited: "Were a man to write so now, the boys would throw stones at him."

== Other works ==
His Traditional Memoirs of the Reigns of Q. Elizabeth and King James I, 1658, supplies court gossip. This tract was reprinted by Sir Walter Scott in his Secret History of James I (Edinburgh, 1811). Other works by Osborne were: 1. A Seasonable Expostulation with the Netherlands, declaring their Ingratitude to and the Necessity of their Agreement with the Commonwealth of England, Oxford, 1652. 2. Persuasive to mutual Compliance under the present Government, and Plea for a Free State compared with Monarchy, 1652. 3. Political Reflections upon the Government of the Turks, with 'discourses' on Machiavelli, Luther, Nero's death, and other topics, 1656. 4. Miscellany of sundry Essays, Paradoxes, Problematical Discourses, Letters, and Characters, together with political Deductions from the History of the Earl of Essex,' London, 1659. All these works were subsequently bound together, and entitled Osborne's Works. The collective edition of 1673 was brought to the notice of the House of Lords on 13 March 1676, on the ground that its incidental vindication of a republican form of government in England rendered it a seditious and treasonable publication. Reissues followed in 1682 (8th edit.), 1689 (9th edit.), 1701 (10th edit.), and 1722, in 2 vols. (11th edit.) To the last are prefixed a memoir of Osborne and many previously unprinted letters addressed by him to Colonel Draper between 1653 and 1658.

Osborne has also been credited, apparently wrongly, with Private Christian's non ultra, or a Plea for the Layman's interpreting the Scriptures, Oxford, 1650, (anon.); with A Dialogue of Polygamy (London, 1657), translated from the Italian of Bernardino Ochino by 'a person of quality', and dedicated to the author of the Advice; and William Sprigge's A modest Plea for an equal Commonwealth against Monarchy.

== Works ==
- Advice to a Son (1656–1658)
- Political Reflections of the Government of the Turks
- Historical Memoires on the Reigns of Queen Elizabeth and King James (1658)
