= Advice to a Son =

1656 anti-matrimony book

Advice to a Son is a 1656 anti-matrimony book by the English essayist Francis Osborne. This was his primary effort, published in two halves in 1656 and 1658 respectively. The first half had five topical sections: "Studies", "Love and Marriage", "Travel", "Government", and "Religion". Despite being published anonymously at first, the book received major traction in the era following the English Restoration.

== Warnings against women and misogynist tone ==
The warnings against women with which he plied his son give the book a misogynist character, and it was ridiculed by John Heydon in his Advice to a Daughter, in opposition to Advice to a Son, 1658. A defence of Osborne appeared in Advice to Balaam's Ass, by Thomas Pecke, whom Heydon castigated in a second edition of his Advice to a Daughter, 1659. In Osborne's day his Advice to a Son found admirers among the young scholars at Oxford, but the clergy detected atheism in its vague references to religion, and denounced its evil influence.

== An attempt to ban the book increased its sales ==
On 27 July 1658 the vice-chancellor, John Conant summoned the Oxford booksellers before him, and told them sell no more copies of Osborne's book; but this direction caused the Advice, according to Anthony à Wood, to sell far more copies.

== Literary reputation ==
At a later date Samuel Pepys studied it, and Sir William Petty told him that the three most popular books of his time were Osborne's Advice, Thomas Browne's Religio Medici, and Samuel Butler's Hudibras. Jonathan Swift wrote of Osborne in The Tatler as one who affected the phrases in fashion at court in his day, and soon became either unintelligible or ridiculous. James Boswell found the Advice shrewd, quaint, and lively; but Samuel Johnson told Boswell that Osborne was conceited: "Were a man to write so now, the boys would throw stones at him." The book is considered an example of "Courtesy literature", a descendant of such books as The Book of the Courtier.
