= The Platonick Lovers =

Play written by William Davenant

The Platonick Lovers is a Caroline era stage play which blends the genres of tragicomedy, satire, and comedy of manners. It was written by Sir William Davenant and first printed in 1636. The play can be regarded as one of the more subtle and successful satires in the English language: Davenant managed to ridicule the obsession of his employer without losing his job.

The play was licensed for performance by Sir Henry Herbert, the Master of the Revels, on Nov. 16, 1635, and was acted by the King's Men at the Blackfriars Theatre. It was first published in quarto in 1636 by the bookseller Richard Meighen. Davenant dedicated the play to his patron Henry Jermyn, who was the favourite of Queen Henrietta Maria. A second edition followed in 1665, in which The Platonick Lovers is paired with Davenant's comedy The Wits.

The Platonick Lovers has been called a "minor masterpiece" of satire. Davenant sought and attained the patronage of Henrietta Maria, the queen consort of King Charles I. Henrietta Maria had revived the medieval tradition of courtly love which had been popular at the French court, where she had grown up. Davenant wrote several works in honor of the Queen, most notably the final masques staged at the Stuart Court, from The Temple of Love (1635) through Luminalia (1638) and Salmacida Spolia (1640). The Platonick Lovers is thought to have been written either at her orders or on her request. In his prologue, Davenant wrote that the title of his play might be above the heads of the common people, but that the Court would appreciate it.

...the Title needs must cause
From the indulgent Court, a kind applause,
Since there hee learn't it first, and had command
T'interpret what hee scarce doth understand.

Yet Davenant subtly manages "to expose the snobbery of Platonic love" and to poke fun at its pretensions.

Theander and Eurithea, the title characters, originally feel only courtly, intellectual love for each other. It is not until Theander is given medicine to "cure" him of his chastity that he sees women as existing primarily as objects meant solely for men's desire. At that point, the "unnatural" courtly and intellectual love between equals turns to "natural" physical love between a controlling man and his submissive wife.

This bounty had been excellent, when you
Had privilege to give, or to deny; but now
Your charter's out of date, and mine
Begins to rule: the Priest attends below
To celebrate our Nuptiall rites, which is
The happy houre that doth advance
The husband's government; come, to the Chappell, Love.

Theander and Eurithea's high-flown love is also contrasted with the physical love between Phylomont and Ariola, brother to Eurithea and sister to Theander respectively. Davenant shows how (at least at the beginning of the play) Theander and Eurithea are free to kiss and to touch, as their idealized love does not tempt them, but that Phylomont and Ariola, whose love is more physical, must remain physically chaste before their wedding.

The play was one of Davenant's major successes, and was frequently revived. Its satire appears never to have registered on the author's patron: The Platonick Lovers was one of Henrietta Maria's favorite plays as late as the 1660s.

== Sources ==
- Broom, Wendell W. An old-spelling critical edition of William Davenant's The platonic[k] lovers by Sir William D'Avenant. New York: Garland Press, 1987. ISBN 0-8240-8402-0.
- Logan, Terence P., and Denzell S. Smith, eds. The Later Jacobean and Caroline Dramatists: A Survey and Bibliography of Recent Studies in English Renaissance Drama. Lincoln, NE, University of Nebraska Press, 1978.
- MacGuire, Nancy Klein. Regicide and Restoration: English Tragicomedy 1660–1671. Cambridge, Cambridge University Press, 1992.
