= Thomas Goffe =

17th-century English playwright

Thomas Goffe (1591–1629) was a minor Jacobean dramatist.

== Life ==
Thomas Goffe was born in Essex in 1591. He first studied at Westminster School where he had the status of a Queen's Scholar. Goffe received a scholarship on 3 November 1609 to attend Christ Church, Oxford. Here he received his bachelor of arts (B.A.) on 17 June 1613 and continued to get his master of arts (M.A.), on 20 June 1616. While involved with acting and writing plays at Christ Church, Goffe continued school. On 3 July 1623, he acquired his bachelor of divinity and became licensed to preach shortly after on 11 July 1623. Goffe was asked to be a rector of the church in East Clandon, Surrey after receiving his B.D., an offer worth about eight pounds a year.(1) However, Goffe began delivering Latin orations and writing poems in tribute to Sir Thomas Bodley and Queen Anne of Denmark as well as to the dean of Christ Church, William Godwin.

He lived alone the majority of his life because of his dislike for women. He was considered a women-hater and lived as a bachelor until he gave in to a woman and married her in East Clandon. This woman was the widow of Goffe's predecessor and had pretended to fall in love with his preaching. He was warned by his good friend from Oxford, Thomas Thimble, that she will eventually break his heart and he would be better off without her. Unfortunately, Goffe went with his gut instinct, and was tortured by the marriage. She was consistently stubborn and disrespectful towards Goffe and his friends. For instance, when few of Goffe's friends from Oxford stopped by Goffe's house, his wife looked at them with an "ill Eye" and served then eggs and milk for dinner. Embarrassed by his wife's actions, Goffe ordered a better dinner for his friends the following night and gave them some wine. His wife and her children from her previous marriage continued to disrespect Goffe and are blamed for his death which occurred on 27 July 1629, shortly after his wedding day.

== His work ==
Thomas Goffe was an active playwright during his days at Christ Church. Since it is unknown the order in which his plays were written, scholars believe that his first play was most likely The Raging Turk, also titled Bajazet II. The play is a tragedy and was produced at Christ Church circa 1613–1618. However, the play was published after his death in 1631. Goffe's second play in believed to be The Tragedy of Orestes which was produced circa 1613–1618 and published in 1633. His final play produced at the Christ Church was The Courageous Turk, or Amurath the First. It was produced on 21 September 1618 and published in 1632. All of his plays were published in 1 volume as Three Excellent Tragedies in 1656.

There is no evidence available to verify the dates of these three plays. However, the structure, crude dialogue, and the use of, Richard Knolles's The General Historie of the Turkes as a source of inspiration, suggest that The Raging Turk is Goffe's first play. Furthermore, Goffe's The Courageous Turk, contains a few lines from the prologue that imply this was the third play to be acted in front of Christ Church. The lines are as follows:

"Our hope which intends,/ The sacred Muses Progeny to greet,/ Which under roofe, now the third time meet…"

The Raging Turk is a tragedy of Emperor Bajazet II, who is desperately trying to hold onto his power. However, plotting sons, and a usurping brother prevent him from doing so. While trying to prevent his successor, confusion consumes the people, and leads to the death of at least 16 lives. The end of the play resolves with Bajazet being poisoned, and his grandson Solyman is crowned emperor. Many scholars believe in this play, “Goffe appears to be fascinated with the reputed evil of the Turks and their insatiable greed.

The Tragedy of Orestes is the story of Aegisthus’s murder of Agamemnon with Clytemnestra’s help. Orestes, unsure of who murdered his father, asks the help of his good friend, Plyades. Together, the two of them dress in disguise and let it be rumoured that they have killed themselves by jumping off a cliff. Orestes is told that if he brings his fathers bones to a magic woman named Canidia, she will reveal his father’s murderer. When the truth is revealed, Orestes kills the baby born of Aegisthus and his mother and forces the parents to drink the child’s blood. After Aegisthus and Clytemnestra are killed on stage, Orestes is denied the crown and banished. Eventually, Orestes and Pylades die by running on each other’s sword.

The Courageous Turk breaks into two parts. The first part is concerned with Amurath’s passion for his concubine Eumorphe, his officers’ discontent with Amurath’s affair, and death of Eumorphe. The second part contains a series of events consisting of Amurath’s various war exploits in Serbia (Battle of Kosovo), the Christians' martial confusion, the marriage of Amurath's son Bajazet to Hatam, Amurath's conflict with his son-in-law Aladin, the mutual stabbing deaths of Amurath and the Christian Capitan Cobelitz, and the raising of Bajazet to Emperor with the subsequent death of his brother Jacup.

== Criticism and controversy ==
Goffe's The Courageous Turk has received some unfavorable criticism. It has been called "all but unendurable" because of its "outrageous rant and bombast" by Felix Shelling in Elizabethan Drama (1908) and also called a "repulsive bombast" by Adolphus Ward in A History of English Dramatic Literature to the Death of Queen Anne (1875). However, The Courageous Turk's audience in the seventeenth-century liked the play because of the character of Amurath, the elaborate staging, the subject of Turkish history, and Goffe's vision the frailty of kings and the ultimate reward given to Christians who fought against earth's heathens.

There is specific evidence that suggests that Goffe knew of and responded to Seneca's Phoenissae. Two of his tragedies, Tragedy of Orestes and The Courageous Turk, contain speeches translated from Seneca's play. In The Courageous Turk, the speeches of a Turkish princess intervening in a quarrel between her father and husband are liberally adapted from a scene in Phoenissae in which Jocasta, the wife of Oedipus, comes between her warring sons. Ben Jonson said, in a conversation recorded by Bishop Plume, "So Tom Goff brings in Etiocles and Polynices." Ben Jonson was much admired at Christ Church, and may have been invited to read a manuscript play by Goffe on the theme of the Phoenissae. In addition, unlike many writers and producers of academic drama in the Jacobean era, Goffe was not contemptuous of popular theatre, and included many scenes and lines that were influenced by Hamlet and Antonio's Revenge in his tragedy, Orestes. Phoenissae has also been attributed to Goffe. It was probably performed at Christ Church in 1619 but is now lost.

Goffe is also believed by some to have authored The Careless Shepherdess, a pastoral that was probably produced at Christ Church between 1618 and 1629, and later revised and produced by Queen Henrietta's Men around 1638. However, the argument against this belief is that Goffe could not have authored the pastoral because of the statement on the title page of The Careless Shepherdess, which states that it was acted at Salisbury Court, a theatre that did not open until after Goffe died.

== Writings by Thomas Goffe ==
- The Raging Turk or Bajazet II, Christ Church, Oxford, circa 1613–1618.
- The Tragedy of Orestes, Christ Church, Oxford, circa 1613–1618.
- The Courageous Turk, or Amurath the First, Christ Church, Oxford, 21 September 1618.
- The Careless Shepherdess, attributed with reservations to Goffe, Christ Church, Oxford, circa 1618–1629.
- Phoenissae, Christ Church, Oxford, 1619.
- Deliverance from the Grave. A sermon preached at Saint Maries Spittle, in London, on Wednesday 28 March 1627.
