= Richard Knolles =

English historian and translator (c.1545–1610)

Richard Knolles (c. 1545 – July 1610) was an English historian and translator, known for his historical account of the Ottoman Empire, the first major description in the English language.

== Life ==
A native of Northamptonshire, Knolles was born in the 1540s, probably at Cold Ashby. He was educated at Lincoln College, Oxford, where he graduated with a BA in January 1565. Knolles then became a fellow at Lincoln College, and obtained his MA there in July 1570. Some time after 1571, he left Oxford to become headmaster at a grammar school in Sandwich, Kent, which was founded by Sir Roger Manwood in about 1563.

After Manwood's death in 1592, his son, Sir Peter became Knolles' professional and literary patron and encouraged him to write.

Knolles died in Sandwich in July 1610, and was buried in St Mary's church.

== Works ==
In 1603, Knolles published his Generall Historie of the Turkes, of which several editions subsequently appeared, among them Sir Paul Rycaut's edition (1700). Rycaut's edition includes his account of his time in Constantinople as secretary to the English ambassador. While the topic of the Turks was very popular during the period in which Knolles wrote, with an estimated 1,000 works about the Turks published in Europe between 1501 and 1550, Knolles' history was the first chronicle of the military and political aspects of the Ottoman Empire to be written in English. Previous histories had been available only in Latin and were thus not widely circulated.

Knolles also published a composite translation of Jean Bodin's Les Six livres de la République in 1606, under the title The Six Bookes of a Commonweale. It is based on both the French and Latin versions of Bodin's text and was dedicated to Sir Peter Manwood.

He completed a translation from the Latin of William Camden's Britannia, which was said to be "much estemed" by Camden, but was never published. The manuscript survives in the Bodleian Library, Oxford.

=== The Generall Historie of the Turkes ===
Dates of editions

- 1603 – original edition
- 1610
- 1621 – includes continuation by Edward Grimeston
- 1631 – includes continuation by Sir Thomas Roe, English Ambassador in Constantinople
- 1638
- 1687
- 1700 – Sir Paul Rycaut edition
- 1701 – two-volume abridged edition by John Savage

== Reputation ==
Knolles' work had considerable merits of style and of arrangement. Samuel Johnson praised him as the best of English historians, saying that "in his history of the Turks [Knolles] has displayed all the excellencies that narration can admit." Johnson explained Knolles' limited reputation by pointing out that his history recounted "enterprizes and revolutions, of which none desire to be informed".
