= Thomas Middleton =

English playwright and poet (1580–1627)

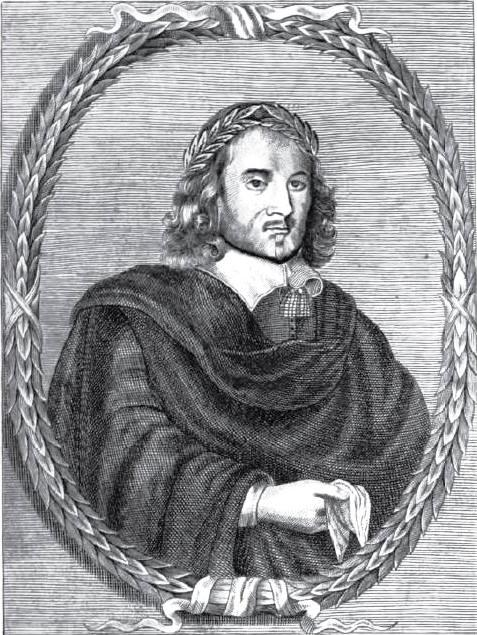
- Born: April 1580; London, England
- Died: July 1627 (aged 47); Southwark, England
- Education: The Queen's College, Oxford
- Occupations: Playwright, poet

Thomas Middleton (baptised 18 April 1580 – July 1627; also spelt Midleton) was an English Jacobean playwright and poet. He, with John Fletcher and Ben Jonson, was among the most successful and prolific of playwrights at work in the Jacobean period, and among the few to gain equal success in comedy and tragedy. He was also a prolific writer of masques and pageants.

== Life ==
Middleton was born in London and baptised on 18 April 1580. He was the son of a bricklayer, who had raised himself to the status of a gentleman and owned property adjoining the Curtain Theatre in Shoreditch. Middleton was five when his father died and his mother's subsequent remarriage dissolved into a 15-year battle over the inheritance of Thomas and his younger sister – an experience that informed him about the legal system and may have incited his repeated satire against the legal profession.

Middleton attended The Queen's College, Oxford, matriculating in 1598, but he did not graduate. Before he left Oxford sometime in 1600 or 1601, he wrote and published three long poems in popular Elizabethan styles. None of them appears to have been especially successful, and one, Microcynicon: Six Snarling Satires, ran foul of an Anglican church ban on verse satire and was burned. Nevertheless, his literary career was launched.

In the early 17th century, Middleton made a living writing topical pamphlets, including one – Penniless Parliament of Threadbare Poets – that was reprinted several times and became the subject of a parliamentary inquiry. At the same time, records in the diary of Philip Henslowe show that Middleton was writing for the Admiral's Men. Unlike Shakespeare, Middleton remained a free agent, able to write for whichever company hired him. His early dramatic career was marked by controversy. His friendship with Thomas Dekker brought him into conflict with Ben Jonson and George Chapman in the War of the Theatres. The grudge against Jonson continued as late as 1626, when Jonson's play The Staple of News indulges in a slur on Middleton's great success, A Game at Chess. It has been argued that Middleton's Inner Temple Masque (1619) sneers at Jonson (then absent in Scotland) as a "silenced bricklayer".

In 1603, Middleton married. In the same year an outbreak of the plague forced the London theatres to close, while James I came to the English throne. These events marked the beginning of Middleton's greatest period as a playwright. Having passed the time during the plague composing prose pamphlets (including a continuation of Thomas Nashe's Pierce Penniless), he returned to drama with great energy, producing almost a score of plays for several companies and in several genres, notably city comedy and revenge tragedy. He continued to collaborate with Dekker: the two produced The Roaring Girl, a biography of the contemporary thief Mary Frith.

In the 1610s, Middleton began a fruitful collaboration with the actor William Rowley, producing Wit at Several Weapons and A Fair Quarrel. Working alone in 1613, Middleton produced a comic masterpiece: A Chaste Maid in Cheapside. He also became increasingly involved with civic pageants, and in 1620 became officially appointed as chronologist to the City of London, a post he held until his death in 1627, when it passed to Jonson.

Such official duties did not interrupt Middleton's dramatic writing; the 1620s saw the production of his and Rowley's tragedy The Changeling, and of several tragicomedies. In 1624, he reached a peak of notoriety when his dramatic allegory A Game at Chess was staged by the King's Men. The play used the conceit of a chess game to present and satirise the recent intrigues surrounding the Spanish Match. Though Middleton's approach was strongly patriotic, the Privy Council silenced the play after nine performances, having received a complaint from the Spanish Ambassador. Middleton faced an unknown, probably frightening degree of punishment. Since no play later than A Game at Chess is recorded, it has been suggested that the sentence included a ban on writing for the stage.

== Death ==
Middleton died at his home at Newington Butts in Southwark in 1627, and was buried on 4 July in St Mary's churchyard. The old church of St Mary's was demolished in 1876 for road-widening. Its replacement elsewhere in Kennington Park Road was destroyed in the Second World War, but rebuilt in 1958. The old churchyard where Middleton was buried survives as a public park in Elephant and Castle.

== Reputation ==
Middleton's work has long been praised by literary critics, among them Algernon Charles Swinburne and T. S. Eliot. Eliot thought Middleton was second only to Shakespeare.

Middleton's plays were staged throughout the 20th century and into the 21st, each decade offering more productions than the last. Even some less familiar works of his have been staged: A Fair Quarrel at the National Theatre, and The Old Law by the Royal Shakespeare Company. The Changeling has been adapted for film several times. The tragedy Women Beware Women remains a stage favourite. The Revenger's Tragedy was adapted for Alex Cox's film Revengers Tragedy, the opening credits of which attribute the play's authorship to Middleton.

== Works ==
Middleton wrote in many genres, including tragedy, history and city comedy. His best-known plays are the tragedies The Changeling (with William Rowley) and Women Beware Women, and the cynically satirical city comedy A Chaste Maid in Cheapside. Earlier editions of The Revenger's Tragedy attributed the play to Cyril Tourneur, or refused to arbitrate between Middleton and Tourneur. However, since the statistical studies by David Lake and MacDonald P. Jackson, Middleton's authorship has not been seriously contested, and no further scholar has defended the Tourneur attribution. The Oxford Middleton and its companion piece, Thomas Middleton and Early Modern Textual Culture, offer extensive evidence both for Middleton's authorship of The Revenger's Tragedy, for his collaboration with Shakespeare on Timon of Athens, and for his adaptation and revision of Shakespeare's Macbeth and Measure for Measure. It has also been argued that Middleton collaborated with Shakespeare on All's Well That Ends Well.

Middleton's work is diverse even by the standards of his age. He did not have the kind of official relationship with a particular company that Shakespeare or Fletcher had. Instead he appears to have written on a freelance basis for any number of companies. His output ranges from the "snarling" satire of Michaelmas Term (performed by the Children of Paul's) to the bleak intrigues of The Revenger's Tragedy (performed by the King's Men). His early work was informed by the flourishing of satire in the late Elizabethan period, while his maturity was influenced by the ascendancy of Fletcherian tragicomedy. His later work, in which his satirical fury is tempered and broadened, includes three of his acknowledged masterpieces. A Chaste Maid in Cheapside, produced by the Lady Elizabeth's Men, skilfully combines London life with an expansive view of the power of love to effect reconciliation. The Changeling, a late tragedy, returns Middleton to an Italianate setting like that of The Revenger's Tragedy, except that here the central characters are more fully drawn and more compelling as individuals. Similar development can be seen in Women Beware Women.

Middleton's plays are marked by often amusingly presented cynicism about the human race. True heroes are a rarity: almost every character is selfish, greedy and self-absorbed. A Chaste Maid in Cheapside offers a panoramic view of a London populated entirely by sinners, in which no social rank goes unsatirised. In the tragedies Women Beware Women and The Revenger's Tragedy, amoral Italian courtiers endlessly plot against each other, resulting in a climactic bloodbath. When Middleton does portray good people, the characters have small roles and are shown as flawless.

Author Herbert Jack Heller suggests that Middleton's Calvinistic beliefs are indicated in his biblical commentary pamphlet, "The Two Gates of Salvation" (1607).

== List of works ==
=== Plays ===
- The Phoenix (1603–1604)
- The Honest Whore, Part 1 (1604) (co-written with Thomas Dekker)
- Michaelmas Term (1604)
- A Trick to Catch the Old One (1605)
- A Mad World, My Masters (1605)
- A Yorkshire Tragedy (1605)
- Timon of Athens (1606) (co-written with William Shakespeare)
- The Puritan (1606)
- Your Five Gallants (1607)
- The Bloody Banquet (1608–1609) (co-written with Dekker)
- The Roaring Girl (1611) (co-written with Dekker)
- No Wit, No Help Like a Woman's (1611)
- The Second Maiden's Tragedy (1611)
- A Chaste Maid in Cheapside (1613)
- Wit at Several Weapons (1613) (co-written with William Rowley)
- More Dissemblers Besides Women (1614)
- The Widow (1615–16)
- The Witch (1616)
- A Fair Quarrel (1616) (co-written with Rowley)
- The Old Law (1618–19) (co-written with Rowley)
- Hengist, King of Kent (1620)
- Women Beware Women (1621)
- Anything for a Quiet Life (1621) (co-written with John Webster)
- The Changeling (1622) (co-written with Rowley)
- The Nice Valour (1622)
- The Spanish Gypsy (1623) (co-written with Rowley, Dekker and John Ford)
- A Game at Chess (1624)

=== Attributed to Middleton, authorship disputed, possible co-authorship ===
- Blurt, Master Constable (1602) (usually attributed to either Middleton or Thomas Dekker)
- Measure for Measure (1603–4) (some scholars argue that the First Folio text was partly revised by Middleton in 1621)
- All's Well That Ends Well (1604-5) (believed by some scholars to be co-written or revised by Middleton, based on stylometric analysis)
- Macbeth (1606) (scholars have recognized evidence of late interpolations written by Middleton)
- The Revenger's Tragedy (1606) (Published anonymously, contemporary scholarly opinion generally ascribes the play to Middleton, revising a seventeenth-century attribution to Cyril Tourneur)
- The Family of Love (1608) (many scholars have attributed it to Middleton and Dekker; recent scholarship suggests that it was probably penned by Lording Barry)
- The Witch of Edmonton (1621) (title-page indicates an additional writer that could be Middleton)
- A Match at Midnight (1622) (some nineteenth-century critics ascribed it to Middleton and Rowley)

=== Other stage works ===
- The Whole Royal and Magnificent Entertainment Given to King James Through the City of London (1603–4) (co-written with Thomas Dekker, Stephen Harrison and Ben Jonson)
- The Manner of his Lordship's Entertainment
- The Triumphs of Truth (1613)
- The Lord Mayor's Masque or The Masque of Cupids (1614).
- Civitatis Amor. The Cities Loue. An Entertainement by Water, at Chelsey, and White-hall. (1616)
- The Triumphs of Honour and Industry (1617)
- The Masque of Heroes, or, The Inner Temple Masque (1619)
- The Triumphs of Love and Antiquity (1619)
- The World Tossed at Tennis (1620) (co-written with William Rowley)
- Honourable Entertainments (1620–1621)
- An Invention (1622)
- The Sun in Aries (1621)
- The Triumphs of Honour and Virtue (1622)
- The Triumphs of Integrity with The Triumphs of the Golden Fleece (1623)
- The Triumphs of Health and Prosperity (1626)

=== Poetry ===
- The Wisdom of Solomon Paraphrased (1597)
- Microcynicon: Six Snarling Satires (1599)
- The Ghost of Lucrece (1600)
- Burbage epitaph (1619)
- Bolles epitaph (1621)
- St. James (1623)
- Duchess of Malfi (Commendatory verses to John Webster's play) (1623)
- To the King (1624)

=== Prose ===
- The Penniless Parliament of Threadbare Poets (1601)
- News from Gravesend (1603) (co-written with Thomas Dekker)
- The Nightingale and the Ant (1604) (also published as Father Hubbard's Tales)
- The Meeting of Gallants at an Ordinary (1604) (co-written with Dekker)
- Plato's Cap Cast at the Year 1604 (1604)
- The Black Book (1604)
- Sir Robert Sherley his Entertainment in Cracovia (1609) (translation).
- The Two Gates of Salvation, or The Marriage of the Old and New Testament (1609)
- The Owl's Almanac (1618)
- The Peacemaker (1618)
