= The Changeling (play) =

Play by Middleton and Rowley, published 1652

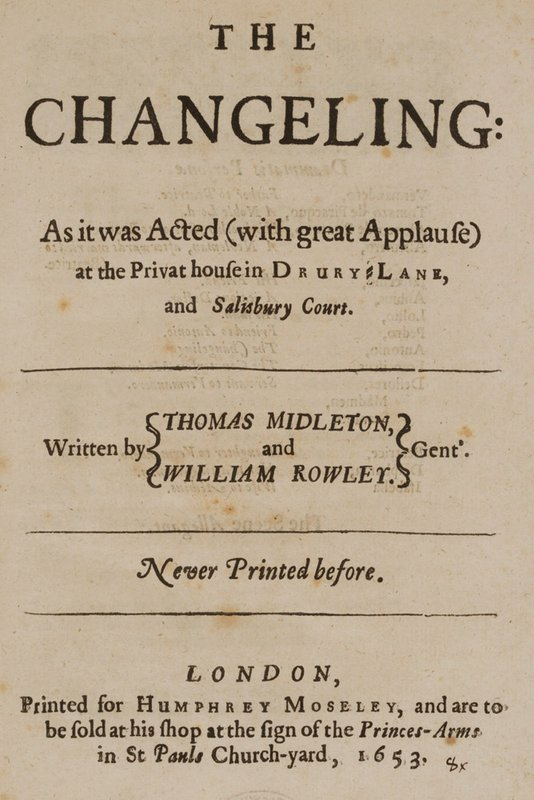
- Title page of 1653 publication
- Original language: Early Modern English
- Written by: Thomas Middleton and William Rowley
- Characters: Vermandero; Beatrice-Joanna; Diaphanta; Tomazo de Piracquo; Alonzo de Piracquo; Alsemero; Jasperino; De Flores; Alibius; Lollio; Isabella; Franciscus; Antonio; Pedro
- Subject: treachery, sin
- Genre: tragedy
- Setting: 17th century: Alicante and a madhouse nearby

Premiere
- Date: 1622
- Place: London, England

The Changeling is a Jacobean tragedy written by Thomas Middleton and William Rowley. Widely regarded as being among the best tragedies of the English Renaissance, the play has accumulated a large amount of critical commentary.

The play was licensed for performance by Sir Henry Herbert, the Master of the Revels, on 7 May 1622, and was first published in 1652 by the bookseller Humphrey Moseley.

== Authorship ==
The title page of the first edition of The Changeling attributes the play to Middleton and Rowley. The division of authorship between the two writers was first delineated by Pauline Wiggin in 1897, and is widely accepted. David Lake, in his survey of authorship problems in the Middleton canon, summarises the standard division of shares this way:

Middleton – Act II; Act III, scenes i, ii, and iv; Act IV, scenes i and ii; Act V, scenes i and ii;
Rowley – Act I; Act III, scene iii; Act IV, scene iii; Act V, scene iii.

Lake differs from previous commentators only in assigning the first seventeen lines of IV, ii to Rowley. The essential point of the dichotomy is that Rowley wrote the subplot and the opening and closing scenes, while Middleton was primarily responsible for the main plot—a division of labour that is unsurprising, given the examples of other Middleton–Rowley collaborations. The main plot itself derives from a 1621 story collection by John Reynolds.

== Themes and Motifs ==
The theme is the treachery that comes as a consequence of sinful human nature. The play expresses this theme through the reference of "original sin" and its consequential "fall". Subsequently, moral purity is restored after the motives of the main character are revealed. The motif of faulty eyesight is used to express the theme "blindness shuts out the consequences of impulsive acts, and with, what amounts to an idée fixe, the chief characters then seek to impose their wills on an unbending and indifferent world, victimizing those equally as blind".

== Characters ==
Alicante

- Vermandero, governor of the castle of Alicante, father to Beatrice
- Beatrice-Joanna, daughter to Vermandero
- Diaphanta, her waiting-woman
- Tomazo de Piracquo, a noble lord
- Alonzo de Piracquo, Tomazo's brother, suitor to Beatrice
- Alsemero, a nobleman, suitor to Beatrice
- Jasperino, Alsemero's friend
- De Flores, servant to Vermandero

Asylum

- Alibius, a jealous doctor
- Lollio, Alibius' waiting man
- Isabella, wife to Alibius
- Franciscus, the counterfeit madman
- Antonio, the counterfeit fool
- Pedro, Antonio's friend

== Synopsis ==
There are two parallel plots. The main plot in Alicante ("Alligant") focuses on Beatrice-Joanna; Alonzo, to whom she is betrothed; and Alsemero, whom she loves. To rid herself of Alonzo, Beatrice makes De Flores (who secretly loves her) murder him. This, predictably, has a tragic outcome. The sub-plot in the madhouse involves Alibius and his young wife Isabella. Franciscus and Antonio are in love with her and pretend to be a madman and a fool, respectively, to see her. Lollio also wants her. This ends comically.

=== Act I, scene i ===
Outside a church
Alsemero enters from church and tells us of his love for a woman he met there. Jasperino enters from the harbour, reminding Alsemero that the "wind's fair" and that they should leave for Malta. Alsemero tells him that he is not ready to go yet. Alsemero does not give any reason to Jasperino but tells him that he wants to stay back. In truth, he wants to try to stay close to Beatrice. Beatrice enters with Diaphanta and Alsemero greets her. Alsemero had a reputation as asexual, thus Jasperino is surprised to learn that Alsemero has fallen in love with Beatrice. Jasperino watches and makes comments as Beatrice and Alsemero flirt. Alsemero proposes to Beatrice, but, in an aside, she regrets that five days ago she was promised in marriage to Alonzo de Piracquo. Her father (Vermandero) had arranged this marriage for her, although Beatrice is not at all interested in Alonzo. Instead, Beatrice is much taken by Alsemero. Alsemero waits for an answer. Jasperino resolves to get a girl for himself and sees Diaphanta.

Then, De Flores enters to inform Beatrice of her father's imminent arrival. Beatrice is always repulsed by De Flores (one of the reasons being that De Flores is physically ugly) and treats him badly. However, as De Flores is besotted with Beatrice, he suffers the abuses she heaps on him just to hear her voice and see her. Beatrice tells him to go away (not only because she dislikes De Flores but also because De Flores disrupts her meeting with Alsemero); he backs off, but still watches her. Jasperino and Diaphanta begin having a conversation full of sexual innuendos. Vermandero joins Beatrice, causing her to change her behaviour. She introduces him to Alsemero; knowing the young man's father, Vermandero invites him in to see their castle. Vermandero also talks of Beatrice's fiancé, causing her to say goodbye to Alsemero in preparation for her return home. Alsemero is heartbroken hearing talk of Beatrice's fiancé; he plans to leave, but Vermandero insists that he stay. As they leave, Beatrice drops her glove. De Flores picks it up and offers it to her but she will not take it as she is disgusted. Beatrice exits and De Flores closes the scene with a soliloquy.

=== Act I, scene ii ===
Alibius's madhouse

Alibius starts to tell Lollio a secret. The old man says he cannot satisfy his wife sexually and fears she will be disloyal to him. Therefore, he asks Lollio to guard her and lock her up. Lollio agrees, knowing that he could be left alone with Isabella and may have a chance to have sex with her. Lollio goes on to analyse the two kinds of patients in the mental asylum—fools (people who were born with mental deficiencies) and madmen (people who suffer a degradation of mental health during the course of their lives). He says that Alibius need not fear that Isabella will have sex with fools or madmen. Alibius says he is more concerned with sane tourists who come to view the patients.

Antonio and Pedro enter. Pedro gives Alibius a large sum of money to take care of Antonio. Lollio hints that he wants some too and Pedro grants him his wish. Lollio says that Antonio has almost the appearance of a gentleman and he wouldn't have been able to tell Antonio was a fool. Then Pedro asks for Lollio to educate and improve the mind of Antonio (who also goes by "Tony," a nickname associated in the Renaissance with madness). Lollio replies that he will "make him as wise as myself." Pedro leaves, and Alibius counts the money. Lollio threatens to whip Antonio, also questioning him with short riddles. Surprisingly, Antonio provides very shrewd answers, which leads Lollio to remark that Antonio is very smart for a fool. The madmen (who are imprisoned in a different enclosure from the fools) begin shouting for food, and Alibius leaves to attend to them. Meanwhile, Lollio takes Antonio to the cells for fools.

=== Act II, scene i ===
A chamber in the castle

Beatrice gives Jasperino a note for Alsemero in secret. In her soliloquy, Beatrice talks of how great Alsemero is (because she thinks that among other things Alsemero has shown sound judgement in choosing someone like Jasperino as his companion) and then how horrible Alonzo de Piracquo is. She says the only reason that she is marrying Alonzo is because her father has forced the choice on her and she cannot disobey her father.

De Flores enters (having eavesdropped on Beatrice's proclamations of love for Alsemero) but Beatrice does not see him initially while he talks of Alonzo's love for her and her hatred of him. She sees him and gets angry because he stalls from delivering his message. Eventually he says that Alonzo and Tomazo have arrived. After delivering another soliloquy, he exits. Beatrice, repelled by De Flores, says she will get her father to dismiss him.

Then Vermandero, Alonzo and Tomazo enter. Vermandero attempts to be a welcoming host. While Beatrice and Vermandero talk, Tomazo tells his brother that Beatrice did not seem pleased to see him. Alonzo dismisses the remark. After Vermandero informs Alonzo that Beatrice has requested a three-day postponement of their wedding, Tomazo repeats his misgivings. He tells Alonzo not to marry Beatrice because she is in love with someone else. Alonzo refuses to listen, being madly in love and finding no faults in Beatrice. He says he does not think that she was behaving coldly with him.

=== Act II, scene ii ===
Another chamber in the castle

Diaphanta leads Alsemero into a chamber secretly. She is acting on her lady's (Beatrice's) instructions. However, Diaphanta too is smitten with Alsemero. When Beatrice enters, she leaves the room unwillingly as she was enjoying being alone with Alsemero. Alsemero and Beatrice talk and embrace. They talk about how they could "remove the cause" by killing Alonzo. Alsemero declares he will challenge Piraquo to a duel (meaning Alsemero would end up dead or in jail.) Beatrice protests saying that that wouldn't actually help in uniting them but would rather further separate them physically. Beatrice, on an aside, realises that she can use De Flores to kill Alonzo. Beatrice shoves Alsemero back to Diaphanta (who is overjoyed).

De Flores enters, having been hidden. De Flores realises that Beatrice will have to transgress one bond (with Alonzo) if she is to have sex with Alsemero. This acts as a kind of impetus to De Flores who thinks if she breaks a bond once, she may break it several times and even he himself might have a chance to have sex with her. Beatrice decides to flirt with him. She behaves not only civilly but also amorously with him. She promises him some medicine that will cure his bad skin. He is delighted at her apparent change of heart. She tells him she is being forced to marry a man she hates, and De Flores realises she wants him to murder Alonzo. In return, she gives him some money, and says a greater reward (by which she means more money but which De Flores assumes as an offer for sex) awaits him if he successfully completes the task. De Flores kneels before her (he is also a gentleman) and agrees readily to commit the murder, thinking he'll be able to sleep with her afterwards. Beatrice says she expects him to leave the country after the murder; she is pleased that she can get rid of De Flores and Alonzo at the same time. Beatrice exits.

Alonzo enters. Alonzo asks De Flores for a tour of the castle. De Flores says he will show him around after dinner. He hides a sword in his cloak.

=== Act III, scene i ===
A narrow passage / A vault

As they descend, De Flores advises that the space is very narrow so Alonzo should find it easier to walk if he leaves his sword behind.

=== Act III, scene ii ===
De Flores instructs Alonzo to look out a window. While he is doing this, De Flores stabs him three times. De Flores sees a diamond ring on the finger of the dead Alonzo. He tries to remove the diamond ring and take it for himself but he is somehow unable to remove the ring from the dead Alonzo's finger. He instead cuts off the entire finger and takes it with him. Then he clears away the body.

=== Act III, scene iii ===
Alibius' madhouse

Isabella asks Lollio why she has been locked up. Lollio claims it's his master's wish so that Isabella isn't able to venture out and be sexually active with other men. Isabella complains that there are only madmen and fools in the mental asylum. Then she says that she recently saw that a very good-looking patient was admitted and requests Lollio to bring the patient to her. Lollio shows in Franciscus. Isabella asks Lollio how Franciscus went mad. Lollio replies that it was because of spurned love. Isabella remarks that Franciscus seems like a gentleman by the way he speaks. Lollio whips Franciscus for insulting him and for making advances towards Isabella. They soon realise that Franciscus is not really a madman but only pretending to be one, and Lollio puts Franciscus back in his cell.

Lollio brings Antonio to meet Isabella. The madmen make noises, and Lollio goes to beat them. As he leaves, Antonio reveals to Isabella that he is only pretending to be a fool so as to be admitted into the asylum and gain access to her. Antonio tries to undress himself and have sex with Isabella but she is able to avoid it for the time being. Lollio returns to ask Antonio some questions, but leaves again as the madmen start creating a ruckus and Lollio has to manage both cells. After he leaves, Antonio begins kissing Isabella, not knowing Lollio is spying on them. Suddenly madmen dressed as birds interrupt their encounter. Lollio again goes offstage to attend to them. He comes back to return Antonio to his cell. Isabella remarks that one need not go out of the house to seek sexual escapades. Lollio then challenges Isabella about Antonio and tries to sexually molest Isabella in return for keeping it a secret. Alibius enters, oblivious to the conversation, and tells them that Vermandero has invited him to make his patients perform (simply as madmen) at Beatrice's wedding.

=== Act III, scene iv ===
A chamber in the castle

Vermandero, Beatrice, Jasperino, and Alsemero enter; only Vermandero does not know about Beatrice and Alsemero. They all leave to look around the castle, except Beatrice. Beatrice says that she's starting to convince her father to like Alsemero. De Flores enters with the intention of having sex with Beatrice, thinking this is what she wants too. He tells Beatrice that "Piracquo is no more" and then shows her the finger with the diamond ring. Beatrice says it was the first token that Vermandero made her send to Alonzo. Beatrice asks De Flores to take the ring as it is worth three hundred ducats, then on seeing the fact that De Flores is disappointed, offers another three thousand florins. De Flores is disgusted at the idea of murdering for money; he murdered for the reward of having sex with Beatrice. Beatrice offers to double the amount, but is confused about why De Flores will not leave contented with money, assuming that the amount he wants is much too high to actually announce out loud. She thus suggests he goes out of the country (as she had told him earlier) and send her the amount he wants on paper. He replies that if he leaves, she must too, since they are bound together in guilt. De Flores kisses her in a last-ditch attempt to seal their love, but Beatrice rejects him with disgust. De Flores explains in meticulous detail exactly why she has to submit to him, mainly that he can now effectively blackmail her or else he will inform everyone how she hired him to murder Alonzo. He says that his life is worth nothing if he cannot have her, and therefore is willing to incriminate himself if she does not sleep with him. She tries to impress on him the difference in their social class, but he claims that her evil act has made them equals. She makes one last effort to offer him all her gold, but again he refuses. She eventually realises the vicious cycle of sin that she has entered.

=== Act IV, scene i ===
Dumb Show

Various gentlemen enter, Vermandero meeting them, wondering over the plight of Alonzo. Alsemero, Jasperino and the Gallants enter. Vermandero points to the Gallants, the gentlemen seeming to applaud the choice. Beatrice, in her wedding dress, enters. She is accompanied with Diaphanta, Isabella, and other women.

De Flores enters last, smiling at the "accident"; Alonzo's ghost appears to De Flores in the midst of his smile, startling him, and shows him the hand whose finger he had cut off.

Beatrice has yielded to De Flores's sexual demands, and has also married Alsemero. Alone in the afternoon in Alsemero's room, she feels too ashamed to have sex with her new husband on their wedding night. In Alsemero's closet, she finds many medicines. One is a pregnancy test kit and another a virginity test kit. Diaphanta enters, looking for Alsemero. Beatrice tells Diaphanta that she will offer 1000 ducats to any virgin if she secretly has sex with her husband Alsemero, instead of her, on their wedding night. But to test whether Diaphanta is a virgin or not, both of them take the virginity test. The virginity test shows that Beatrice is not a virgin whereas Diaphanta is, as she has exhibited the usual symptoms of first yawning, then sneezing, and finally laughing. They arrange for Diaphanta to go to Alsemero's bed that night, in the pitch darkness, and pretend to be Beatrice.

=== Act IV, scene ii ===
Vermandero finds that two of his gentlemen, Antonio and Franciscus, have left the castle. He issues arrest warrants for them, believing they have murdered Alonzo and fled. Tomazo enters, accusing Vermandero of killing his brother. Vermandero pretends that Alonzo has just run away and it is he, Vermandero, who should actually be offended that his future son-in-law has run away at the last moment. Vermandero says Tomazo should leave too, as he is the brother of an ignoble coward like Alonzo. Vermandero exits.

De Flores enters, and Tomazo greets him warmly, remembering that his brother Alonzo was fond of De Flores. Tomazo even goes on to say that whereas Vermandero is not trustworthy, De Flores is a trustworthy gentleman. All this talk reminds De Flores of Tomazo's brother Alonzo whom he killed. De Flores exits. Alsemero enters and Tomazo is hostile towards him. Tomazo challenges Alsemero to a duel after the wedding. Tomazo exits, Jasperino runs in. Jasperino tells Alsemero that he heard Beatrice and De Flores having a conversation similar to one lovers might have. Alsemero instructs Jasperino to go and get the virginity test. Beatrice enters just before Jasperino returns. Alsemero thinks Beatrice looks very different and must have been abused. Alsemero gives Beatrice the potion, and she drinks it, then fakes the symptoms thereby "proving" to Alsemero and Jasperino that she is a virgin.

=== Act IV, scene iii ===
Lollio and Isabella read a letter in which Franciscus declares that he is only pretending to be a madman to gain access to Isabella and that he is in love with her. Lollio says that if Isabella has sex with Franciscus, then he wants to have sex with her too. Isabella says that if she indeed does commit adultery, she will sleep with him, implying that she has no intention of committing adultery. She asks Lollio how to deal with Antonio and Franciscus's attraction to her, and he advises her to abuse them. To that end, she leaves to dress as a madwoman.

Alibius arrives and asks about the wedding. Alibius then asks how Isabella is getting on. Lollio assures him she is fine and he exits. Antonio enters, and Lollio forces him to dance. Lollio exits, and Isabella enters in her new clothes as a madwoman. Isabella attempts to kiss him but Antonio resists, unable to recognise Isabella and disgusted at the idea of being kissed by a madwoman. Antonio confesses that he is no fool but just a gentleman pretending to be a fool. Isabella denounces him for loving her external appearance only. She exits, and Lollio enters, telling Antonio that if he kills Franciscus, he can have sex with Isabella. Franciscus enters, and Lollio reads the letter he wrote to Isabella. Lollio tells him that if he kills Antonio, Isabella will have sex with him. Alibius enters, and Lollio goes to fetch the madmen. All the madmen dance for the wedding.

=== Act V, scene i ===
It is 2 a.m. and Diaphanta has not yet come out of Alsemero's chamber, even though Beatrice had instructed her to finish by midnight. Therefore, Beatrice suspects that Diaphanta is actually enjoying having sex with Alsemero. This leads her to suspect that it must have been Diaphanta who had informed Alsemero of Beatrice's loss of virginity (as Diaphanta may have had a chance to figure out that what she and Beatrice indulged in were virginity tests). This leads to Beatrice getting very angry with Diaphanta. De Flores enters. Beatrice is worried that if Diaphanta does not come out before daybreak, Alsemero will be able to see with whom he has had sex with and will recognise his mistake and Beatrice's plot will be ruined. De Flores comes up with an idea to get Diaphanta out of the room. He says that he will set Diaphanta's chambers on fire and that will wake up the entire house and when Diaphanta returns to her room then De Flores will pretend that he will clean the chimney with a gun but he will kill her with it. Beatrice agrees, even suggesting that she now loves De Flores. Alonzo's ghost appears again and haunts De Flores and Beatrice. De Flores lights the fire, offstage, then leads the group of residents who attempt to douse it. Diaphanta appears, and Beatrice tells her to return to her chamber. Vermandero enters, followed by Alsemero and Jasperino. The gunshot is heard, signifying Diaphanta's murder. De Flores returns to the stage, heroically carrying Diaphanta's burnt body from the fire. De Flores is promised financial reward by Vermandero and others for his bravery in alerting everyone to the fire and thereby preventing further damage.

=== Act V, scene ii ===
Tomazo, in a sudden fit of misanthropy, decides to blame the next person he sees for the death of his brother (since he holds everyone potentially accountable). De Flores enters. Tomazo becomes enraged. He reiterates Beatrice's earlier misgivings about using something that has also been used by De Flores. He says that if his sword were to touch De Flores once, he would not use that sword again, and strikes him. De Flores draws his sword as though to retaliate, but is forcibly reminded of Alonzo's murder, and cannot bring himself to strike. De Flores is unnerved by Tomazo's sudden, intuitive hostility, and leaves hastily. Alibius and Isabella enter with Vermandero. Tomazo tells them to go away. Vermandero informs Tomazo that he has found Alonzo's murderers—Antonio and Franciscus, who were hiding in a mental asylum after committing the murder.

=== Act V, scene iii ===
Jasperino and Alsemero have seen Beatrice and De Flores together in a garden and are discussing it. Beatrice enters, Jasperino hides. Alsemero accuses Beatrice of being a liar and a whore, and suggests that she's been cheating with De Flores. She confesses that she employed De Flores to murder Alonzo, but explains that she did it out of love for Alsemero, because her first motive was to remove Alonzo so that she and Alsemero could be together. Alsemero says he must think about what to do, and locks Beatrice in a closet to wait. De Flores enters, and Alsemero gets him to admit to murder. De Flores, under the impression that Beatrice is attempting to betray and outmanoeuvre him, exposes her infidelity. Alsemero confines him in the closet with Beatrice. Vermandero, Alibius, Isabella, Tomazo, and Franciscus enter, thinking they have solved the case of Alonzo's murder. Alsemero also claims he has solved Alonzo's murder. As Alsemero begins to reveal the truth, screams of pleasure and of pain are heard within the room, and the pair comes out, Beatrice stabbed by De Flores. Beatrice confesses her fallen state and also that she sent Diaphanta in her place to the bedroom to have sex with Alsemero. De Flores admits to killing Alonzo, stabs himself, and dies before Tomazo can seek revenge. With his last words, De Flores instructs Beatrice to follow him in death, and as she dies, Beatrice asks Alsemero for forgiveness. They speak about changes and changelings. Alsemero says Beatrice was beauty changed to whoredom, he himself a supposed husband changed with wantonness. Antonio says he was changed from a little ass to a great fool and was almost changed to be hanged at the gallows. Franciscus says he was changed from a little wit to stark mad. Alibius says he realises his folly and will change himself and never keep fake patients.

=== Epilogue ===
The epilogue is a mere eight lines in which Alsemero explains that it is impossible to comfort people after they have lost a person close to them. The only solution is for that person to be replaced, the implication being that the audience must applaud for this "replacement" to occur.

== Film, television and stage adaptations ==
In 1974, as part of Play of the Month, the BBC broadcast a production directed by Anthony Page and starring Stanley Baker as De Flores, Helen Mirren as Beatrice-Joanna, Brian Cox as Alsemero, Tony Selby as Jasperino and Susan Penhaligon as Isabella. This is available on DVD in the Helen Mirren at the BBC box set.

In 1994, a version directed by Simon Curtis removed the madhouse subplot and was broadcast by the BBC starring Elizabeth McGovern as Beatrice-Joanna, Bob Hoskins as De Flores, Hugh Grant as Alsemero and Sean Pertwee as Tomazo. It was broadcast in the United States on the BRAVO cable television network.

A 1998 film version directed by Marcus Thompson starred Guy Williams as Alonso, Amanda Ray-King as Beatrice-Joanna, Ian Dury as De Flores and Colm O'Maonlai as Alsemero. Notable stage performances have included the English Stage Company's 1960 production with Mary Ure and Robert Shaw, directed by Tony Richardson, and the 1988 National Theatre production starring Miranda Richardson as Beatrice-Joanna and George Harris as De Flores.

A 2009 ITV television tragedy, Compulsion, is loosely based on The Changeling.

In 2012 the play returned for a new version at London's Young Vic theatre. The actors doubled up roles for the main and sub plot, such as Diaphanta and Isabella.

In 2014 Dominic Dromgoole directed the play in the Sam Wanamaker Playhouse at the Globe Theatre, recreating the performance with the sole use of candlelight for the performance.

In 2016 Jesse Berger directed the play Off-Broadway at Red Bull Theater, in a production which featured Manoel Felciano and Sara Topham. https://www.redbulltheater.com/the-changeling

Between 2016 and 2017 the play was mounted four times around the city of Toronto, first in a text adapted by Julian R. Munds, Changeling: A Grand Guignol for Murderous times (dir. Harrison Thomas); then by James Wallis, as The Changeling: A Staged Reading, for his production company Shakespeare BASH'd; then in association with the Stratford Festival of Canada and the School of Performance at Ryerson University, by Paul Yachnin, a professor of English at McGill University, for early modern Conversions; and finally by the Stratford Festival, as a full production at the Tom Patterson Theatre (dir. Jackie Maxwell), starring Mikaela Davies and Ben Carlson.

In 2019, a small-scale tour was mounted by Resurgens Theatre Company, an original practice company led by Dr. Brent Griffin in association with the Atlanta Shakespeare Tavern. The tour was designed for educational audiences and performed in Alabama, Georgia and Mississippi.

In 2020, during the UK COVID-19 lockdown, a Radio production of the play was created by the graduation year of the Guildford School of Acting. The class composed and recorded the Soundtrack themselves. The production was directed by Tam Williams, and Musical Direction and Sound Editing was overseen by Paul Herbert. More information, and the recording itself is available on https://www.thechangelinggsa.com/
