= A Shoemaker a Gentleman =

Stage play by William Rowley

A Shoemaker a Gentleman is a Jacobean era stage play, a comedy written by William Rowley. It may be Rowley's only extant solo comedy.

Nineteenth-century scholars and critics generally classified four plays as solo Rowley works – the tragedy All's Lost by Lust and the comedies A Shoemaker a Gentleman, A Match at Midnight, and A New Wonder, a Woman Never Vexed. Twentieth-century researchers have questioned Rowley's sole authorship of the latter two dramas.

== Publication ==
A Shoemaker a Gentleman was entered into the Stationers' Register on 28 November 1637, and first appeared in print in 1638, in a quarto printed and published by John Okes and sold by the stationer John Cooper (or Cowper). This 1638 quarto was the only edition of the play in the seventeenth century. Authorship is assigned to "W. R." on the title page.

== Date and performance ==
The date of the play is not known with certainty, and its early performance history is largely a blank. The title page of the 1638 quarto states that the work was "sundry times acted at the Red Bull and other theaters, with general and good applause." Okes' dedication of the play to the guild of shoemakers also mentions the play's popularity, and states that "some twenty years agone, it was in the fashion." This suggests a date c. 1618 for the play's origin, though the "twenty years" figure could be only an approximation. Commentators have suggested dates of authorship as early as c. 1608.

The comic subplot of the play was extracted and performed as a "droll," and was often staged at Bartholomew Fair and Southwark Fair during the middle and later decades of the seventeenth century. The play was revived at least once during the Restoration era.

== Sources and influences ==
Rowley drew upon several sources for the plot of his play, notably William Caxton's The Golden Legend and Thomas Deloney's The Gentle Craft. (Deloney's work also inspired Thomas Dekker's famous play The Shoemaker's Holiday.) Rowley depended on the Chronicles of Raphael Holinshed for his account of the early Christian martyr St. Alban ("Albon" in the play).

A Shoemaker a Gentleman shares a range of resemblances and common features with other plays of its era. Its general ambience is strongly similar to Dekker's Shoemaker's Holiday. Its setting in ancient Britain, and its plot device of the two British princes living humble lives in disguise and under assumed names, suggests Shakespeare's Cymbeline. The play also bears a significant inter-relationship with The Birth of Merlin, another play in the Rowley canon.

== Genre ==
A Shoemaker a Gentleman is securely in the tradition of the popular realistic comedy of its era. Additionally, its serious subplot shows the influence of the religious and hagiographic drama of the later Middle Ages. The saints' plays that characterized that era had largely passed out of fashion by Rowley's generation, though they could still exert some influence – Dekker and Massinger's The Virgin Martyr (1622) being the obvious example. Rowley includes a comparable religious subplot in The Birth of Merlin.

== Synopsis ==
The play is set in Roman Britain in the period around 300 CE, during the reign of Diocletian and Maximian. (The latter is called "Maximinus" in the play.) The opening scene shows the Roman army in battle with the fictitious British king Allured. Allured is killed in the fighting, and his Queen (otherwise unnamed) insists that her sons, Elred (or Eldred) and Offa, flee the field to avoid death or capture. The two princes reluctantly comply; the Queen is apprehended by the Romans. Her speeches to the two emperors reveal that she is a Christian.

Elred and Offa assume humble disguises, Elred calling himself Crispianus, and Offa, Crispinus or Crispin. They make for Faversham in Kent become apprentices for the (otherwise unnamed) Shoemaker and his wife. This couple and their other apprentices, Barnaby and Raphe, provide much of the play's overt comedy. The Shoemaker supplies footwear to the princess Leodice, the daughter of Maximinus; it is through this connection that Leodice meets, and quickly falls in love with, Offa/Crispin. Conversations between Leodice and her Nurse (who resembles the Nurse in Romeo and Juliet) reveal the princess's infatuation; they also specify that both Diocletian and Maximinus climbed to their present high stations from humble beginnings. Crispin's touching and measuring Leodice's feet provides risqué humor. Soon enough, Leodice reveals her feelings to Crispin, and the two enter into a secret marriage.

While Crispin is out with Leodice, a press gang from the Roman army comes to the Shoemaker's shop looking for new soldiers; Elred/Crispianus, motivated by his innate princely valor, is willingly drafted. The military action has shifted from Britain to northern Germany, where the Romans are fighting the Goths and Vandals. Crispianus fights bravely and distinguishes himself in combat. When Diocletian and the Romans' eagle insignia are captured by Huldrick, king of the Goths, Crispianus rescues the emperor and the eagle; he kills Huldrick and captures Roderick the Vandal king, making himself the great hero of the victory.

Among the Roman force is an officer called Albon. Under the influence of the Christian hermit Amphiabel, Albon converts to Christianity. The emperors discover his conversion, and capture and torture both Albon and Amphiabel. Both go to martyrdom true to their faith.

When the Roman army returns to Britain they are mistaken for an invading force; a public panic ensues. Leodice is by now expecting her first child with husband Crispin; amid a good deal of rushing about with the Nurse and hostile comments from the Shoemaker's wife, the princess gives birth. By the play's end, both Crispin and Crispianus are recognized as the royal princes they are. In light of Crispianus' military heroism and Crispin's marriage with Leodice, the emperors accept them as client kings, Offa/Crispin ruling the north of Britain and Elred/Crispianus ruling the south. Their mother the Queen is released from captivity; their Christianity, despite previous persecutions, is accepted.

The play's subplot relates the story of St. Winifred, though Rowley places it three centuries earlier than historical accuracy would dictate. Winifred is a young noblewoman pursued by suitors, most prominently a Welsh nobleman called Sir Hugh; but Winifed desires to follow her religious vocation in preference to marriage. Her choice is validated when an angel appears to her at St. Winifred's Well. Sir Hugh agrees to a three-month suspension of his suit; but even after that time, Winifred is determined to refuse him. Discouraged by the Britons' military defeat and his own rejection, Hugh abandons his high station to pursue a humble life; he too becomes an apprentice in the Shoemaker's shop. Eventually Winifred is apprehended by the Romans and martyred; Sir Hugh loyally remains by her side and joins her in martyrdom, dying apparently from grief. Sir Hugh's status as nobleman, shoemaker, and martyr earns the trade of shoemaking the honorific of "the gentle craft," and the shoemakers' tools are from then on known as "St. Hugh's bones."
