= 1705 in literature =

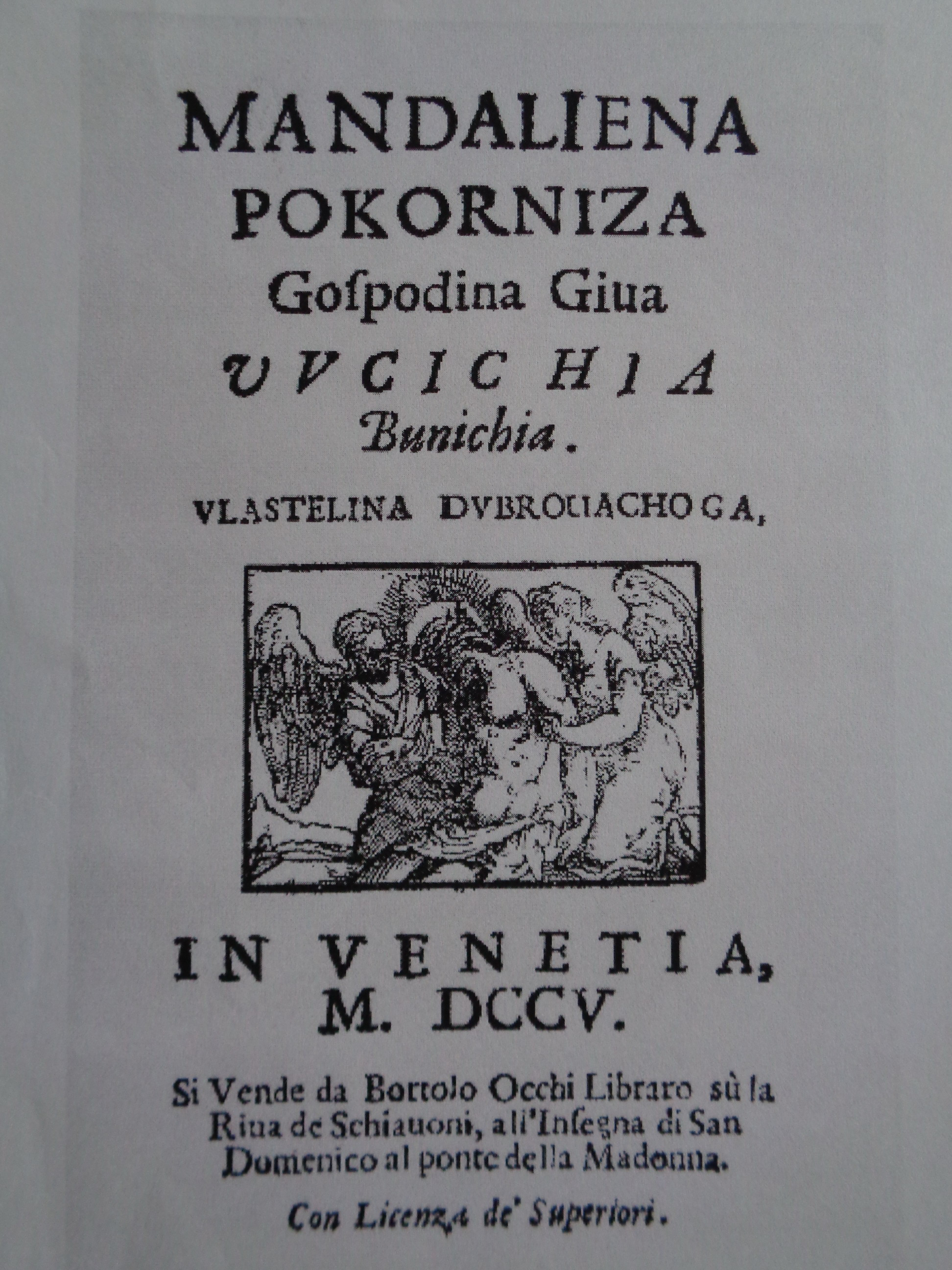
Ivan Bunić Vučić (Italian: Giovanni Serafino Bona), Croatian poet and politician from the Dubrovnik Republic: "Mandaliena pokorniza" - title page; published in Venice in 1705.

This article contains information about the literary events and publications of 1705.

== Events ==
- April/May – Richard Steele, having left the army, marries a wealthy widow, Margaret Stretch.
- July 29 – Richard Challoner enters the English College, Douai.
- October 7 – William Somervile inherits his father's estate, where field sports will inspire much of his poetry.
- October 30 – John Vanbrugh's play The Confederacy, adapted from the French, is first performed at his new London playhouse, The Queen's Theatre in the Haymarket.
- December 27 – John Vanbrugh's play The Mistake is likewise adapted from the French and first performed at The Queen's Theatre.
- unknown dates
  - George Hickes' Linguarum veterum septentrionalium thesaurus grammatico-criticus et archæologicus vol. 2 (published in Oxford) includes the first published reference to Beowulf and the single surviving transcript of the Finnesburg Fragment.
  - Chikamatsu Monzaemon (近松門左衛門) almost abandons writing kabuki plays and becomes a staff writer to the bunraku theatre in Osaka.
  - Claude Pierre Goujet, religious historian and Jansenist, enters holy orders.
  - William Walsh begins a correspondence with Alexander Pope.
  - Work begins on Blenheim Palace in Oxfordshire, England, designed by the playwright John Vanbrugh for the Duke of Marlborough.

== New books ==
=== Prose ===
- Joseph Addison – Remarks on Several Parts of Italy
- Mary Astell – The Christian Religion as Profess'd by a Daughter of the Church
- Dimitrie Cantemir – Historia Hieroglyphica (the first novel to use the Romanian language)
- George Cheyne – Philosophical Principles of Natural Religion (deist)
- Samuel Clarke – A Demonstration of the Being and Attributes of God
- Mary Davys – The Fugitive
- Daniel Defoe
  - The Consolidator; or, Memoirs of Sundry Transactions from the World in the Moon
  - A Second Volume of the Writings of the Author of the True-Born Englishman
- John Dunton – The Life and Errors of John Dunton Late Citizen of London (humor)
- Edmund Gibson – Family-Devotion
- Charles Gildon – The Deist's Manual
- Marie-Jeanne L'Héritier – La Tour ténébreuse, et les jours lumineux: contes anglois
- Bernard de Mandeville – The Grumbling Hive (pirated edition)
- Delarivière Manley – The Secret History, of Queen Zarah, and the Zarazians (roman à clef)
- John Philips
  - Blenheim
  - The Splendid Shilling
- Katherine Philips – Letters of Orinda to Poliarchus
- John Toland – Primitive Constitution of the Christian Church

=== Drama ===
- Thomas Baker – Hampstead Heath
- Susannah Centlivre
  - The Gamester (anonymously)
  - The Basset-Table
- Colley Cibber – The Careless Husband
- Prosper Jolyot de Crébillon – Idoménée
- John Dennis – Gibraltar, or the Spanish Adventure
- George Granville – The British Enchanters
- William Grimston, 1st Viscount Grimston – The Lawyer’s Fortune or Love in a Hollow Tree
- Peter Anthony Motteux
  - The Amorous Miser, or the Younger the Wiser
  - Arsinoe, Queen of Cyprus (opera)
- William Mountfort – Zelmane
- Mary Pix (attributed) – The Conquest of Spain (adapted from William Rowley's All's Lost by Lust)
- Nicholas Rowe – Ulysses
- Richard Steele – The Tender Husband
- John Vanbrugh –
  - The Confederacy
  - The Mistake

=== Poetry ===
- Richard Blackmore – Eliza
- Daniel Defoe
  - The Double Welcome
  - The Dyet of Poland
- Complete Tang Poems
- Charles Johnson – The Queen; a Pindaric Ode
- Matthew Prior – An English Padlock
- Ned Ward – Hudibras Redidivus
- Isaac Watts – Horae Lyricae

See also 1705 in poetry

== Births ==
- January 21 – Isaac Hawkins Browne, English poet (died 1760)
- February 13 – Franciszka Urszula Radziwillowa, Polish dramatist (died 1753)
- May – Ambrosius Stub, Danish poet (died 1758)
- June 21 – David Hartley, English philosopher (died 1757)
- September 2 – Abraham Tucker (Edward Search), English philosopher (died 1774)
- October 29 – Gerhardt Friedrich Müller, German historian (died 1783)
- November 23 – Thomas Birch, English historian (died 1766)
- probable – Stephen Duck, English poet (died 1756)

== Deaths ==
- January 4 – Madame d'Aulnoy, French author of fairy tales (born c. 1650)
- January 10 – Étienne Pavillon, French lawyer and poet (born 1632)
- February 5 – Philipp Jakob Spener, German theologian (born 1635)
- April 2 – John Howe, English theologian (born 1630)
- May 5 – Johann Ernst Glück, German writer and translator (born 1654)
- June 10 – Michael Wigglesworth, English poet (born 1631)
- October 17 – Ninon de l'Enclos, French courtesan and salonnière (born 1620)
- November 10 – Justine Siegemund, German writer on midwifery (born 1636)
