= 1638 in literature =

This article contains information about the literary events and publications of 1638.

== Events ==
- January 3 – Joost van den Vondel's historical play Gijsbrecht van Aemstel is first performed, to mark the opening of the Schouwburg of Van Campen, Amsterdam's first public theatre (postponed from 26 December 1637). It is then performed annually in the city on New Year's Day until 1968.
- February 6 – Luminalia, a masque written by Sir William Davenant and designed by Inigo Jones, is staged at the English Court.
- March 27 – The King's Men perform Chapman's tragedy Bussy D'Ambois at the English Court.
- May – English poet John Milton sets out for a tour of the European continent. He spends the summer in Florence where he later claims to have met the incarcerated Galileo.
- October 27 – The King's Men act Ben Jonson's satirical city comedy Volpone (1606) at the Blackfriars Theatre in London.
- unknown dates
  - An Armenian language edition of the Psalms printed in New Julfa (Isfahan) is the first book printed in Persia.
  - The Peking Gazette, official newspaper of the Ming Government in Beijing, makes a switch in its production process from woodblock printing to wooden movable type printing.
  - Swiss-born engraver Matthäus Merian produces his illustrated view of London.

== New books ==
=== Prose ===
- Maximilien de Béthune, duc de Sully – Mémoires ou Sages et Royales Oeconomies d'estat
- Méric Casaubon – A Treatise of Use and Custom
- Johann Amos Comenius – Janua Linguarum Reserata, or a Seed-Plot of All Languages and Sciences
- Sir Kenelm Digby – A Conference With a Lady About a Choice of Religion
- Robert Fludd – Philosophia Moysaica
- Juan Rodriguez Freyle – El Carnero
- Francis Godwin, Bishop of Hereford (died 1633; as Domingo Gonsales) – The Man in the Moone, or the Discovrse of a Voyage thither, an early example of science fiction
- Philippe Labbe - Concordia sacræ et profanæ chronologiæ annorum 5691 ab orbe condito ad hunc Christi annum 1638
- John Lilburne – A Work of the Beast
- Philip Massinger – The Duke of Milan (second quarto)
- John Pell – An Idea of Mathematicks
- Francisco de Quevedo – De los remedios de cualquier fortuna
- Captain John Underhill – News from America, or a New and Experimental Discovery of New England
- John Wilkins – The Discovery of a World in the Moon

=== Drama ===
- Richard Brome – The Antipodes
- Antonio Coello – El conde de Sex, o Dar la vida por su dama
- Pierre Corneille – Le Cid (first English translation)
- Abraham Cowley – Naufragium Joculare (in Latin)
- William Davenant
  - The Unfortunate Lovers
  - The Fair Favorite
  - Luminalia (masque)
  - Brittania Triumphans (masque)
- John Ford
  - The Lady's Trial licensed
  - The Fancies Chaste and Noble published
- Thomas Heywood – The Wise Woman of Hoxton published
- Henry Killigrew – The Conspiracy published
- John Kirke (?) or Wentworth Smith (?) – The Seven Champions of Christendom published
- Tirso de Molina – Las Quinas de Portugal
- Thomas Nabbes – The Bride
- Thomas Randolph – Amyntas, or the Impossible Dowry published
- William Rowley – A Shoemaker a Gentleman published
- Pierre du Ryer – Alcione
- James Shirley
  - The Royal Master performed and published
  - The Duke's Mistress published
- Sir John Suckling – The Goblins
- Lope de Vega – Porfiar hasta morir
- Juan Pérez de Montalbán
  - Los amantes de Teruel
  - Tomo II de comedias

=== Poetry ===
- John Barclay – The Mirror of Minds (posthumous)
- Richard Braithwaite (alias "Corymbaeus") – Barnabee's Journal (In Latin and English versions)
- William Davenant – Madagascar, with other Poems
- Shackerley Marmion – A Funeral Sacrifice, to the Sacred Memory of his Thrice-Honored Father, Ben Jonson
- John Milton – Lycidas

== Births ==
- January 1 – Nicolas Steno (Niels Steenson), Danish scientist (died 1686)
- January 24 – Charles Sackville, 6th Earl of Dorset, English poet (died 1706)
- May 13 – Richard Simon, French Biblical commentator (died 1712)
- August 6 – Nicolas Malebranche, French philosopher (died 1715)
- October – Edmé Boursault, French dramatist and miscellanist (died 1701)
- probable – Hannah Allen, English Protestant writer (year of death unknown)

== Deaths ==
- January 27 – Gonzalo de Céspedes y Meneses, Spanish novelist (born c. 1585)
- April 19 – Jeremias Drexel, German Jesuit religious writer (born 1581)
- June 25 – Juan Pérez de Montalbán, Spanish dramatist, poet and novelist (born c. 1602)
- December 8 – Ivan Gundulić, Croatian Baroque poet (born 1589)
- c. December – John Day, English playwright and poet (born 1574)
