= Stephen Foster (Lord Mayor of London) =

Member of the Parliament of England

Sir Stephen Forster (fl. 1454) was a fishmonger and later Lord Mayor of London.

== Life ==
He was the son of Robert Forster of London, a stockfish merchant. Elected Sheriff of London in 1444, he became Lord Mayor of London in 1454, and served as the city's Member of Parliament in King Henry VI's 13th parliament. According to historian John Strype, Foster married a widow named Agnes, who enlarged Ludgate prison (where Forster had at one time been imprisoned for debt) and improved conditions for those incarcerated therein.

== In literature ==
Agnes and Stephen Forster appear as characters in William Rowley's (1586–1626) play A New Wonder, a Woman Never Vexed, based on their lives.
