= Fop =

Man overly concerned with his appearance

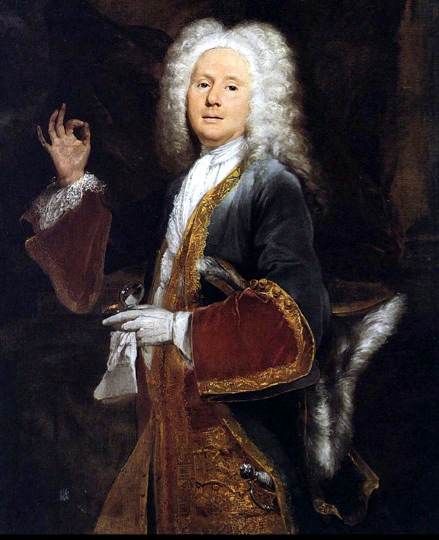
Colley Cibber as Lord Foppington in John Vanbrugh's The Relapse (1696)

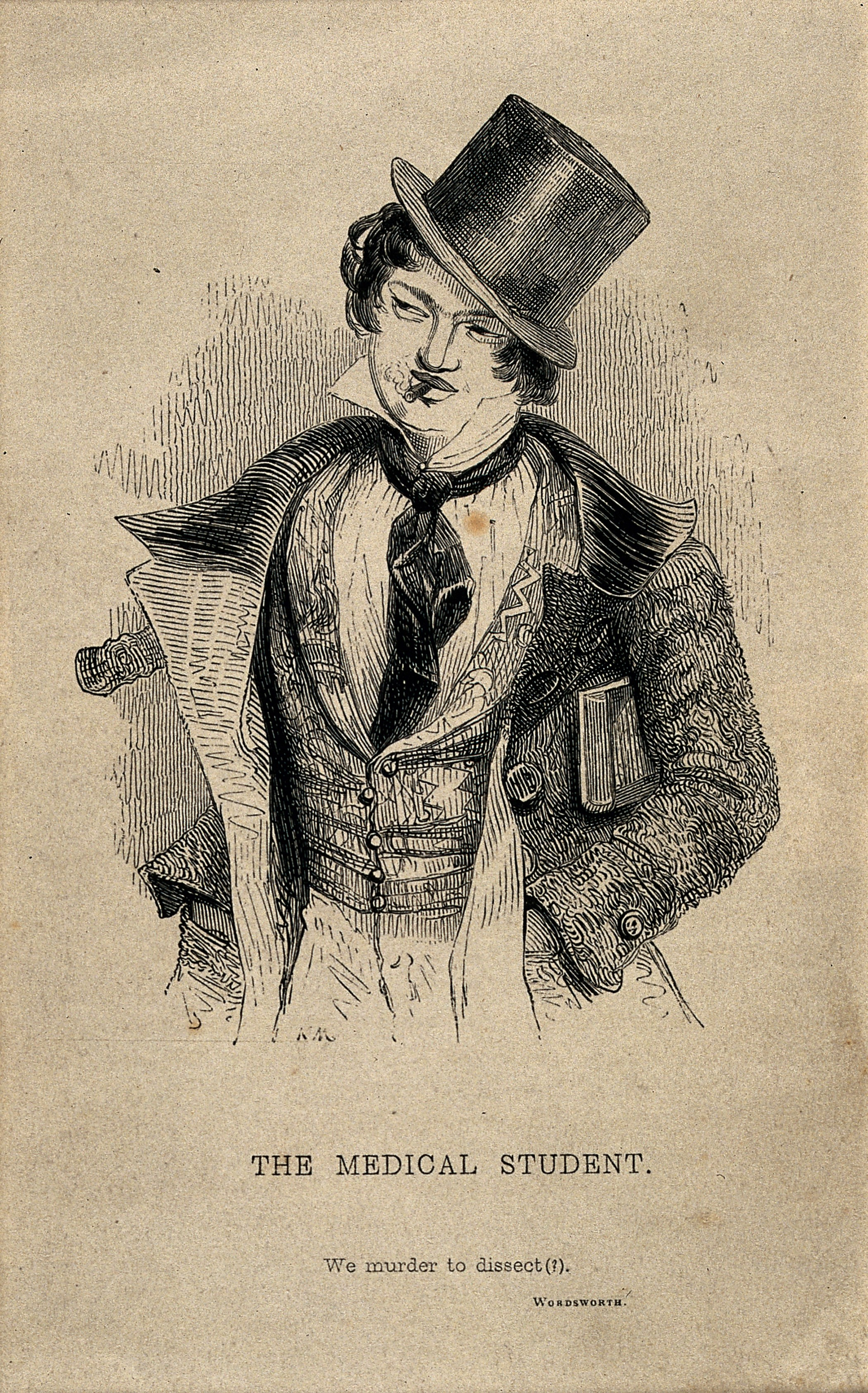
A foppish medical student smoking a cigarette, denoting a cavalier attitude

Fop was a pejorative term for a man excessively concerned with his appearance and clothes in 17th-century England. Some of the many similar alternative terms are: coxcomb, fribble, popinjay (meaning 'parrot'), dandy, and ninny. Macaroni was another term of the 18th century more specifically concerned with fashion.

The pejorative term today carries the connotation of a person, usually male, who is overly concerned with trivial matters (especially matters of fashion) and who affects elite social standing. The term also appears in reference to deliberately camp styles based on eighteenth-century looks.

== Origins ==
The word "fop" is first recorded in 1440 and for several centuries just meant a fool of any kind; the Oxford English Dictionary notes first use with the meaning of "one who is foolishly attentive to and vain of his appearance, dress, or manners; a dandy, an exquisite" in 1672. An early example of the usage is in the Restoration drama The Soldier's Fortune, in which a woman dismisses a potential suitor by saying "Go, you are a fop."

=== In literature and culture ===
The fop was a stock character in English literature and especially comic drama, as well as satirical prints. He is a "man of fashion" who overdresses, aspires to wit, and generally puts on airs, which may include aspiring to a higher social station than others think he has. He may be somewhat effeminate, although this rarely affects his pursuit of an heiress. He may also overdo being fashionably French by wearing French clothes and using French vocabulary. An example of the so-called Frenchified fop is Sir Novelty Fashion in Colley Cibber's Love's Last Shift (1696). Fop characters appear in many Restoration comedies, including sir Fopling Flutter in George Etherege's The Man of Mode, or Sir Fopling Flutter (1676), Aphra Behn's diatribe against politic marriages, The Town Fop (1676, published 1677), and Lord Foppington in The Relapse (1696) by John Vanbrugh. Vanbrugh planned The Relapse around particular actors at the Drury Lane Theatre, including Colley Cibber, who played Lord Foppington. A fop is also referred to as a "beau", as in the Restoration comedies The Beaux' Stratagem (1707) by George Farquhar, The Beau Defeated (1700) by Mary Pix, or the real-life Beau Nash, master of ceremonies at Bath, or Regency celebrity Beau Brummell. The sexual recklessness of "beau" may imply homosexuality.

Shakespeare's King Lear contains the word, in the general sense of a fool, and before him Thomas Nashe, in Summer's Last Will and Testament (1592, printed 1600): "the Idiot, our Playmaker. He, like a Fop & an Ass must be making himself a public laughing-stock." Osric, in Hamlet has a great deal of the fop's affected manner, and much of the plot of Twelfth Night revolves around tricking the puritan Malvolio into dressing as a fop. "Fop" was widely used as a derogatory epithet for a broad range of people by the early years of the 18th century; many of these might not have been considered showy lightweights at the time, and it is possible that its meaning had been blunted by this time.

=== Media of the twentieth century ===
Pulp fiction in the first decade of the twentieth century introduced the secretive action hero who poses as a fop to conceal his identity. In 1903 The Scarlet Pimpernel, protagonist of the novels by Emma Orczy, set the prototype. Sir Percy poses as an overdressed and empty-headed socialite who is the last person anyone would imagine rescuing people from the feared guillotine of the French Revolution. A similar image is cultivated by Don Diego de la Vega, who rights wrongs as Zorro (1919) in stories by Johnston McCulley. The trend continued with the pulp fiction and radio heroes of the 1920s and 1930s and expanded with the arrival of comic books. The original characterisation of Bruce Wayne in the Batman series carried the trend forward.

In Thomas Mann's 1912 novella Death in Venice (as well as the opera by Benjamin Britten and the film by Luchino Visconti) a fop is derided by the main character, Gustave von Aschenbach; ironically so, as Aschenbach ultimately dresses in this manner himself. Some of the "bright young things" of the 1920s were decidedly "foppish" in manner and appearance, while, towards the late 1960s, male fashion became notably foppish in style, evocative loosely of the Georgian and Victorian eras. Pop stars often dressed in what might be termed foppish clothing, with the Kinks' song "Dedicated Follower of Fashion" (1966) capturing well the spirit of the time. While many characters from popular culture had a tendency to foppish appearance, e.g., Adam Adamant Lives!, the third incarnation of Doctor Who and Jason King, they tended not to exhibit mannerisms associated with fops. In Mel Brooks' History of the World, Part I, in the French Revolution sequence, one of the king's court is referred to as "Popinjay". In popular series Blackadder the Third, Hugh Laurie portrayed George, Prince Regent as a distinctly childish fop in contrast to his shrewd and sarcastic butler E. Blackadder (played by Rowan Atkinson).

The British Fops, or Lucien Callow (Mark McKinney) and Fagan (David Koechner), appeared in several episodes during the Saturday Night Live 1995–1996 seasons. The characters first appeared on Weekend Update as the presidents of the Norm Macdonald fan-club, but later appeared in several other sketches, namely monologues. The Fops would appear in late Restoration period clothing and used a silly take on the period's language, mannerisms, culture, and sexual attitudes.

=== Media of the twenty-first century ===
Early examples of the fop in media of the twenty-first century include the hair-obsessed Ulysses Everett McGill (played by George Clooney) in the Coen brothers film O Brother Where Art Thou (2000) and the character of Jack Sparrow (played by Johnny Depp) in the Pirates of the Caribbean film series. Depp's style has been termed "grunge fop". The actor's mannerisms caused concerns among executives at the Walt Disney Company but prevailed, thereby creating a new generation of fans of the fop.

In Channel 4's Vic Reeves Big Night Out, character Graham Lister regularly refers to Reeves as "the Fop". In Quentin Tarantino's 2012 slavery epic Django Unchained, Jamie Foxx's title character, when allowed to choose his own clothing for the first time in his life, chose a decidedly foppish outfit which immediately earned him the nickname "Fancypants". Tarantino's upcoming play The Popinjay Cavalier uses the similar related term "popinjay".

In the 2007 video game Apollo Justice: Ace Attorney, Detective Ema Skye constantly refers to the prosecutor Klavier Gavin as a "glimmerous fop" due to the bling that he would typically wear and his obsession with his appearance. The term fop is also used occasionally to refer to other characters, particularly being picked up by Apollo Justice due to the detective's habit of saying it.

Other examples include Patrick Bateman, the protagonist of the novel American Psycho, and the clothes-obsessed Prince Kai in the book Firebood by Elly Blake (2017).

=== Fop rock ===
The Upper Crust, October 2007, in New York City

A more recent and minor trend is "fop rock", a form of camp in which the performers don 18th-century wigs, lace cravats, and similar costume elements to perform. The style appears to owe something to glam rock, visual kei, and the New Romantic movement. The look was pioneered in the 1960s by Paul Revere & the Raiders. Adam Ant of Adam and the Ants picked up the trend, occasionally performing in elaborate highwayman outfits. Other notable examples would be Falco's performance as Wolfgang Amadeus Mozart in the song "Rock Me Amadeus" (a No. 1 hit in the US, the UK and Canada in 1986), Japanese rock group Malice Mizer, and Boston-based band The Upper Crust. Mid-2000s glam rock revivalists White Hot Odyssey also affected 18th century-style wigs and clothing for their live performances. Prince was known for his foppish clothing in the mid-1980s, with ruffled shirts, tight pants and high-heeled boots.

== See also ==
- Camp (style)
- Dress code
- Hipster
- Metrosexual
- Superfluous man
- Peacock revolution
