= Agnes Forster =

- Died: 1484
- Known for: rebuilding Ludgate prison
- Spouse: Sir Stephen Foster

Lady Agnes Fo(r)ster (died 1484) was a wealthy English woman. She rebuilt Ludgate Prison for debtors. Her accounts are extant.

== Life ==
Agnes was from Kent and she was married to Stephen Foster for twenty years. He had been Lord Mayor of London and he died a rich man and Agnes and his son William were his executors. It has been said that Stephen at some time in his life spent time in Ludgate Prison.

His widow, Agnes, renovated and extended Ludgate and the Debtor's Prison and the practice of making the debtors pay for their own food and lodging was abolished. Her gift was commemorated by a brass wall plaque, which read:

Devout souls that pass this way,
For Stephen Foster, late mayor, heartily pray;
And Agnes, his spouse, to God consecrate,
That of pity this house made, for Londoners in Ludgate;
So that for lodging and water prisoners here nought pay,
As their keepers shall answer at dreadful doomsday!

She was lending hundreds of pounds to others as well as keeping two French knights. They had been captured and they were waiting a ransom to be paid before they could return. The knights were considered an asset and she gave them to her son Robert. However we know from accounts that he had to pay to have one buried in 1482. She was close to her son Robert and when she died in 1484 she chose to be buried close to him.

== In literature ==
Agnes appears as a central character in William Rowley's (1586–1626) play A New Wonder, a Woman Never Vexed, based on her life. In the book it said that Agnes met a man at the prison and paid off his debts and married him.
