= The Lady's Trial =

1639 English play

The Lady's Trial or The Ladies Triall is a Caroline era stage play, a comedy by John Ford. Published in 1639, it was the last of Ford's plays to appear in print, and apparently the final work of Ford's dramatic career. A copy of the play can be found in the Henry E. Huntington Library and Art Gallery under the name The Ladies Triall.

The play was licensed for performance by Sir Henry Herbert, the Master of the Revels, on 3 May 1638. The quarto edition of the following year was issued by the bookseller Henry Shepherd, with a dedication by Ford to his personal friends Sir John Wyrley and his wife, Mary (née Wolley), the illegitimate daughter of Sir Francis Wolley. The title page bears Ford's anagrammatic motto, "Fide Honor," as is usual for Ford publications of the era; and it states that the play was acted by "both their Majesties' servants at the private house in Drury Lane" — that is, by the King and Queen's Young Company, colloquially known as Beeston's Boys, at the Cockpit Theatre. This simply confirms the fact that the play was performed once the London theatres re-opened after the long plague closure of 1636–37.

As Ford's final play, The Lady's Trial departs from the pattern of his earlier works; it is "more like the fashionable Cavalier plays of the court dramatists...there is in the play an artificiality and refinement not found in the earlier plays but pervasive in the court drama of the time." Neither of Ford's two late comedies, The Fancies Chaste and Noble and The Lady's Trial, has ranked high with critics, though The Lady's Trial has benefitted in that it lacks much of the overt bawdry and sexuality of the earlier play, and contains elements "beautiful in language and character" (Havelock Ellis), with "some of Ford's sweetest blank verse and some excellently subtle bits of characterization" (Stuart Pratt Sherman).

== Synopsis ==
The Lady's Trial employs the multiple-plot structure that is typical of Ford and common in the dramas of the era. The main plot concerns Auria, an aristocrat of Genoa, and his marriage to the beautiful and virtuous but lowly-born Spinella. Auria's marriage across class lines is controversial among other Genoese nobles, like his friend Aurelio; when Auria announces that he is going off to the wars against the Turks to repair his fortunes (Spinella brought no dowry), Aurelio opposes the move on two counts: Spinella will be exposed to temptations, and the role of soldier of fortune is unbecoming to a nobleman. Auria replies that he trusts his wife, and that he would rather stand on his own than depend on his friends. The contrast is drawn between the two men: Aurelio is rule-bound and conventional, while Auria is more independent in his judgments.

Aurelio is right in one respect: Spinella is exposed to temptation in her husband's absence. The nobleman Adurni tries to seduce Spinella, though he is so convincingly repulsed that he reforms and abandons his lustful ways. Spinella's reputation is compromised, however, when Aurelio exposes their meeting; even when Adurni confesses his transgression and apologizes to the returned husband, the scandal comes to a head in a formal trial of Spinella ("the lady's trial" of the title). The trial allows Spinella to exonerate herself and prove to the world, and to aristocratic Genoese society, her honor and virtue. Auria accepts Adurni's repentance as sincere, and chooses the path of reason over violent retribution. Adurni in turn takes Spinella's sister Castanna as his bride, as a seal of their reconciliation.

The secondary plot involves the divorced couple Benatzi and Levidolche. Levidolche has been seduced by Adurni; Benatzi seeks to catch her in the act by wooing her in disguise — but Levidolche recognizes him and decides to reform. But she tries to manipulate Benatzi into taking revenge on Adurni — an attempt that fails comically.

The third level, the comic subplot, deals with the Amoretta, a comical young lady with a lisp who has an obsession with horses. She is pursued by two ridiculous suitors. Firstly Guzman, a Spanish soldier with breath smelling of garlic and herring and Fulgoso a good looking but rather dim witted Dutchman who whistles constantly. The two would-be suitors are encouraged by Futelli and Piero for the pairs own amusement. Through various hilarious failed attempts by the two foreigners, the play is provided some much needed comic relief. Amoretta eventually marries the vermin-like Futelli.

The play ends with four marriages; in a pattern typical of the comic genre, everyone has learned his or her lesson. In Auria, Ford's portrayal of a husband who "responds rationally to the rumor of his wife's infidelity" provides a bold departure from, and a stark contrast to, earlier figures in English Renaissance drama like Othello, as well as the precedents of Ford's own earlier plays.

== Historical background ==
The Lady’s Trial was written during the reign of Charles I (1630–1649). King Charles I had successive conflicts with bridal choosing. The people of England did not favor a marriage between Charles I and a Spanish Habsburg princess; nor did they agree with a marriage between Charles I and Henrietta Maria of France. Charles’ I life could have influenced John Ford’s play, The Lady’s Trial, because Prince Auria, similarly, is conflicted with his people's rejection of potential queens of England; however, this is up for interpretation.

== Editions ==
- Hopkins, Lisa, ed. Manchester University Press, 2011. (The Revels plays) ISBN 978-0-7190-7895-8

== Modern productions ==
For two nights in September 2015, Edward's Boys, an all-boys cast from King Edward VI School, Stratford-upon-Avon, performed The Lady's Trial in Shakespeare's Globe's Sam Wanamaker Playhouse.
