= The Conquest of Spain =

Play by Mary Pix

- Original language: English
- Written by: Mary Pix
- Genre: Tragedy

Premiere
- Date: 12 May 1705
- Place: Queen's Theatre

The Conquest of Spain is a 1705 tragedy by the English writer Mary Pix. The play was published anonymously, but has been widely attributed to Pix. It was a reworking of the Jacobean tragedy All's Lost by Lust by William Rowley. It was the first new play to be staged at John Vanbrugh's Queen's Theatre in Haymarket, opened earlier that year, and lasted for six nights.

Set during the Moorish conquest of Spain, the play likely sought to capitalise on growing interest in the region due to the ongoing war being fought there, particularly as the previous year Allied forces had captured Gibraltar.

== Bibliography ==
- Burling, William J. A Checklist of New Plays and Entertainments on the London Stage, 1700-1737. Fairleigh Dickinson Univ Press, 1992.
- Lowerre, Kathryn. Music and Musicians on the London Stage, 1695-1705. Routledge, 2017.
- Nicoll, Allardyce. History of English Drama, 1660-1900, Volume 2. Cambridge University Press, 2009.
