= The Thracian Wonder =

Stage play of English Renaissance drama

The Thracian Wonder is a stage play of English Renaissance drama, a work that constitutes a long-standing and persistent problem for scholars and historians of the subject.

== Publication ==
The Thracian Wonder enters the historical record with its initial 1661 publication, in a quarto printed by Thomas Johnson for the bookseller Francis Kirkman – the only edition of the play in the seventeenth century. The quarto's title page states that the drama "hath been several times acted with great applause," though no hard evidence of the play's date of origin or early productions has survived.

== Genre and source ==
The title page of the original edition describes the play as a "comical history." Scholar Marvin T. Herrick, borrowing from Polonius in Hamlet, termed it a "tragical-comical-historical-pastoral play." The Thracian Wonder is in fact a pastoral comedy; critics have noted its general resemblances with Shakespeare's The Winter's Tale. Both plays derive from the prose romances of Robert Greene, Shakespeare's from Pandosto (1588), and The Thracian Wonder from Menaphon (1589).

More broadly, The Thracian Wonder reveals debts to the works of Edmund Spenser and John Lyly, and can be classed with plays that show the influence of Sidneyan pastoral, like Shirley's The Arcadia.

== Authorship ==
Kirkman's 1661 quarto assigned the authorship of the play to John Webster and William Rowley, though critical opinion has been essentially unanimous in denying Webster any hand in the play. It is possible that Kirkman may have confused the play with the genuine Webster/Rowley work A Cure for a Cuckold, which he also published in 1661.

Nineteenth-century scholars proposed Thomas Heywood as a possible author, and the cases for Rowley and for Heywood have been debated pro and con in the critical literature. Editor Michael Nolan, in his 1997 edition of the play, accepted the work as a Rowley/Heywood collaboration.

(If valid, this attribution would constrain the play's possible date of authorship to the period of Rowley's playwriting career, roughly 1607 to 1625.)

In a 1908 study, O. L. Hatcher pointed out resemblances between The Thracian Wonder and Greene's dramatisation of Orlando Furioso in addition to Menaphon, and on that basis argued for Greene's authorship of The Thracian Wonder – a hypothesis that has not found other support among critics.

== Synopsis ==
The play begins with a scene of dramatic action, as the Thracian princess Ariadne, her infant son in her arms, flees the violent threat of her father Pheander; the Thracian king, his sword drawn, pursues his daughter with the intent of punishing her apparent unchastity. Radagon, the infant's father, bursts in upon the scene to protect Ariadne; but he is the son of the king of Sicily, an enemy of Thrace, and his presence only incenses Pheander more. The king's pursuing courtiers try to palliate Pheander's rage, and succeed to the degree that the king spares the young couple's lives; he decrees that they be set adrift at sea in small boats, and left to the mercy of the winds and waves. (In his impatience the king refuses to listen to his daughter's explanation, which is that she and Radagon are in fact married.)

The play's second scene introduces the characters of the subplot, a group of Thracian shepherds. Among them is Palemon, who is deeply in love with Serena. She spurns his affections; his lack of success in love affects his mental balance, leaving him a "mad lover." His brother Tityrus represents the opposite viewpoint, expressing cynical misogyny (until he himself falls in love later in the play). The scene also introduces the clown Muscod, who provides the play's comic relief in this and subsequent subplot scenes.

Act I closes with a dumbshow, which shows a storm-tossed Ariadne and Ragadon separately rescued by shepherds; a Chorus and a personified Time comment on the action.

Pheander's brother Sophos comes to court to protest his brother's conduct regarding Ariadne; Sophos bears a letter from the princess that explains her marriage. But the intemperate king refuses to listen, and banishes his brother from the kingdom. Thrace is struck by a plague, with many fatalities. Pheander sends to the oracle at Delphi for guidance about the plague, but dislikes the Pythia's dismal and cryptic answer. The king of Sicily invades with his army; Pheander is at first determined to resist, but his military weakness gives him second thoughts. He negotiates a truce with the Sicilians to search for their missing prince Radagon, and takes up the life of a wandering pilgrim while a Sicilian viceroy rules the kingdom.

Both Radagon and Ariadne live among the shepherds under assumed identities, he as "Menalchas" and she as "Mariana." At one point they are elected the king and queen of a shepherds' festival, but fail to recognise each other. (This inability of characters to recognise their friends and loved ones in changed circumstances can strike modern readers as absurd and imbecilic; but it is a recurring element in the popular literature and drama of the era. To select only one of many possible examples, Heywood's The Four Prentices of London features characters with the same handicap.) "Menalchas" does fall in love with "Mariana," however, because she so strongly resembles the supposedly dead Ariadne.

The scene shifts to Africa, where Sophos is shown with the King of Africa and his daughter and courtiers. In his exile, Sophos has won the friendship of the ruler of the Moors, who is now prepared to intervene in Thracian affairs. Also present is Eusanius, the son of Ariadne and Radagon. An infant at the start of the play, he is now a young man of twenty, eager for military adventure. He and the king's daughter, Lillia Guida, are attracted to each other; when the king realises this he grows irate, and exiles Eusanius. The young man returns to Thrace, and he too falls in with the shepherds, meeting both Ariadne and Radagon – without knowing they are his parents. Ariadne feels a strong emotional bond toward both men, who react jealously to each other.

While wandering in his pilgrim guise, Pheander also arrives on the scene, and is struck by Ariadne/Mariana, the "shepherds' queen." He abducts her and returns to court to resume his rule. The shepherds rise up in rebellion to rescue their "queen" – but then join forces with Pheander when the armies of Sicily and Africa arrive. The final scenes depict a confusion of battle among the assembled forces. Eusanius captures his unknown grandfather, the Sicilian king, and turns his prisoner over to the shepherds' commander, his unknown father Radagon. Radagon, however, knows his own father, and switches sides to defend him.

The conflict eventually boils down to a single combat between Radagon and Eusanius; but before they can kill each other, their true identities are revealed, and the differences among the principals are resolved. Eusanius, the lost child who triumphantly returns as heir to the kingdom, is the "Thracian wonder" of the title. (Obscure plot points, such as the reason for Eusanius's presence in Africa with Sophos, are also elucidated.) Among the shepherds, Palemon is wounded in the battle; the shock helps to cure his love-madness, and also helps Serena realise that she actually loves him. Palemon and Serena are happily united at the play's end, as are Radagon and Ariadne, and Eusanius and Lillia Guida; peace and amity are restored.
