= The Inhumane Cardinal; or, Innocence Betrayed =

Novella written by Mary Pix

The Inhumane Cardinal; or, Innocence Betrayed is a novella written by Mary Pix and published in 1696. It claims to recount the misdeeds of a papal mistress, and also satirizes the enemies of Queen Anne of Great Britain.

== Plot ==
The novel takes place in Rome, where Donna Olimpia, the amoral mistress of Pope Innocent X, tries to gain power over Antonio Barbarino (the cardinal of the novel's title). She seizes her chance when Antonio admits to lusting after Melora, the French Ambassador's daughter. Olimpia makes friends with Melora, and tells her romantic stories designed to persuade the inexperienced younger woman to fall for Antonio's seduction. Olimpio narrates the first story, 'the History of Alphonsus and Cordelia', which tricks Melora into believing that Antonio is in fact Alphonsus, the heir to the Duke of Ferrara. Francisco (a favourite of Antonio) narrates the second story, 'the History of Emilius and Lovisa', which persuades Melora that true lovers can triumph over all odds (including their public duties and even parental opposition) in order to be together.

As a result of Olimpia's deception, the naive Melora is tricked into secretly 'marrying' Antonio (she does not realise that this marriage is actually non-legal). After some months, Antonio grows tired of Melora and decides to murder her. She is given poison and dies, despite the efforts of Francisco (who now repents his role in her seduction) to save her in time.

== Reception ==
The Inhumane Cardinal first brought Pix's writing to public attention, and may even have won her the patronage of Queen Anne or her circle. Despite this, it has received little scholarly attention. However, Sonia Villegas Lopez suggests that it is a significant text for understanding the history of the novel because (1) it combined different subgenres at a time when the new narrative form of the novel was being significantly reconfigured; and (2) it marks a standpoint in this narrative evolution, as its very structure plays with the notions of ‘truth’ and ‘virtue’.

Steven Moore also argue that the novella has some distinctive features:

'Although The Inhumane Cardinal isn't great literature ... it stands apart from other novels of the period because of its bleak view of human nature. ... It is pervaded with the Jacobean sense of life as passionate, cruel, and corrupt. Though written by a woman, it is unusually harsh on women - Pix harps upon their vanity, ambition, duplicity, and gullibility - and it is one of the few novels of the time that makes explicit reference to sodomy'.
