= Luminalia =

Late Caroline era masque or "operatic show"

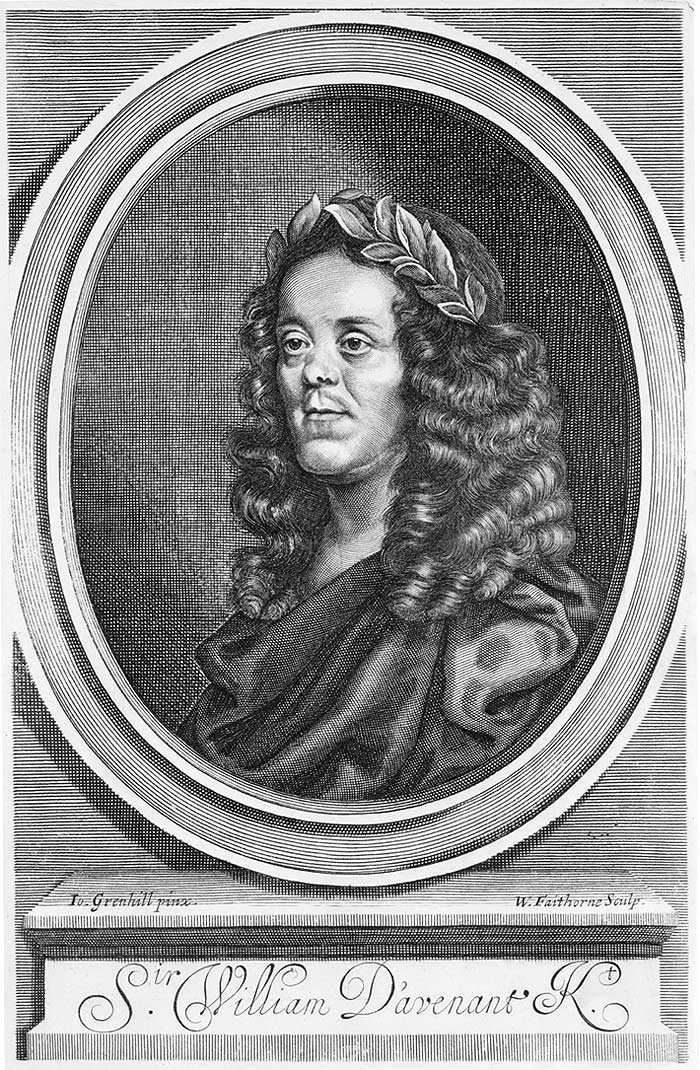
William Davenant, operator of one of the first licensed theatre companies post-Restoration

Luminalia or The Festival of Light was a late Caroline era masque or "operatic show", with an English libretto by Sir William Davenant, designs by Inigo Jones, and music by composer Nicholas Lanier. Performed by Queen Henrietta Maria and her ladies in waiting on Shrove Tuesday, 6 February 1638, it was one of the last and most spectacular of the masques staged at the Stuart Court.

== Text ==
Modern critics have disputed how much of the masque's text was actually generated by Davenant. The current view is that "Davenant was responsible for the songs, and perhaps for the prose descriptions, but the action and argument were plagiarized from Italian sources by Inigo Jones." This was in keeping with Jones's primacy in the courtly masque in the 1630s. After Chloridia in 1631, Jones's contentious, quarter-century-long masquing collaboration with Ben Jonson ended; in their long-running contest of wills and egos, Jones had won and Jonson had lost. With Aurelian Townshend's 1632 masques, Albion's Triumph and Tempe Restored, Jones's influence became paramount. Jones, however, was not a literary man; the text of Luminalia has been called "in terms of poetry and literary ideas...the most incoherent and meaningless of the masques...."

Davenant's-or-Jones's story for the masque involves the Muses of classical Greek mythology. Driven from Greece by Thracian invaders, and then from Italy by the Vandals and Goths, the Nine wander in search of a new home, finally finding it in Britain, "the garden of Britanides," with a welcoming king and queen. The production was unusual in that the comic and grotesque figures in the anti-masques were played by "gentlemen of quality," including the Duke of Lennox and the Earl of Devonshire. This was a major departure from earlier practice: when Jonson first introduced the anti-masque in his The Masque of Queens (1609), the roles in the anti-masque were filled by professional actors, and no aristocrat would have lowered himself to such an activity.

== Illumination ==
As its title indicates, Luminalia featured remarkable lighting effects. This was entirely consistent with what Jones had achieved in the masque form over the previous three decades; contemporary accounts of Jacobean and Caroline Court masques often stress the sheer dazzling abundance of light in the productions. In a world limited to candlelight and firelight, the spectacles of the masques showed audiences a brilliance of illumination they saw nowhere else. The season's previous masque, Britannia Triumphans, had ended with the fall of night, and Luminalia picked up from that point, opening with a moonlit forest scene with deep shadows of trees and artificial moonlight glinting off a "calm river." The anti-masques, featuring thieves, watchmen and various dream figures, are set in a City of Sleep. (Luminalia has been interpreted as a work of Catholic propaganda, in which the Queen of Night is the Protestant Queen Elizabeth.) Innovative lighting effects continued through the work: it concluded with an "aerial ballet" in which Henrietta Maria, portraying the "Earthly Deity," descended from the clouds in "a glory of rays, expressing her to be the queen of brightness."

The sheer abundance of illumination forced a change of venue for the masque's performance. Masques were usually staged in the Banqueting House at Whitehall Palace—but it was feared that the new Rubens murals on the ceiling there would be damaged by candle soot. Luminalia was moved to a temporary structure, which Puritan detractors dubbed "the Queen's dancing barn."

== Publication ==
The text of the masque was published shortly after its 1638 performance, in a quarto printed by J. Haviland for the bookseller Thomas Walkley, with the fulsome title Luminalia or the Festivall of Light Personated in a Masque at Court by the Queenes Majestie and her Ladies. Davenant's name is not mentioned in the first edition, while Jones's is prominent. Early scholars and critics, confused by similar titles in the historical records, actually tried to attribute Luminalia to Thomas Lodge and Robert Greene, though both men were long dead by 1638.

== Music ==
The music for the masque was composed by Nicholas Lanier. One of his songs for the work, called the Song of Night (beginning with the line "In wet and cloudy mists I slowly rise"), was something of a popular hit in its era; its verses were often reprinted.

== Sources ==
- Britland, Karen. Drama at the Courts of Queen Henrietta Maria. Cambridge, Cambridge University Press, 2006.
- Findlay, Alison. Playing Spaces in Early Women's Drama. Cambridge, Cambridge University press, 2006.
- Leapman, Michael. Inigo: The Troubled Life of Inigo Jones, Architect of the English Renaissance. London, Headline Book Publishing, 2003.
- Logan, Terence P., and Denzell S. Smith, eds. The Later Jacobean and Caroline Dramatists: A Survey and Bibliography of Recent Studies in English Renaissance Drama. Lincoln, NE, University of Nebraska Press, 1978.
- Orgel, Stephen. The Authentic Shakespeare, and Other Problems of the Early Modern Stage. London, Routledge, 2002.
- Shell, Alison. Catholicism, Controversy, and the English Literary Imagination, 1558–1660. Cambridge, Cambridge University Press, 1999.
- Walls, Peter. Music in the English Courtly Masque, 1604–1640. Oxford, Clarendon Press, 1996.
