= A Match at Midnight =

Jacobean era stage play

A Match at Midnight is a Jacobean era stage play first printed in 1633, a comedy that represents a stubborn and persistent authorship problem in English Renaissance drama.

== Publication ==
The play was entered into the Stationers' Register on 15 January 1633 (new style), and was published later that year in a quarto printed by Augustin Matthews for the bookseller William Sheares. The 1633 quarto was the play's sole edition in the seventeenth century.

== Date ==
The date of the play's origin and stage premier cannot be fixed with certainty, though scholars have interpreted the text's contemporary allusions as indicating a date in the early 1620s, with c. 1622 commonly given as a good approximation. The records of Sir Henry Herbert, the Master of the Revels, license an otherwise-unknown play called A Match or No Match on 6 April 1624; similarity of authorship data (see below) suggests that A Match or No Match is an alternative title for A Match at Midnight, and its date of 1624 conforms to the dating of the play to the early 1620s.

== Performance ==
The title page of the 1633 quarto states that the play was acted by the "Children of the Revells" – though no specific information on any production has survived, and there is no guarantee that that company premiered the work onstage.

A Match at Midnight was never revived in its original form after the London theatres re-opened with the Restoration in 1660. But in the early nineteenth century, James Robinson Planché combined material drawn from the play with extracts from Jasper Mayne's The City Match to create a theatrical hybrid he called The Merchant's Wedding. This work premiered in 1828 and enjoyed some success; it was printed three times in its century.

== Authorship ==
The title page of the 1633 first edition assigns the authorship of A Match at Midnight to "W. R." In his 1624 notation, Herbert assigned A Match or No Match to "Rowley." Traditionally, critics have tended to combine the two pieces of data, and attribute A Match at Midnight to William Rowley. The style of the play was considered to show a fair measure of conformity with the style of Rowley's known works, and a few specific traits in the play seem to conform to Rowley's mannerisms. For one example of the latter, compare the mention of "Sir Nicholas Nemo" (nemo being Latin for "no one") in A Match at Midnight, IV, iii with "Sir Nichodemus Nothing" in The Birth of Merlin, III,i.

Given the frequency of Rowley's collaborations with Thomas Middleton, some nineteenth-century critics examined A Match at Midnight as a potential Middleton/Rowley work. Yet the total absence of Middleton's highly individual and characteristic pattern of textual preferences has led modern scholars to dismiss any possibility of Middleton's involvement.

The play's unusual pattern of textual evidence has been read as indicating that the play might also not be a solo work by Rowley; discontinuities in the text appear to indicate multiple authorship. Some critics have gone as far as to argue that Rowley may be as absent from the work as Middleton. Yet no convincing alternative candidate for author has been identified.

== Synopsis ==
The play's plot centers on the fortunes of an old usurer named Bloodhound and his three children, his sons Alexander and Tim and his daughter Moll. Bloodhound has fallen out with his elder son Alexander, who is a prodigal and reprobate, and has decided to make his foolish younger son Tim his heir. The opening scene shows Tim running his father's pawnbroking business, making small loans to London tradesmen on their tools. Tim is seconded by a family servant named Sim; the two form a comedy team that provides much of the play's humor.

Bloodhound is busy arranging a double marriage to advance the fortunes of his family. He is pursuing a rich Widow (otherwise unnamed) for himself, and is arranging a marriage between his 15-year-old daughter Moll and a decrepit 70-year-old scrivener named Innocent Earlack. Bloodhound plans both weddings for the same day, to save on costs. Moll is repulsed at the prospect of such an unsuitable match; she is in love with a young soldier, Ancient Young. ("Ancient" was a low-level military rank, sometimes equated with the modern "ensign." In Othello, Iago is an ancient.) Ancient Young mortgaged his family estate with Bloodhound; he returns to pay off the loan, but is four days late, and so loses his lands to the usurer.

Alexander Bloodhound keeps company with a crew of low-life characters. Captain Carvegut and Lieutenant Bottom are two incompetent thieves; when they try to rob an eccentric Welshman named Randall, he ends up robbing them instead. Alexander and his cronies do manage to entice brother Tim into a journey through the taverns of London, among cheaters, bawds, and prostitutes.

Randall the Welshman has come to London to marry the same Widow sought by Bloodhound; though he has never met the woman, he is attracted by her reputation of wealth, youth, and beauty. Quickly, though, Randall switches his intentions to Moll Bloodhound. The Welshman is not without his charms: the Widow's maid Mary develops an infatuation for him. Moll Bloodhound has no use for either suitor, Randall or Earlack. (She is a type character in English Renaissance drama, the sensible virgin pursued by foolish suitors. Another instance of the type is Jane Bruin in A New Wonder, a Woman Never Vexed.)

The Widow is sought after by other fortune-hunters, and Bloodhound is afraid of losing her; even his son Alexander is after the woman. The Widow enjoys this state, and reveals that she has little intention of actually marrying Bloodhound; her servant Jarvis aids her in evading and misdirecting the attentions of her suitors. Since the women wear masks in public, there is a good deal of mistaken identity in the night, as characters dodge the watchmen through the streets of London. When Bloodhound thinks he has found the Widow, he is actually with an old bawd, Mistress Coote. Randall thinks he is meeting Moll Bloodhound in the dark; he is with Mary the maid. Moll and Ancient Young do manage to find each other, and marry.

With the connivance of the servant Jarvis, Alexander Bloodhound sneaks into the Widow's bedroom to confront her. To avoid exposure and scandal, the Widow agrees to marry Alexander.

The day of the planned wedding arrives, but turns into a day of exposure and revelations. Tim shows up with a new bride in tow; he thinks her name is Lindabrides, and that she is "descended from the Emperour Tribatio of Greece" – though she is actually "a common whore" called Sue Shortheels. Bloodhound discovers that the woman he thinks is his Widow is Mistress Coote. Randall is surprised to find himself married to Mary the maid instead of Moll Bloodhound, but decides to make the best of the bargain. The genuine Widow states that she has no intention of marrying anyone; she will remain true to the memory of her late husband. It is a fortunate decision – since her servant Jarvis reveals that he is the missing husband, still alive. He pretended a death abroad to see how his wife would react – a version of the chastity test common in the plays of the era. (For an earlier use of this plot, of the husband who pretends an absence from London to spy on his wife and manipulate events, see Westward Ho.)

The play ends with at least a formal return to a moral order. Ancient Young and Moll Bloodhound are happily married, and Randall and Mary are no worse off. Bloodhound and Alexander reconcile their differences when Alexander promises to reform. The bawd and the whore are sent to Bridewell prison.
