= The Deceiver Deceived =

Comedy written by Mary Pix

The Deceiver Deceived is a comedy written by Mary Pix, first performed in 1697.

Pix's unpublished manuscript was rejected by the actor and producer George Powell, who subsequently plagiarized it in his play Imposture Defeated (1697).

== Plot ==
The play is about the misogynistic Melito Bondi, a Venetian senator who pretends to be blind in order to avoid the expense of becoming President of Dalmatia. As he is forced to continue the pretense in front of his family, Bondi must put up with the liberties that they subsequently take.

The resourceful widow Lady Temptyouth helps Olivia (Bondi's wife) and Ariana (his daughter) to meet their gallants, Count Andrea and Fidelio. Bondi is secretly furious about Temptyouth's influence, but cannot interfere because she is also involved in his financial businesses. During the play Temptyouth helps to find a wealthy husband for Lucinda, an illegitimate girl whom she has raised.

Towards the end of the play, Bondi reforms and becomes a somewhat less repulsive character. Olivia decides to remain faithful to Bondi and decides not to see her beloved Andrea again so long as she remains married to Bondi. For his part, Bondi plans to poison Olivia. He ultimately decides against killing his wife, and he permits Ariana to marry the penniless Fidelio.

== Reception ==
The Deceiver Deceived was performed by Betterton's company in late November 1697 at Lincoln's Inn Fields, however there is no record of the length of its run.

The play seems to have been more successful in print than on the stage, and remained in print for several years.

Jane Milling states that Pix ultimately gained from the plagiarism fiasco, as she obtained the public support of leading actors and literary figures including Mrs. Barry, Peter Motteux and William Congreve.
