= Ibrahim, the Thirteenth Emperor of the Turks =

She-tragedy written by Mary Pix

Ibrahim, the Thirteenth Emperor of the Turks is a she-tragedy written by Mary Pix, first performed in 1696. Pix's first play, it purported to describe incidents in the life of Ibrahim, Sultan of the Ottoman Empire. The numbering is correct only if Mehmed the Conqueror is regarded as the first emperor, and the disputed reign of his son Cem is counted as well. The play has been called a "proto-feminist depiction of the power-struggle between a sultan and a seraglian woman".

== Plot ==
The play focuses on Emperor Ibrahim and his rape of Morena. Sheker Para (Ibrahim's mistress) seeks revenge after being rejected by Amurat. She encourages Ibrahim to seduce Morena, a young woman who is engaged to Amurat. Morena rejects Ibrahim's advances so he orders her to be dragged to a chamber, where he violently rapes her. Afterwards, a Mufti describes how terribly Morena has been treated by Ibrahim. The injured Morena takes poison and dies in Amurat's arms, but not before inspiring a revolution against Ibrahim.

== Reception ==
The play was very successful when first performed in 1696, and was also performed several times in 1704. It was also revived in 1715.

Paula de Pando suggests that in the figure of Morena, Pix:

"has presented a victimized heroine who becomes, in her final hours, an emblem of the ravaged nation under an absolutist regime. ... The idea of passivity becoming active political commitment for those that survive the female victim is a significant development from Banks' Anna [the heroine of his drama Virtue Betrayed, or, Anna Bullen (1682)], who advocates quietism and trusts Providence: Morena claims the necessity of a revolution that would vindicate her name and end Ibrahim's regime.
