= All's Lost by Lust =

Jacobean tragedy by William Rowley

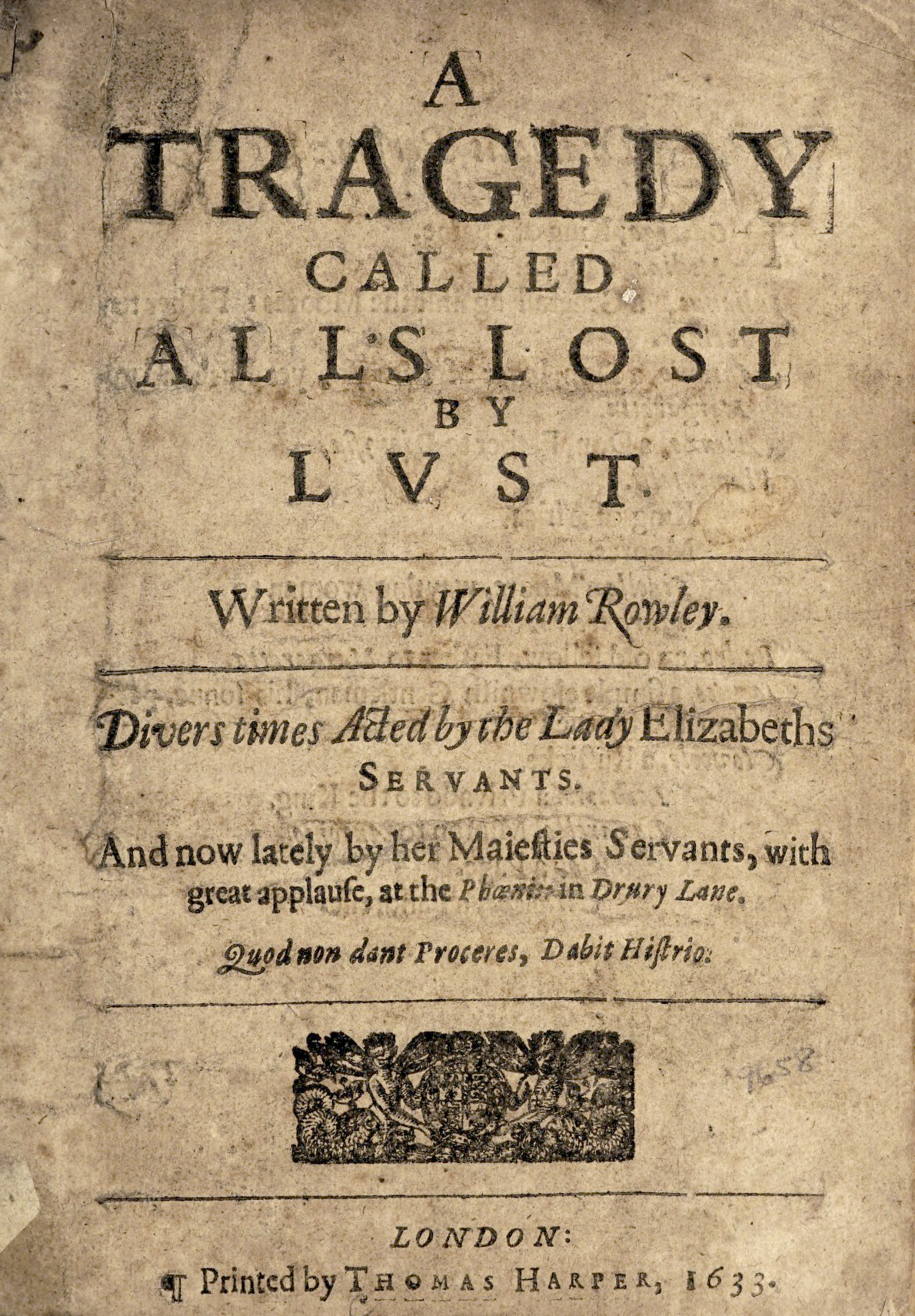
Title page of the 1633 quarto of All's Lost by Lust

All's Lost by Lust is a Jacobean tragedy by William Rowley. A "tragedy of remarkable frankness and effectiveness," "crude and fierce," it was written and first performed between 1611 and 1621, although not published until 1633.

== Publication ==
The play was entered into the Stationers' Register on 27 September 1632 and published in 1633 (seven years after Rowley's death) in a quarto printed by the bookseller Thomas Harper. It was not reprinted until the nineteenth century.

== Performance ==
All's Lost by Lust was first performed by Rowley's playing company, Prince Charles' Men, and later by the Lady Elizabeth's Men and Queen Henrietta's Men. The play was popular in its own period and was revived during the Restoration; Samuel Pepys saw George Jolly's production at the Red Bull Theatre on 23 March 1661. In his famous Diary, Pepys described the production as "poorly done" with "much disorder" — when a boy singer performed a song poorly, the music master "fell about his ears and beat him so, that it put the whole house into an uproar."

Like many English Renaissance plays, Rowley's tragedy was adapted for later productions. One "W. C." was responsible for a version called The Rape Reveng'd, or the Spanish Revolution in 1690. A 1705 adaptation titled The Conquest of Spain in credited to Mary Pix.

Since then, the work has fallen out of favour and has not been revived.

== Genre ==
Rowley's reputation as an author is grounded on his comedies; All's Lost by Lust is his only surviving tragedy. The tragicomic Fitzallen subplot in A Fair Quarrel and the opening and closing scenes in The Changeling are other rare examples of the serious side of Rowley's authorship.

All's Lost by Lust has been classed with other Jacobean tragedies that treat the private crime of rape in a larger political and social context, Including John Fletcher's Valentinian and Bonduca, and Thomas Middleton's Hengist, King of Kent and The Revenger's Tragedy, among other works of the era that feature a "tyrant-rapist" figure.

Rowley's tragedy "might be called a rape play with a difference." Its "ideological surprises" include a would-be warrior woman, a "murderously jealous wife...their conscience-ridden, bigamous husband...and the post mortem ménage à trois that unites all three. And that is only the sub-plot...."

== The clown ==
The play's comic relief is supplied largely by the clown character Jaques; the Dramatis Personae of the 1633 quarto states that Jaques was "personated by the Poet." Rowley had a habit of composing comic roles for himself to play; he wrote and played the clown part of Bustopha in The Maid in the Mill, his late collaboration with Fletcher. The comic parts of Chough in A Fair Quarrel and Simplicity in The World Tossed at Tennis, two of his collaborations with Thomas Middleton, fall into the same category, as do some other clown roles in other Rowley plays. (Rowley's self-penned roles are recognisable as "fat clown" roles, since Rowley was by all evidence a man physically equipped to fill such parts.)

== Synopsis ==
The play is based on the Spanish legends about the Moorish invasion of Spain in the eighth century. It depicts the tale of Roderick, the last Visigoth king of Spain, and his general Julianus, based on the legendary Julian, count of Ceuta. (Rowley's specific sources for the story are not known, though he had a large body of traditional lore, poems, and ballads on which to base his work.)

As the play opens, the Moorish invasion of Spain is in the offing; King Roderick musters his army and places it under the command of Julianus. Roderick himself is more interested in seducing the general's daughter Jacinta; his sycophant and pander Lothario brings in an old bawd named Malena to help convince the young woman to yield her virginity. Roderick is also troubled by an empty treasury; he plans to remedy the problem by breaking into an enchanted castle, isolated and secluded by many previous kings, that he believes holds a great treasure.

The play's second and third scenes introduce the characters of the subplot. Antonio is a young nobleman, infatuated with and courting a young woman named Margaretta. She is a commoner, and Antonio's friend Lazarello complains about the social inequality of the proposed match. Margaretta's father is also uneasy about the match, but her brother, Jaques the clown, is its eager advocate. Antonio marries Margaretta hurriedly before leaving for military duty; the marriage, for the time being, is kept secret.

Lothario brings Malena and Jacinta together at Roderick's court, and the old pandress tries her best to make Jacinta pliant, but with no success. Roderick enters, and drags Jacinta offstage to rape her. Julianus, meanwhile, leads his forces south to meet the Moors. He and his officers, including Antonio, stop at the castle of Alonzo; they meet Alonzo's beautiful and extroverted daughter Dionisa. Antonio and Dionisa are instantly attracted to each other, and Antonio comes to regret his hasty marriage to Margaretta. The Spanish forces engage the Moorish invaders and win the battle, capturing many leading Moorish officers; Antonio distinguishes himself by his courage. Lazarello favours a match between Antonio and Dionisa, and advises Antonio on various ways to put aside his secret wife.

Lothario keeps Jacinta imprisoned in a castle after her rape; but Jacinta obtains his keys while he sleeps, and escapes. She goes to her father and tells him of her violation. Julianus is overwhelmed by the offence to his family's honour and by his king's betrayal; his officers rally his spirits by staging a review of his troops and the prisoners he has taken, including the Moorish king, Muly Mumen. Julianus tells them of his daughter's rape, and the offended troops agree to support a rebellion against Roderick; Julianus releases Muly Mumen and his men from captivity and the two commanders form an alliance against Roderick.

Margaretta learns of Antonio's betrayal; though a commoner by birth, she is too proud and spirited to accept it. She writes a deceptive letter to her husband, delivered by her brother the clown, that indicates that she will acquiesce to becoming his concubine rather than his wife. Lazarello has a plan to break the connection permanently: he will go to Margaretta in the night in Antonio's place. (This is a reversal of the standard bed trick that is so common in plays of Rowley's era, in which the man rather than the woman is substituted.) Lazarello says that he will not have sex with Margaretta, in deference to Antonio's honour; but after spending the night with her he will be able to claim that he has dishonored her, allowing Antonio an escape from the now-unwanted marriage. Margaretta, however, conspires with her servant Fydella to murder Antonio; on the crucial night, the two women strangle Lazarello with a rope, thinking they are killing Antonio.

The murder is quickly exposed, though not the confusion of identities. Jaques the clown meets Lothario, who is now in disgrace over his loss of Jacinta; both men plan on hanging themselves. The two have a sort of competition of suicidality; Lothario offers to pay Jaques to hang him, and Jaques, greedy and unsuited to honourable gestures like suicide, accepts the offer.

Roderick breaks into the vault of the supposedly enchanted castle; instead of finding a treasure, he witnesses a macabre spiritual procession that reveals his fate, which is to be defeated by the Moors and to lose his Christian kingdom to the forces of Islam.

Together, Julianus and Muly Mumen defeat Roderick; but the Moorish king quickly betrays his new ally, blinding Julianus and cutting out Jacinta's tongue. Margaretta meets Dionisa escorting Antonio, who has been wounded in the battle. He dies of his wounds. Dionisa calls Margaretta "a lusty stout virago," and suggests they marry each other and "beget chimeras." Instead, the two women stab themselves over Antonio's body.

Muly Mumen offers the blinded Julianus a chance for revenge, arming the general and letting him attack his tormentor. But his ploy is a cruel joke, in which Julianus stabs his own daughter. She dies in his arms, and he dies of grief. Muly Mumen ends the play by setting off to pursue the fleeing Roderick and consolidate his conquest of the kingdom.

== Racism ==
Rowley consistently characterizes the Moors as "black," and portrays them as stereotypical villains, bloodthirsty and treacherous. In this he reflects the typical attitudes of his time, as expressed in plays like Lust's Dominion, Peele's The Battle of Alcazar, and Shakespeare's Titus Andronicus among other works that include Moors and North African Muslims. Rowley modifies the stereotype somewhat in his portrayal of Margaretta's serving maid Fydella, a young Moorish woman who is courageous and fiercely devoted to her mistress.
