= Ludgate =

Former and Westernmost gate in London Wall

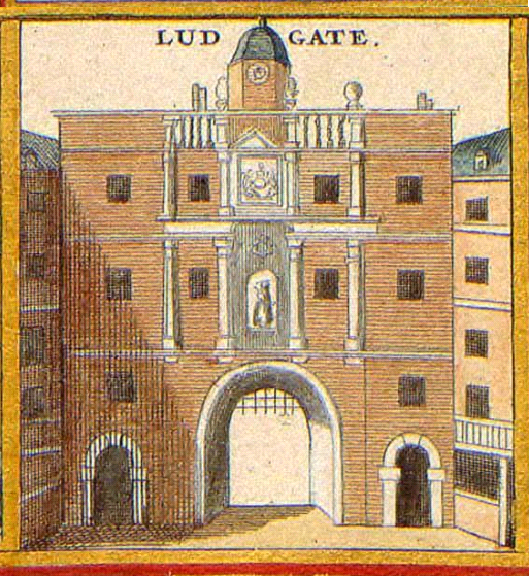
- An old illustration of the gate c. 1650
- Interactive map of the Ludgate area

General information
- Location: London, England
- Coordinates: 51°30′50.3″N 0°06′08.2″W

Ludgate was the westernmost gate in London Wall. Of Roman origin, it was rebuilt several times and finally demolished on 30 July 1760. The name survives in Ludgate Hill, an eastward continuation of Fleet Street, Ludgate Circus and Ludgate Square. The gates' materials were sold for £148.

== Etymology ==
According to legend, recorded by the Norman-Welsh cleric Geoffrey of Monmouth, Ludgate was named after the ancient British King Lud. Lud was said to be the brother of King Cassivelaunus but some folklorists think he is a manifestation of the god Nodens. There are other suggestions for the origins of the name, although none has been universally accepted. Later writers said it was derived from "flood gate" or "Fleet gate", from "ludgeat", meaning "back gate" or "postern", or from the Old English term "hlid-geat" a common Old English compound meaning "postern" or "swing gate".

== History ==
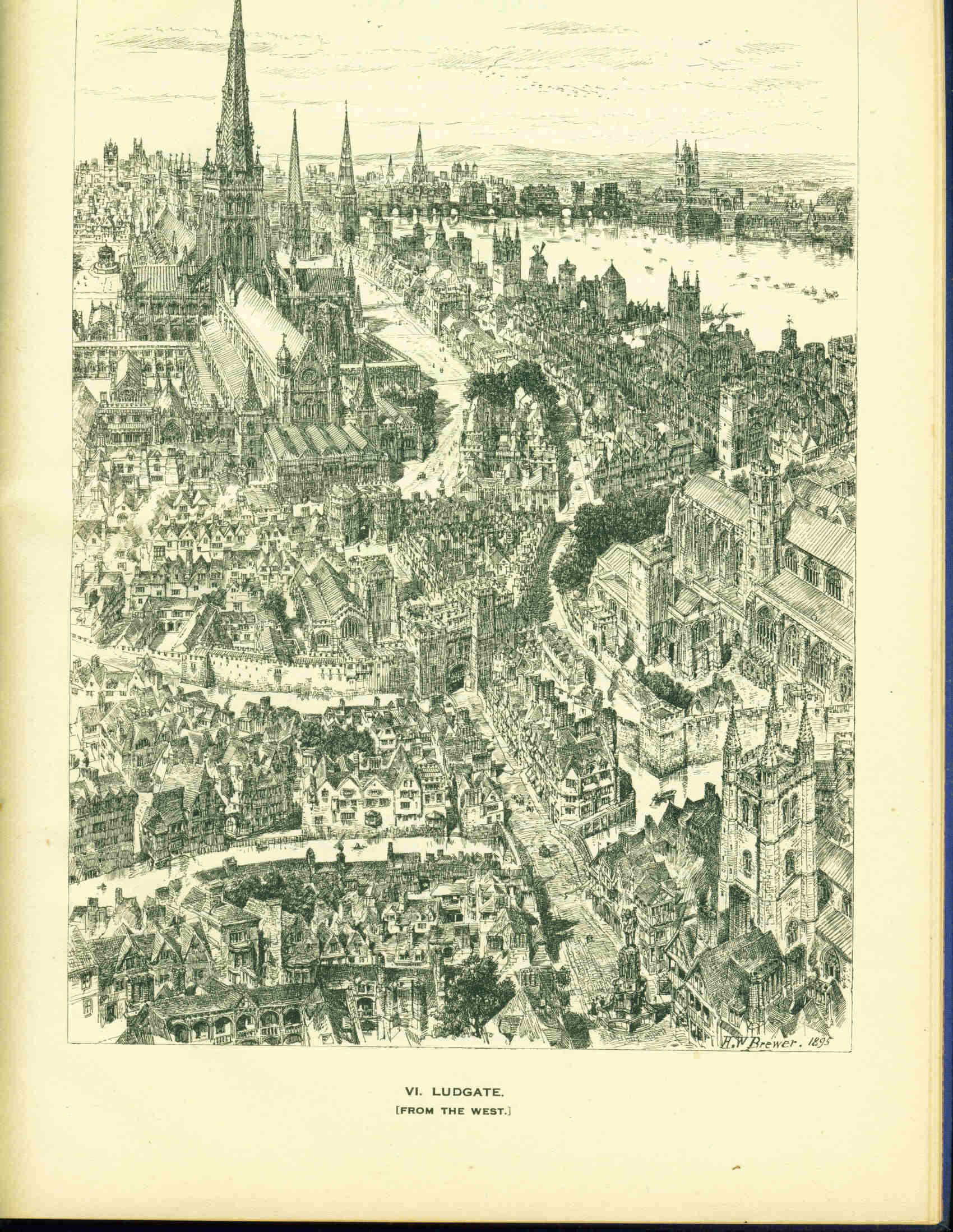
Lud Gate and surrounding area in the sixteenth century (as imagined in 1895)

Ludgate is believed to have been one of four original gates in the Roman London Wall, work on which started in 190 AD.

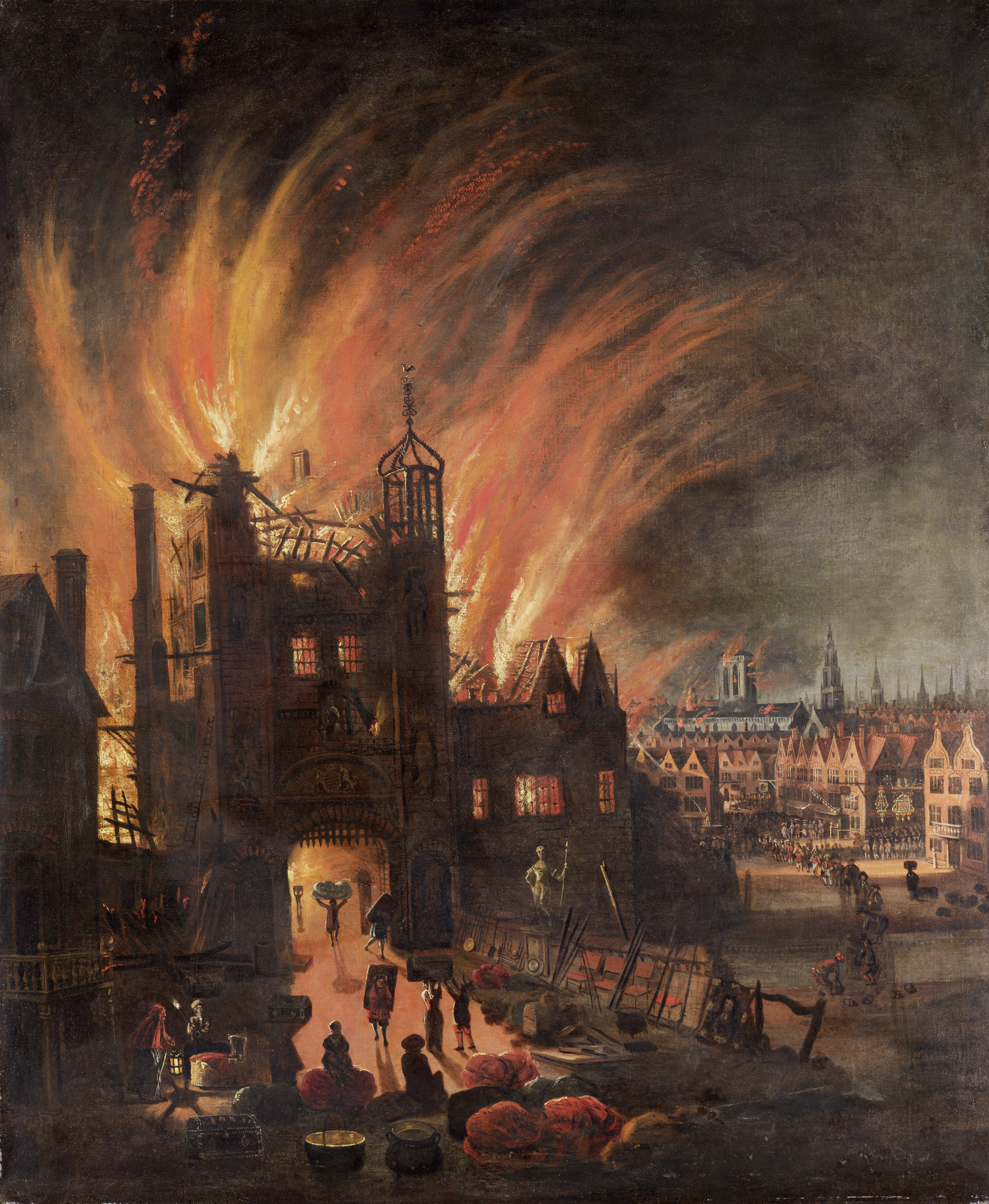
Ludgate in flames in 1666. Oil painting by anonymous artist, circa 1670.

Anti-royalist forces rebuilt the gate during the First Barons' War (1215–17) using materials recovered from the destroyed houses of Jews. The gate was rebuilt about 1450 by a man called Foster who at one time was lodged in the debtors' prison over the gate. He eventually became Sir Stephen Foster, Lord Mayor of London. His widow, Agnes, renovated and extended Ludgate and the debtor's prison; the practice of making the debtors pay for their own food and lodging was also abolished. Her gift was commemorated by a brass wall plaque, which read:

Devout souls that pass this way,

For Stephen Foster, late mayor, heartily pray;
And Dame Agnes, his spouse, to God consecrate,
That of pity this house made, for Londoners in Ludgate;
So that for lodging and water prisoners here nought pay,
As their keepers shall answer at dreadful doomsday!

In February 1554, Ludgate was the final setting of Wyatt's rebellion, when Sir Thomas Wyatt the Younger arrived at the gate with part of his army numbering three or four hundred men. The gate was defended by Lord William Howard with the local militia, who refused entry to the rebels, causing them to retreat and later surrender.

Ludgate was rebuilt in 1586 to the design of William Kerwin; niches in the facade were furnished with statues of Queen Elizabeth I and King Lud with his two sons; these statues replaced medieval ones that had been defaced by Protestant iconoclasts during the reign of King Edward VI. The gateway was finally demolished in 1760 at the request of the local citizens. It was still in use as a debtor's prison, so the inmates were transferred to the City workhouse in Bishopsgate. The statues from the facade were preserved at the Church of St Dunstan-in-the-West in Fleet Street. When the church was rebuilt in 1831, they were sold and taken to Hertford Villa in Regent's Park, but were returned to the church in 1935. Elizabeth's statue now stands in a niche over the vestry door, while the others are inside the porch.

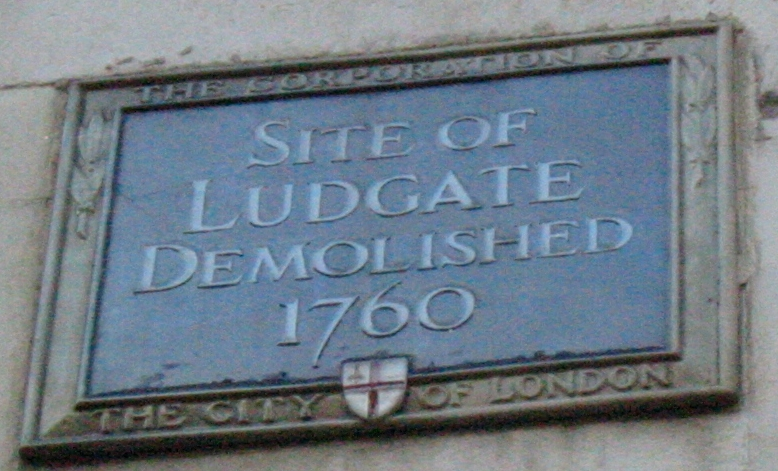
Plaque marking the location of Ludgate

== In literature ==
- Ludd's Gate is mentioned in Bernard Cornwell's novel Sword Song, set during the reign of Alfred the Great.
- Ludgate is mentioned in Geoffrey of Monmouth's Historia Regum Britanniae, written around 1136. According to the pseudohistorical work the name comes from the Welsh King Lud, who he claims also gave his name to London.
- Ludgate is mentioned in Maria McCann's novel As Meat Loves Salt, set during the English Civil War.
- Ludgate appears in Walter de la Mare's poem "Up and Down", from Collected Poems 1901–1918, Vol. II: Songs of Childhood, Peacock Pie, 1920.
- Ludgate appears in part III of Burnt Norton, the first of T. S. Eliot's Four Quartets. It is the last named of the seven "gloomy hills of London".

== See also ==
- City gate
- City wall
- Fortifications of London
- London
- King Lud
- Nuada
