= The Fancies Chaste and Noble =

Stage play by John Ford

The Fancies Chaste and Noble is a Caroline-era stage play, a comedy written by John Ford, and notable for its treatment of the then-fashionable topic of Platonic love.

== Date and performance ==
The dates of authorship and first performance of the play are uncertain, though the limited historical information does provide some clues. The title page of the first edition states that the play was acted by Queen Henrietta's Men at the Phoenix or Cockpit Theatre. Queen Henrietta's Men performed at the Cockpit from their inception in late 1625 to May 1636, when the theatres of London suffered their longest shutdown due to bubonic plague. When the theatres finally re-opened in October 1637, the Queen Henrietta's company was ensconced in the Salisbury Court Theatre, not the Cockpit. Some scholars point to the 1635–36 interval as the most likely time for the play's genesis — though a few dissenters date the play as early as 1631.

== Publication ==
The play was first published in 1638. The quarto was published by the bookseller Henry Seile, who had issued Ford's The Lover's Melancholy nine years earlier. Like other quartos of Ford's plays, the title page bears Ford's anagrammatic motto "Fide Honor". Ford dedicated the play to Lord Randal MacDonnell, 1st Marquess of Antrim and Lord Viscount Dunluck (1609–83).

== Burton ==
Robert Burton's The Anatomy of Melancholy is an important influence on Ford's canon as a whole; one clear index of that influence occurs Ford's choice of setting for The Fancies. In Vol. 3 of his masterwork, Burton notes that the northern European custom of men and women dancing together is not tolerated in Italy, except for the city of Siena; Ford sets his play in Siena, and has men and women dancing together at the wedding of Secco and Morosa in Act II, scene ii.

== Platonic love ==
The subject of Platonic love was highly fashionable in the court of Charles I, especially with Queen Henrietta Maria, her ladies in waiting, and their coterie of courtier poets and dramatists, like Sir John Suckling. It is not surprising that Ford would choose the subject for dramatic treatment. The treatment he gave the subject, however, was roundly condemned for its "coarseness" and "prurience" by more straightlaced later critics, especially those of the Victorian era. The play relies heavily on the spectre of virtue and chastity tested by false accusations and suspicions and tricks — that strange obsession of English Renaissance drama.

== Synopsis ==
As is normal in his dramaturgy, Ford provides the play with a multi-level plot. The main plot portrays the bachelor Octavio, Marquis of Siena, and his establishment of his "Bower of Fancies," something like a Platonic academy for those he calls the "fancies" — Clarella, Silvia, and Floria, three young women who are, or are said to be,"young, wise, noble, fair, and chaste." The three are widely believed to be Octavio's paramours, and the Bower of Fancies his harem. Livio, newly arrived at the court, is a friend to Octavio's nephew, Troylo-Savelli. Livio's sister Castamela is also brought in as a companion to the "fancies" — and becomes a target for the apparent amorous intentions of both the Marquis and his nephew. An underlying plot is eventually revealed: Castamela has been brought to the court by the nephew, to separate her from her suitor Romanello so that the nephew can marry her himself. The three "fancies" turn out to be, not the sexual partners of the Marquis, but his nieces and wards.

In the second-level plot, the spendthrift Fabricio has sold his wife Flavia to Julio, a wealthy nobleman. Flavia pretends to embrace her new fortune, adopting the fashionable tastes and habits of a nouveau-riche aristocrat — though she still loves her first husband. When Fabricio, regretting what he's done, bids her farewell to join a religious order, Flavia can barely hide her sorrow. Flavia resists amorous suits from two noblemen, Camillo and Vespucci, to prove her honor to her brother (Romanello) and her new husband.

The comic subplot concerns the barber Secco and his marriage to Morosa, the older "religious matron" who serves as the guardian of the Fancies. The page Nitido and the character Spadone are involved with them in bawdy humour.
