= John Ford (dramatist) =

English poet and playwright (1586 – c. 1639)

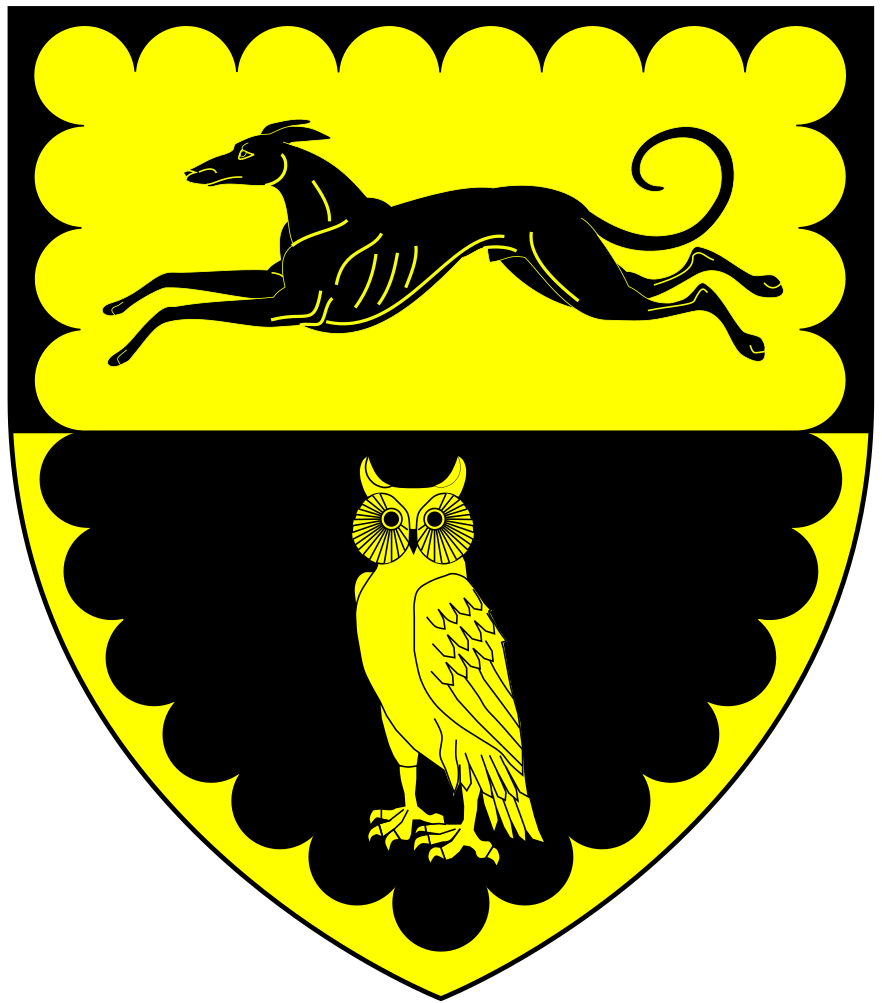
Arms of Ford of Bagtor and Nutwell: Party per fesse or and sable, in chief a greyhound courant in base an owl within a bordure engrailed all counter-changed

John Ford (1586 – c. 1639) was an English playwright and poet of the Jacobean and Caroline eras born in Ilsington in Devon, England. His plays deal mainly with the conflict between passion and conscience. Although remembered primarily as a playwright, he also wrote a number of poems on themes of love and morality.

== Origins ==
John Ford was baptised 17 April 1586 at Ilsington Church, Devon. He was the second son of Thomas Ford (1556–1610) of Bagtor in the parish of Ilsington, and his wife Elizabeth Popham (died 1629) of the Popham family of Huntworth in Somerset. Her monument exists in Ilsington Church. Thomas Ford's grandfather was John Ford (died 1538) of Ashburton (the son and heir of William Ford of Chagford) who purchased the estate of Bagtor in the parish of Ilsington, which his male heirs successively made their seat. The Elizabethan mansion of the Fords survives today at Bagtor as the service wing of a later house appended in about 1700.

== Life and work ==
Ford left home to study in London, although more specific details are unclear—a sixteen-year-old John Ford of Devon was admitted to Exeter College, Oxford, on 26 March 1601, but this was when the dramatist had not yet reached his sixteenth birthday. He joined an institution that was a prestigious law school but also a centre of literary and dramatic activity—the Middle Temple. A prominent junior member in 1601 was the playwright John Marston. (It is unknown whether Ford ever actually studied law while a resident of the Middle Temple, or whether he was strictly a gentleman boarder, which was a common arrangement at the time).

It was not until 1606 that Ford wrote his first works for publication. In the spring of that year he was expelled from Middle Temple, due to his financial problems, and Fame's Memorial and Honour Triumphant soon followed. Both works are clear bids for patronage: Fame's Memorial is an elegy of 1169 lines on the recently deceased Charles Blount, 1st Earl of Devonshire, while Honour Triumphant is a prose pamphlet, a verbal fantasia written in connection with the jousts planned for the summer 1606 visit of King Christian IV of Denmark. It is unknown whether either of these brought any financial remuneration to Ford; yet by June 1608 he had enough money to be readmitted to the Middle Temple.

Prior to the start of his career as a playwright, Ford wrote other non-dramatic literary works—the long religious poem Christ's Bloody Sweat (1613), and two prose essays published as pamphlets, The Golden Mean (1613) and A Line of Life (1620). After 1620 he began active dramatic writing, first as a collaborator with more experienced playwrights—primarily Thomas Dekker, but also John Webster and William Rowley—and by the later 1620s as a solo artist.

Ford is best known for the tragedy 'Tis Pity She's a Whore (1633), a family drama with a plot line of incest. The play's title has often been changed in new productions, sometimes being referred to as simply Giovanni and Annabella—the play's leading, incestuous brother-and-sister characters; in a nineteenth-century work it is coyly called The Brother and Sister. Shocking as the play is, it is still widely regarded as a classic piece of English drama. It has been adapted to film at least twice: My Sister, My Love (Sweden, 1966) and 'Tis Pity She's a Whore (Belgium, 1978).

He was a major playwright during the reign of Charles I. His plays deal with conflicts between individual passion and conscience and the laws and morals of society at large; Ford had a strong interest in abnormal psychology that is expressed through his dramas. His plays often show the influence of Robert Burton's The Anatomy of Melancholy. While virtually nothing is known of Ford's personal life, one reference suggests that his interest in melancholia may have been more than merely intellectual. The volume Choice Drollery (1656) asserts that

Deep in a dump alone John Ford was gat,
With folded arms and melancholy hat.

== The canon of Ford's plays ==
Ford began his dramatic career in a way common in the period, by contributing to plays co-authored with more established dramatists. Six such plays survive:

- The Laws of Candy (1620; printed 1647), with Philip Massinger;
- The Witch of Edmonton (1621; printed 1658), with Thomas Dekker and William Rowley;
- The Welsh Ambassador (1623; printed 1920), with Dekker;
- The Spanish Gypsy (licensed 9 July 1623; printed 1653), with Dekker, Thomas Middleton, and Rowley;
- The Sun's Darling (licensed 3 March 1624; revised 1638–39; printed 1656), with Dekker;
- The Fair Maid of the Inn (1626; printed 1647), with Massinger, John Webster, and John Fletcher.

The attributions of several of these plays to their various authors were often debated or regarded as uncertain. Such questions were placed beyond reasonable doubt in 2017 with the publication of Volume II of The Collected Works of John Ford, ed. Brian Vickers, which contains 300 pages of evidence and discussion clearly identifying each of the above authors' contributions to those six plays. Darren Freebury-Jones has proposed that Ford was responsible for completing The Noble Gentleman after John Fletcher died in 1625.

After 1626 Ford made the transition to sole author and wrote a further eight surviving plays:

- The Queen (1627; printed 1653)
- The Lover's Melancholy (licensed 24 November 1628; printed 1629)
- The Broken Heart (1629; printed 1633)
- 'Tis Pity She's a Whore (1631; printed 1633)
- Love's Sacrifice (1632; printed 1633)
- Perkin Warbeck (1633; printed 1634)
- The Fancies Chaste and Noble (1636; printed 1638)
- The Lady's Trial (licensed 3 May 1638; printed 1639)

As is typical for pre-Restoration playwrights, a significant portion of Ford's output has not survived. Lost plays by Ford include The Royal Combat and Beauty in a Trance, plus more collaborations with Dekker: The London Merchant, The Bristol Merchant, The Fairy Knight, and Keep the Widow Waking, the last also with William Rowley and John Webster.

In 1940, critic Alfred Harbage argued that Sir Robert Howard's play The Great Favourite, or The Duke of Lerma is an adaptation of a lost play by Ford. Harbage noted that many previous critics had judged the play suspiciously good, too good for Howard; and Harbage pointed to a range of resemblances between the play and Ford's work. The case, however, relies solely upon internal evidence and subjective judgements.

== Poetry ==
As well as the poems already mentioned, several others have survived. In the 1920s, Australian-born composer John Gough set Ford's "Beauty's Beauty" to music.
