= The Beau Defeated =

The Beau Defeated. Or, The Lucky Younger Brother is a comedy from the Restoration era by Mary Pix.

== Genesis ==
Pix wrote in her foreword, that her play was adapted from Le Chevalier a la Mode by Florent Carton Dancourt (1687). Pix's changes to several aspects of the story include substantially different characters and new dimensions in the plot. Comparing the two led McLaren to see more clearly Pix's "comic gifts and her dramatic and moral concerns.” Elisabeth Heard, on the other hand, states that recent research has concluded that the play's author is unknown.

== Plot ==
The plot combines and contrasts stories about two wealthy widows. Mrs. Rich is not an aristocrat, but she was married to a banker. Lady Landsworth is an aristocrat and was married to a dissolute man who severely limited her freedom to leave the house. The widows are very interested in finding new husbands. Mrs. Rich want a titled spouse; Lady Landsworth wants a gentleman who is educated and interested in the arts.

The play is unusual for its time because it assigns an equal amount of spoken lines to men and women.

== Notable performances ==
The first performance was directed by Thomas Betterton. Jo Davies directed a production at The Swan Theatre in Stratford-upon-Avon in 2016; the Royal Shakespeare Company staged a retitled version called The Fantastic Follies of Mrs. Rich in 2018.

== Publication ==
The play was first published by W. Turner and R. Basset in London in 1700.
