= Mary Pix =

British writer (1666–1709)

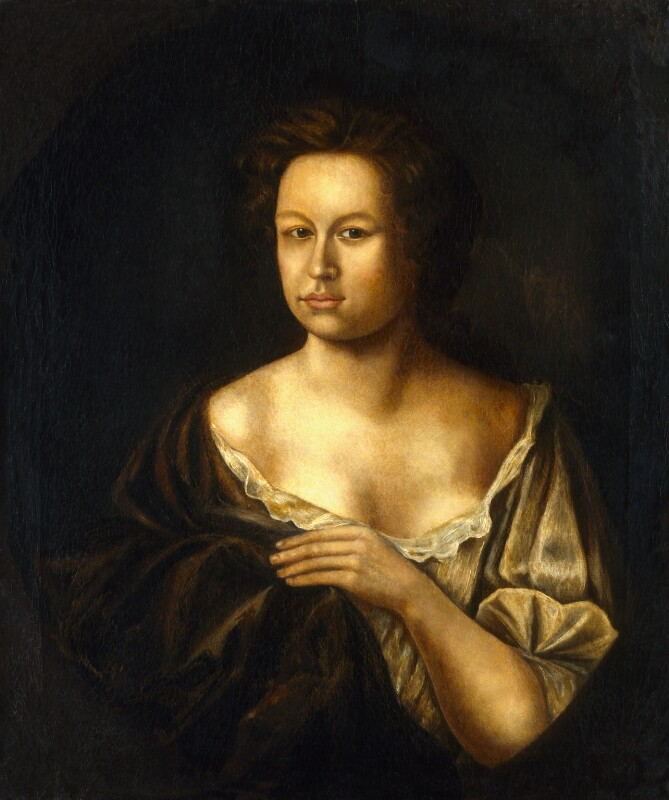
Mary Pix

Mary Pix (1666 – 17 May 1709) was an English novelist and playwright. As an admirer of Aphra Behn and colleague of Susanna Centlivre, Pix has been called "a link between women writers of the Restoration and Augustan periods".

== Early years ==
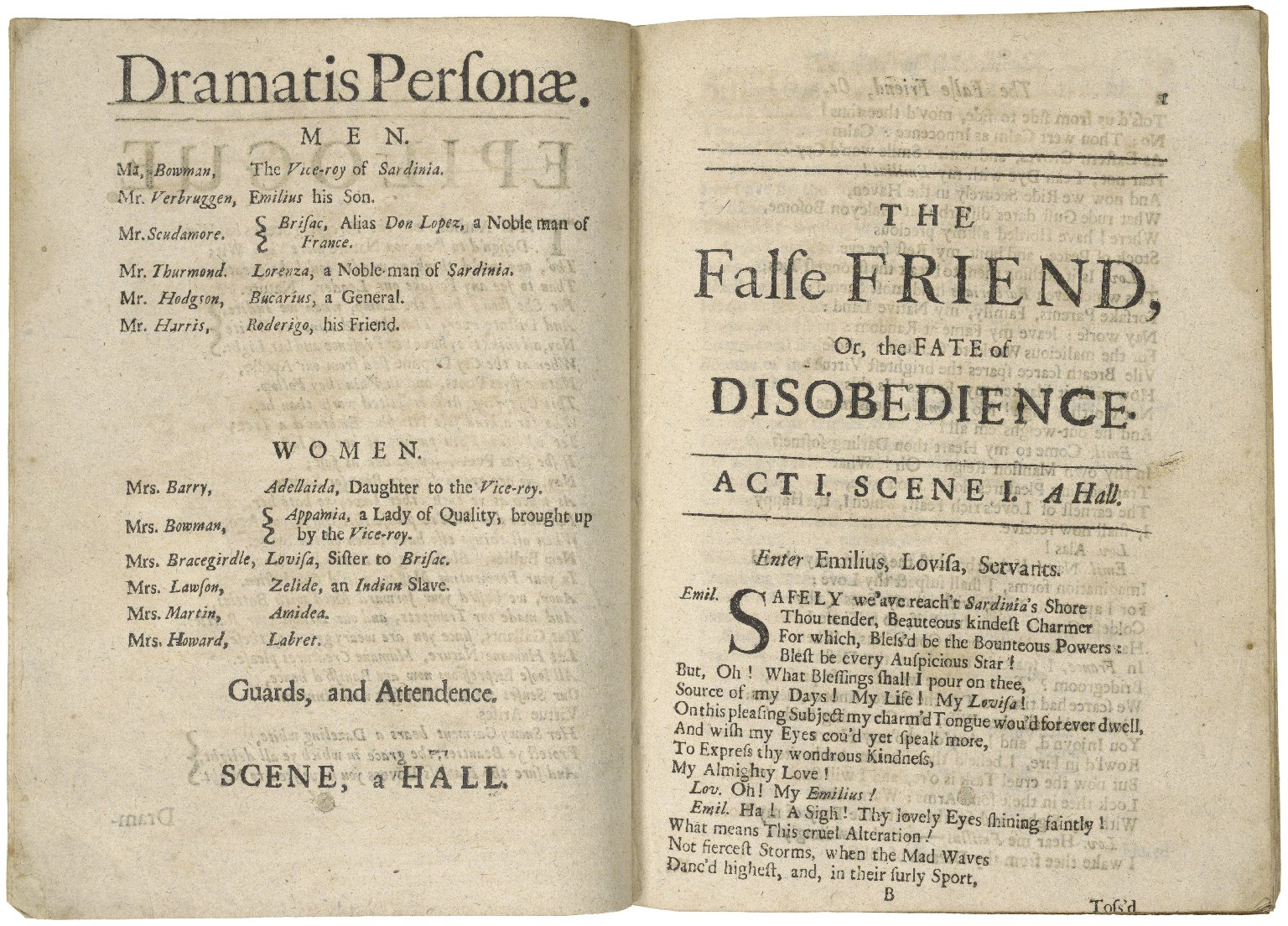
The Dramatis personae from a 1699 edition of Pix's The False Friend.

Mary Griffith Pix was born in 1666, the daughter of a rector, musician and Headmaster of the Royal Latin School, Buckingham, Buckinghamshire; her father, Roger Griffith, died when she was very young, but Mary and her mother continued to live in the schoolhouse after his death. She was courted by her father's successor Thomas Dalby, but he left with the outbreak of smallpox in town, one year after a fire that burned the schoolhouse.

In 1684, at the age of 18, Mary Griffith married George Pix (a merchant tailor from Hawkhurst, Kent). The couple moved to his country estate in Kent. Her first son, George (b. 1689), died very young in 1690. The next year the couple moved to London and she gave birth to another son, William (b. 1691).

== Career ==
In 1696, when Pix was thirty years old, she first emerged as a professional writer, publishing The Inhumane Cardinal; or, Innocence Betrayed, her first and only novel, as well as two plays, Ibrahim, the Thirteenth Emperour of the Turks and The Spanish Wives.

Though from quite different backgrounds, Pix quickly became associated with two other playwrights who emerged in the same year: Delariviere Manley and Catherine Trotter. The three female playwrights attained enough public success that they were criticised in the form of an anonymous satirical play The Female Wits (1696). Mary Pix appears as "Mrs. Wellfed one that represents a fat, female author. A good rather sociable, well-matured companion that would not suffer martyrdom rather than take off three bumpers in a hand". She is depicted as an ignorant woman, though amiable and unpretentious. Pix is summarised as "foolish and openhearted".

Her first play was put on stage in 1696 at the Theatre Royal, Drury Lane, near her house in London but when that same theatrical company performed The Female Wits, she moved to Lincoln's Inn Fields. They said of her that "she has boldly given us an essay of her talent … and not without success, though with little profit to herself". (Morgan, 1991: xii).

In the season of 1697–1698, Pix became involved in a plagiarism scandal with George Powell. Powell was a rival playwright and the manager of the Drury Lane theatrical company. Pix sent her play, The Deceiver Deceived to Powell's company, as a possible drama for them to perform. Powell rejected the play but kept the manuscript and then proceeded to write and perform a play called The Imposture Defeated, which had a plot and main character taken directly from The Deceiver Deceived. In the following public backlash, Pix accused Powell of stealing her work and Powell claimed that instead he and Pix had both drawn their plays from the same source material, an unnamed novel. In 1698, an anonymous writer, now believed to be Powell, published a letter called "To the Ingenious Mr. _____." which attacked Pix and her fellow female playwright Trotter. The letter attempted to malign Pix on various issues, such as her spelling and presumption in publishing her writing. Though Pix's public reputation was not damaged and she continued writing after the plagiarism scandal, she stopped putting her name on her work and after 1699 she only included her name on one play, in spite of the fact that she is believed to have written at least seven more. Scholars still discuss the attribution of plays to Pix, notably whether or not she wrote Zelmane; or, The Corinthian Queen (1705).

In May 1707 Pix published A Poem, Humbly Inscrib'd to the Lords Commissioners for the Union of the Two Kingdoms. This would be her final appearance in print. She died two years later.

Wider Context

Few of the female playwrights of Mary Pix's time came from a theatrical background and none came from the aristocracy: within a century, most successful actresses and female authors came from a familiar tradition of literature and theatre but Mary Pix and her contemporaries were from outside this world and had little in common with one another apart from a love for literature and a middle-class background.

At the time of Mary Pix, "The ideal of the one-breadwinner family had not yet become dominant", whereas in 18th-century families it was normal for the woman to stay at home taking care of the children, house and servants, in Restoration England husband and wife worked together in familiar enterprises that sustained them both and female playwrights earned the same wage as their male counterparts.

Morgan also points out that "till the close of the period, authorship was not generally advertised on playbills, nor always proclaimed when plays were printed", which made it easier for female authors to hide their identity so as to be more easily accepted among the most conservative audiences.

As Morgan states, "plays were valued according to how they performed and not by who wrote them. When authorship ―female or otherwise― remained a matter of passing interest, female playwrights were in an open and equal market with their male colleagues".

== Reception and legacy ==
Pix's plays were very successful among contemporary audiences. Each play ran for at least four to five nights and some were even brought back for additional shows years later. Her tragedies were quite popular, because she managed to mix extreme action with melting love scenes. Many critics believed that Pix's best pieces were her comedies. Pix's comedic work was lively and full of double plots, intrigue, confusion, songs, dances and humorous disguise. An Encyclopaedia of British Women Writers (1998) points out that

Forced or unhappy marriages appear frequently and prominently in the comedies. Pix is not, however, writing polemics against the forced marriage but using it as a plot device and sentimentalizing the unhappily married person, who is sometimes rescued and married more satisfactorily."(Schlueter & Schlueter, 1998: 513)

Although some contemporary women writers, like Aphra Behn, have been rediscovered, even the most specialised scholars have little knowledge of works by writers such as Catherine Trotter, Delarivier Manley or Mary Pix, despite the fact that plays like The Beau Defeated (1700), present with a wider range of female characters than plays written by men at the time. Pix's plays generally had eight or nine female roles, while plays by male writers only had two or three.

A production of The Fantastic Follies of Mrs Rich (or The Beau Defeated) played as part of the 2018 season at the Royal Shakespeare Company.

== Works ==
Pix produced one novel and seven plays. There are four other plays that were published anonymously, that are generally attributed to her.

Melinda Finberg notes that "a frequent motif in all her works is sexual violence and female victimization" - be that rape or murder (in the tragedies) or forcible confinement or the threat of rape (in the comedies).

=== Novel ===
- The Inhumane Cardinal; or, Innocence Betrayed (1696)

=== Plays ===
- Ibrahim, the Thirteenth Emperor of the Turks (1696)
- The Spanish Wives (1696)
- The Innocent Mistress (1697)
- The Deceiver Deceived (1697)
- Queen Catharine; or, The Ruines of Love (1698)
- The False Friend; or, the Fate of Disobedience (1699)
- The Beau Defeated; or, the Lucky Younger Brother (1700)
- The Double Distress (1701)
- The Czar of Muscovy (1701), attributed to Pix although not published in her name
- The Different Widows; or, Intrigue All-A-Mode (1703), attributed to Pix
- Zelmane; or, the Corinthian Queen (1705), attributed to Pix (though some scholars still debate this attribution)
- The Conquest of Spain (1705), attributed to Pix
- Adventures in Madrid (1706) attributed to Pix.

=== Poetry ===
- Violenta; or, The Rewards of Virtue, Turn'd from Boccace into Verse (1704)

== See also ==
- Fop
