= The Birth of Merlin =

Jacobean play, probably written by William Rowley

The Birth of Merlin, or, The Child Hath Found his Father is a Jacobean play, probably written in whole or part by William Rowley. It was first performed in 1622 at the Curtain Theatre in Shoreditch. It contains a comic depiction of the birth of the fully grown Merlin to a country girl, and also features figures from Arthurian legend, including Uther Pendragon, Vortigern, and Aurelius Ambrosius.

== Authorship ==
The 1662 first edition of The Birth of Merlin was a quarto printed by Thomas Johnson for the booksellers Francis Kirkman and Henry Marsh; it attributed the play to William Shakespeare and William Rowley. Merlin is thus one of two plays published in the seventeenth century as a Shakespearean collaboration, the other being The Two Noble Kinsmen. Most scholars reject the attribution to Shakespeare and believe that the play is Rowley's, perhaps with a different collaborator. The play has occasionally been revived in the modern era, for example at Theatr Clwyd.

The Birth of Merlin shares a significant relationship with Cupid's Revenge, a play in the Beaumont and Fletcher canon. Large-scale resemblances in plotting – the missing prince, the ruler and his heir who both fall in love with the same woman – could be explained through derivation from common sources; but these larger-scale elements are supported by multiple specific lines and passages that occur in both plays. (Note: Compare, for example, "Wilde-fire and Brimstone eat thee!" in Merlin, III,vi,108, with "wild-fire and brimstone take thee" in Cupid's Revenge, V,ii,49. Act/scene division and lineation can vary among editions; these citations refer to the text of Merlin in Brooke (1908) and to the text of Cupid's Revenge in Bowers (1970). Other common passages occur in Merlin, II,ii,35–39 and 72–81 and III,vi,83–84, and Cupid's Revenge, I,v,5–11, IV,i,2–7, and V,ii,44–48.)

The early critics who first discovered these commonalities took them as evidence that Beaumont and Fletcher had a hand in the authorship of The Birth of Merlin. This view, however, has not been accepted by the consensus of scholars and critics, since apart from the cited common passages, there is no evidence of Beaumont's or Fletcher's authorship in the play. The common passages appear to be best explained as the type of borrowings sometimes found in works of the era (the borrowings from Thomas North's translation of Plutarch's Parallel Lives in Shakespeare's Antony and Cleopatra, for example) that have no bearing on questions of authorship. Though the dates of authorship for both plays are uncertain, it seems likely that Cupid's Revenge is the earlier work, and that the author or authors of Merlin borrowed from the Beaumont–Fletcher play.

== Characters ==
- Aurelius – king of Britains
- Uther – prince, brother and heir of Aurelius
- Donobert – a British nobleman
- Constantia and Modestia – daughters of Donobert
- Cador and Edwin – suitors to Constantia and Modestia
- Artesia – a Saxon princess and chief ambassador, later Aurelius' queen-consort
- Edol – a dissident British courtier and enemy of Vortigern
- a Christian British Hermit
- Joan Go-to't – an unwed, pregnant, British commoner
- a fat Clown – Joan's loyal brother
- a Devil – poorly disguised as a courtier, and father of Joan's child
- Lucina – a pagan goddess
- the Fates – three pagan goddesses
- Merlin – full-grown child born to Joan in the middle of the play
- Vortigern – a king in Wales and a Saxon ally
- Saxon emissaries, later courtiers – among them a pagan priest-magician
- British courtiers
- Welsh courtiers

== Synopsis ==
The Birth of Merlin possesses a three-level plot, a structure common in plays of its era.

- The main plot has royal characters concerned with statecraft and national welfare.
- The subplot has aristocratic and genteel characters concerned with personal values and personal fulfilment.
- The comic subplot has common characters whose concerns are largely sensual.

The play is rich with visual effects of varying types, including gods and devils, magic, and masque-like spectacles. It was clearly designed to provide broad, colourful, fast-paced entertainment, rather than to reflect on real-world life.

=== Opening ===
Unusually, the play is staged to begin on its second level: The opening scene introduces the nobleman Donobert, his daughters Constantia and Modestia, and their suitors Cador and Edwin, and begins the story of Modestia's conflict between her desire for a religious vocation versus social pressures to marry. The famous characters of Arthurian romance do not appear until the second scene, which introduces King Aurelius and his royal court. The British are flush with a recent victory over the invading Saxons, though they are troubled by the absence of the king's missing brother, Uther.

Saxon emissaries arrive at court to negotiate a peace; they are led by the Saxon princess Artesia. Aurelius instantly falls in love with Artesia, and in his infatuation grants the Saxons very generous peace terms, despite the objections of his courtiers and the criticism of a holy hermit who interjects his own opposition. (Before the scene ends, Modestia consults the Hermit about her personal spiritual difficulty.)

=== The forest ===
The first scene in Act II introduces the otherwise-unnamed Clown and his very pregnant sister, Joan Go-to't. References through the play identify the fat Clown as a type-role that Rowley repeatedly wrote into the play for himself. The Clown's sister has gotten pregnant by yielding to the advances of a mysterious stranger; she and the Clown are now wandering through the forest, searching for the father of the child, or at least a father for the child.

Sister and brother – Joan and the Clown – stumble upon Prince Uther wandering through the same forest, distracted and disconsolate after having caught sight of a woman with whom he instantly fell in love. Overhearing this, the Clown solicits Uther as a potential husband for Joan, much to the prince's outrage. As he beats them, their cries are heard by courtiers searching for the prince, who interrupt the scene and carry Uther back to court. The Clown and Joan are left to continue their search.

=== Back at court ===
At court, Aurelius's infatuation with Artesia has led to a sudden marriage. One British noble, Edol, is so outraged that he flees the court to nourish his opposition. The court now blends British and Saxon influences, though not smoothly or happily. The Hermit has a contest of power with a Saxon magician; the Christian Hermit triumphs over pagan magic. Prince Uther enters, and sees that the woman who has caused his distraction is now his brother's wife and the new British queen. Aurelius recognises the situation, and withdraws in anger and jealousy.

In Act III, the Clown and Joan have reached the court in their search for her child's father. They confront various courtiers, with comically unsuccessful results. Finally, though, they encounter the actual father: Though Joan sees him as a handsome courtier, the Clown can recognise him for the devil, "his feet and head horrid". Joan pursues him, and the Clown loyally follows her. In the second-level plot, Modestia embraces her religious vocation; in a familial confrontation, Modestia's defence of her choice is so persuasive that her sister Constantia is converted to the spiritual life and rejects her suitor, just as Modestia has done. Donobert is outraged, but urges Cador and Edwin not to give up on his daughters yet.

=== Back in the forest and the birth of Merlin ===
In a cave in a forest, the Devil summons Lucina and the Fates to attend Joan as she gives birth to Merlin. The Clown catches up, to meet his sister and his new-born nephew, a fully grown Merlin the Magician. Merlin introduces his Clown-uncle to his Devil-father; the Devil predicts a dramatic future for his newborn son. In the British court, the Saxons are plotting treason; Artesia manipulates Uther's romantic interest and Aurelius's jealousy to bring about a fissure between the two, though her plans are partially frustrated by the British nobles. The two factions separate and prepare for war.

Meanwhile, Merlin, Joan, and the Clown have made their way to Wales, where King Vortigern, a Saxon ally, is having trouble building a castle. To keep the edifice from continual collapse, the Welsh must sacrifice a "fiend-begotten child"; therefore they are pleased and relieved when Merlin appears. Merlin, however, foretells Vortigern's imminent defeat at the hands of Edol and the British. A series of battle scenes portray Edol's victory, culminating in a spectacular special-effect scene in which Merlin prophesies on a blazing comet.

=== Dénouement ===
Act V provides a swift wind-up of the various plots. Merlin seals his devil-father within the earth, and leads his mother away to a life of repentance. Donobert accepts his daughters' religious commitment to the solitary and celibate life. The British defeat the treacherous Saxons, who have assassinated Aurelius. Uther is now the British king, aided by Merlin.
