= William Rowley =

English actor and playwright (c. 1585–1626)

William Rowley (c. 1585 – February 1626) was an English Jacobean dramatist, best known for works written in collaboration with more successful writers. His date of birth is estimated to have been c. 1585; he was buried on 11 February 1626 in the graveyard of St James's, Clerkenwell, in north London. (An unambiguous record of Rowley's death was discovered in 1928, but some authorities persist in listing his year of death as 1642.)

== Life and work ==
Rowley was an actor-playwright who specialised in playing clown characters (that is, characters whose function is to provide low comedy). He must also have been a large man, since his forte lay specifically in fat-clown roles. He played the Fat Bishop in Thomas Middleton's A Game at Chess, and Plumporridge in the same author's Inner Temple Masque. He also wrote fat-clown parts for himself to play: Jaques in All's Lost by Lust (a role "personated by the Poet", the 1633 quarto states), and Bustopha in The Maid in the Mill, his collaboration with John Fletcher. He certainly played Simplicity in The World Tossed at Tennis, and probably Chough in A Fair Quarrel – and given that these are Middleton/Rowley collaborations, they would appear to be two more parts that Rowley wrote for himself. (Internal evidence shows that in collaborations, Rowley normally handled the comic subplot – though he was not restricted solely to comic material: in The Changeling, A Fair Quarrel, and The Maid in the Mill he wrote substantial portions of the main plots as well.) The part of the otherwise unnamed Clown in The Birth of Merlin shows signs of being another role that Rowley the playwright wrote with Rowley the actor in mind.

As a writer, Rowley was almost exclusively a dramatist; the pamphlet A Search for Money (1609) is his only sustained work of non-dramatic prose. Two plays are generally accepted as Rowley's solo works: A Shoemaker a Gentleman (c. 1607–09) and All's Lost by Lust (1619). Three other works that may have been Rowley solo plays have not survived: Hymen's Holidays or Cupid's Vagaries (1612), A Knave in Print (1613) and The Fool Without Book (also 1613).

Rowley appears to have begun his career working for Queen Anne's Men at the Red Bull Theatre. In 1609 he was part of a group of actors who set up a new playing company, the Duke of York's Men, which became known as Prince Charles's Men after 1612. Most of Rowley's career was spent writing and clowning for this company, which was based at a series of different playhouses, including the Curtain, the Hope and the Red Bull. Rowley was the troupe's payee for their Court performances in the 1610–15 era.

In 1623, Rowley left his company and joined the highly successful King's Men at the Globe, until his death in 1626. Though relatively brief, his stay with the troupe was eventful: in 1624 he was embroiled in both the Game at Chess controversy in August and the Spanish Viceroy affair in December. The roles he took with the company probably included Cacafogo in Rule a Wife and Have a Wife, the Cook in Rollo Duke of Normandy and Tony in A Wife for a Month.

Notably, Rowley did not necessarily restrict his playwriting efforts to the company to which he was committed as an actor. In 1624 he was a member of the King's Men, Shakespeare's famous company, and in August of that year played in their notorious production of A Game at Chess – yet in the same year he worked on the now-lost play Keep the Widow Waking with Dekker, Ford and Webster, which was intended for the Red Bull Theatre.

== Plays by Rowley ==
Rowley's canon is plagued by uncertainty and by the complexities of collaboration: the following is only an approximate guide.

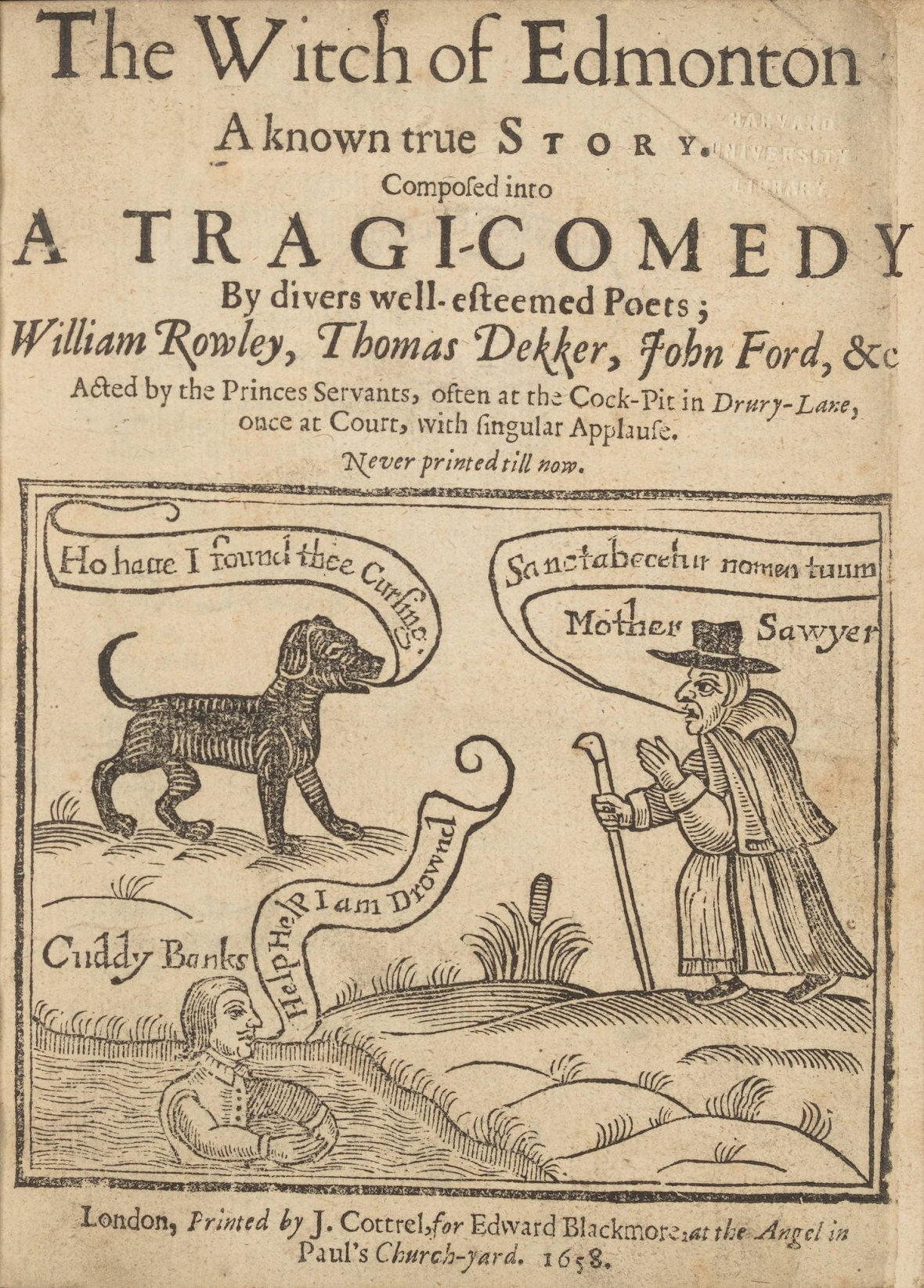
The Witch of Edmonton, 1658

- The Travels of the Three English Brothers (performed and printed 1607). Co-written with George Wilkins and John Day.
- Fortune by Land and Sea (performed c. 1607; printed 1655). Co-written with Thomas Heywood.
- A New Wonder, a Woman Never Vexed (performed 1610–14; printed 1632). Possibly a collaboration; George Wilkins and Thomas Heywood have been suggested as co-writers.
- Wit at Several Weapons (performed c. 1615; printed 1647). Although it was first printed as part of the Beaumont and Fletcher folio, stylistic analysis suggests that this play was heavily revised by Rowley and Thomas Middleton.
- A Fair Quarrel (performed 1614–17; printed 1617). Co-written with Thomas Middleton.
- A Shoemaker a Gentleman (performed c. 1608–18; printed 1638)
- The Old Law, or A New Way to Please You (performed 1618; printed 1656). Co-written with Thomas Middleton, and, possibly, a third collaborator who may have been Philip Massinger or Thomas Heywood.
- All's Lost by Lust (performed 1618–19; printed 1633)
- The World Tossed at Tennis (performed and printed 1620). Co-written with Thomas Middleton.
- The Witch of Edmonton (performed 1621; published 1658). Co-written with John Ford and Thomas Dekker.
- A Match at Midnight (performed c. 1622; printed 1633). Attributed only to 'W. R.', and stylistic analysis suggests that it may not be by Rowley.
- The Changeling (performed 1622; printed 1653). Co-written with Thomas Middleton.
- The Birth of Merlin; or, The Child Hath Found its Father (performed 1622; printed 1662). The title page claims William Shakespeare as Rowley's co-writer, but this claim is disputed.
- The Maid in the Mill (performed 1623; printed 1647). Co-written with John Fletcher.
- The Spanish Gypsy (performed 1623; printed 1653). Although the title page attributes this play to Rowley and Thomas Middleton, stylistic analysis favours a different playwriting team: John Ford and Thomas Dekker.
- A Cure for a Cuckold (performed 1624; printed 1661). Co-written with John Webster.
- The Thracian Wonder (date of composition unknown; printed 1661). The title page attributes this play to Rowley and John Webster although few readers accept Webster's presence.
