= Edward Allde =

English printer (c. 1560–1827)

- Born: between 1555 and 1562
- Died: between 27 August and 3 September 1627
- Occupation: Printer

Edward Allde (Alde, Alldee, or Alday; born c. 1560, died 1627) was an English printer in London during the Elizabethan and Jacobean eras. He was responsible for a number of significant texts in English Renaissance drama, including some of the early editions of plays by William Shakespeare.

== Life ==
Edward Allde was part of a family of professional printers: his father John, his mother Margaret, his widow Elizabeth, and two of her children all worked in the trade. Edward Allde took over the business of his father on the elder Allde's death in 1584; he became a "freeman" (a full member) of the Stationers Company in February of that year, "by patrimony." The son continued his father's practices and publications; John Allde, for example, had issued the undated first quarto of Thomas Preston's play Cambyses sometime before 1584; Edward Allde issued the undated second quarto of the same play, sometime after 1584. The elder Allde published the first edition of Ulpian Fulwell's Like Will to Like in 1568; the younger Allde published the second edition in 1587.

At first, Edward ran his late father's business with the help of his mother; it was located at the Long Shop in the Poultry, adjoining St. Mildred's Church (and four doors away from a London prison, the Poultry Counter; the prison's stocks were outside the Allde shop door). In 1593, Edward moved into his own establishment, at the sign of the Gilded Cup in Fore Street, Cripplegate, near the Barbican; Margaret Allde continued the Long Shop operation on her own, at least until 1601.

John Allde had maintained a flourishing business, with as many as eight apprentices simultaneously; Anthony Munday had been one of them for a time, and Edward Allde served his own apprenticeship under his father. Edward also succeeded in business, keeping his two presses busy with chapbooks, playbooks, and more serious books too. He produced ballads, songbooks, and jestbooks, and was one of the "original innovators of the merry book trade;" in the years when the Stationer's Company limited ballad printing to only five of its members (1612–20), Allde was one of the five. Toward the end of his career, in the early 1620s, Allde was involved in the syndicate that produced the first English newspapers, along with Nathaniel Butter, Thomas Archer, Nicholas Bourne, William Sheffard and Bartholomew Downes.

While his output was massive and significant, Allde's craftsmanship has not been rated highly by modern scholars, critics, and bibliographers. In the succinct verdict of one commentator, "his work was poor."

It was not unusual, in this period, for stationers to run into difficulties with the authorities, both those of their guild and the higher civil administration; most were fined for infractions large and small, and some, like Butter, Archer, Nicholas Okes, and William Stansby, were imprisoned. John Allde spent time in the Poultry Compter in 1568 for printing a pro-Catholic text. (Both the Tudor and Stuart regimes were serious about censorship and control of the press.) Edward Allde ran into the same types of troubles in his career: he was fined for printing unregistered works and works to which he did not own the copyright; his presses were shut down twice, and he was once sent to prison by the Secretary of State. In 1623, he admitted to Company officials to "behaving my self turbulently and disorderly...and using unseemly and unfitting words...."

== Shakespeare ==
Edward Allde printed key texts of the original Shakespearean bibliography:

- Part of the first quarto, the "bad quarto," of Romeo and Juliet (1597), for publisher Cuthbert Burby.
- The third quarto of Titus Andronicus (1611), for Edward White.
- The second edition of Robert Chester's Love's Martyr (1611), which contained Shakespeare's The Phoenix and the Turtle, for Matthew Lownes. (Lownes re-titled the book The Annuals of Great Britain.)

Allde shared the printing of Romeo and Juliet Q1 with colleague John Danter, apparently with the goal of a speedy result. Danter printed sheets A through D, while Allde printed sheets E through K. Only Danter, however, is credited on the volume's title page. Bibliographers determined Allde's participation in Romeo and Juliet in part by tracking damaged type used in Allde's E-K sheets and in three books that he printed in the 1597–9 period.

== Others ==
Beyond the limits of the Shakespearean canon, Edward Allde printed important first editions of plays:

- Thomas Kyd's The Spanish Tragedy (undated; 1592?), for Edward White;
- Christopher Marlowe's The Massacre at Paris (undated; 1594?), again for White;
- George Peele's The Battle of Alcazar (1594), for Richard Bankworth;
- the first and second editions of Samuel Daniel's Cleopatra (1594, 1595) conjointly with printer James Roberts, for publisher Simon Waterson;
- the first two editions of the anonymous Soliman and Persida (both 1599), again for White;
- Thomas Dekker's Satiromastix (1602), yet again for White;
- Daniel's masque The Vision of the Twelve Goddesses (1604);
- Edward Sharpham's Cupid's Whirligig (1607), for Arthur Johnson;
- Thomas Middleton's The Phoenix (1607), for Arthur Johnson;
- the anonymous Every Woman in Her Humour (1609), for Thomas Archer;
- John Mason's The Turk (1610), for John Busby;
- Philip Massinger's The Bondman (1624), for John Harrison and Edward Blackmore;

—; among others. (Allde's habit of issuing undated books has been a nuisance for modern scholars.) Allde naturally printed plays in other than first editions too —; like the second edition of Norton and Sackville's Gorboduc (1590), for John Perrin, and a 1606 edition of Marlowe's Tamburlaine, Part 2 for Edward White. Allde maintained a long-term professional relationship with bookseller White, and printed a number of dramatic and non-dramatic works for him over the course of their careers.

Of course, Allde also printed a wide variety of non-dramatic works of virtually all types then in circulation. He worked on a few of the pamphlets of Samuel Rowlands, including The Knave of Clubs (1611) and the evocatively-titled Look to It for I'll Stab Ye (1604). Allde printed topical works like Henry Petowe's Elizabetha Quasi Vivens: Eliza's Funeral (1603), an item in the mourning literature for Queen Elizabeth I. For Cuthbert Burby, Allde printed the sixth volume of The Mirror of Knighthood (1598), the vast, and vastly popular, chivalric romance that was one of the greatest best-sellers of the age. For John Tappe, he printed an early attempt at juvenile literature, Nicholas Breton's The Passionate Shepherd...With many excellent conceited Poems and pleasant Sonnets, fit for young heads to pass away idle hours (1604).

Among musical works he printed was John Amner's Sacred Hymnes of 3, 4, 5 and 6 parts for Voyces and Vyols (1615). He also printed the Thomas Ravenscroft's A Briefe Discourse (1614), a music theory treatise. Though his name appeared on a list of those granted monopolies to print set songs under James I, he seems to have used this privilege seldom.

== Publishing ==
Like most printers of his era, Edward Allde concentrated on printing, and left publishing decisions to the booksellers who commissioned printers to print books. Yet again like most printers of his era, Allde did a certain amount of publishing himself; the editions of Cambyses, Like Will to Like, and The Vision of the Twelve Goddesses mentioned above are examples. As with his printing, Allde published a range of works of various types: he issued the tracts and pamphlets that were so common in his period, like the third edition of William Baldwin's Beware the Cat (1584); and he published serious works, like a Latin vocabulary by John Posselius (1623).

Printers who published usually had to arrange with booksellers for the retail distribution of their products. Allde's edition of Richard Rich's News from Virginia: The Lost Flock Triumphant (1610) reads "to be sold by John Wright" on its title page. Allde's 1607 edition of Gervase Markham's The English Arcadia was sold by Henry Rocket.

== Wife ==
Allde's widow Elizabeth continued his business from his 1628 death until 1633. Since both Elizabeth and Edward Allde identified themselves on title pages as "E. A." or "E. Allde," 19th-century scholars sometimes confused their works.

Her most significant work in drama may be the first quarto of Thomas Dekker's The Honest Whore, Part 2 (1630), which she printed for Nathaniel Butter. She printed the third edition of the anonymous comedy Wily Beguiled (1630) for Thomas Knight. Elizabeth Allde published and printed the second edition of Robert Greene's Friar Bacon and Friar Bungay (1630) and the third edition of Arden of Faversham (1633), one of the plays of the Shakespeare Apocrypha.

Elizabeth Allde also produced non-dramatic works. Some examples: she printed William Prynne's Anti-Arminianism (1630) for Michael Sparke, and Clement Cotton's The Mirror of Martyrs (1631) for Robert Allot. She published and printed a collection of the works of Sallust (1629), and Thomas Chaffinger's The Just Man's Memorial (1630). She was one of the four printers who worked on the 1630 collected edition of the works of John Taylor the Water Poet for publisher James Boler. And she also printed ballads, as her husband had done.

In 1633, the Allde firm passed to Richard Oulton (or Olton), Elizabeth's son-in-law. Oulton maintained his business, in Newgate Street near Christ Church, until 1643.
