= Allde =

Allde is a surname. Notable people with the surname include:

- Edward Allde (died 1628), English printer
- John Allde (fl. 1555–1592), Scottish stationer and printer
