= The Insatiate Countess =

1613 play by John Marston

The Insatiate Countess is an early Jacobean era stage play, a tragedy first published in 1613. The play is a problematic element in John Marston's dramatic canon.

== Publication ==
The Insatiate Countess was first printed in 1613, in a quarto issued by the bookseller Thomas Archer. The title page attributes the play's authorship to Marston. A second quarto appeared, in 1613 or 1614, without Marston's name, perhaps to avoid legal difficulties. (Marston left dramatic authorship after 1608, and apparently tried to minimise public acknowledgement of his earlier playwriting phase; his name was removed even from the 1633 collected edition of his plays.) A third quarto was published by bookseller Hugh Perrie in 1631; one surviving copy of this third quarto assigned authorship not to Marston but to actor and poet William Barkstead. One copy of the 1613 first quarto has a cancelled title page that links Lewis Machin's name with Barkstead's.

== Performance ==
The title page of the 1613 quarto states that the drama was performed at the Whitefriars Theatre — which indicates the Children of the Queen's Revels as the company that staged it. The date of first production is uncertain, and is generally assigned to the period c. 1610.

A Restoration novelization of The Insatiate Countess, which featured the plot of that play alongside several other stories, was published with the title God's Revenge Against the Abominable Sin of Adultery, in 1679.

== Authorship ==
Modern scholarship generally regards the play as a composite work. The play's text shows a range of commonalities with Barkstead's two non-dramatic narrative poems, Myrrha (published 1607) and Hiren (1611). Critics have not agreed on the nature of Marston's connection. Some have argued that Marston started the play, but left it unfinished when he encountered his second bout of legal troubles in 1607 and 1608, and that Barkstead and Machin later completed the script. Others have suggested that Marston's contribution is concentrated in the comic subplot.

Little is known of Barkstead, and even less of Machin. Barkstead (or Barksted, Barksteed, Backstead, etc.) was an actor with several companies, including the Lady Elizabeth's Men and Prince Charles's Men, in the 1607–16 period, as well as a poet. Machin collaborated with Gervase Markham on The Dumb Knight (1608), and probably was the "L. M." who contributed eclogues to Barkstead's Myrrha.

In his analysis of the play's text, modern editor Giorgio Melchiori sees Act I, the beginning of Act II, and portions of Act V scene i as the remains of Marston's original authorship, though reworked by Barkstead and Machin, while the rest of Act II and Acts III and IV constitute little Marston and mostly Barkstead/Machin. The final scene, V, ii, is a makeshift ending tacked on by an "unscrupulous hack", to turn a defective play text into publishable form.

Conversely, David Lake has argued against Marston's presence, and Martin Wiggins assigns the play to Barkstead and Machin in his 1988 edition. Darren Freebury-Jones, Marina Tarlinskaja, and Marcus Dahl argue that Barkstead and Machin revised and completed a play originally written by Marston.

== Sources ==
The title character of the Insatiate Countess, Isabella Countess of "Swevia" (Swabia), is based on Bianca Maria, the Countess of Challant who was executed for adultery on 20 October 1526. (Marston also based his Franceschina in The Dutch Courtesan on Bianca Maria.) An account of Bianca Maria's life and death was included by Matteo Bandello in his 1554 Novelle collection. François de Belleforest translated Bandello's account into French in 1565, which in turn appeared in English as the 24th story in William Painter's Palace of Pleasure (1567).

== Critical responses ==
The critical response to The Insatiate Countess has compared and contrasted the sexual morality of the play with Marston's other works. The play's richness in female characterisation, with four prominent women's roles, has also been noted.

== Dramatis personae ==
- Isabella, Countess of Swevia
- Lady Lentulus, a widow
- Abigail, wife to Clardiana
- Thais, wife to Rogero
- Anna, waiting woman to Isabella
- Amago, Duke of Venice
- Duke of Medina
- Roberto, Count of Cyprus
- Count Massino
- Guido, Count of Arsena
- Gnaica, Count of Gazia
- Mendoza Foscari, nephew to Amago
- Signior Mizaldus
- Clardiana
- Rogero
- Don Sago, a Spanish Colonel
- Cardinal
- Senators, captain, lieutenant, soldiers, messengers, executioner etc.

== Synopsis ==
As the play opens, Countess Isabella is at her house in Venice, where she observes the customary period of mourning for her recently deceased husband Viscount Hermus. Her state of mind is far removed from what society expects: instead of grieving over her husband's death, she wishes he had died much sooner. She quickly strikes up a new romance with Roberto, the Count of Cyprus; they violate mourning with a sudden marriage.

A masque is staged at their wedding feast – and the wanton Countess is attracted to one of the dancers in the masque, Count Massino. She writes him a love letter; they meet and quickly flee together to Pavia. There, Isabella meets Massino's friend Gnaica, the Count of Gazia, and just as precipitously she conceives a passion for him. Gnaica resists her advances at first, unwilling to betray his friend; but the Countess's appeal soon overwhelms his scruples. Massino returns from hunting, only to be denied admission to Isabella's presence. He denounces her uncontrolled lust in satiric verses; she, outraged, solicits Gnaica to kill Massino. The two meet and duel – but soon find that their hearts aren't in the matter. They talk over the situation, and part amicably.

Isabella is even more outraged by this, and determines to work the deaths of both men. A Spanish colonel named Don Sago falls in love with her on first sight; she uses him to kill Count Massino. Sago is captured and brought before the Duke of Medina; he confesses fully. As a result, Isabella is condemned to death. Her husband Count Roberto, disguised as a friar, visits her on the scaffold, to offer her his forgiveness and bid her a final farewell.

Isabella's lustful career is contrasted with the three virtuous women of the play's subplot. Two foolish citizens, Rogero and Clardiana, are determined to continue a family feud begun by their grandfathers; even on their mutual wedding day, the two quarrel in the street. Their new brides, Thais and Abigail, are old friends, and decide to teach their silly husbands a lesson. The two men are not brave enough to fight an actual duel; each tries to gain advantage on his rival by seducing the rival's wife. Thais and Abigail use this circumstance to stage a doubled version of the bed trick that is so common in English Renaissance drama. Both Rogero and Clardiana have sex with their own wives, each mistakenly thinking that he is a successful seducer.

Meanwhile, the virtuous widow Lady Lentulus is being pursued by her own would-be seducer, Mendoza Foscari, nephew of Duke Amago of Venice. When Mendoza tries to climb to the widow's balcony, his rope ladder breaks under him. Mendoza is injured in the fall; he crawls away from the Lady's house, and is apprehended by the night watch. The watch assume that the Duke's nephew has been assaulted, and scour the city for suspects; they find Clardiana and Rogero in each other's houses, and arrest them both. The two silly men are ready to be wrongfully condemned, rather than admit publicly that they've been cuckolded (as they now believe); Mendoza, wanting to spare Lady Lentulus dishonor, claims that he was climbing to her apartment to steal her jewels.

The exasperated Duke sentences all three men to death, hoping that the move will shock someone into telling the truth. On the day appointed for the executions, Abigail and Thais come forward to explain the double bed trick; their husbands, now realising that they are not cuckolds, retract their confessions and are released. (Mendoza's part of the story is never resolved.)
