= St Peter's Church, Laneham =

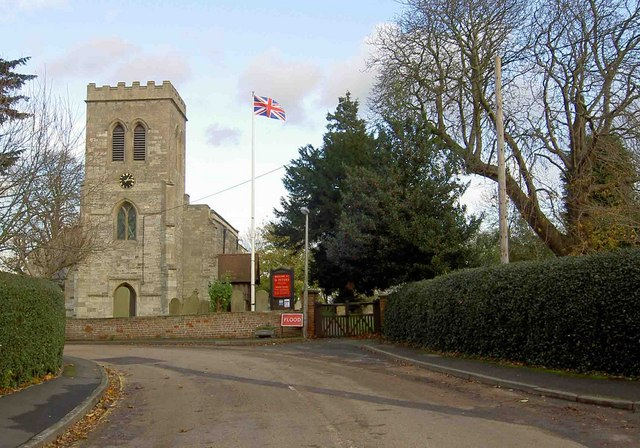
- St Peter's Church, Laneham
- St Peter's Church, Laneham
- 53°16′46.51″N 0°46′45.99″W
- OS grid reference: SK 81482 76570
- Location: Laneham
- Country: England
- Denomination: Church of England

History
- Dedication: St Peter

Architecture
- Heritage designation: Grade I listed

Administration
- Diocese: Diocese of Southwell and Nottingham
- Archdeaconry: Newark
- Deanery: Bassetlaw and Bawtry
- Parish: Laneham

St Peter's Church, Laneham is a Grade I listed parish church in the Church of England in Laneham, Nottinghamshire, England.

== History ==
Various parts were constructed in the 12th, 13th, 14th and 15th centuries. It was restored in 1891, and the porch was renovated in 1932. The church is the focal point of Church Laneham, it is built on a small knoll above the river and contains a large, elaborate alabaster memorial to Ellis Markham and his son Jervase, which dates from 1636.

== See also ==
- Grade I listed buildings in Nottinghamshire
- Listed buildings in Laneham
