= Listed buildings in Laneham =

Laneham is a civil parish in the Bassetlaw District of Nottinghamshire, England. The parish contains ten listed buildings that are recorded in the National Heritage List for England. Of these, one is listed at Grade I, the highest of the three grades, and the others are at Grade II, the lowest grade. The parish contains the village of Laneham, the hamlet of Church Laneham, and the surrounding countryside. The listed buildings are a church, houses, cottages and associated structures, farmhouses and farm buildings, a warehouse and a war memorial.

== Key ==
Grade	Criteria
I	Buildings of exceptional interest, sometimes considered to be internationally important
II	Buildings of national importance and special interest

== Buildings ==
Name and location	Photograph	Date	Notes	Grade
St Peter's Church; 53.27987°N 0.77942°W		12th century	The church has been altered and extended through the centuries, including a restoration in 1890–91. It is in stone with lead roofs, and consists of a nave, a north aisle, a south porch, a chancel, and a west tower. The oldest part of the church is the tower, with diagonal buttresses, a west doorway with a pointed head, a double chamfered surround and a hood mould, above which is a two-light window with a pointed arch and a hood mould, a clock face, two-light bell openings, and an embattled parapet. The porch, which was rebuilt in 1932 is timber framed, and gabled with decorative bargeboards, and the inner doorway is Norman with a moulded surround and colonnettes.	I
Willow Tree Farmhouse; 53.27763°N 0.79119°W	—	Early 17th century	The farmhouse which was extended in the 19th century is in red brick, partly rendered, with a pantile roof. The original range has two storeys and attics and three bays, and the rear extension has two storeys and two bays. The windows are horizontally-sliding sashes under segmental arches.	II
Outbuildings east of Endon House; 53.27716°N 0.79650°W	—	Late 17th century	The outbuildings are in red brick with pantile roofs. They include a former smithy with a single story and a loft, and five bays. Attached to the left is a 19th-century range with four bays, and to the right is a two-storey four-bay stable block.	II
Binge Farmhouse; 53.27695°N 0.79503°W		Mid 18th century	The farmhouse is in red brick, partly on a plinth, with a moulded floor band, dogtooth and dentilled eaves, and a pantile roof with coped and tumbled gables. There are two storeys, attics and a basement, and an L-shaped plan, with a main range of five bays, and a rear wing. The central doorway has a fanlight, there are two blocked basement windows with segmental heads, and the other windows are casements. The ground floor openings have flush wedge lintels.	II
Willow Tree Cottage and outbuilding 53.27758°N 0.79145°W		Mid 18th century	The cottage and outbuilding are in red brick with dentilled eaves and pantile roofs. The cottage has a single storey and attics, three bays, and the left gable has brick coping. In the centre is a doorway, the windows are horizontally-sliding sashes under segmental arches, and in the roof is a gabled dormer. To the right is a taller outbuilding containing a doorway with a segmental head.	II
The Croft and walls 53.27685°N 0.79543°W		Late 18th century	The house is in red brick with a floor band, dentilled eaves and a pantile roof. There are two storeys and attics, and three bays. The central doorway has a ribbed surround and a fanlight, and the windows are sashes with segmental heads. To the rear of the house is a red brick wall with stone coping that meets a square brick pier with a pyramidal stone coping.	II
Manor Farmhouse and wall 53.27934°N 0.77945°W	—	Early 19th century	The farmhouse is rendered and has a pantile roof. There are two storeys, three bays, and lower rear extensions. The central doorway has a reeded surround, paterae, a fanlight and a dentilled cornice, and the windows are sashes. Attached to the house is a low brick wall with stone coping, and iron railings with decorative finials, containing a gateway with decorative iron piers.	II
Barn, The Croft; 53.27667°N 0.79518°W		Early 19th century	The barn is in brick and stone, with dogtooth eaves, and a hipped pantile roof. It contains a large central doorway with an elliptical arch, and to the right is a smaller doorway with a segmental arch.	II
Warehouse, Frogs Leap; 53.28545°N 0.77784°W	—	Mid 19th century	The warehouse is in brick with dogtooth eaves and a hipped pantile roof. There are three storeys and five bays. In the middle floor is a doorway with marginal lights, flanked by casement windows under segmental arches, and the top floor contains a doorway and fixed lights.	II
War Memorial, wall and railings 53.27763°N 0.79206°W		1922	The war memorial stands in an enclosure by a road junction. It is in Scottish granite, it is 2 metres (6 ft 7 in) high, and consists of an obelisk with a flared plinth on a two-stage base. On the base is an inscription, and the names of those lost in the First World War. At the rear of the enclosure is a whitewashed coped wall, and at the front are iron railings and a gate.	II
