= King's Revels Children =

The King's Revels Children or Children of the King's Revels were a troupe of actors, or playing company, in Jacobean era London, active in the 1607-9 period. They were part of a fashion for child actors that peaked in the first decade of the seventeenth century, with the Children of Paul's and the Children of the Chapel.

The King's Revels Children are sometimes called the King's Revels Company, though this title leaves them liable to be confused with a similarly named troupe, primarily of adult actors, most active in the years around 1630. To avoid this confusion, some scholars prefer to identify the early company specifically as a company of children, and to call the later group the King's Revels Men.

The King's Revels Children were founded in 1607 by a partnership between the poet and playwright Michael Drayton and Thomas Woodford, nephew of the playwright Thomas Lodge, who later sold shares in the enterprise and took on other partners. The boys acted at the Whitefriars Theatre in London (Woodford was one of the theatre's leaseholders), performing the same type of repertory as the other child companies of the day. The Children of Paul's had ceased active dramatic performance a year earlier, in 1606; some scholars have theorized that the King's Revels Children absorbed some personnel from the Children of Paul's, though this cannot be said with certainty. William Barkstead, a playwright, poet, and actor who later worked with the Lady Elizabeth's Men and Prince Charles's Men, may have begun his career as a boy actor with the King's Revels Children.

The company seems to have run into financial problems quite early in its existence, with the result that its plays were sold off to printers —; something that theatre companies of the era generally avoided, since publication diminished the unique value of their basic assets, their plays. The company's financial state worsened, and it collapsed in litigation among its investors by 1609.

Despite its short life, the King's Revels Children acquired an interesting repertory of plays in their active years. The plays below were published as having been acted by the King's Revels Children; they are listed with year of first publication, and date of entry into the Stationers' Register where available.

- Cupid's Whirligig, Edward Sharpham; licensed 29 June 1607; printed 1607
- The Family of Love, Lording Barry; 12 October 1607; 1608
- Humour Out of Breath, John Day; 12 April 1608; 1608
- The Dumb Knight, Gervase Markham and Lewis Machin; 6 October 1608; 1608
- Every Woman in Her Humour, Lewis Machin?; 1609
- The Two Maids of Moreclack, Robert Armin; 1609
- The Turk, John Mason; 10 March 1609; 1610
- Ram Alley, Lording Barry; 9 November 1610; 1611.

Day's Humour Out of Breath contains a possible allusion to Shakespeare's Timon of Athens that helps to date the latter play.

== See also ==
- English Renaissance theatre
