= Lewis Machin =

English poet and playwright

Lewis Machin (fl. 1607–09) was an English poet and playwright in the early 17th century. He may have worked with Gervase Markham on the play The Dumb Knight around 1601, although it is now argued that instead Machin revised Markham's original around 1608-09.

In 1607 "certaine Eglogs" by "L.M" were appended to actor-playwright William Barksted's poem Mirrha the Mother of Adonis, and Machin contributed a commendatory verse as well. Around the same time Machin worked with Barksted to revise and complete John Marston's The Insatiate Countess for the short-lived Children of the King's Revels at the Whitefriars Theatre. It has also been suggested that Machin is the author of another of that company's plays, Every Woman In Her Humour (1609).
