= Cupid's Whirligig =

City comedy by Edward Sharpham

Cupid's Whirligig, by Edward Sharpham (1576-1608), is a city comedy set in London about a husband that suspects his wife of having affairs with other men and is consumed with irrational jealousy. It was first published in quarto in 1607, entered in the Stationer's Register with the name "A Comedie called Cupids Whirlegigge." It was performed that year by the Children of the King's Revels in the Whitefriars Theatre (a private theatre) where Ben Jonson's Epicene was also said to have been performed.

It was again published in 1611, 1616 and 1630, each with an epistle to Robert Hayman before the play, however, the only other record of it being performed is an amateur performance by apprentices at Oxford on 26 December 1631. Its authorship was not known until 1812, when scholars connected it to Edward Sharpham's other play, The Fleire, written on 13 May 1606.

== Character List ==
- Sir Timothy Troublesome - A jealous Knight
- The Lady Troublesome - The jealous Knight’s wife
- The Young Lord Nonsuch - a Begging Soldier, Slacke, a Swaggering Captain
- Old Lord Nonsuch
- Alderman Venter - A Merchant
- Master Correction - The Pedant
- Mistress Correction - The Midwife
- Peg - The Lady Troublesome’s Kinswoman
- Nan - Old Venters Daughter
- Nucome - The Welch Courtier
- Boy - Nucomes Page
- The four Scholars
- Master Exhibition - The Innes-a-court man
- Wages – a servant to Sir Troublesome

== Synopsis ==
=== Acts 1 & 2 ===
Sir Troublesome, overcome with jealousy, suspects that his wife is cheating on him, so he devises a plan to geld (castrate) himself and see if his wife gets pregnant. Distraught Lady Troublesome claims that she is innocent. Young Lord Nonsuch is in love with Lady Troublesome and sends her a love-letter saying that he will come visit her that evening; the Lady shows her husband the letter and together they hatch a plan to catch him and save her reputation. That night, Young Nonsuch arrives disguised as a servant; Sir Troublesome does not recognize him and bribes him to stand guard alone with his wife. A happy Nonsuch takes this opportunity to try and sleep with Lady Troublesome, but she rejects him and sends him away. Sir Troublesome recognizes his signet ring too late as he leaves, and he proceeds to call his wife a bunch of names before leaving to geld himself.

=== Acts 3 & 4 ===
In the next act, Nonsuch is disguised as a begging soldier named Slacke and Sir Troublesome unknowingly hires his rival as his own servant. Slacke keeps attempting to seduce the Lady while at the same time whispering to his master to divorce her saying that she is pregnant with some other man's child. Wages notices Slacke's devious plans and steps in to reconcile the Troublesomes by having Sir Troublesome eavesdrop on his wife as she exclaims how she wishes to be reconciled with her husband and that she is not pregnant. All is well, but then before supper, Captain Wouldlie visits Lady Troublesome and attempts to seduce her; her husband comes home to find them, and she pretends she's protecting the Captain from a crazy man with a sword (Master Exhibition), which he believes.

=== Act 5 ===
Act Five starts with Slacke telling Sir Troublesome that it was a lie, Lady Troublesome is indeed sleeping with the Captain. He convinces Sir Troublesome to get a divorce, saying he should marry Peg instead. At this point in the play, Lady Troublesome loves Sir Troublesome who loves Peg who loves Nucome who loves Nan who loves Slacke who loves Lady Troublesome: Cupid's Whirligig. Wages comes up with a plan to have 3 simultaneous weddings where everyone is masked, having the girls swap tokens to deceive their lovers and end up with the "right" partner. The play ends with Lady Troublesome and Sir Troublesome once again married, Peg and Nucome married, Nan and Slacke (Nonsuch) married, and Wages left on his own, unable to marry Mistress Correction (since she already has a husband).

== Motifs ==
=== Cuckoldry ===
The whole play is centered around whether Sir Troublesome is being cuckolded or not. The audience watches him struggle with finding the truth about this matter since he refuses to believe his wife. The question of how to know if you are being cheated on is one that is prevalent throughout the whole text. Sir Troublesome comes up with different schemes, all which fail, in attempts to prove that he is a cuckold. He is so obsessed with the idea that Lady Troublesome once states, "tis such a jealous fool, that if he catch but a Flea in her [my] bed, he will be searching to see if it bee a male or a female, for fear a comes to Cuckold him."

=== Faithfulness ===
Alongside cuckoldry comes faithfulness. During discussions of what makes an ideal woman, faithfulness is a key factor; it is a proof the love they have for their husbands. At the end of the play, Nan's father, Alderman Venter, blesses her marriage to the Young Lord Nonsuch by saying that his blessing is to "make thee both fruitful, and a faithful wife." As mentioned in the section on allusions, Peg uses Penelope, Ulysses' wife, to prove how strong her love is for Nucome. Penelope was famous for her faithfulness, for being the good wife.

== Sources & Allusions ==
=== Sources ===
This play's plot is original, with no major source texts, though the way the Captain escapes is based on a trick from Boccaccio's Decameron. The play shows signs of being hastily constructed, which is probably why it is lesser known than other Renaissance drama.

=== Allusions ===
The characters in Cupid's Whirligig often allude to classical Roman Mythology. Along with Cupid, the god of desire, Venus, the goddess of love, is mentioned multiple times. Nan talks about her love in terms of these gods, saying, "Venus be my good speede, and Cupid send me good lucke, for my heart is very light." Peg also brings up another Roman allusion, her Ulysses, using his story to prove her character. She says. "I will prove as true unto his bed, as ere did she that did Ulysses wed," saying that she will be as faithful as Penelope, Ulysses' wife, who kept all of her suitors at bay during his long absence. Biblical allusions are also present; at one instance, Sir Troublesome mutters, "the plague of Egypt upon you all," referring to the ten plagues God sent on Egypt in order for Pharaoh to let Moses take the Israelites away to the promised land.
