= Laneham =

Village and civil parish in Nottinghamshire, England

Coordinates: 53.2771°N 0.7947°W

- Village and civil parish
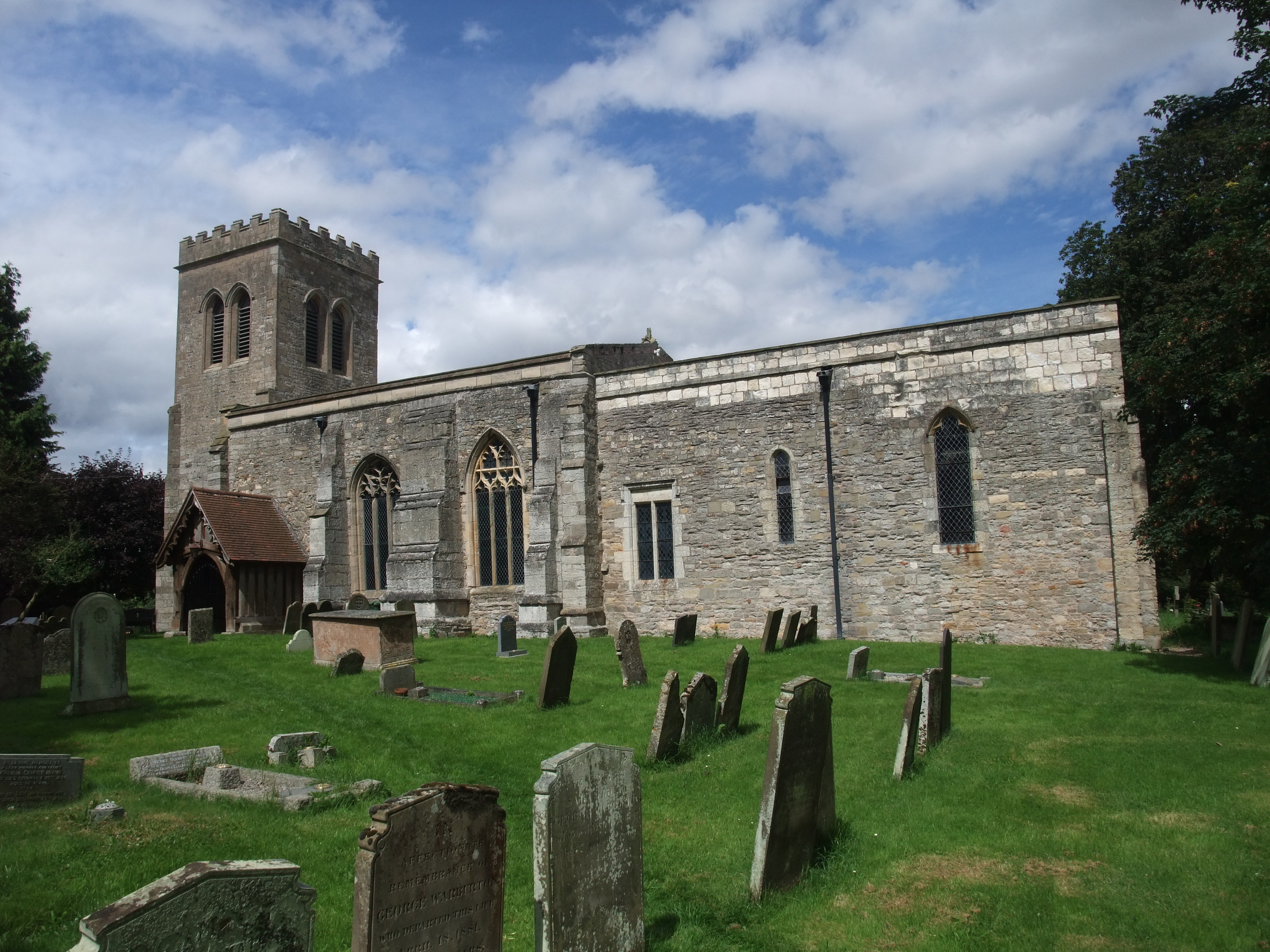
- Church of St Peter ad Vincula, Laneham

- Location within Nottinghamshire
- Interactive map of Laneham
- Area: 2.52 sq mi (6.5 km^{2})
- Population: 392 (2021)
  - Density: 156/sq mi (60/km^{2})
- OS grid reference: SK 804762
  - London: 125 mi (201 km) SE
- District: Bassetlaw
- Shire county: Nottinghamshire
- Region: East Midlands
- Country: England
- Sovereign state: United Kingdom
- Places: Laneham; Church Laneham
- Post town: RETFORD
- Postcode district: DN22
- Dialling code: 01777
- Police: Nottinghamshire
- Fire: Nottinghamshire
- Ambulance: East Midlands
- UK Parliament: Newark
- Website: www.laneham-pc.gov.uk

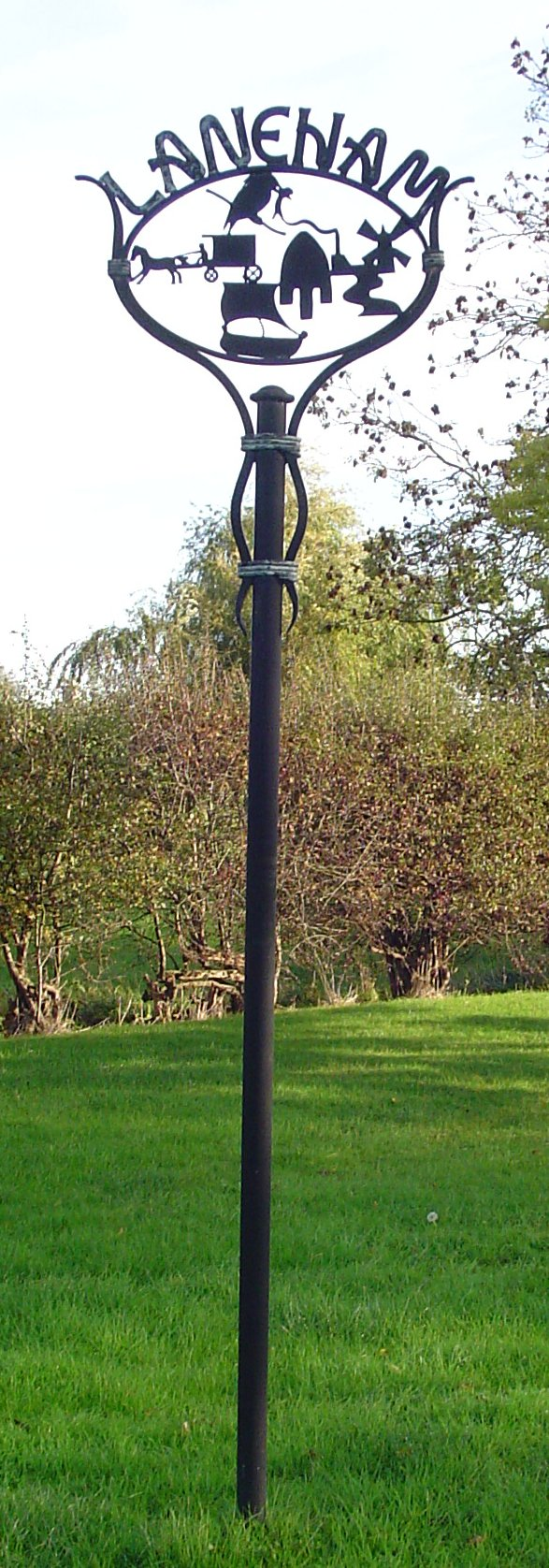
Signpost in Laneham

Laneham is a village and civil parish on the banks of the River Trent in Bassetlaw District in Nottinghamshire, England. The population of the civil parish at the 2021 census was 392. It is 13 miles (21 km) due west of Lincoln and 8 miles (13 km) east of Retford.

== Geography ==
The Parish of Laneham had a total population of 279 people at the 2001 census, at the 2011 census was 312 people, and in 2021 the count grew to 392, approaching the 410 people who lived in the village in 1851. The parish covers an area of 1,618 acres (655 ha), and includes the two settlements of "Town" Laneham and "Church" Laneham, separated by the village beck and a short stretch of low-lying ground. The eastern boundary is formed by the River Trent. Prior to 1884, the parish included 155 acres (63 ha) of land used for parture on the eastern bank of the Trent, but most of this was transferred to the parish of Kettlethorpe. Communication to the east was once easier, as a ferry crossed the river here until 1922. The ferry had a very long history, since a list of stock held by the manor in 1388 included two gangways, which were used by passengers boarding the ferry. The last known ferryman was William Johnson.

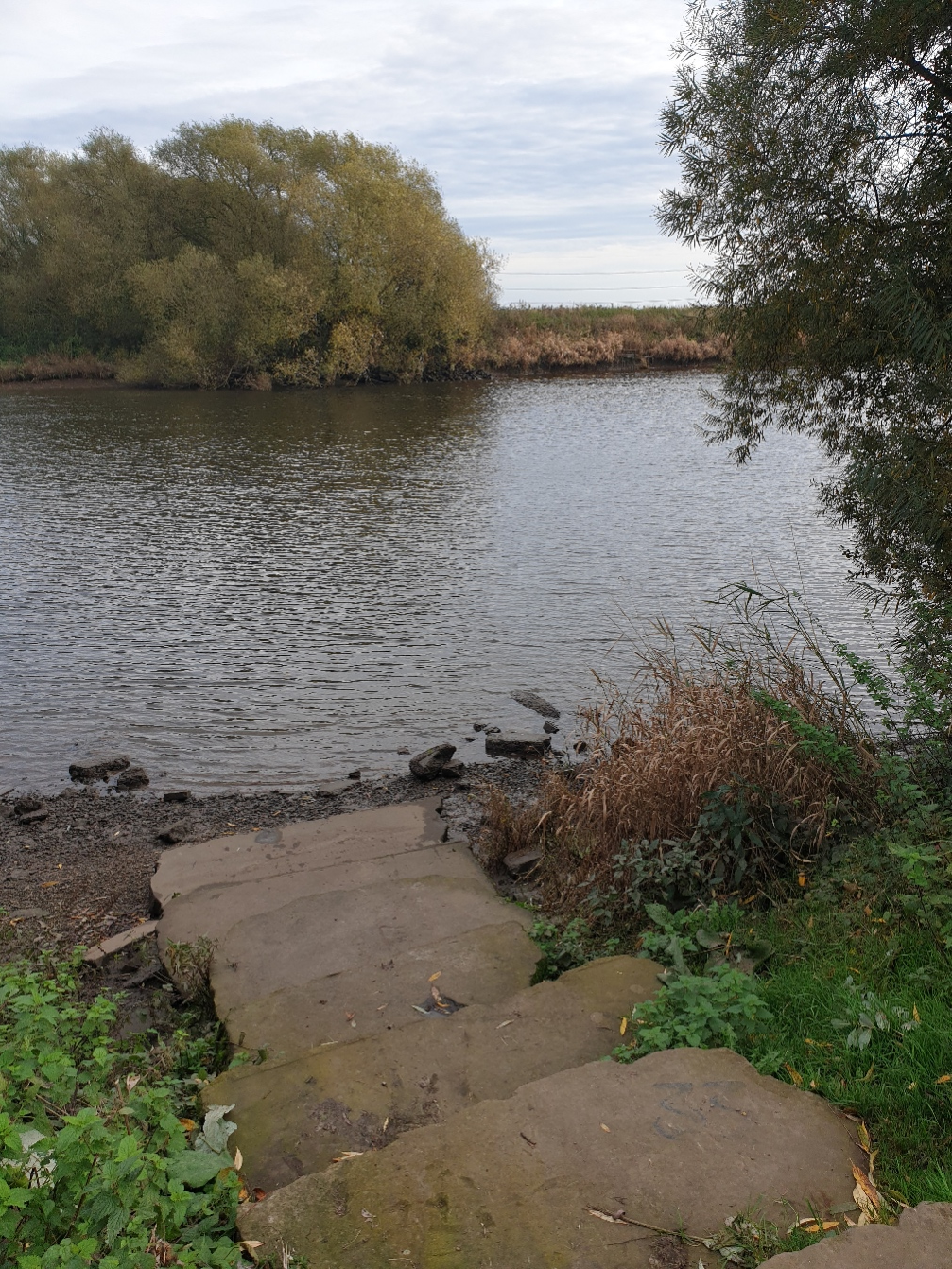
Steps at the site of Laneham ferry

In earlier times the parish suffered some flooding from the Trent and the village beck, but the situation was improved by an Act of 1768–9 which set up drainage commissioners who were to protect Laneham and several other villages from flooding and improve the drainage of the land.

Periodic flooding by the Trent caused problems with the supply of fresh water for drinking from wells. This led to the unusual arrangement where wells at Church Laneham were sunk into the top of the flood bank.

== Infrastructure ==
There are a number of listed buildings in the village, including Manor Farmhouse, with three bays and two storeys, built in the early 19th century, and Binge Farmhouse, with five bays and two storeys, together with a basement and garret, built in the middle 18th century. Willow Tree Cottage is a single-storeyed 18th-century building with three bays and an attic, while Willow Tree Farmhouse is an L-shaped building, consisting of a 17th-century gable-ended wing and a 19th-century wing. As a result of the influence of the enclosure movement, the village prospered, and this is reflected in the substantial farmhouses and the well-ordered field system surrounding the village. Laneham was enclosed by an act of Parliament, the Laneham Inclosure Act 1772 (12 Geo. 3. c. 115 Pr.), the 12th year of George III's reign; the enclosure involved 1,073 of the parish's then 1,589 acres (6.43 km^{2}). Enclosure was first mentioned in October 1767, but it was another five years until an act of Parliament was obtained. There was local opposition to the idea of enclosure, but it is unclear how many people were involved, as the opposition is listed as property on which it was assessed, and consisted of nine messuages and cottages, 83 acres of enclosed ground, 129 acres of open arable and meadow, and 52 beastgates. No breakdown of who owned this property exists.

The village had three public houses: The Butchers Arms (demolished 2009–10), The Ferryboat, and the Ring o' Bells which stood on the site of the present senior citizens' bungalows. The Ferryboat Inn continues to operate as a free house in Church Laneham under new ownership following a period of closure in 2019. A village hall makes use of the former school building. The Parish Church of St. Peter remains open, and is a grade I listed building. Various parts were constructed in the 12th, 13th, 14th and 15th centuries. It was restored in 1891, and the porch was renovated in 1932. The church is the focal point of Church Laneham; it is built on a small knoll above the river and contains a large, elaborate alabaster memorial to Ellis Markham and his son Jervase, which dates from 1636.

A small, disused Methodist chapel still stands in the village. A Laneham Methodist congregation was first recorded in the Society Book of the Epworth Circuit in 1799. The chapel was erected in 1834, and renovations to it were carried out in 1884.

Church Laneham has two caravan sites. Manor Park which has a residential park home & holiday static caravans operating from March to the end of October. Trentfield Farm caters for Caravans, Motorhomes & Tents. This is a popular site with families with its close proximity to Lincoln, Sherwood Forest, Clumber Park and Sundown adventureland.

Laneham formerly had a wharf adjacent to the ferry steps. It used by the packet boats Robin Hood and Little John which ran from Gainsborough-Nottingham until the 1840s. Other loads being sent from the wharf included cheese. It was also used to deliver materials for Rampton Asylum in 1912.

== Schools ==
Laneham had a school in Tudor times since biographical records indicate that Gervase Markham attended it for four years before going to Cambridge. A Government report of 1809 said there was no school in the village but by 1832 a street directory recorded the presence of a schoolmaster Thomas Wildman. The Government report of 1835 listed two daily schools, one for boys with 28 pupils and one for girls with 20 pupils; both of these were fee-paying. In the early 1830s a Mrs Lackenby ran a girls' boarding school; she sued for non-payment of fees and lost. In 1844 a school was built at Dunham-on-Trent to serve five parishes.

In 1853 John Pickwell, later described as 'farmer and carrier', was stated to be the occupier of a three-acre orchard but also a 'school room, garden and outbuildings.' Pickwell later lived at White Villa in Rampton Road.

There was no school in the 1860s, when local children were having to go to Dunham, as is the case now. The village school opened in September 1899 and closed in December 1965. Its pupil numbers were considerably swollen during the Second World War with 27 pupils and two teachers from Great Yarmouth, who arrived in June 1940, and 16 pupils with one teacher from Birmingham who arrived December 1940. One of the Yarmouth teachers was married at Laneham church. From 1936 until closure the headteacher was Miss S D Ashton, who returned to re-open the building in its new guise as the village hall in 1975.

== Charities ==
Information about village charities is displayed in the church and hall. The Laneham poor charity has existed since at least 1700. In that year four Laneham men 'surrendered' a close of about two acres, the revenues of this being used to feed the poor of the parish. Every three years this land was put up for rental on Easter Monday, yielding around £11 6s a year in 1827. The money was paid to the Overseer of the Poor who then commissioned a village baker to provide two shillings worth of bread every Sunday, to be given out as penny and twopenny loaves at the Church. This only cost £5-5-0d a year, so the rest was used to buy coal for the poor.

During the 1820s the Overseer was also receiving 13s from the occupier of three closes in Laneham which belonged to the Vicar of Applethorpe, but no one knew how this arose. More money came from the bequest of William Skelton, who had left £20 for the poor of Laneham. Half of this had been 'vested' in a Rampton farmer, Elizabeth Draper, who paid 10 shillings a year interest; the other half was vested in John Popple, who paid nothing until his death in 1815 when Mrs Anne Warrener took the capital and started to pay out. A woman called Sarah Fillingham also left a close called Clay Half to provide 20 shillings a year for distribution to 'honest widows'.

The population of the village in 1811 was 337, and in 1815, 25 of these were officially "poor", representing 7.42 per cent of the population. This was slightly higher than the 6.96 per cent average for Nottinghamshire at the time.

== Archbishop of York's estate and palace ==
The archbishops of Canterbury held Laneham Manor from an early date, certainly by the time of the 1086 Domesday Book, when 100 acres of pasture at Newton were said to belong to the Archbishop's manor. One who seems to have benefited was William of Laneham who was on the Archbishop's staff in the early 1200s and became Archdeacon of Durham by 1224. William was Prebendary of Bole by 1212 and Archdeacon of Durham by 1224 but in October 1243 'some men were imprisoned at York under suspicion of being concerned in his death.'

King Henry III stayed at Laneham on 3 October 1255 and King Edward I on 15–16 April 1303. Edward then travelled by boat to Beverley.

Thomas de Corbridge, Archbishop of York, decided to spend the summer months in his residence at Laneham in July 1303, to which he presumably travelled by water. However, while staying in the village he became ill and died on 22 September. He was known as a hard-working archbishop and was still handling his business until five days before his death. His body was taken to Southwell for burial, presumably again by water, with most of his final journey being via the Trent. The archdiocese of York properties of Laneham, Scrooby and Askham were leased to Samuel Sandys by his father, Archbishop Sandys, just before his death in 1588 and reputedly on advantageous terms.

Samuel Sandys, who lived in Worcestershire, seems likely to have leased the manor house, some land called The Hades, a fishery, and two 'ferry passages on the Trent' to John Wastnes. In 1601 John Wastnes (or Wasteneys) brought a case against Sandys.

During the Parliamentary era in 1647 the Manor of Laneham was sold to Robert Sweete and Anthony Markeham for £647, though such sales were commonly negated after the Restoration. The Sandys family retained an interest in the Laneham manor for several generations and in 1663 it was held by John Sandys 'of Laneham' and Francis Sandys 'of Scrooby.' There are old references to the remains of a moat from the palace, but these were apparently ploughed out in the 1970s.

Archaeological studies have considered how 'Town Laneham' was laid out by the archbishops as a commercial venture. It has been suggested this involved realigning the main road through the area as Main Street. Evidence of a former road way can be seen alongside the public footpath which connects Rampton Road with Broadings Lane, immediately behind Top Farm.

== The Markham Memorial ==
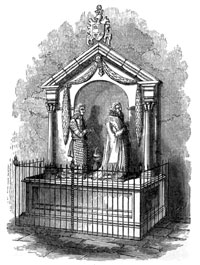
The Markham memorial in Laneham church

An old family history of the Markham family ('Markham Memorials vol 1' by Sir Clements Markham, 1913) sheds interesting light on the two Markhams who kneel facing the east in Laneham church, and have done so for hundreds of years.

At the front is Ellis Markham (c. 1515 – 1578) who was the grandson of a famous Lord Chief Justice. He had a career as an administrator, both with the Duchy of Lancaster based around Ripon and in the household of the Archbishop of York. In 1536 he was working for Archbishop Lee and played a minor role in organising matters during the Lincolnshire Rebellion against the policies of Henry VIII. But by 1547 he was described as being in the household of Queen Catherine Parr which would indicate strong Protestant leanings. He was elected an MP in 1555–7 but Markham achieved some notoriety when Mary I gave him the job of investigating the financial affairs of the disgraced Archbishop Holgate. He gathered in all sorts of treasure and finery at Cawood—to the extent that the next archbishop under Queen Elizabeth tried to sue him for damages.

Ellis Markham had two sons—Gervase and Jerome. The boys apparently went to school in Laneham, and then to Cambridge—Jerome arriving there at the age of 16 in 1576. However, by the 1583 the Markhams were embroiled in a bitter dispute with a ruffian named George Nowell, and Nowell called the Markhams out for a duel.

This was at Edward Stanhope's house, probably at Shelford east of Nottingham—the Stanhopes were earls of Chesterfield eventually. Jerome accepted the challenge although Edmund Elvois said, 'Alas, Jerome is a very young man and without experience in any fray.' They went out into the fields and Noel attacked Jerome, breaking his sword; with his opponent defenceless, Noel proceeded to kill him in an act which many saw as murder. He was buried in Nottingham. Edmund Elvois may well have been the Askham man whose name was usually spelt 'Helwys', and father of Thomas Helwys the Baptist pioneer who paid for the 'Pilgrims' to go to Holland. Noel was a braggart and a bully, with a whole string of local quarrels including with George Lassells at Sturton. Soon afterwards someone spoke up for Noel at a meeting in the archbishop's palace at Southwell, nearly causing another quarrel as the Markhams reacted angrily.

Jerome's brother Gervase lived on but he lived anything but a good life—with a reputation for seducing wenches and stockpiling treasure. Gervase had some success as a soldier and returned home to live mainly at Dunham on Trent. He was known to be the 'gallant' of the Countess of Shrewsbury, a term that was clearly meant to imply more than knightly devotion. He was described as 'a proper handsome gentleman, and of great courage'.

In 1616 Markham was involved in somewhat scandalous legal dispute with Lord Darcy, following an incident with the noble Lord's dog whilst they were both at a hunting event. After this he got involved in a dispute between Sir John Holles and the Stanhope family, as a result of which Holles accused him of 'lying like a villain.' Markham took this as a challenge to a duel, which he offered to fight in Worksop Park—territory of one of Holles' enemies, so Holles declined. Markham took this as a 'refusal'. However the two men met by chance in Sherwood Forect and Holles declared he would 'spoil' Markham; they duelled with rapiers, and Holles ran through Markham 'through the middle of the guts and up to the hilt, and out behind toward the small of the back.'

This incident almost led to full-scale battle between Holles' men and those of Markham's friends, but Markham survived. Apparently he rashly swore to never eat supper or take the sacrament until he had gained revenge—but never did manage to. Despite his poor reputation, in 1625 Markham was Sheriff of Nottinghamshire with lands at Laneham and Dunham. While he was away from his home at Dunham one day, two youths who were reputed to be his 'bastards' robbed his house of property worth £5000—at least £800,000 today. Perhaps to evade capture, the youths buried their treasure in Gamston Woods. In 1627, when he was elderly and bedridden, one of the Holles family ordered his home to be searched for a fugitive catholic priest. This was widely interpreted as the action of someone denouncing Markham for reasons of a grudge, and the vicar of Dunham certified that he had routinely attended his parish church.

He cannot have been that ill in 1625 as he was still alive in 1636, though living the life of a miser. He was spending £40 a year though his income from land was £800 and he had £40,000 in money—so a substantial millionaire in today's values. Markham had no family and refused to acknowledge any of his extramarital offspring, so spent it on no-one. Despite this he refused to pay the king's new tax, Ship Money, and was ordered to be arrested. The vicar had to certify that he was too ill to travel to London, reporting that he had taken communion in his bed for many years.

He died in 1637, old and crippled, and was buried in Laneham church beneath an effigy of himself as a young and handsome man that had been there many years already, presumably commissioned by his father.

== Historical events ==
One of the earliest Laneham events we know of is that William, son of Walter le Pyndere of 'Lanum', was imprisoned and charged for the death of Adam le Paulyn in 1284. However, apart from that 'he has letters to the sheriff of Nottingham to bail him' we know no more of his fate. As a reminder of how close Laneham was to Sherwood at that time, Roger de Lanum was imprisoned in 1286 for 'trespass of venison' in 'Shirewood forest.'

In 1315 the people of Dunham on Trent were ordered to surrender those who had taken the Archbishop of York's swans from Laneham. Another known event in Laneham is one of the first legal cases involving a 'carrier', i.e. someone responsible for transporting another person or their goods. In 1346 William, a ferryman at Laneham, took a man named Richard, his horse and his goods across the river by ferry. However, he only took them part of the way, because William threw the horse and goods into the river. Possibly this was because the ferry was overloaded and they were all at risk of drowning (as in another case a couple of years later) but we know William's conduct 'inflicted other enormities to the grave damage and against the peace'. Damages to Richard's property amounted to 40 marks.

Little is yet been found about Laneham having a role in civil administration, but it is known that at least one major 'trial' was held in the village. Thomas Hancock was the Puritan vicar of Headon from 1605 to 1623, arriving from Elkesley. In 1620 he was fined "6d for riot", at a special sessions in Laneham to try 26 people indicted for riotous assault. Hancock had something of a record for challenging the establishment, having also been one of the Puritan curates sheltered by the Brewsters at Scrooby in the 1590s when he had conducted the apparently illegal wedding of another cleric, Robert Southworth. Another one of those put on trial was James Brewster of Gringley, the brother of William Brewster.

In the Stuart era William Tirwhitt (or Tyrwhitt) was a landowner in the village. He died in 1642 and by 1648 his Laneham lands were sequestered due to his being 'a delinquent Papist' and a 'Papist in arms' but they were restored after the Restoration.

There also seem to have been a few Quakers in the village. Although he was licensed to hold a Quaker meeting at his house, in 1689 Gervase Harrison was prosecuted at the ecclesiastical court following an action by Richard Bradley, vicar of Laneham, for not paying the sum of 6d each for three communicants in his household. Harrison did not appear to answer the case and was committed to Nottingham Gaol for nine weeks, including two weeks in one of its nefarious dungeons. From 1689 William Bartrupp was also licensed to hold a nonconformist meeting. In 1707 John Parker was prosecuted for non-payment of tithes, a typical Quaker offence.

In 1769 Matthew Frankish was sentenced to death for breaking into the house of William Warriner and stealing £2-18-6d in coin. However, he was reprieved from the gallows.

In 1810 the church tower was rebuilt after being struck by lightning, and four bells added at a cost of £800. According to a Church of England report at the time, efforts to raise funds for this locally failed 'as the parishioners are too poor.'

According to the Notts Guardian in 1865 there was a grave in the churchyard for James Penant, a blacksmith, who died on 27 May 1763, with the inscription:

My tongs and hammer I've declined
My bellows they have lost their wind
My fires extinct my forge decayed
And in the dust my vice is laid
My coals are spent my iron gone
My nails are drove my work is done.

Only a few parts of this text are still legible.

In 1818 the village butcher, John Cooling, was dying from 'a tedious illness.' His wife decided to pray for him: 'While on her knees offering her last service to the Supreme Being for her dying husband, about one o'clock in the morning, she was seized with a fit and died, in a few minutes.' Her husband then died about eight o' clock the next morning. 'They were both interred in one grave the following Monday.'

One Laneham event that received coverage in a huge number of newspapers in 1837 was the funeral of the so-called 'King of the Gypsies', Andrew Boswell. How far he was a king may be open to debate, for he died with only an ass, a fiddle and three half-pence in pockets. However an entirely different story was told in press coverage on the death of his 'Queen', Sarah Boswell, aged 93 in 1838. This report stated that Andrew Boswell had died at Bestwood Park in 1835 and had been buried at Eastwood. Sarah Boswell died at Nottingham Union Hospital.

The poverty of Laneham's former curate was reported in the news in 1842 when a return for Robert Peel's new income tax was sent back from the village with the following verse attached:

There's nothing here but poverty,
Scottish rags and hunger;
If Sir Robert Peel has sent you here
Surely it was in anger.

The writer was Rev. John Irvine, a Scottish man who had taken on the curacy of both Laneham and Rampton for the 'shamefully small' stipend of £50 a year. At that time it was quite common for a parish to have a vicar or rector—usually well connected—who drew the income and paid a small portion of it to a less well-connected clergyman to act as curate and do most of the work. After a year or two Irvine had to give up the role at Rampton (for reasons unknown) and was reduced to just the Laneham role, for which he was paid 10 shillings (£0.50) a week, so his pay was little more than that of an agricultural labourer. When Laneham's rector died, Irvine felt he had a strong claim on the senior position and unsuccessfully petitioned the patron of the benefice, the Dean and Chapter of York, for the place.

To make ends meet, Irvine was forced to open a parish school where he could charge parents for the education of their children, but clearly this produced only a small income for him. Government records show a school opened in 1829 for eleven pupils, although from 1833 there was also a Sunday School for twenty-four pupils, funded by Mr J Wright.

Some of the vicars of Laneham were also interesting. In 1764 John Welch was "not able to do any duty, being a little insane". In 1842 Edmund Wallis died, having been vicar for 60 years; this perhaps explains some aspects of Irvine's story.

A few minor crimes received press coverage, giving an insight into Laneham life in the past. In 1839 two women 'had words' in the street and then took to blows in a 'desperate encounter', which ended with one apparently at death's door. In 1843 at harvest the locals mixed with Irish itinerant workers in one of the village inns, but hostility was bubbling under the surface; Charles Parr, Thomas Lane and other local 'ruffians' were found 'absolutely roasting' a young Irish reaper on the fire of the inn until its landlord intervened.

In 1846 Ann Rollett, a woman described as 'of Laneham', took out a draught of prussic acid and drank it while sitting in the 'Rein deer' at Newark. She was not expected to live. Rollett was described as having 'become acquainted with a railway labourer' as a result of which she had had one child, who had died, and was then pregnant with another. She had gone to Newark hoping to get the man to marry her, but without success.

In 1880 a three-year-old child, Alice Haggard, died of burns after her clothes caught fire. She was one of four children left unattended while her mother went out gleaning.

== Wartime events ==
Spanish artist Mario Armengol lived in Laneham during World War Two. An opponent of the Spanish Fascist regime, he had come to Britain with French forces in 1940 and was employed to produce propaganda cartoons, which he posted to London from the village Post Office. One of the family told the BBC that "The good citizens of Laneham, a tiny village, were basically farmers and they'd never seen a foreign person before, let alone a man with a strong accent, wearing a beret, who was sending these large parcels on a weekly basis through their tiny post office to His Majesty's government, so they thought he must be a spy."

There was an air crash on 3 November 1940 when a Handley Page Hampton bomber B1X2978 from No. 83 Squadron, based at Scampton, was on a practice run. Their plane clipped a tree near the River Trent at Church Laneham, which then crashed and burst into flames, killing all the crew.

In 1940 the riverboat Merlin, belonging to the Barber family, was requisitioned for use in the Trent River Patrol section of the Nottinghamshire Home Guard.

== Noteworthy persons ==
The famous Sibthorpe family of Lincoln originated from Laneham, where they had lived since the early sixteenth century. John Sibthorpe (1669–1718) was the first of the family to become an MP for Lincoln and it was his father who had decided to move from Laneham. Charles Sibthorp became one of the most notorious MPs in the country.

Cornelius Atkinson was christened in Laneham in 1815. His family joined Retford Baptist Church and in 1837 he moved to Sheffield where he was a founder of Cemetery Road Baptist Church. Also in this family was James Atkinson. In 1873 James Atkinson, after being a lifelong Baptist, died in Metheringham and the plan was for him to be buried alongside his daughter and son-in-law but the parish priest there would not allow this; Atkinson was brought back to Retford, where he had been baptised on the same day in 1823 as his friend Joseph Winks for burial in the Baptist burial ground. Winks described Atkinson as 'the best man I know in the world.' Atkinson had a deathbed vision of heaven and saw his wife (dead 50 years earlier) and Winks there waiting for him. Winks was a famous Baptist author and a pioneer of reading material for children as well as being a friend of Thomas Cooper.

John Norwood was born in Laneham on 30 March 1879. His father died early and to reduce the burden on his mother, his uncle paid for him to emigrate to New York. He worked as a farmhand with his uncle until his talents became so obvious that he paid for him to attend Alfred College, later Alfred University. This began a successful academic career which included being the Peter White Fellow in American History at the University of Michigan and culminated with being made President of Alfred College.

In 1907 William and Eliza Woolas, who had lived for sixty years in a 'little white cottage in Rampton Lane', were celebrated as the longest-married couple in England at 71 years. They had married at Laneham on 20 April 1836 and a celebration was held in the same church. Woolas was a boatman who brought gravel for the building of Dunham Bridge and had delivered goods in the building of the railway at Cottam. Mrs Woolas claimed to be the first person to have crossed the Trent by the new Dunham Bridge, crossing the 'gap' by a 16-inch batten on a Sunday. Mrs Woolas at least died a few months later at East Retford, aged 90.

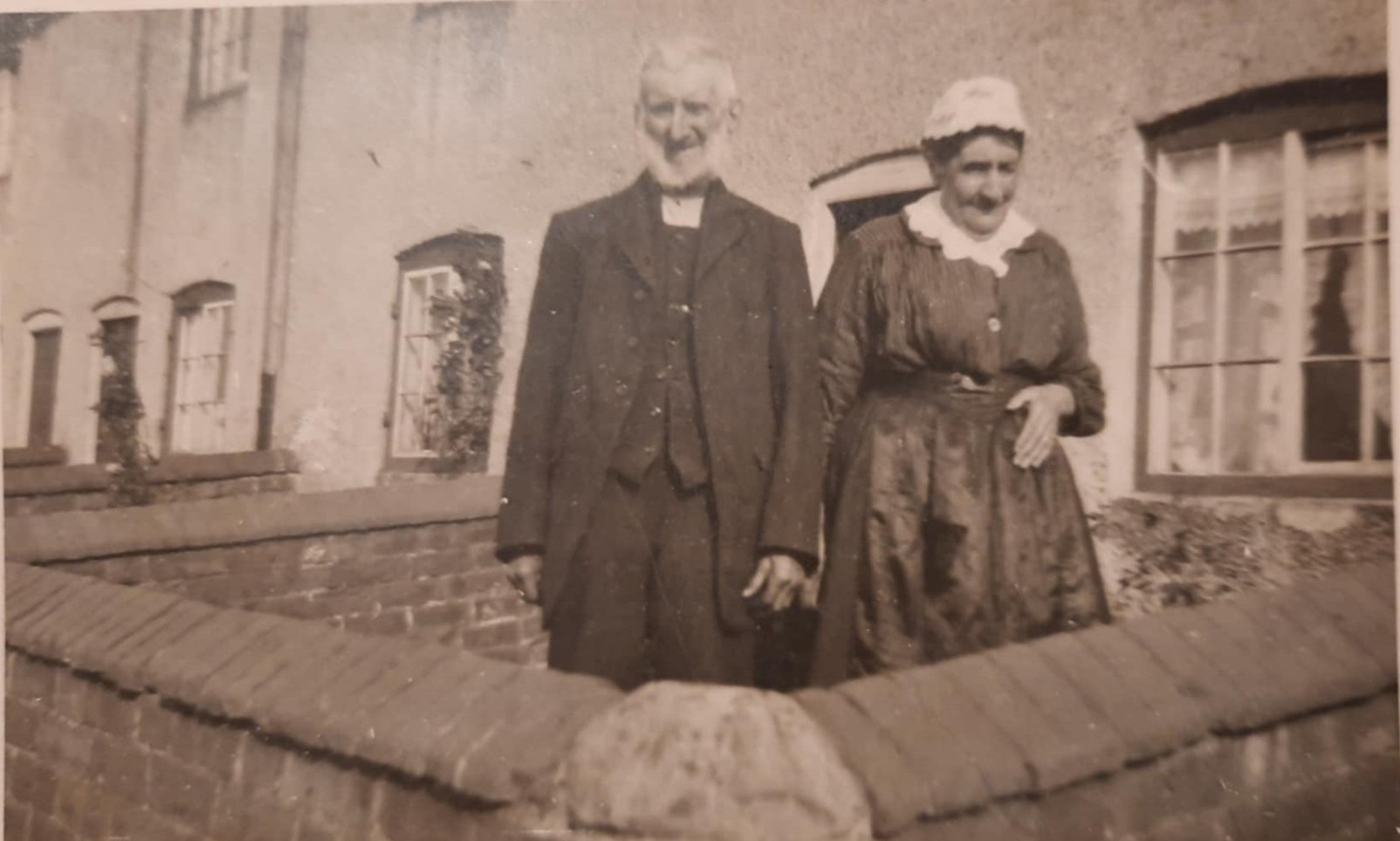
Mr and Mrs Woolas at Laneham (N Goulding collection)

Rev S. S. Skene, a former vicar, was notable for having seven sons who all entered the Church of England ministry themselves, while his daughter married a clergyman in a service held at Laneham. A picture of all the clergy members of the family can still be seen in the church. Skene is unusual in having been a Moravian missionary in the West Indies before joining the Church of England; his own father had been Steward of the Fetter Lane Congregation.

== River tragedies ==
There are many examples of tragic deaths in the River Trent or the beck. In 1842 Benjamin Whittaker, son of the Ferryboat Inn landlord, drowned near the Laughterton bank after a sudden squall. In 1874, a boat captain left his wife in charge of his boat moored in the middle of the Trent at Willow Holt while going to meet a relative. His wife allowed her small son and daughter to play in a small boat or 'drag'. The boy fell in, the mother also fell in while trying to rescue him, and both were drowned.

On 8 September 1879, 26-year-old George Graham fell off a sand boat between Laneham and Dunham-on-Trent and was drowned. His body was not found until 29 July 1880, in Dunham parish, by which time only his boots and a leather strap were still attached.

In 1895 John Horn, son of a Laneham maltster, died when he fell through ice whilst skating. During the inquest at the Ferryboat Inn, a cry went up to rescue Frederick Jordan of Lincoln who had also fallen through the ice while skating and this was successful; Jordan was attempting to skate from Lincoln to Gainsborough and back but had mistaken his route.

In 1906 John Milner, a Yorkshire miner, was staying in lodgings at Mrs Poole's house. He spent a night drinking with friends at the 'Ferryboat' but on his way back in the dark went missing. His footsteps were found leading down the bank into the beck and he was found drowned, with cigar still in hand.

== Local boys made good ==
Laneham boys George Warriner and Enoch Hodgkinson left the village in the late 1700s for a career in London, where they became successful retail drapers with a shop at 124 New Bond Street. In 1788 two women were transported to Australia for seven years after being caught 'shoplifting' from the 'expensive' shop they ran.

George (1745–1822) was born in Laneham to parents who married in the village in 1739. In London, he bought a house in Lisson Grove. Having made his fortune, Warriner then reinvented himself as a country gentleman. He married a lady named Elizabeth and bought a small estate at Bloxham in 1797, Oxfordshire. In 1812 the area was visited by the famous agricultural author Arthur Young, who was impressed by the modern farming techniques in use on the estate. Warriner had a son, named Enoch Hodgkinson Warriner after his friend, who went to Oxford and became a clergyman at Footscray in Kent; Mrs Warriner's letters to her son are preserved in the National Archives. Bloxham stayed in the Warriner family until 1915 but his great-grandson Henry inherited the Weston Park estate of the Earl of Camperdown, for whom he had been gamekeeper. Perhaps George's most enduring memorial is actually the secondary school in Bloxham, which is called the Warriner School.

Enoch is less easy to trace but he had an active business career as well as the drapery side. He was a director of the Hand in Hand Fire Office, an insurance company, and owned properties at Blackfriars Bridge and Child's Hill, Middlesex. He was living 'above the shop' in 1773 and later in Stamford Street. Both he and George were supporters of the Lock Charity Hospital in London. He died in May 1810 at Stamford Street, aged 77. Hodkinson seems to have been a noted supporter of various charities including for poor clergymen and imprisoned debtors.

== Suspected murder cases ==
Laneham hit the headlines in December 1845 with the death of farmer Robert Draper. Draper, the oldest son of a wealthy Rampton farmer, had been born in 1776 and moved to the village after the breakdown of his marriage. He married in 1812 but very soon split from his wife; his wife sued for restitution of conjugal rights in 1838 but lost the case—it having taken her a very long time to bring one. (The Jurist, Volume 1, p. 872) Most of the farm was left to Draper's younger brother Jonathan but he died in 1835 and Robert moved to a better house, probably Top Farm, where he began to farm 70 acres with the help of a labourer named Troop (also reported as 'Hood').

Draper was an eccentric collector of old coins, swords, pistols and watches. "For anything that might take his fancy, he was not particular as to the price he might pay," The Times noted after his death. At 8 p.m. every night he would lock himself into his sitting room with his chronometers and a book, staying up all night until the villagers got up at 6 a.m.; if he heard a noise outside, he would fire his pistols through an 'aperture' in the window.

In 1844 he took in a servant girl, Harriet Trevor, from Ingham in Lincolnshire. She it was who reported that she had got up one morning to find all the doors locked, but had spied him on his hands and knees in the sitting room. She and Hood lay him down, but took several days to summon Mr Oliver, the surgeon. Oliver could do little to stop his death, but did notice he had bumped his head.

Draper was buried in Laneham church, after which the trustees of his will noticed property missing. By this time Harriet Trevor had gone home, but she was traced and her possessions searched—she had £40, an enormous sum for a servant girl. A gold chain was found stitched 'inside her stays'. She confessed that she and Hood had robbed Draper, so Hood's cottage was searched and more property found hidden in a stocking. Then a witness recalled Draper's head had seemed 'soft and boggy' on one side. It was decided to exhume him.

The body was dug up and placed in 'an empty tenement' near the church while the coroner's inquest—with a jury—met at the Butcher's Arms. Viewing the corpse was unpleasant—"the stench was awful and the colour of the face as black as that of an Indian. The beard had grown considerably and was covered with a kind of blue mould," The Times noted. The surgeon told the inquest that marks to the head could have been made with a spade or the blunt end of an axe. Perhaps fearing to place an accusation that could lead to the gallows against people they knew, the jury recorded a view that 'there was no satisfactory evidence as to cause of death'. Hood and Trevor were remarkably lucky to escape with a charge of robbery.

In 1888 a 33-year-old single woman, Harriet Pickwell, was arrested after her baby died while at the workhouse. She was an unemployed domestic servant and the daughter of the Pickwells of Laneham. Charges were dropped after the inquest decided 'accidental suffocation' was the cause.

== Laneham drainage ==
In December 1768, a group of landowners from this part of Nottinghamshire asked the civil engineer John Grundy Jr. to investigate the possibility of draining some 10 square miles (26 km^{2}) of land on the west bank of the River Trent, stretching from Laneham to West Burton. He was accompanied by Samuel Goodhand, his clerk, on the initial site visit, and proposed three components to a solution. The first was a catchwater drain, which would intercept the streams flowing into the area at its western edge, and discharge into the Trent at West Burton. To prevent high water levels in the river flooding the land, he proposed a 7-mile (11 km) flood bank, which would run from Laneham to West Burton. Finally, rainwater would be collected by a Mother Drain and numerous side drains, which would discharge into the Trent through an outfall sluice at Sturton Cow Pasture.

The landowners liked the plans, asking Grundy to produce detailed proposals, and to supervise the obtaining of an act of Parliament to authorise the work. Assisted by the surveyor George Kelk and a colleague called David Buffery, who checked the levels, he spent six weeks producing his plans, which he presented in February 1769. He estimated that 5,900 acres (2,400 ha) would be improved by the scheme, which would cost £2,700 for the catchwater drain, £6,800 for the bank along the river from Laneham to West Burton, £2,400 for the Mother Drain, with an additional £1,200 for the side drains, and £900 for the sluice at Sturton, making a total of £14,000. He spent most of March and April in London, to ensure the bill passed through Parliament, and received £329 for his work up to this point. A detailed plan of the area at a scale of 1:21,120 (three inches to 1 mile) was published.

The resulting act of Parliament appointed drainage commissioners, who met for the first time on 29 May 1769. Grundy became the engineer for the scheme, Buffery was the surveyor of works, and Kelk was the land surveyor. Grundy's plans for Sturton Sluice show a 12-foot (3.7 m) waterway. Brickwork and masonry were erected by local contractors, while the major excavations were handled by Dyson and Pinkerton. Grundy changed the plans somewhat, as he decided that a drainage mill would be needed at Sturton. This had a 15-foot (4.6 m) scoop wheel, and was completed in April 1770 by Henry Bennett from Spalding, at a cost of £458. The works were finished on time in May 1772, with the final cost amounting to around £15,000. Grundy visited the works at least seven times to ensure that his specifications were being met. The only known details of the scheme are preserved in Grundy's Report Books, which he spent the last few years of his life preparing. Running to 12 volumes and 4,000 pages, they were lost, but were re-discovered in the library at the University of Leeds in 1988. The Laneham Drainage scheme is covered in volumes 10 and 11.

The drainage mill which pumped water from the Mother Drain into the Trent was replaced by a 43-horsepower (32 kW) steam-powered beam engine in 1847. It had a larger scoop wheel, which was 26.5 feet (8.1 m) in diameter and 2.25 feet (0.69 m) wide. It was scrapped in 1903, and has been replaced by an Allen-Gwynnes 24-inch (61 cm) electric pump. With the passing of the Land Drainage Act 1930, most land drainage authorities were superseded by internal drainage boards (IDBs), and the original scheme formed the central section of the Laneham IDB, who were responsible for 78.5 miles (126.3 km) of drains and ditches, which helped to prevent flooding of 22.9 square miles (59 km^{2}) of low-lying land. They maintained 10 pumping stations, which included those at the end of the catchwater drain and the Mother Drain. The main sluice was constructed in 1968 to prevent Trent water flooding into the beck. In April 2012, they amalgamated with the Newark, Kingston Brook, and Fairham Brook internal drainage boards to become part of the Trent Valley IDB.

The beck is crossed by a bridge in Dunham Road. This was rebuilt after being destroyed in the floods of 1875. The beck was also crossed by what was known as the 'long footbridge' which connected into the 'field path' to Dunham.

== See also ==
- Listed buildings in Laneham

== Bibliography ==
- Brown, Margery Ellen (1995). Aspects of Parliamentary Enclosure in Nottinghamshire (PDF). Archived from the original (PDF) on 3 November 2018.
- Reports for Commissioners. House of Commons. 1828.
- Hinde, K. S. G. (2006). Fenland Pumping Engines. Landmark Publishing Ltd. ISBN 978-1-84306-188-5.
- Palmer, Robert C (1994). English Law in the Age of the Black Death. N Carolina: University of North Carolina Press. ISBN 978-0-8078-4954-5.
- Skempton, Alec; et al. (2002). A Biographical Dictionary of Civil Engineers in Great Britain and Ireland: Vol 1: 1500 to 1830. Thomas Telford. ISBN 978-0-7277-2939-2.
- Thirsk, Joan; et al. (1991). The Agrarian History of England and Wales: 1348–1500. Cambridge University Press. ISBN 978-0-521-20074-5.
- Workgroup (2008). "Laneham Parish Plan" (PDF). Laneham Parish Plan working group. Archived from the original (PDF) on 23 March 2012.
