= Lording Barry =

English pirate and playwright (1580–1629)

Lording Barry (baptized April 17, 1580–1629) was a 17th-century English dramatist and pirate.

== Career ==
Barry was the son of Nicholas Barry, a fishmonger of London, and his wife Anne Lording. On the death of his father in 1607, he received an inheritance of £10, which he invested in a theatre company, the Children of the King's Revels, at Whitefriars Theatre. Barry went into debt to finance his theatrical ventures, and was jailed in the Marshalsea prison. Freed on bail, he escaped to Ireland, where he took up a career of piracy. He was tried and acquitted for piracy in Cork in 1610 (under the name "Lodowicke Barry"), and in 1617 sailed with Sir Walter Raleigh on his ill-fated voyage to Guiana (having sought a pardon around 1615). Later in life, he was part-owner of a ship called the Edward of London (her principal owner was Edward Bennett), which was granted a letter of marque in 1627. Several of Barry's relations helped settle Virginia, most notably his great-nephew Col. Edmund Scarborough II (1617–71), who followed in the footsteps of his father Edmund Scarborough I (1584 - 1635) and mother Hannah (née Smith), Barry's niece (a daughter of Barry's sister Alice). Barry left a bequest in his will to another great-nephew, Charles Scarborough. Charles Scarborough was a brother of Col. Edmund Scarborough and became a doctor at the English court in 1660; he was knighted by Charles II in 1669.

== Works ==
Barry is known to be the author of one comedy, Ram Alley, or Merry Tricks (1608), which was included in the second and subsequent editions of Robert Dodsley's Old Plays and was long attributed to Philip Massinger. Anthony Wood says it was acted by the Children of the King's Revels before 1611.

The only performance of which any record exists took place at Drury Lane between 1719 and 1723, probably near the latter date. A manuscript cast, which came into the possession of John Genest assigns the principal characters to Robert Wilks, Theophilus Cibber, William Pinkethman, Mills, Mrs. Booth, and Mrs. Seal.

Gerard Langbaine conjectured that an incident in the play that was subsequently used in Thomas Killigrew's The Parson's Wedding was borrowed from the same author from whom Francis Kirkman took the story; which is to be found in Richard Head's The English Rogue, part iv. chap. 19.

There is also evidence that Barry authored or co-authored a second city comedy, The Family of Love (1608), which was once attributed to Thomas Middleton and Thomas Dekker. The two plays share a similar bawdy tone and both end in a mock trial in which the romantic male lead masquerades as a judge to punish the wrongdoers for their sins.
