= The Family of Love (play) =

Jacobean stage play

The Family of Love is an early Jacobean stage play, first published in 1608. The play is a satire on the Familia Caritatis or "Family of Love," the religious sect founded by Henry Nicholis in the 16th century.

The play's date is uncertain; it is most commonly assigned to 1602–7. The play was entered into the Stationers' Register on 12 Oct, 1607, as a play acted by the King's Revels Children, a company of boy actors founded around that time. It was published in quarto in 1608 by the bookseller John Helmes, with printing by Richard Braddock.

== Authorship ==
Though the play was printed anonymously, many scholars have attributed it to Thomas Middleton and Thomas Dekker. The play's authorship is complex; one scholar, Gerald J. Eberle, argued that the comedy displays "several strata of composition," and is "a revision by Dekker and Middleton of an early play written by Middleton and Dekker." David Lake cites evidence for Middleton and also Dekker, though he suggests a third hand, that of Lording Barry. More recent scholarship suggests that Middleton had no hand in the play and that it was probably penned by Lording Barry. A recent edition of the collected works of Thomas Middleton omits the play, naming Lording Barry as the author. In 2008, Charles Cathcart argued that the play was in part the work of John Marston.

== The sect ==
Nicholas's sect was well-known and controversial in England at the time: they unsuccessfully petitioned King James I for tolerance in 1604, and were the subject of many sermons and pamphlets, most of them hostile, as a result. References to the sect recur in the stage plays of the era – in George Chapman's Sir Giles Goosecap, John Marston's The Dutch Courtesan, Middleton's A Mad World, My Masters, and in Every Woman in Her Humour (perhaps by Lewis Machin).

The play satirises the sect's reputation for sexual lasciviousness, and treats the Familists as hypocrites, as Puritan sects are usually treated by Jacobean satirists (as in Middleton's play The Puritan from the same era). The playwrights seemed to have depended on the popular images of the sect as expressed in sermons and chapbooks, without actually knowing much, or caring to know much, about the real group.

== Summary ==
The play presents a cheerfully amoral world in which everyone is a manipulator – the typical world of Middleton's early city comedies. The protagonist, Gerardine, is in love with Maria, but her uncle and guardian, Glister the physician, opposes the match because the spendthrift Gerardine's estates are mortgaged. Gerardine pretends to depart for a long ocean voyage; Glister has no problem when Gerardine makes Maria the heir to his property. When a trunk containing that property is delivered to the sequestered Maria, it contains Gerardine himself. Gerardine fools Glister's wife into thinking that Maria is pregnant with Glister's child; Glister is tried in a prank trial and is blackmailed into allowing Gerardine's and Maria's marriage and paying a hefty dowry.

The anti-Familist satire is strongest in the play's subplots. Glister is in fact cheating on his wife – not with Maria but with the Familist wife of Purge the apothecary. Purge is a "wittol" or complaisant cuckold, though he is distressed to learn that Mrs. Purge is having even more affairs with other sect members. On a third level, the dim-witted gallants Gudgeon and Lipsalve plot to seduce Maria, Mrs. Purge, and Mrs. Glister too, but completely without success. Both Lipsalve and Gudgeon have balcony wooing scenes with Maria, parodying the famous scene in Romeo and Juliet. Gudgeon and Lipsalve separately approach Glister for a potion for seducing Mrs. Purge; Glister fools them into whipping each other. At the play's end, Gerardine and Maria are together, and everyone else has been taught his or her lesson.

== Characters ==
-GLISTER, a doctor

-(Peter) PURGE, a jealous apothecary

-DRYFAT, a merchant, a convert to the Family

-GERARDINE, Maria's lover; cousin to Mrs. Purge

-(Laurence) LIPSALVE and (Gregory) GUDGEON, two gallants who only pursue city lechery

-CLUB, an apprentice

-VIAL, a servant to Glister

-SHRIMP and PERIWINKLE, pages to the gallants

-MRS GLISTER

-MRS (Rebecca) PURGE, an Elder in the Family

-MARIA, niece to Glister

-SERVANTS

== Synopsis ==
Act 1, Scene 1: A gallery in Glister's house
Glister and his wife quarrel with their niece and ward, Maria, over her love for Gerardine. Glister opposes the match because the spendthrift Gerardine has mortgaged his entire estate. Maria argues that it is blasphemous to go against her heart's true desire. Glister dismisses his niece's "love" as "an idle fantasy." He says that he will keep Maria sequestered in her room and banish Gerardine from his property to keep the young lovers apart. Glister's servant, Vial, enters to announce that Master Purge, an apothecary, has invited the Glisters to a farewell feast for Gerardine, Mrs. Purge's cousin. Gerardine is going off to sea. During the dinner, his "sea will"—a will made by sailors prior to their departure—will be read.

Act 1, Scene 2: A street before Glister's house; just below Maria's bedroom window
Lipsalve and Gudgeon warn Gerardine against taking a wife. To them, a wife is the most disagreeable, expensive burden a man could ever want. They argue that life as a bachelor is infinitely preferable to life as a husband. The lovestruck Gerardine rejects their arguments entirely. Maria enters at her window. The gallants stand under her window so they can hear her speak. Maria laments her loss of liberty and wishes to be reunited with Gerardine. Gerardine calls out to Maria to comfort her. He pledges his love to her and tells her that he is going off to sea. Maria promises to remain faithful to Gerardine until he returns. She exits. Gerardine praises Maria's perfection. Lipsalve and Gudgeon warn him not to be fooled by the "outward appearances" of women, which are often at odds with their "inward desires." Gerardine invites the gallants to attend his farewell feast at Purge's home that evening. Gudgeon notes that Purge's wife is a member of "The Family of Love," and looks forward to seeing her at the feast.

Act 1, Scene 3: A room in Purge's house
The servant Club tells Mrs. Purge that Glister, his wife, Gerardine, Dryfat, Lipsalve and Gudgeon will all attend the farewell feast that evening. Mrs. Purge notes that she does not care very much for phony, dimwitted gallants such as Lipsalve and Gudgeon. In a short speech, Club notes that modern gallants do so much swearing that they have almost run out of things to swear by. Purge enters. Club exits. Mrs. Purge tells her husband that she is not feeling well and asks him to have Glister (a doctor) visit her in the morning. Purge replies that he is happy to do anything his wife might require of him. He tells her that he has read Gerardine's sea-will, and although Mrs. Purge has been bequeathed a few tokens, the majority of Gerardine's estate has been left to Maria. Glister, Mrs. Glister and Dryfat enter. Glister says that he is happy Gerardine is going off to sea. Purge informs him of the details of Gerardine's will and notes that all of the materials bequeathed to Maria have been locked in a trunk and will be delivered to Glister's home on the following day. Lipsalve, Gudgeon and Gerardine enter. Gerardine reports that the trio have just come from the theatre, where they saw "Sampson" (a now-lost play that was performed by a boy's company in 1602). Mrs. Purge says that it is a pity the gallants waste their time at the theatre, a pastime she disapproves of. Lipsalve reads Gerardine's sea-will. As Purge hinted, the vast majority of Gerardine's estate has been bequeathed to Maria. A standing cup and close-stool (both phallic-shaped objects) have been bequeathed to Mrs. Purge. As the witnesses gather to sign the will, Gerardine pulls Mrs. Glister aside and warns her to keep an eye on her "loose" husband Glister, who may have lusty designs on Maria. Everyone exits to enjoy the feast.

Act 2, Scene 1: A room in Purge's house
It is morning, and Purge is preparing to go to work. He says that his wife usually attends meetings of the Family in the mornings, but she is—supposedly—sick on this particular morning, and must be "administered to" by Doctor Glister. Purge goes on to reveal himself to be a "wittol," or complacent cuckold. He is fully aware that Glister is having an affair with his wife, but he does not mind at all. Indeed, he seems pleased that another man would volunteer to take over the job of keeping his wife happy.

Act 2, Scene 2: A street
Glister is in a good mood because Gerardine has gone off to sea. He is happy that Gerardine's estate has been bequeathed to Maria.

Act 2, Scene 3: Another street
Gudgeon and Lipsalve greet each other with overblown, phony-sounding compliments. Their pages, Periwinkle and Shrimp, mock them behind their backs. The gallants discuss Mrs. Purge, whom they are both trying to sleep with—so far unsuccessfully. Speaking aside, Gudgeon plans to procure a love potion from Glister so he can seduce Mrs. Purge before Lipsalve gets to her. Gudgeon and Periwinkle exit. Lipsalve—who seems to be thinking along exactly the same lines as Gudgeon—also plans to procure a love potion from Glister.

Act 2, Scene 4: A room in Glister's house
Mrs. Glister says that Maria's love is foolish. Maria contends that her love is honourable and pure. Club enters with Gerardine's trunk and tells Mrs. Glister that Gerardine has left the city. Mrs. Glister asks if Mrs. Purge has gone to a Familist meeting. Club says she has. Mrs. Purge presses him to describe the Familists. Purge tells her that the members of the Family truly "love their neighbors better than themselves"—a sly joke hinting at the Familists' sexual promiscuity. Glister enters and thanks Club for bringing the trunk. Club exits. Lipsalve enters and asks Glister for a potion that will help him seduce Mrs. Purge. Glister tells him that he can sell him such a potion, but it will be expensive, and possibly dangerous. There is a knock at the door. Lipsalve is ushered into another room. Gudgeon enters. Like Lipsalve, he asks Glister for a potion that will help him seduce Mrs. Purge. Speaking aside, Glister wonders why Gudgeon and Lipsalve would come to him on the same day with the same request. He concludes that they must be up to no good and resolves to teach them a lesson. After sending his servant to fetch two whips, he tells Gudgeon that he should go to Lipsalve's chamber between the hours of four and five on the following day. There, he will find Mrs. Purge (who will be transported there by magic) and a spirit who will appear in Lipsalve's form. Glister gives Gudgeon a whip and tells him that he will be able to have his way with Mrs. Purge after he has given the "spirit Lipsalve" a sound beating. Gudgeon agrees to follow Glister's directions and exits. Glister laughs over his scheme and says he will give Lipsalve the same directions he gave Gudgeon—thereby tricking into whipping each other. Glister exits. Maria enters. Standing over the trunk, she laments Gerardine's absence and worries that their love will be destroyed by the passage of time. The trunk opens and Gerardine jumps out. Maria is shocked to see him. He explains that the whole pretense of going to sea was a part of a grand scheme to bring them together.

Act 3, Scene 1: Maria's room
Gerardine tries to convince Maria to have sex with him. But before he can make any progress, Lipsalve enters beneath Maria's balcony, accompanied by his page, Shrimp. Lipsalve is disguised as Gerardine. He tries to woo Maria. Maria leads him on and taunts him for a while—to Gerardine's great amusement. Glister enters and scares Lipsalve away. Gerardine and Maria plan to have sex later on.

Act 3, Scene 2: A street before the meeting-house of the Family of Love
It is evening and Mrs. Purge is on her way to a meeting for the Family of Love. She bumps into Dryfat and talks to him for a while. Their conversation is observed by Purge, who listens from a little way off. Dryfat asks Mrs. Purge why the Family meeting takes place at night. Mrs. Purge tells him that the Family prefers to meet in darkness without candles. She describes the meetings as "carnal mixtures" where members "crowd and thrust together" (i.e. orgies). Purge is shocked to hear that his wife is having sex with so many other men. He begins to reconsider his complacent attitude toward his wife's promiscuity. Dryfat says that he would like to become a member of the Family of Love. Mrs. Purge gives him a password ("A brother in the Family") so that he will accepted into the meeting. Purge hears the password and plans to sneak into the meeting after them. Mrs. Purge and Dryfat knock at the door of the meeting-house, provide their passwords, and are admitted inside. Purge tries to get in too, but he gets the password wrong and is denied entry.

Act 3, Scene 3: Lipsalve's chamber, and outside
Following Glister's instructions in 2.4, Gudgeon and Lipsalve meet in Lipsalve's chamber and mistake each other for spirits. Glister secretly observes them from above. Lipsalve and Gudgeon are scared of each other at first, but eventually begin beating each other with the whips—all to Glister's great amusement. Satisfied that his scheme has worked so well, Glister exits. Lipsalve and Gudgeon eventually realise that they have been tricked and pledge to get their revenge on Glister by seducing his wife.

Act 3, Scene 4: Maria's room
Gerardine and Maria get ready to have sex. Gerardine says that he has a plan whereby Maria's pregnancy will make it possible for them to get married.

Act 4, Scene 1: A street before the meeting-house of the Family of Love
Lipsalve and Gudgeon dress in puritanical robes and prepare to sneak into the meeting house of the Family of Love. Mrs. Purge enters with her servant, Club. Lipsalve and Gudgeon tell her that they have been recruited into the sect by Dryfat. Purge enters and secretly observes their conversation. Mrs. Purge agrees to take Lipsalve and Gudgeon into the meeting with her. She goes to the door, recites the password, and is admitted. Purge follows them. This time, he gets the password right and is allowed inside.

Act 4, Scene 2: A street
Gerardine disguises himself as a porter so no one will know that he has not gone to sea. He meets Dryfat in the street, reveals his true identity, and lays out the details of a scheme to force Glister to relinquish his hold on Maria. According to his plan, he will pose as an apparitor (a summoner for the ecclesiastical court) and Dryfat will pose as an attorney. Thus disguised, they will stage a phony trial where Glister will be accused of getting Maria pregnant. Dryfat agrees to participate in the scheme.

Act 4, Scene 3: A room in Glister's house
Mrs. Glister guesses that Maria is pregnant and demands to know who the father is. Maria refuses to tell. Gerardine enters, still disguised as a porter. He says that he has a letter for Doctor Glister. Mrs. Glister takes the letter (a fake) and reads it. The letter appears to have been written by Glister's mistress. The "mistress" informs Glister that she has given birth to his son. Mrs. Glister falls into a jealous rage. She screams at Maria and says she will go to the law to get revenge on Glister.

Act 4, Scene 4: A street
Lipsalve and Gudgeon are disappointed because they were unable to have sex with Mrs. Purge during the Family meeting. Their conversation reveals that Purge snuck into the meeting and snatched Mrs. Purge away before they could get their hands on her. Purge enters looking very unhappy. Gudgeon and Lipsalve step aside so they can listen to him talk to himself. Purge curses his cheating wife. He was apparently quite shocked to discover the extent of his wife's sexual activity. He wishes aloud that he had witnesses who could testify to his wife's adulterous activities. He says that, during the meeting, he managed to slip his wife's wedding ring off her finger without being recognised. He believes that this ring will provide some proof of his wife's guilt, but he still requires witnesses to make his case against her solid. Lipsalve and Gudgeon step forward and offer to act as witnesses against Mrs. Purge. Overjoyed, Purge says that they should find an apparitor. Dryfat enters with Gerardine, who is disguised as an apparitor. The "apparitor" tells Purge that he works for a commission that will try Glister at Dryfat's house on the following day. Purge pays him to summon Mrs. Purge to the commission. Mrs. Purge enters. Gerardine confronts her and orders her to appear before the commission.

Act 5, Scene 1: A room in Glister's house
Mrs. Glister scolds Glister for his alleged philandering. Glister insists on his innocence. Lipsalve and Gudgeon enter and—without noticing that Glister is within the vicinity—offer to have sex with Mrs. Glister so she can have revenge on her husband. Mrs. Glister agrees to go along with the plan. Lipsalve and Gudgeon quarrel over which of them will get to have sex with Mrs. Purge first. Glister (who has been listening from afar up to this point) comes forward to greet the gallants. Gudgeon and Lipsalve tell him that they are ill, and would like to lodge at his house for a few days so they can receive treatment. Glister agrees to receive them and orders his wife to show them to their rooms. As soon as the gallants are gone, Glister says that he knows they have come to his house to seduce his wife. He plans to get his revenge by administering a tortuous "treatment."

Act 5, Scene 2: A street before Glister's house
Gerardine comes to Maria's balcony and tells her he has arranged a "comedy" that will bring about their marriage. He tells her to meet him at Dryfat's house for Glister's phony trial. Maria tells Gerardine that Glister is subjecting his "patients," Lipsalve and Gudgeon, to a tortuous "treatment."

Act 5, Scene 3: A room in Dryfat's house; Glister's trial
Glister and Purge discuss their respective cases with Dryfat, who is disguised as an attorney. Mrs. Glister, Mrs. Purge and Maria enter. Mrs. Purge scolds her husband. Mrs. Purge proclaims her innocence. Gerardine enters disguised as a judge. He hears Purge's case against his wife first. Mrs. Purge continues to insist that she is innocent. Lipsalve and Gudgeon are brought in to act as witnesses against Mrs. Purge. They are extremely sick as a result of Glister's treatment, and do not provide any meaningful testimony. As a last resort, Purge exhibits the wedding ring he took from his wife in 4.4. Mrs. Purge claims that she donated the ring to charity a long time ago. The "judge" dismisses Purge's case for lack of evidence. Mistress Purge makes a halfhearted promise to behave more modestly in the future. The "judge" hears Glister's case next and decides that the evidence—including the phony letter from 4.3 and Maria's pregnancy—is sufficient to warrant a heavy punishment. In lieu of more severe measures, the "judge" offers to drop all charges if Glister will seal a bond avowing his permission to allow Maria and Gerardine to marry. Glister agrees to the deal. He seals the bond on the spot. Gerardine and Dryfat reveal their true identities. The play ends on a note of festivity.
