= The Dumb Knight =

The Dumb Knight, The Dumbe Knight: A Historical Comedy, or The Dumbe Knight: A Pleasant Comedy, written by Lewis Machin and Gervase Markham in roughly 1601 was acted by the Children of the King's Revels likely in the Whitefriars Theatre, which was the acting group's primarily venue. The play was first published in 1608 by Nicholas Okes and were sold at John Bache's in Popes-head Palace near the Royal Exchange in London. The play takes place in Sicily and the main plot focus on the characters around the King of Cyprus, who has just conquered Sicily. A strange love between Philocles and Mariana form which nearly has Mariana executed. Out of revenge for the dishonour towards his sister Duke of Epire plans to remove Philocles and the King and make himself king promising that they “both shall tumble down”. While the subplot of Prate and Alphonso provide comic foolery and clash with the main plot at the end of the play. Although the title of the play is The Dumb Knight, Philocles, the “dumb knight” and the second in command to the King of Cyprus, is only mute for a couple of scenes in Act Two and Three. Philocles has an active voice throughout the play and his spell of speechlessness is used to advance the main plot but is not the plots focus.

== Characters ==
MEN:

- King of Cyprus
- Philocles, The Dumb Knight, and second in command to the King.
- Duke of Epire, Brother to Mariana.
- Alphonso, A wealthy and extravagantly dressed lord.
- Florio, A servant under Epire.
- Prate, An orator.
- Precedent, Prate’s clerk.
- Caelio, High Marshal for the Queen.
- Mechant, Client of Prate the orator.
- Velours, Client of Prate the orator.
- Drap, Client of Prate the orator.
- Chip and Shavings, Carpenters.
- Heralds, Watchmen, Gentleman-Usher, Physician, Executioner, &c.

WOMEN:

- Queen of Sicily.
- Mariana, Friend of the Queen, and sister to the Duke of Epire.
- Lollia, Prate’s wife.
- Coloquintida, Lollia’s friend.
- Attendants, &c.

Scene, Sicily.

== Synopsis ==
The Dumb Knight is essentially two plays put together, one serving as the main plot while the other as the subplot. The two plots converge once at the beginning, when Lollia the wife of Prate views the duelling which determines the outcome of the war between Sicily and Cyprus, and at the end of the play when accusations of Prate reach the King, and Lord Alphonso is brought forth by guards as a pretender of class.

=== Main Plot ===
The play starts with the King of Cyprus at war with Sicily. He is winning the war but his desire to marry the Queen causes him to call for “a parley”. The Queen challenges the King “to single combat” to determine who will be the victor of the war. The King agrees, and the Queen selects her two champions, the Duke of Epire and Lord Alphonso, to duel against the King and Philocles. In scene three the combatants meet, and spectators gather to witness the duel including Lollia the wife of Prate. The combatants fight and Philocles bests Alphonso, while Epire overthrows the King of Cyprus. Because there is a draw, it is decided that the two winning combatants must duel each other to determine the winner. More fighting ensues and Philocles wins. Feeling humiliated for losing the war between Sicily and Cyprus the Duke of Epire swears revenge against Philocles. Sometime later Philocles is found musing over Mariana only to have her coming towards his direction. Crying out, “Madam, one word!” Philocles implores to speak with her. Mariana replies with, “Aye; so now farewell!” and intends to keep on walking. Philocles beseeches Mariana to listen as he professes his love for her. They battle back and forwards over his love and her desire for chastity until she finally agrees to love him only if he promises to take a vow of silence and “not speak for fully twelve months” to prove his love and honour towards her. He accepts her challenge one last sentence of promise and Mariana leaves believing he will fail in his quest. Florio then summons Philocles to go and speak with the king. The prince leaves without a word and speaks without a word to the King.

It is considered a miracle, or some form of magic, that holds Philocles tongue from speaking to his beloved King causing the royal court to be troubled by the knight's dumbness. The King has sent for the greatest doctors and sorcerers to cure Philocles of his plight, but they all announce there is no cure. Greatly grieved the King pronounces, “Since no man hitherto could do him good,/the next shall help him or else lose his blood”. Mariana speaks up that she knows the cure, and the King declares that if she is successful she will attain great glory but if she fails she will be executed. Confident in her ability to cure Philocles Mariana accepts the King's terms. Turning to face Philocles she informs the dumb knight that he no longer is bound to his vow to her. Yet still Philocles refuses to speak. The King sentences Mariana to be executed the next morning. Mariana's brother the Duke of Epire, Lord Alphonso, and the Queen of Sicily plead the King to spare Mariana's life before the execution the next day.

Finding solace that she will die chaste Mariana is prepared to die and forgives the executioner for his actions. Just as the executioner is prepared to strike Philocles speaks halting the executioner's action. There is great rejoicing, and everyone expects Philocles to marry Mariana, but he refuses to marry her believing that he has not yet earned the right to lover her. These recent events further vex the Duke of Epire to the point of greater revenge. The Duke plots to over through the King by making the King believe that Philocles is actually in love with the Queen and having an affair. The Duke hopes that jealousy will blind the King to execute them both. After the execution, the Duke plans to publicly reveal that the Queen and Philocles were not lovers, and with public support overthrow the King. The Duke's plan nearly works as the King allows jealousy to overpower his reason.

Mariana figures out her brother's plot and attempts to rescue her beloved Philocles and the Queen. She pays off the Jailor so that she may see Philocles alone in his cell. The Philocles and Mariana change clothing and they exit together to go for the Prince and Queen's trial before the King. Sentenced to death Mariana, disguised as the Philocles, encourages the Queen to “challenge the law” and have a champion fight for Queen's honour, and if the champion should win the Queen would be proved just. The King accepts and a masked Italian knight, Philocles, steps forward to fight for the Queen while the Duke of Epire fights for the King. Philocles wins the battle and causes the Duke to confess his crimes. The Duke is sentenced to be executed, and finally Philocles agrees to marry Mariana having finally proved his honour towards her.

=== Subplot ===
The sub-pot starts out with Lollia, the wife of Prate, and Coloquintida, her friend and neighbor, talking about wealth, Prate, and Alphonso. Most of the conversation hangs on Lollia's husband, Prate, who has an anger which “is the worst favour’dest ... of any man’s in all Sicily”. The reader learns that Lord Alphonso has a fancy for Lollia, and she likewise has a fancy for him. Prate enters the scene looking for his wife. Fearful of his anger Lollia distracts him by scolding him for how poorly he dresses. The distraction works as Prate changes subjects informing his wife of the impending duel of the main plot, and has his clerk, Precedent, find “a good standing for [his] wife”. Believing his master is asking for advice about regaining “good standings” with Lollia, Precedent provides foolery in the form of misunderstanding the command, most of the advice having sexually undertones. Eventually Prate sets his clerk straight, and they all – Lollia, Cologuintida, Precedent, and Prate – leave for the duel. After the duel Prate and his party are returning to his house when he is greeted by Lord Florio. Florio gives Prate summons to the royal court for “the drawing out of [surrender agreements] for the benefit of both kingdoms”. The orator promises to be there soon and then orders his wife to go straight home and remain chaste about her actions. Before the orator can head to the court, three of his clients – Drap, Velours, and Mechant – do their best to bring closure to their various suits. They all imply that he has been putting off their affairs for a while, but the orator informs them that he has “present business of the King’s” and he would attend to them later then runs off to court. After Prate has left for the court Lord Alphonso enters the scene looking for Lollia, hoping to woo her into adultery he professes his love to her. She agrees to see him at her home and after eight the next day when her husband goes to work. With a kiss they part ways, both eagerly expecting the new day.

In the early morning many people line in front of Prate's house with their suits and petitions. The Prate hears everyone's petition but the Mechant's suit because Prate accuses the man of helping the King of Cyprus win the war over Sicily. The orator then leaves for the King's court while consoling others of the city. The Mechant, who came to inform the orator of his wife's adultery, is left disgraces and brooding. When Lord Alphonso arrives to lay “his horns in [the orator’s] way”, the Mechant hides to witness the act. Moments later the orator comes running home for he had forgot his court files. Lollia hides Lord Alphonso in her closet but forgets his clothes which are on her bed. When Prate enters the room he suspects adultery and sees the clothes. Caught in the act Lollia is clever and lies telling her husband that a friend has brought the clothes over for him try on. The orator does so and finds them a good fit and tells his wife to buy them. Donning on his orator robes over them Prate then runs off to court. When it is safe for Lord Alphonso to come out of the closet Lollia informs him that the orator has taken his clothes and he must borrow one of the orator's petticoats to cover himself or return home naked.

Having witnessed these acts the Mechant goes to court to find royal guards with the goal to have Lord Alphonso apprehend. Mechant tells the guards that Alphonso is a possible spy who should be brought before the King and the court. When Alphonso tries to enter the castle to go to his chambers, the guards arrest Alphonso and bring him before the King how has just concluded the trial of the Queen and Philocles. Before the King, Alphonso confesses that he has been sleeping with the orator's wife. The Mechant then steps forward to testify to the story and brings forth that the orator has refused to see to his suit. The orator is brought in to learn he is “the greatest cuckold in [the] land” and a lazy orator, ending the play.

== Themes ==
The themes of the main plot and subplot challenge each other, creating foils for comparison. The main plots themes are Chastity, Honour, and Revenge. While the subplots themes are Adultery, Sloth, and Justice.

Chastity/Adultery

In the play Mariana embodies the desired traits of chastity. Mariana's pride of her chastity leads to Philocles spell of dumbness, and nearly her execution. At the end of the play it is Mariana's chastity and honour that Philocles falls in love with. Likewise, Lollia represents adultery. Lollia allows herself to be wooed by Lord Alphonso under the encouragement of her friend Coloquintida. Lollia's adultery leads to the dishonouring of her husband, Prate, and Lord Alphonso.

Honour/Sloth

Both Philocles and Mariana embody the desired traits of honour. The honour often represented is a chivalric honour. Mariana gains honour within the play by standing against her brother's scheme to over through the king and kill Philocles and the Queen; while Philocles is always portrayed with an overabundance of honour, causing his character to be more static. In comparison, the vice of sloth and laziness is found over abundantly in Prate the orator of the King. His vice leads to his dishonour at the end of the play for the refusal to help those that the king has sent to counsel.

Revenge/Justice

The Duke of Epire portrays revenge when he plots to kill Philocles and later overthrow the King. The Duke's plots of revenge fail due to honour and justice, causing him in the end to confess his crimes leading to his sentence to execution. The Mechant embodies the person who chooses justice over revenge. When first wronged by the orator the Mechant does not seek revenge. Desiring to gain honour Mechant tries informing the orator of his wife's adulterous plans, but Prate still refuses to speak with him. Instead of taking revenge the Mechant instigates a plot to reveal the orator's laziness before the King, a higher power. The line between revenge and justice is a difficult one. In the play, the act of justice is allowing a state to pronounce judgment. While the act of revenge, is taking judgement into the hands of the individual.

== Date and Text ==
The play has two authors, Lewis Machin, who signs the address “To the Understanding Reader,” and Gervase Markham, who is the more well-known of the two authors. There is little evidence as to if the two authors collaborated on the play based on the incoherency of the play as “they are inadequately and inartistically joined”. It is believed the drama was first performed by the Children of the King's Revels|Children of the King's Revels acting company some time in 1601, and later adapted into German by Jakob Ayrer, an amateur playwright of the Englische Kömedianten a Nuremberg acting company, before his death in 1605. Despite the plays jarring inconsistency, it is assumed that the play was popularly received and was possibly performed in theaters for at least thirty-two years by various acting companies as the play was republished in 1633.

The play has two distinct editions:

1)^{†} “The dumbe Knight. A historical Comedy, acted sundry times by the children of his Majesties Revels.” London, Printed by Nicholas Okes, for John Bache, and are to be sold at his shop in Popeshead Palace, neere to the Royall Exchange.” 1608. 4to.
2) “The Dumbe Knight. An Historical Comedy,” acted sundry times by the children of his Majesties Revells. London, Printed by A. M. For William Sheares, and are to be sold at his shoppe in Chancery Lane, near Seriants Inne.” 1633. 4to.

^{†} This edition had a different title page to some of the copies, but in all other respects they were similar: it was as follows—“The Dumbe Knight. A pleasent Comedy, acted sundry times by the children of his Majesties Revels. Written by Jarvis Markham.” [Imprint the same as above.] C.

The mystery of the text is who wrote what. It is almost certain that Gervase Markham worked on the main plot due to his history of literary productions and well written blank verse; while the comic subplot, in prose, was probably written by Lewis Machin. There are a number of inconsistencies between the plots. One is the span of time. The main plot spans a number of weeks while the subplot is no more than two days. Another inconsistency is the play's incoherent message; the main plot's moral message focuses on honesty and chastity verse the subplot's celebration of flamboyant dress and cuckoldry. Because of the inconsistency between the main plot and subplot it is believed “the two authors did not write in intimate collaboration”. Further Joseph Quincy Adams in his essay “Every Woman in Her Humor” and “The Dumb Knight” goes in depth as to how heavily Machin relied on his previous play to write the subplot at times using direct lines verbatim from Every Woman in Her Humor.
