= Robert Hayman =

Canadian poet (1575-1629)

Proprietary Governor of Bristol's Hope
- In office 1618–1628
- Preceded by: John Mason (Note: As Governor of Bristol's Hope)
- Succeeded by: Sir Richard Whitbourne (Note: As Governor of Renews)

Personal details
- Born: 14 August 1575 Wolborough, Devon, England
- Died: November 1629 (aged 54) Oyapock, French Guiana
- Education: Exeter College, Oxford

Robert Hayman (14 August 1575 – November 1629) was a poet, colonist and Proprietary Governor of Bristol's Hope colony in Newfoundland.

== Early life and education ==
Hayman was born in Wolborough near Newton Abbot, Devon, the eldest of nine children. His mother was Alice Gaverocke and his father, Nicholas Hayman, a prosperous citizen and later mayor and MP of both Totnes and Dartmouth. By 1579 the family was living in Totnes, where in the high street Hayman as a small boy met Sir Francis Drake, who presented him with an orange (Hayman records the incident in one of his poems).

According to the 17th-century historian Anthony Wood Hayman was educated at Exeter College and the college register shows him matriculating on 15 October 1590 (the register wrongly shows his age as eleven whereas in fact he was fifteen). He then, according to Wood, "retired to Lincolns-inn, without the honour of a degree": but here Wood is incorrect, as Hayman commenced B.A. on 8 July 1596. He was admitted as a law student to Lincoln's Inn on 16 October 1596, where, again according to Wood, he "studied for a time the municipal law", though modern researches find no evidence of this or of any intention to qualify as a lawyer. In his supplication for B.A. Hayman had mentioned a plan to travel and study in Europe, and this apparently happened, as in a letter his father wrote to Robert Cecil in 1600 he states that he hoped for a career for his son in some government office, and that towards this end he had educated him at both Oxford University and at Poitiers. Wood explains that "his geny being well known to be poetical, (he) fell into acquaintance with" a literary circle which included Ben Jonson, Michael Drayton, John Donne, George Wither, John Owen and others. These encouraged his literary efforts with the result, according to Wood, that Hayman had "the general vogue of a poet". Perhaps because of these distractions Hayman seems not to have achieved any significant public office in England. Although Edward Sharpham dedicated a play to him in 1607 there is nothing further known about his activities for twenty years until he emerges as a venturer and colonist to the new world.

== Family ==
Hayman was married on 21 May 1604 at St Petroc's Church, Exeter, to Grace Spicer, daughter of a prominent merchant of Exeter; but they appear to have had no children and as Hayman does not mention her directly in his works it seems she died young. Several of the poems later published in the book 'Quodlibets' however are dedicated to other members of the Spicer family, so he apparently remained on friendly terms with them.

== Colonial career ==
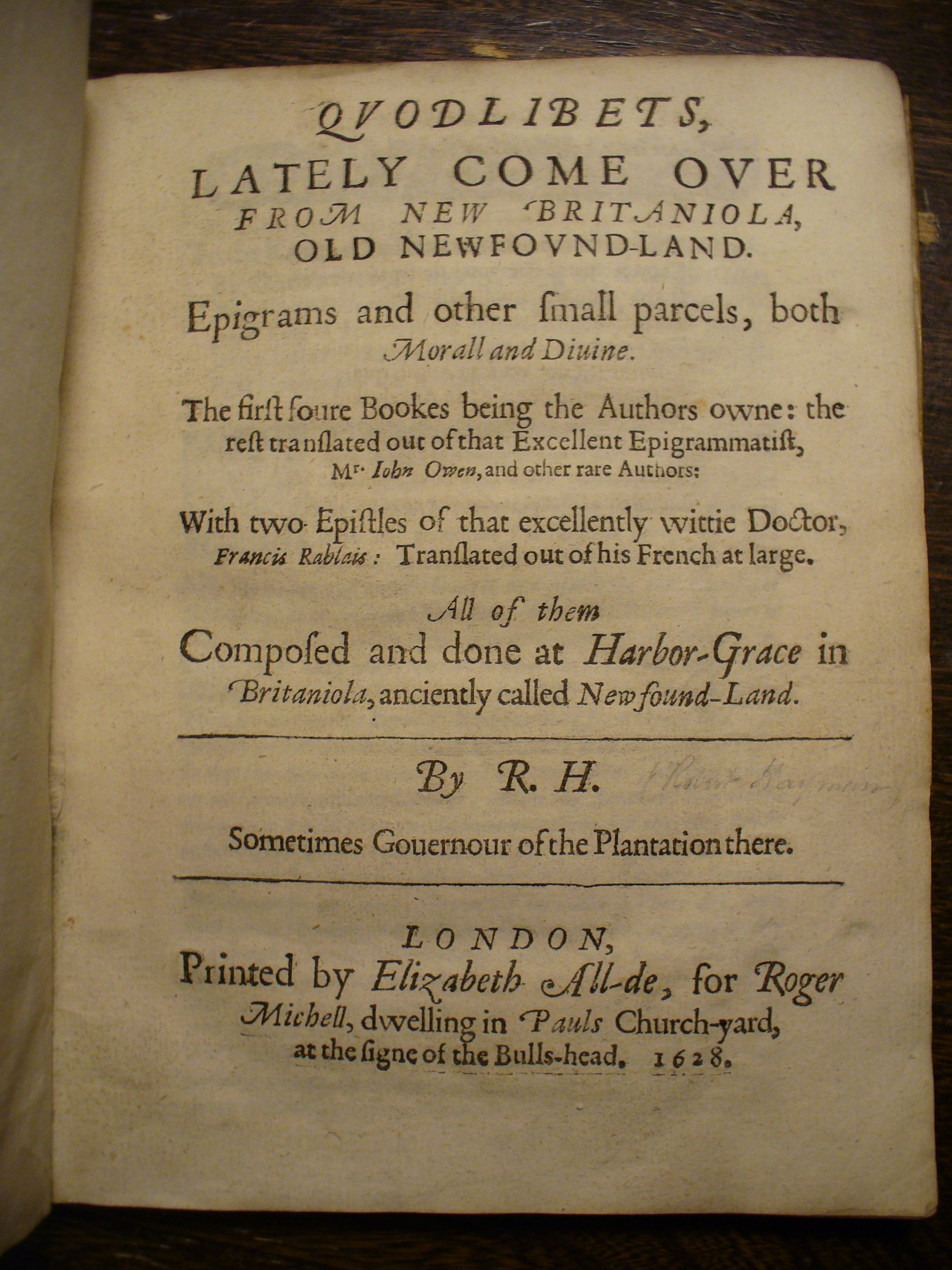
The title page of Quodlibets ("What you will") (1618—1628)

Hayman was appointed the governor of Bristol's Hope colony in 1618 when Bristol's Society of Merchant Venturers received a charter from King James I of England to establish the settlement. Hayman's brother-in-law John Barker was the society's master. Hayman lived in the colony for fifteen months before returning to England and visited again over several summers until his tenure as governor ended in 1628. Much of his work was in England raising money for the settlement, publicizing it and encouraging more colonisation efforts. In 1628 he petitioned the king's favourite the Duke of Buckingham to forward a "Proposition of profitt and honor" to the king which set out the need to encourage continued colonization of Newfoundland, and which specifically mentioned a plan to build a settlement to be called 'Carolinople' (i.e. "Charles's Town").

As Newfoundland's first poet in English, Hayman is remembered for his writings extolling the island, its climate and its early English pioneers. In his leisure hours as governor in Harbour Grace he composed a work later published in England as Quodlibets. Quodlibets ("What you will") was the first book in the English language written in what would become Canada. Some of it consisted of original short poems by Hayman, and some of translations, both of Latin poems by John Owen (epigrammatist) and of French prose by Rabelais. It was published in London in 1628, presumably as part of Hayman's attempts to raise interest in the colony.

Although Hayman apparently remained committed to Newfoundland he was also interested in other colonial ventures, including one to Guyana under the direction of Robert Harcourt. Having arranged his financial affairs he made his will late in the fall of 1628 and left in the Little Hopewell for the Amazon. By February 1629 (new style) he was in Guiana looking into using the river 'Wiapoco' (modern Oyapock) as a trading route.

== Death ==
It was while travelling up the Oyapock by canoe that Hayman died of a sudden fever and was hastily buried by his companions near the banks of the river, on or about 17 October 1629. His will, signed and sealed on 17 November 1628 but not proved until 1633 (1632 Old Style), leaves his estate to "my loving Cosin and Nephew Thomas Muchell of Longaston" (modern Long Ashton) "in the Countie of Somersett...". His will also mentions two "policies of insurance" taken out with the diocesan chancellor of London, Arthur Duck. Of the value of £100 each, one related to the safe arrival of Hayman's ship in Guiana and the other was "of one hundred pounds assured by the said Doctor Arthur Ducke on my life".

== See also ==
- List of Newfoundland and Labrador lieutenant-governors
- Proprietary Governor
