= Edward Sharpham =

16th/17th-century English playwright and pamphleteer

Edward Sharpham (baptised 1576 – 1608) was an English playwright and pamphleteer.

== Life ==
He was baptised on 22 July 1576, the third son of Richard Sharpham of Colehanger, a manor in the parish of East Allington. His father having died when Sharpham was five his mother married Alexander Hext, with whom she had three children. Having been widowed a second time in 1588, she subsequently married Charles Barnaby of Clement's Inn.

Sharpham probably attended grammar school in Devon, possibly William Kemp's school in Plymouth. He was admitted to the Middle Temple on 9 October 1594.

In 1592 Sharpham's mother began a lawsuit against a Thomas Fortescue, alleging he had murdered her first husband by poison and also used witchcraft to make her fall in love with him. Four years later Sharpham himself also sued Fortescue and another man, William Bastard, on a charge of having tampered with evidence relating to his mother's suit. He remained associated with the Middle Temple.

On 22 April 1608, aged 31, Sharpham made his will. He died the next day, and was buried in St. Margaret's, Westminster.

== Works ==
Sharpham is believed to have been the 'E.S.' who in 1597 wrote The Discoverie of the Knights of the Poste, a pamphlet of the "conycatching" genre detailing the tricks of conmen active on the road between London and Exeter. He may also be the 'E.S.' who contributed a commendatory poem to the publication of Ben Jonson's Volpone (1607), although Jonson later described Sharpham as a "rogue".

His first known play, The Fleire, was written for one of the popular boys' theatre companies, the Children of the Blackfriars. Composition date is some time between late 1605 and the play's appearance in the Stationers Register on 13 May 1606. Cynical in tone, The Fleire is a court-oriented satire similar to Marston's The Malcontent and The Fawne. The play's popularity, at least as text, is shown by its being reprinted three times.

Cupid's Whirligig was Sharpham's second and last play, produced early in 1607 and printed later the same year with a dedication to fellow Devonian and author Robert Hayman. Again, it satirises court life in a general way, though it has been speculated that the character Nucome, carefully described as 'Welsh', may actually be a veiled attack on the king's Scottish favourite Robert Carr. This play too was eventually reprinted three times.
