= Church Laneham =

Village in Nottinghamshire, England

Coordinates: 53.28°N 0.78°W

- Location within Nottinghamshire
- OS grid reference: SK815765
- District: Bassetlaw
- Shire county: Nottinghamshire
- Region: East Midlands
- Country: England
- Sovereign state: United Kingdom
- Post town: RETFORD
- Postcode district: DN22
- Dialling code: 01777
- Police: Nottinghamshire
- Fire: Nottinghamshire
- Ambulance: East Midlands
- UK Parliament: Newark

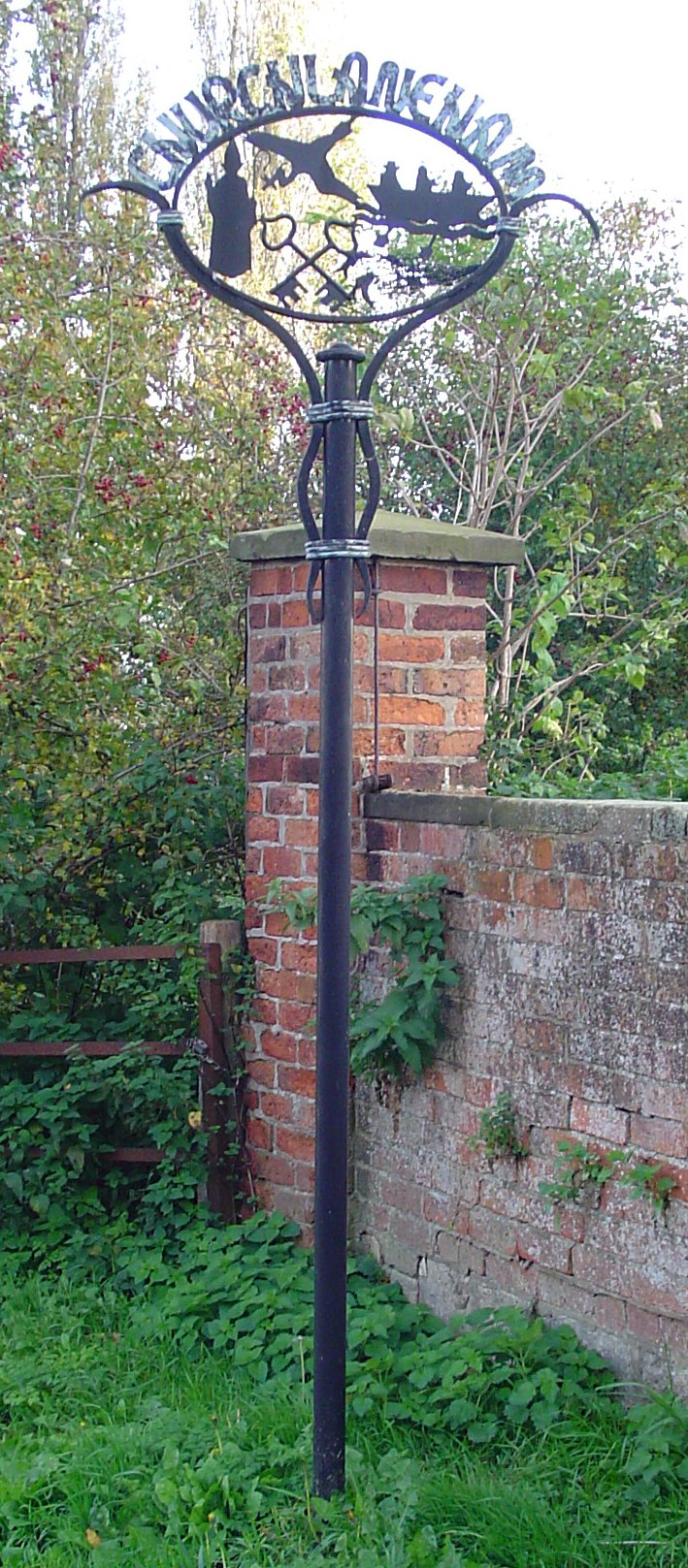
Signpost in Church Laneham

Church Laneham is a village in Nottinghamshire, England. It is located 9 miles east of Retford, on the west bank of the tidal section of the River Trent. The village is within the Laneham civil parish, and is ½ mile to the east of Laneham. It was an estate village of the Bishop of York, and the location of a ferry crossing of the river, commemorated by the name of the public house The Ferry Boat Inn which continues to operate opposite the lane which used to be the entrance to the ferry port. It is in the Tuxford and Trent ward of Bassetlaw Council.
