= John Allde =

Scottish stationer and printer

John Allde, also Aldaye, Alde or Aldye (fl. 1555–1592) was a Scottish stationer and printer. He was the first person on the registers to take up the freedom of the Stationers' Company, when in January 1555 he paid the modest sum of 6s. 8d. for the customary breakfast to the brotherhood. His name appears in the original charter of the company in 1557.

From 1560 to 1567 he received many licenses for ballads and almanacs, but for little else. He then began to print more books, chiefly of a popular nature, but continued his incessant production of ballads, many of which are to be seen in Henry Huth's 'Ancient Ballads and Broadsides' (1867). Herbert seems to have possessed or examined but few books of this press; the list of examples is much enlarged by Thomas Dibdin. Allde lived 'at the long shop adjoining to St. Mildred's Church in the Pultrie,’ and, judging from the considerable number of apprentices bound over to him from time to time, must have carried on a flourishing bookselling trade. After his death his widow Margaret continued the business, and took an apprentice on 23 April 1593, when she was described as ‘widowe, late wife.' On 25 June 1594 and 3 March 1600, she took two more apprentices, and then her name disappeared from the registers.
