= Gervase Markham =

16th/17th-century English poet and writer

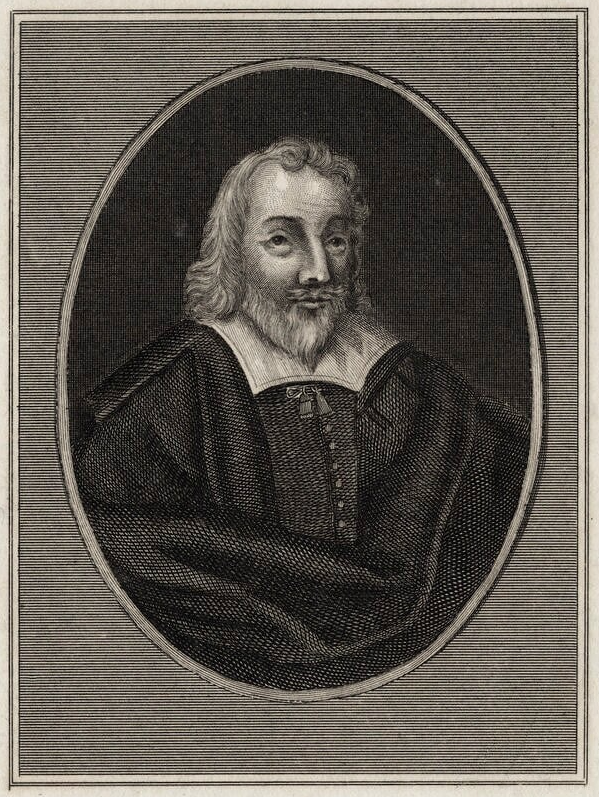
Gervase Markham by Burnet Reading, after Thomas Cross

Gervase (or Jervis) Markham (c. 1568 – 3 February 1637) was an English poet and writer. He was best known for his work The English Huswife, Containing the Inward and Outward Virtues Which Ought to Be in a Complete Woman, first published in London in 1615.

== Life ==
Markham was the third son of Sir Robert Markham of Cotham, Nottinghamshire, and his wife, and was probably born in 1568. He was a soldier of fortune in the Low Countries, and later was a captain under the Earl of Essex's command in Ireland. He was acquainted with Latin and several modern languages, and had an exhaustive practical acquaintance with the arts of forestry and agriculture. He was a noted horse-breeder, and is said to have imported the first Arabian horse to England.

Very little is known of the events of his life. The story of the murderous quarrel between Gervase Markham and Sir John Holles related in the Biographia (s.v. Holles) has been generally connected with him, but in the Dictionary of National Biography, Sir Clements R. Markham, a descendant from the same family, refers it to another contemporary of the same name, whose monument is still to be seen in Laneham church. Gervase Markham was buried at St Giles-without-Cripplegate, London, on 3 February 1637.

== Works ==
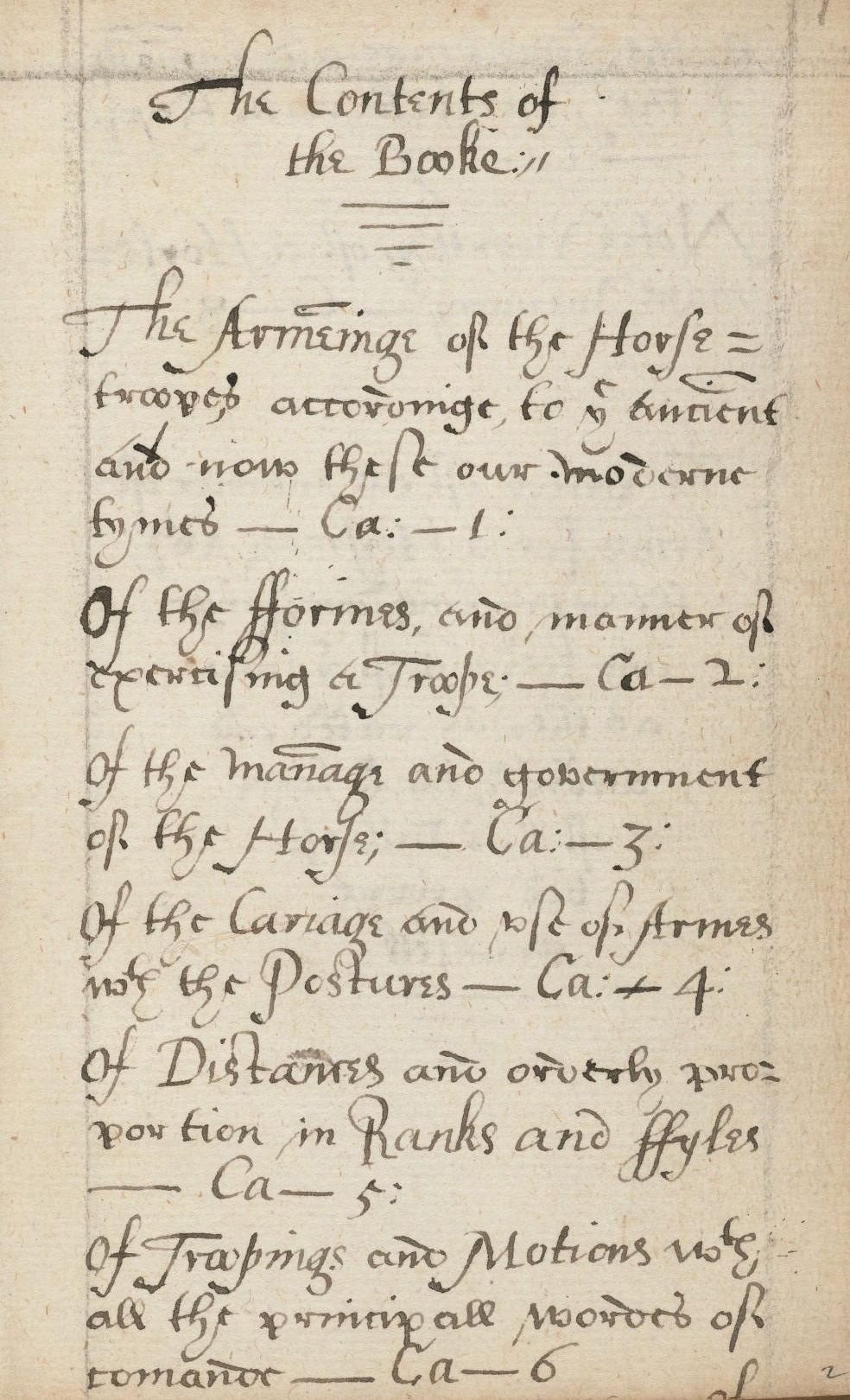
Manuscript for The cavallarie, or knowledge belonging to a captaine of horse, 1626

Markham was a voluminous writer on many subjects, but repeated himself, and sometimes reprinted books under other titles. His booksellers procured from him a declaration in 1617 that he would produce no more on certain topics.

Markham's writings include:

- 1593: A Discourse of Horsemanship, followed by other popular treatises on horsemanship and farriery;
- 1595: The Most Honorable Tragedie of Sir Richard Grinvile (1595), reprinted (1871) by Edward Arber, a prolix and euphuistic poem in eight-lined stanzas on Sir Richard Grenville;
- 1595: The Poem of Poems, or Syon's Muse, dedicated to Elizabeth, daughter of Sir Philip Sidney;
- 1597: Devoreux, Virtue's Tears;
- 1600: The Teares of the Beloved and Mary Magdalene's Tears (1601), long and rather commonplace poems on the Passion and Resurrection of Christ, both reprinted by Dr. A. B. Grosart in the Miscellanies of the Fuller Worthies Library (1871);
- 1602: A translation of the satires of Lodovico Ariosto;
- 1607: Cavelarice, or The English Horseman, featuring secrets of William Bankes, master of the performing horse Marocco;
- 1607: The English Arcadia, part 1. A sequel to Sidney's Arcadia. Part 2 appeared in 1613;
- 1608: The Dumb Knight, a comedy, with Lewis Machin;
- 1614: The Pleasures of Princes, or Good Men's Recreations. Treatises on angling and cockfighting. The first known instructional publication in the English language on raising and fighting gamecocks.
- 1615: The English Huswife;
- 1621: Hungers Preuention: or The Whole Art of Fowling By Water and Land London, Anne Holme and Thomas Langley
- 1622: Herod and Antipater, a Tragedy, written with William Sampson;
- 1624: Honor in his Perfection, in praise of the earls of Oxford, Southampton and Essex;
- 1625: Soldier's Accidence turns his military experiences to account;
- 1634: The Art of Archerie, Shewing how it is most necessary in these times for this Kingdom, both in Peace and War, and how it may be done without Charge to the Country, Trouble to the People, or any Hindrance to Necessary Occasions. Also, of the Discipline, the Postures, and whatsoever else is necessary for the attaining to the Art (London, Ben Fisher, at the Signe of the Talbot without Alders Gate, 1634)

Markham edited the Book of Saint Albans sometimes attributed to Juliana Berners, under the title of The Gentleman's Academy (1595). He produced numerous books on husbandry, many of which are catalogued in William Thomas Lowndes's Bibliographer's Manual (Bohn's ed., 1857–1864).

== Sources ==
- Michael R. Best (editor), The English Housewife, Toronto: McGill-Queen's University Press, 1986. ISBN 0-7735-0582-2.
- Frederick Noël Lawrence Poynter, A Bibliography of Gervase Markham, 1568?-1637, Oxford: Oxford Bibliographical Society, 1962.
