= Cheek by Jowl =

International theatre company

Cheek by Jowl logo.

Cheek by Jowl is an international theatre company founded in the United Kingdom by director Declan Donnellan and designer Nick Ormerod in 1981. Donnellan and Ormerod are Cheek by Jowl's artistic directors and together direct and design all of Cheek by Jowl's productions. The company's recent productions include an Italian-language version of Thomas Middleton's The Revenger's Tragedy, Russian-language productions of William Shakespeare's Measure for Measure and Francis Beaumont's The Knight of the Burning Pestle, an English-language production of The Winter's Tale and a French-language production of Shakespeare's Pericles, Prince of Tyre. Cheek by Jowl is an Arts Council England National Portfolio Organisation and an Associate Company of the Barbican Centre, London.

The company has performed in the UK since 1981 and internationally since 1984, when its productions of Vanity Fair and Pericles were invited to the Almagro, Valladolid, and Jerusalem festivals. Between 1985 and 1993, Cheek by Jowl performed 13 productions at the Donmar Warehouse. This marked the company's West End debut, which led Cheek by Jowl to receive 4 Laurence Olivier awards out of 10 nominations. As of 2017, Cheek by Jowl has performed in over 400 cities in over 40 countries, including Peter Brook's Bouffes du Nord in Paris, the Chekhov International Festival in Moscow and New York's Brooklyn Academy of Music.

The core of Cheek by Jowl's work has always been Shakespeare; by the time of their production of The Winter's Tale in 2015, Cheek by Jowl had produced thirteen of Shakespeare's plays. The company has also consistently produced other classical works of European drama, both in translation and in their original language. Cheek by Jowl have given the British premiere of 10 works of European classics, including Le Cid, by Pierre Corneille and Andromaque, by Jean Racine. In 1989, Cheek by Jowl also produced Donnellan's own play Lady Betty, which was based on the true story of a hangwoman in the West of Ireland around the time of the French Revolution.

Cheek by Jowl is notable for producing work in English, Spanish, French, and Russian.

== Cheek by Jowl in Russia ==
In 1999, the Russian Chekhov International Theatre Festival commissioned Donnellan and Ormerod to form their own company of Russian actors in Moscow. This sister company performs in Russia and internationally. Cheek by Jowl's latest Russian production Measure for Measure is the company's first co-production with Moscow's Pushkin Theatre.

== Cheek by Jowl in France ==
In 2007, Paris based theatre director Peter Brook invited Donnellan and Ormerod to form a company of French actors; together with Paris’ Bouffes du Nord theatre, Cheek by Jowl co-produced Andromaque, which toured throughout Europe in 2008 and 2009. In 2012, using this same company of French actors Cheek by Jowl went on to produce Alfred Jarry’s Ubu Roi. In 2018, with this French ensemble, Cheek by Jowl produced its first Shakespeare play in the French language: Pericles, Prince of Tyre.

In 2014, Cheek by Jowl celebrated the 20th anniversary of their As You Like It revival with a screening of the production in the Noël Coward Theatre in London, formerly the Albery Theatre, one of the venues where the revival toured to in 1994 and 1995. The production was filmed, and screened with permission from the Victoria and Albert Museum’s Theatre and Performance Archive. The screening was attended by director Declan Donnellan and designer Nick Ormerod, as well as actor Adrian Lester, who played Rosalind in the production. The play originally opened in 1991 with an all-male cast, touring to, amongst others, New York, Tokyo, Belfast, Adelaide and Rio de Janeiro.

Cheek by Jowl's production of John Ford's Tis Pity She's a Whore opened in Sceaux, Paris, in 2011 and was revived three times between 2011 and 2014. The production, described as 'electrifying' by The Independent, toured around the world, including the Barbican Centre in London, the Holland Festival in Amsterdam and the International Shakespeare Festival in Romania. Many of the company's most recent productions, including Ubu Roi (2013–16), Measure for Measure (2013–17), and The Winter's Tale (2016–2017), have been livestreamed for free to audiences across the world.

== Productions ==
- 2025 - The Two Gentlemen of Verona, by William Shakespeare
- 2024 - ACTING, a film by Sophie Fiennes documenting Cheek by Jowl
- 2024 - Medea, by Euripides
- 2024 - Hamlet, by William Shakespeare
- 2022 - Life is a Dream, by Pedro Calderón de la Barca
- 2022 - Oedipus, by Sophocles
- 2019 – The Revenger's Tragedy, by Thomas Middleton
- 2019 – The Knight of the Burning Pestle, by Francis Beaumont
- 2018 – Périclès, Prince de Tyr, by William Shakespeare
- 2016 – The Winter's Tale, by William Shakespeare
- 2014 – 'Tis Pity She's a Whore, by John Ford
- 2013 – Measure for Measure, by William Shakespeare
- 2013 – Ubu Roi, by Alfred Jarry
- 2012 – 'Tis Pity She's a Whore, by John Ford
- 2011 – The Tempest, by William Shakespeare
- 2009 – Macbeth, by William Shakespeare – performed again in 2010 and 2011
- 2008 – Troilus and Cressida, by William Shakespeare
- 2007 – Cymbeline, by William Shakespeare
- 2006 – The Changeling, by Thomas Middleton and William Rowley
- 2005 – Three Sisters, by Anton Chekhov – performed again in 2006, 2007, 2008, 2009, 2010 and 2011
- 2004 – Othello, by William Shakespeare
- 2002 – Homebody / Kabul, by Tony Kushner – British premiere
- 2000 – Boris Godunov by Alexander Pushkin
- 1998 – Much Ado About Nothing, by William Shakespeare
- 1997 – Out Cry, by Tennessee Williams – British premiere
- 1995 – The Duchess of Malfi, by John Webster
- 1994 – Measure for Measure, by William Shakespeare
- 1993 – Don't Fool With Love, by Alfred de Musset
- 1993 – The Blind Men, by Michel de Ghelderode – British premiere
- 1991 – As You Like It, by William Shakespeare – revival in 1994
- 1990 – Hamlet, by William Shakespeare
- 1990 – Sara, by Gotthold Lessing – British premiere
- 1989 – Lady Betty, by Declan Donnellan – British premiere
- 1989 – The Doctor of Honour, by Pedro Calderon – British premiere
- 1988 – The Tempest, by William Shakespeare – performed again in 2011
- 1988 – Philoctetes, by Sophocles
- 1988 – A Family Affair, by Alexander Ostrovsky – British premiere
- 1987 – Macbeth, by William Shakespeare
- 1986 – Twelfth Night, by William Shakespeare
- 1986 – Le Cid, by Pierre Corneille – British premiere
- 1985 – The Man of Mode, by George Etherege
- 1985 – A Midsummer Night's Dream, by William Shakespeare
- 1985 – Andromache, by Jean Racine – British premiere
- 1984 – Pericles, by William Shakespeare
- 1983 – Vanity Fair, by William Makepeace Thackeray – British premiere; performed again in 1984 and 1985
- 1982 – Othello, by William Shakespeare
- 1981 – The Country Wife, by William Wycherly
