= Declan Donnellan =

British theatre director (born 1953)

Declan Donnellan OBE
- Born: Michael Declan Martin Donnellan; 4 August 1953 (age 73); Manchester, Lancashire, England
- Education: St Benedict's School, Ealing; Queens' College, Cambridge
- Occupations: Director; Author
- Years active: 1981–present

Declan Michael Martin Donnellan OBE (born 4 August 1953) is an English film/stage director and author. He co-founded the Cheek by Jowl theatre company with Nick Ormerod in 1981. In addition to his Cheek by Jowl productions, Donnellan has made theatre, opera and ballet with a variety of companies across the world. In 1992, he received an honorary degree from the University of Warwick and in 2004 he was made a Chevalier de l'Ordre des Arts et des Lettres for his work in France. In 2010, he was made an honorary fellow of Goldsmiths' College, University of London. Donnellan was appointed Officer of the Order of the British Empire (OBE) in the 2017 Birthday Honours for services to theatre.

== Life and career ==
Donnellan was born in Manchester and grew up in Ealing, London. He was educated at St Benedict's School, Ealing and Queens' College, Cambridge, where he read English and Law. After leaving Cambridge, he was called to the Bar at Middle Temple in 1978.

He founded Cheek by Jowl with Nick Ormerod in 1981. Since 2006 the company has been part of the Barbican's International Theatre Program (BITE) resulting in co-productions of The Changeling (2006), Cymbeline (2007) and Troilus and Cressida (2008). He has directed plays at the Royal Shakespeare Company, the English National Opera, the Old Vic and the Bolshoi Ballet, among others.

For the Royal Shakespeare Company he has directed The School for Scandal, King Lear (Academy 2002) and an adaptation of Great Expectations (2005) with Nick Ormerod. The cast of Great Expectations included Gwendoline Christie and Sian Phillips. He has also directed Le Cid for the Avignon Festival, Falstaff for the Salzburg Festival and the ballet of Romeo and Juliet for the Bolshoi Theatre in Moscow. Other work in Russia includes The Winter's Tale for the Maly Drama Theatre of Saint Petersburg.

In 1989, Donnellan was made Associate Director of the Royal National Theatre in London where his productions have included Fuenteovejuna, The Mandate and Sweeney Todd: The Demon Barber of Fleet Street (1993) The cast of Sweeny Todd included Alun Armstrong, Adrian Lester and Julia McKenzie. In 1993 Donnellan directed both parts of Angels in America, after having previously directed the play’s first part Millennium Approaches at the National’s Cottesloe Theatre in 1991. In 1993 the play’s second part, Perestroika, received its London debut at the National Theatre and was played in repertory with Millennium Approaches, starring Daniel Craig and Jason Isaacs.

In 2000 he formed a company of actors in Moscow, under the auspices of The Chekhov Festival, whose productions include Boris Godunov, Twelfth Night and Three Sisters. He wrote a play, Lady Betty, which was performed by Cheek by Jowl in 1989. He has also adapted Don't Fool with Love by Alfred de Musset, Antigone by Sophocles, The Mandate by Nikolai Erdman and Masquerade by Mikhail Lermontov. First published in Russian in 2001, Donnellan's book, The Actor and the Target, was published in English in 2002 (reprinted 2005), and has since appeared in 15 languages, including French, Spanish, Italian, German, Romanian and Mandarin.

He directed the 1992 short The Big Fish which starred Fiona Shaw. He directed the 2012 film Bel Ami, an adaption of the Maupassant novel; the film starred Robert Patinson, Uma Thurman, Kristin Scott Thomas, Christina Ricci and Colm Meaney.

Donnellan has won awards in London, Paris, New York and Moscow, including Laurence Olivier Awards for:

- 1987 Best Director for Le Cid, Twelfth Night and Macbeth
- 1989/90 The Observer Award for Outstanding Achievement for Fuenteovejuna
- 1994 Best Director of a Musical for Sweeney Todd: The Demon Barber of Fleet Street
- 1995 Best Director of a Play for As You Like It

In February 2004 he was made a Chevalier de l'Ordre des Arts et des Lettres for his work in France, and in 2009 he shared the Charlemagne award with Craig Venter and Archbishop Desmond Tutu.

In 2014, Donnellan directed the stage play of Shakespeare in Love (play) at the Noël Coward Theatre. The play was adapted for stage by Lee Hall (playwright) from the screenplay by Tom Stoppard and Marc Norman and produced by Disney Theatrical Productions and Sonia Friedman Productions. The production was designed by Donnellan’s co-Artistic Director of Cheek by Jowl theatre company, Nick Ormerod. The original cast included David Oakes as Christopher Marlowe, Paul Chahidi as Philip Henslowe and Anna Carteret as Elizabeth I. .

In 2016, Donnellan won the Golden Lion of Venice for lifetime achievement in theatre at the Venice Biennale.

In 2024, Donnellan released his follow up to The Actor and the Target, The Actor and the Space.

In 2025, Donnellan received the Royal Order of Isabella the Catholic for lifetime contributions to Spanish theatre and culture.

== Stage productions ==
=== Cheek by Jowl ===
- 1981 The Country Wife (William Wycherley)
- 1982 Othello (William Shakespeare)
- 1983 Vanity Fair adapted by Donnellan from William Makepeace Thackeray – premiere
- 1984 Pericles (William Shakespeare)
- 1985 A Midsummer Night's Dream (William Shakespeare)
- 1985 Andromache (Jean Racine) – British premiere
- 1985 The Man of Mode (George Etherege)
- 1986 Le Cid (Pierre Corneille) – British premiere
- 1986 Twelfth Night (William Shakespeare)
- 1987 Macbeth (William Shakespeare)
- 1988 A Family Affair (Alexander Ostrovsky) – British premiere
- 1988 Philoctetes (Sophocles)
- 1988 The Tempest (William Shakespeare)
- 1989 Lady Betty (Declan Donnellan) – British premiere
- 1989 The Doctor of Honour (El médico de su honra) (Pedro Calderon) – British premiere
- 1990 Hamlet (William Shakespeare)
- 1990 Sara (Gotthold Ephraim Lessing) – British premiere
- 1991 As You Like It (William Shakespeare)
- 1993 Don't Fool With Love (Alfred de Musset)
- 1993 The Blind Men (Michel de Ghelderode) – British premiere
- 1994 As You Like It (William Shakespeare) – revival
- 1994 Measure for Measure (William Shakespeare)
- 1995 The Duchess of Malfi (John Webster)
- 1997 Out Cry (Tennessee Williams) – British premiere
- 1998 Much Ado About Nothing (William Shakespeare)
- 1999 Antigone adapted by Donnellan
- 2002 Homebody/Kabul (Tony Kushner) – British premiere
- 2004 Othello (William Shakespeare)
- 2005 Great Expectations (adapted from Charles Dickens)
- 2006 The Changeling (Thomas Middleton and William Rowley)
- 2007 Cymbeline (William Shakespeare)
- 2007 Three Sisters (Anton Chekhov)
- 2008 Boris Godunov (Alexander Pushkin)
- 2008 Troilus and Cressida (William Shakespeare)
- 2009 Macbeth (William Shakespeare)
- 2011 'Tis Pity She's a Whore (John Ford)
- 2013 Ubu Roi (Alfred Jarry)
- 2014 Measure for Measure (William Shakespeare)
- 2015 The Winter's Tale (William Shakespeare)
- 2018 Pericles, Prince of Tyre (William Shakespeare)
- 2018 The Revenger's Tragedy (Thomas Middleton)
- 2019 The Knight of the Burning Pestle (Francis Beaumont)
- 2022 Oedipus (Sophocles)
- 2022 Life is a Dream (Pedro Calderón de la Barca)
- 2024 Hamlet (William Shakespeare)
- 2024 Medea (Euripides)
- 2025 The Two Gentlemen of Verona (William Shakespeare)

=== Other ===
- 1990 Peer Gynt, Royal National Theatre
- 1993 Sweeney Todd: The Demon Barber of Fleet Street, Royal National Theatre
- 1996 Martin Guerre, West End
- 1999 Hay Fever, Savoy Theatre
- 2000 Boris Godunov at the Moscow Art Theatre
- 2002 King Lear with the RSC Academy Company
- 2005 Great Expectations, with the RSC, a new adaptation by Declan Donnellan and Nick Ormerod
- The Winter's Tale for the Maly Theater of St Petersburg
- Le Cid at the Avignon Festival with French actors
- Falstaff at the Salzburg Festival
- Bel Ami
- 2014 Shakespeare in Love, Noël Coward Theatre
- 2015 Hamlet, Bolshoi Theatre
- 2024 ACTING, a film by Sophie Fiennes documenting Cheek by Jowl's rehearsal room

== Bibliography ==
- Donnellan, D. The Actor and the Target (English edition) Nick Hern Books, London, 2002 (ISBN 1-85459-127-4)
- Donnellan, D. The Actor and the Space (English Edition), Nick Hern Books, London, 2024 (ISBN 978-1-83904-300-0)
- Approaching the Millennium: Essays on Angels in America, eds. Deborah R. Geis and Steven F. Kruger University of Michigan Press, Ann Arbor, Michigan, 1997 (ISBN 0-472-09623-0)
- Reade, Simon. Cheek by Jowl: Ten Years of Celebration, Oberon Books (hardback) 1991 (ISBN 0-948230-47-9) – currently out of print
- Irvin, Polly. Directing the Stage, RotoVision, Hove, 2003 (ISBN 2-88046-661-X)
- In Contact With the Gods?, Directors Talk Theatre, eds. Maria M. Delgado & Paul Heritage, Manchester University Press, Manchester, 1996 (ISBN 0-7190-4763-3)
- National Theatre Platform Papers No. 2 on Angels in America, National Theatre Publications Department
- National Theatre Platform Papers, Declan Donnellan Talks About his Book, The Actor and the Target, National Theatre Publications Department, London, 24 January 2003
- On Directing, eds. Mary Luckhurst and Gabriella Giannachi, Faber, London 1999 (ISBN 0-571-19149-5)
- Albricker, Vinícius. "A fala cênica sob o entrelaçamento dos princípios e procedimentos de Konstantin Stanislávski e Declan Donnellan., Belo Horizonte: Masters dissertation (Mestrado em Arte e Tecnologia da Imagem) – Escola de Belas Artes, Federal University of Minas Gerais, 2014.
- Albricker, Vinícius. Variações rítmicas vivas na atuação cênica. Orientador: Ernani de Castro Maletta. 2019. Tese (Doutorado em Artes) – Escola de Belas Artes, Universidade Federal de Minas Gerais, Belo Horizonte Federal University of Minas Gerais, 2019. Disponível em: https://repositorio.ufmg.br/handle/1843/30684

== See also ==
- List of theatre directors in the 20th and 21st centuries
