= 2015 WhatsOnStage Awards =

British theatre awards

The WhatsOnStage Awards, founded in 2001 as the Theatregoers' Choice Awards, are a fan-driven set of awards organised by the theatre website WhatsOnStage.com, based on a popular vote recognising performers and productions of English theatre, with an emphasis on London's West End theatre.

The 2015 Whatsonstage Award winners and nominees were:

Best New Play	Best New Musical
Shakespeare in Love; Great Britain; King Charles III; The Nether; Wolf Hall	Memphis; Here Lies Love; Made in Dagenham; Sunny Afternoon; Urinetown
Best Play Revival	Best Musical Revival
Coriolanus; Blithe Spirit; The Crucible; Richard II; A Streetcar Named Desire	Miss Saigon; Evita; The Pajama Game; Porgy and Bess; Sweeney Todd
Best Actor in a Play	Best Actress in a Play
David Tennant – Richard II; Mark Strong – A View From the Bridge; Richard Armitage – The Crucible; Tom Bateman – Shakespeare in Love; Tom Hiddleston – Coriolanus	Billie Piper – Great Britain; Gillian Anderson – A Streetcar Named Desire; Helen McCrory – Medea; Imelda Staunton – Good People; Lucy Briggs-Owen – Shakespeare in Love
Best Actor in a Musical	Best Actress in a Musical
Jon Jon Briones – Miss Saigon; Alistair Brammer – Miss Saigon; Killian Donnelly – Memphis; Marti Pellow – Evita; Robert Lindsay – Dirty Rotten Scoundrels	Eva Noblezada – Miss Saigon; Beverley Knight – Memphis; Gemma Arterton – Made in Dagenham; Jenna Russell – Urinetown; Madalena Alberto – Evita
Best Supporting Actor in a Play	Best Supporting Actress in a Play
Mark Gatiss – Coriolanus; Adrian Schiller – The Crucible; David Oakes – Shakespeare in Love; Hadley Fraser – Coriolanus; Nathaniel Parker – Wolf Hall & Bring Up the Bodies	Vanessa Kirby – A Streetcar Named Desire; Anna Madeley – The Crucible; Deborah Findlay – Coriolanus; Nicola Walker – A View From the Bridge; Samantha Colley – The Crucible
Best Supporting Actor in a Musical	Best Supporting Actress in a Musical
Kwang-Ho Hong – Miss Saigon; Ben Forster – Evita; George Maguire – Sunny Afternoon; Hugh Maynard – Miss Saigon; Rolan Bell – Memphis	Rachelle Ann Go – Miss Saigon; Claire Machin – Memphis; Karis Jack – Urinetown; Katherine Kingsley – Dirty Rotten Scoundrels; Samantha Bond – Dirty Rotten Scoundrels
Best Direction	Best Choreography
Laurence Connor – Miss Saigon; Christopher Ashley – Memphis; Gregory Doran – Richard II; Jamie Lloyd – Urinetown; Yaël Farber – The Crucible	Bob Avian & Geoffrey Garratt – Miss Saigon; Ann Yee – Urinetown; Drew McOnie – In the Heights; Jerry Mitchell – Dirty Rotten Scoundrels; Sergio Trujillo – Memphis
Best Set Design	Best Lighting Design
Totie Driver & Matt Kinley – Miss Saigon; Bunny Christie – Made in Dagenham; David Gallo – Memphis; Nick Ormerod – Shakespeare in Love; Soutra Gilmour – Urinetown	Mark Henderson – Coriolanus; Adam Silverman – Urinetown; Bruno Poet – Miss Saigon; Howell Binkley – Memphis; Jon Clark – Made in Dagenham
Best Off-West End Production	Best Regional Production
Sweeney Todd – Twickenham Theatre; Dogfight – Southwark Playhouse; Forbidden Broadway – Menier Chocolate Factory; In the Heights – Southwark Playhouse; Oh, the Humanity and Other Good Intentions – Tabard Theatre	Oliver! – Sheffield Crucible; Guys and Dolls – Chichester Festival Theatre; Gypsy – Chichester Festival Theatre; The Kite Runner – Nottingham Playhouse; Water Babies – Curve Leicester
Best Takeover In A Role	Best West End Show
Kerry Ellis – Wicked; Jennifer DiNoia – Wicked; Craige Els – Matilda; David Hunter – Once; Michael Watson – Jersey Boys	Miss Saigon; Les Misérables; Matilda; Memphis; Wicked
