= 'Tis Pity She's a Whore =

1633 play by John Ford

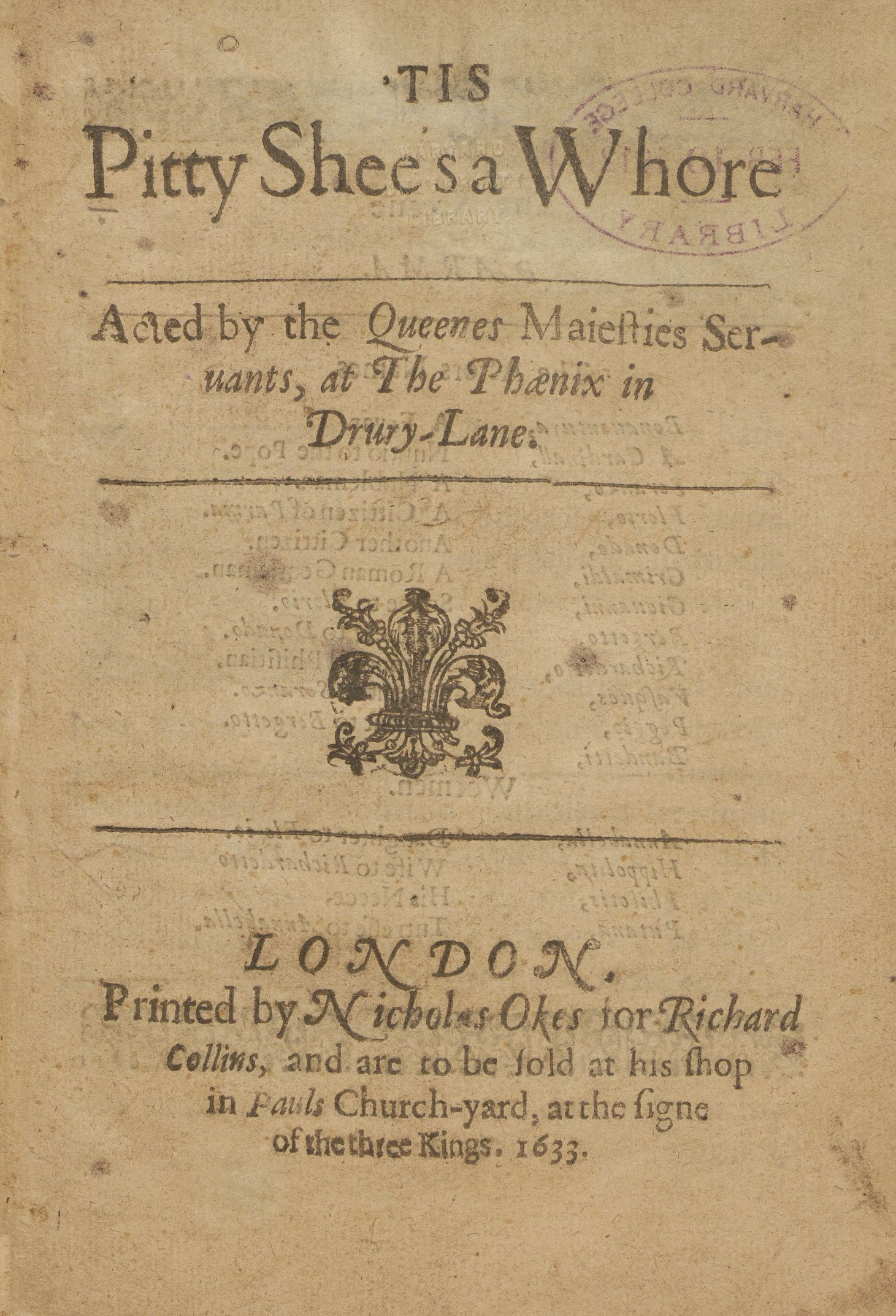
- Title page from 1633 printing
- Original language: English
- Written by: John Ford
- Characters: Friar Bonaventura; A Cardinal; Soranzo; Florio; Donado; Grimaldi; Giovanni; Bergetto; Richardetto; Vasques; Poggio; Banditti (Bandit); Officers; Annabella; Hippolita; Philotis; Putana
- Genre: Tragedy

Premiere
- Date: between 1629 and 1633
- Place: England

'Tis Pity She's a Whore (original spelling: 'Tis Pitty Shee's a Who[o]re) is a tragedy written by John Ford. It was first performed c. 1626 or between 1629 and 1633, by Queen Henrietta's Men at the Cockpit Theatre. The play was first published in 1633, in a quarto printed by Nicholas Okes for the bookseller Richard Collins. Ford dedicated the play to John Mordaunt, 1st Earl of Peterborough and Baron of Turvey.

== Plot ==
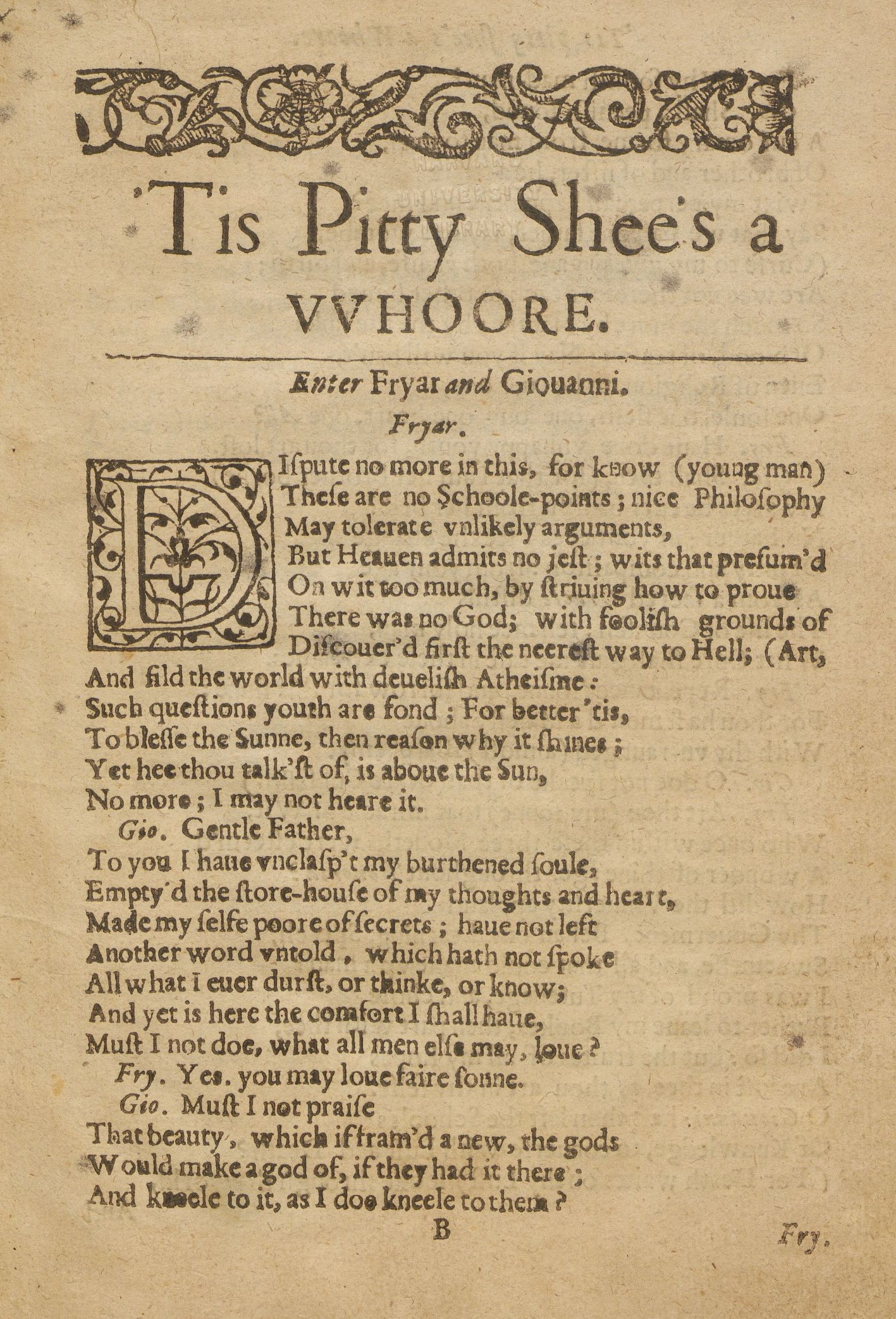
Page from a 1633 printed edition

Giovanni, who has recently returned to Parma from University in Bologna, developed an incestuous love for his sister Annabella. The play opens with his discussing this ethical problem with Friar Bonaventura. Bonaventura tries to convince Giovanni that his desires are evil despite Giovanni's passionate reasoning. He eventually persuades him to try to rid himself of his feelings through repentance.

Annabella is being approached by a number of suitors, including Bergetto, Grimaldi and Soranzo but is not interested in any of them. Giovanni finally tells her how he feels (obviously having failed in his attempts to repent) and she tells him she feels the same about him. Annabella's tutoress, Putana (literally meaning 'whore' in Italian) encourages the relationship. The siblings consummate their relationship.

Hippolita, a past lover of Soranzo, verbally attacks him, furious with him for letting her send her husband, Richardetto, on a dangerous journey she believed would result in his death so that they could be together, then declining his vows and abandoning her. Soranzo leaves and accuses Hippolita for being a horrible person. Soranzo's servant Vasques then promises to help Hippolita get revenge on Soranzo. The pair agree to marry after murdering him.

After this, we find out that Richardetto is not dead but also in Parma in disguise as a doctor with his niece Philotis. Richardetto is also desperate for revenge against Soranzo and Hippolita. He convinces Grimaldi to stab Soranzo with a poisoned sword in order to win Annabella. Bergetto and Philotis, now betrothed, are planning to marry secretly in the place Richardetto orders Grimaldi to wait. Grimaldi mistakenly stabs and kills Bergetto, leaving Philotis, Poggio (Bergetto's servant) and Donado (Bergetto's uncle) distraught.

Annabella resigns herself to marrying Soranzo, knowing she has to marry someone other than her brother. She subsequently falls ill, and it is revealed that she is pregnant. Friar Bonaventura then persuades her to marry Soranzo before her pregnancy becomes apparent. Donado and Florio (father of Annabella and Giovanni) go to the cardinal's house, where Grimaldi has been in hiding, to beg for justice. The cardinal refuses, owing to Grimaldi's high status, and instead sends him back to Rome. Florio tells Donado to wait for God to bring them justice.

Annabella and Soranzo are married soon after, and their ceremony includes masque dancers, one of whom reveals herself to be Hippolita. She claims to be willing to drink a toast with Soranzo and the two raise their glasses and drink, on which she explains that her plan was to poison his wine. Vasques then comes forward and reveals that he was always loyal to his master, and he poisoned Hippolita. She dies spouting insults and damning prophecies to the newlyweds. Seeing the effects of anger and revenge, Richardetto abandons his plans and sends Philotis off to a convent to save her soul.

When Soranzo discovers Annabella's pregnancy, the two argue until Annabella realizes that Soranzo truly did love her and finds herself consumed with guilt. She is confined to her room by her husband, who plots with Vasques to avenge himself against his cheating wife and her unknown lover. On Soranzo's exit, Putana comes onto the stage and Vasques pretends to befriend her to gain the name of Annabella's baby's father. Once Putana reveals that it is Giovanni, Vasques gets bandits to tie her up and put out her eyes as punishment for the terrible acts she has willingly overseen and encouraged. In her room, Annabella writes a letter to her brother in her own blood, warning him that Soranzo knows and will soon seek revenge. The Friar Bonaventura delivers the letter, but Giovanni is too arrogant to believe he can be harmed and chooses to attend Soranzo's birthday feast despite his sister's warning. The friar subsequently flees Parma to avoid further involvement in Giovanni's downfall.

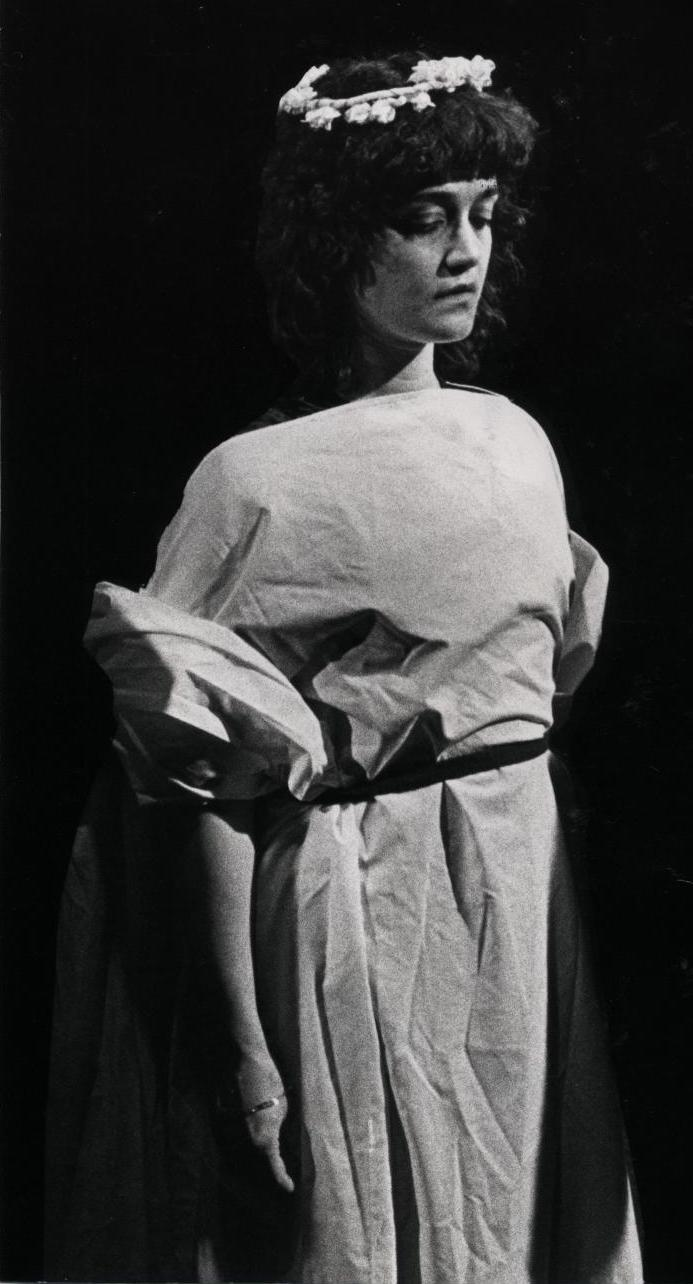
Angelique Rockas as Annabella in New Theatre production directed by Declan Donnelan, London 1980

On the day of the feast, Giovanni visits Annabella in her room and, after talking with her, stabs her during a kiss. He then enters the feast, at which all remaining characters are present, wielding a dagger on which his sister's heart is skewered and tells everyone of the incestuous affair. Florio dies immediately from shock. Soranzo attacks Giovanni verbally and Giovanni stabs and kills him. Vasques intervenes, wounding Giovanni before ordering the bandits to finish the job. Following the massacre, the cardinal orders Putana to be burnt at the stake, Vasques to be banished and the church to seize all the wealth and property belonging to the dead. Richardetto finally reveals his true identity to Donado and the play ends with the cardinal saying of Annabella "who could not say, 'Tis pity she's a whore?".

== Characters ==
- Men
  - Friar Bonaventura – A friar and Giovanni's mentor
  - A Cardinal – Nuncio to the Pope
  - Soranzo – A nobleman (Annabella's suitor and eventual husband)
  - Florio – A citizen of Parma, and father of Annabella and Giovanni
  - Donado – A citizen of Parma, and uncle of Bergetto
  - Grimaldi – A Roman gentleman (Annabella's suitor)
  - Giovanni – Son of Florio (his name is pronounced with four syllables)
  - Bergetto – Nephew of Donado (Annabella's suitor and then Philotis's fiancé/suitor)
  - Richardetto – Hippolita's husband, disguised as a physician, also Philotis' uncle
  - Vasques – Loyal servant to Soranzo
  - Poggio – Servant to Bergetto
  - Banditti – Outlaws, a criminal mob
  - Officers
- Women
  - Annabella – Daughter of Florio
  - Hippolita – Wife of Richardetto (Soranzo's former paramour)
  - Philotis – Niece of Richardetto (becomes Bergetto's fiancée)
  - Putana – Tutoress of Annabella; her name derives from the Italian word for "whore", puttana.

== Reception ==
The play's open treatment of the subject of incest made it one of the most controversial works in English literature. The play was omitted from an 1831 collection of Ford's plays; its title has often been changed to something euphemistic such as Giovanni and Annabella or 'Tis Pity or The Brother and Sister. Until well into the twentieth century, critics were usually harsh in their condemnations of the play; the subject matter offended them, as did Ford's failure to condemn his protagonist. The Victorian art critic Vernon Lee, however, singled out the play as the best early-modern English representation of Renaissance Italy, precisely because of its combination of "abominableness" and "innocence". As critic Mark Stavig wrote, "Instead of stressing the villainy, Ford portrays Giovanni as a talented, virtuous, and noble man who is overcome by a tumultuous, unavoidable passion that brings about his destruction". Adolphus Ward said: "'Tis Pity She's a Whore has been justly recognized as a tragedy of extraordinary power". Since the mid-twentieth century, scholars and critics have generally shown more appreciation of the complexities and ambiguities of the work, though the treatment of the main subject still remains "unsettling", in the words of Michael Billington, reviewing the 2014 production for The Guardian, because Ford refuses "to either condone or condemn incest: he simply presents it as an unstoppable force".

== Notable performances ==
- The play was revived early in the Restoration era; Samuel Pepys saw a 1661 performance at the Salisbury Court Theatre. In 1894, the play was translated into French by Maurice Maeterlinck and produced under the title Annabella at the Théâtre de l'Œuvre.
- The play was not seen again in Britain until 1923, in a production by the Phoenix Society at the original Shaftesbury Theatre, and thereafter it was performed by the Arts Theatre Club (1934) and in two productions by Donald Wolfit in 1940 (Cambridge) and 1941 (The Strand Theatre).
- In 1980, Declan Donnellan directed the play for New Theatre Company at Theatre Space and Half Moon Theatre. The lead roles played by Malcolm Jamieson and Angelique Rockas received praise for their performances.
- In 2011, Jonathan Munby directed a "Tarantino-esque" production of the play set in 1960s Italy, staged at the West Yorkshire Playhouse in Leeds from 7 to 28 May. Featuring an image of Christ and the Virgin Mary, the publicity poster for the play caused controversy before it even opened, and was replaced after a letter of complaint from the Roman Catholic Bishop of Leeds. In the lead roles, Damien Molony as Giovanni and Sara Vickers as Annabella received praise for their performances.
- Between 2011 and 2014, theatre company Cheek by Jowl staged the play, directed by Declan Donnellan and designed by Nick Ormerod. The production went on tour to the Brooklyn Academy of Music in New York and the Barbican Centre in London, amongst others. The production was revived with different casts in 2012 and 2014. In 2011–2012, Lydia Wilson played Annabella, and the role was played by Gina Bramhill in 2012–2013 and Eve Ponsonby in 2014.
- Michael Longhurst directed a production of the play in 2014 at the Sam Wanamaker Playhouse, part of Shakespeare's Globe, making use of period costumes and Jacobean musical instruments, as well as candlelight. Fiona Button played Annabella; Noma Dumezweni played Hippolyta.

== Adaptations ==
- Dommage qu'elle soit une p... (1961), French adaptation by director Luchino Visconti, performed at the Théâtre de Paris with Romy Schneider (Annabella) and Alain Delon (Giovanni).
- My Sister, My Love (Syskonbädd 1782) (1966), film adaptation by director Vilgot Sjöman, starring Bibi Andersson and Per Oscarsson.
- 'Tis Pity She's a Whore (Addio fratello crudele) (1971), film adaptation by director Giuseppe Patroni Griffi, starring Charlotte Rampling and Oliver Tobias.
- Filmed for BBC Two by director Roland Joffé under its original title, and transmitted on 7 May 1980, production starred Kenneth Cranham (as Giovanni), Cherie Lunghi (as Annabella), and Jeremy Child (as the Priest). It used an unedited text while transferring the setting to eighteenth century England.
- A BBC Radio 3 adaptation featuring Jessie Buckley as Annabella and Damien Molony as Giovanni was adapted and directed by Pauline Harris and first broadcast on 7 January 2018.
- Schade, dass sie eine Hure war, German opera adaptation by Kerstin Maria Pöhler (libretto) and Anno Schreier (composer), world premiere on 16 February 2019, Opernhaus Düsseldorf.

== Influence ==
Peter Greenaway has said that the play provided him with the main template for his 1989 film The Cook, the Thief, His Wife & Her Lover.

The pilot episode of Midsomer Murders, "The Killings at Badger's Drift" (1997), contains references to the play.

A song with almost the same name, "'Tis a Pity She Was a Whore", is featured on David Bowie's final studio album Blackstar (2016). "Sue (Or in a Season of Crime)", from the same album, loosely recounts the play's events from Annabella's decision to marry Soranzo to Giovanni's reception of her note written in blood.

The play is referenced in Tom Stoppard's 1982 play The Real Thing.

In the third season of Party Down, Henry Pollard (Adam Scott) directs a high school version of the play.

The play is referenced in "New York", episode 5 of season 3 of the television series Interview with the Vampire.
