= Bel Ami (2012 film) =

Bel ami
- Directed by: Declan Donnellan; Nick Ormerod
- Screenplay by: Rachel Bennette
- Based on: Bel Ami by Guy de Maupassant
- Produced by: Uberto Pasolini
- Starring: Robert Pattinson; Uma Thurman; Kristin Scott Thomas; Christina Ricci; Colm Meaney; Anthony Higgins
- Cinematography: Stefano Falivene
- Edited by: Gavin Buckley; Masahiro Hirakubo
- Music by: Lakshman Joseph De Saram; Rachel Portman
- Production companies: Redwave Films; XIX Entertainment; Protagonist Pictures; Rai Cinema
- Distributed by: StudioCanal (France and United Kingdom); 01 Distribution (Italy)
- Release dates: 17 February 2012 (Berlin International Film Festival); 9 March 2012 (United Kingdom); 8 June 2012 (United States)
- Running time: 92 minutes
- Countries: United Kingdom; France; Italy
- Language: English
- Budget: €9 million
- Box office: $8 million

Bel Ami is a 2012 drama film directed by Declan Donnellan and Nick Ormerod and starring Robert Pattinson, Uma Thurman, Kristin Scott Thomas, Christina Ricci and Colm Meaney. The film is based on the 1885 French novel of the same name by Guy de Maupassant.

The film had its world premiere out of competition at the 62nd Berlin International Film Festival on 17 February 2012, and was released theatrically on 8 June 2012 by Magnolia Pictures. The film was budgeted at €9 million.

== Plot ==
Georges Duroy (Robert Pattinson) is a penniless former soldier making a living as an office clerk in 1880s Paris. At a club he meets an old friend, Charles Forestier (Philip Glenister), with whom he spent three years during the war in Algeria. The friend is well off and invites Georges to his home where he meets Mrs. Madeleine Forestier (Uma Thurman) and her friends Clotilde de Marelle (Christina Ricci) and Virginie Rousset (Kristin Scott Thomas). Mrs. Rousset's husband is an editor of the conservative newspaper La Vie Française, and she helps Georges to get a job there, initially by publishing his diaries from the war in the paper. Gradually his social and financial standing improves, with Duroy using his wit and powers of seduction to charm wealthy women.

== Cast ==
- Robert Pattinson as Georges Duroy, a former soldier turned social climber
- Uma Thurman as Madeleine Forestier
- Kristin Scott Thomas as Virginie Rousset
- Christina Ricci as Clotilde de Marelle
- Colm Meaney as Monsieur Rousset
- Philip Glenister as Charles Forestier
- Holliday Grainger as Suzanne
- Natalia Tena as Rachel the Prostitute
- James Lance as François Laroche
- Pip Torrens as Paul the Butler
- Anthony Higgins as Comte de Vaudrec

== Production ==
Hagen Bogdanski directed the principal photography which began in early February 2010 in London and Budapest. Simon Fuller who helped fund the film also served as an executive producer.

=== Casting ===
The film stars Robert Pattinson as Georges Duroy (Pattinson describes Duroy as being "completely amoral"), Uma Thurman as Madeleine Forestier, Duroy's secret love interest, and later wife, Kristin Scott Thomas as Madame Rousset, whose lover Duroy becomes to further his interests, Christina Ricci as Clotilde de Marelle, who even though married genuinely loves Duroy, and Colm Meaney as Rousset.

== Box office ==
Bel Ami earned $8,303,261 at box office.

== Reception ==
Bel Ami has received negative reviews from critics, where it currently holds a 28% rating on Rotten Tomatoes based on 94 reviews and an average rating of 4.72 out of 10 with the consensus stating, "Bel Ami contains some soapy pleasures but it overall rushes through the narrative and suffers from a vague central performance by Robert Pattinson."

Mick LaSalle in his review for San Francisco Chronicle said that "What distinguishes Pattinson in the role is the sense he conveys of someone roiling and churning beneath a surface that is almost, but not quite, calm."

However, Roger Ebert of the Chicago Sun-Times awarded it 2 stars out of 4, writing, "The women are all elegant and intelligent, they know the ways of the world, and they know Georges' history. Why do they find him attractive? We don't, and that failure is the downfall of the film." He singled out Christina Ricci for her performance: "Her character makes the mistake of actually loving Georges. This involves pure acting skill on her part, since Pattinson gives her so little to work with."

Brent Simon of Shared Darkness criticized the film for being "A gassy, self-satisfied adaptation of the 1885 novel of the same name, threadbare Parisian period piece Bel Ami belies the erroneous notion that costume dramas automatically have a higher IQ than their contemporary dramatic brethren."
