= What a Pushkin, what a son of a bitch! =

Quote from Alexander Pushkin

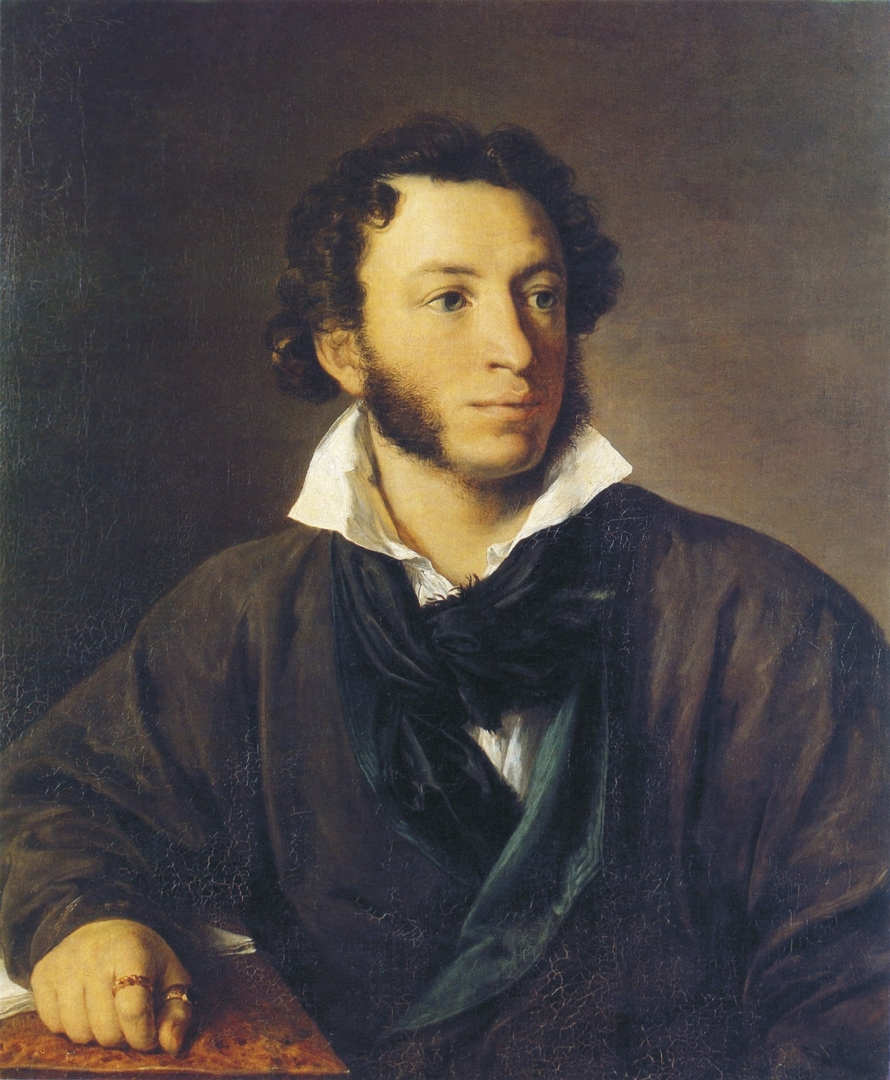
Alexander Pushkin

"What a Pushkin, what a son of a bitch!" (Russian: ай да Пушкин, ай да сукин сын!, Ay-da Pushkin, ay-da sukin syn!; sometimes separated by exclamation mark instead of comma) is a catchphrase and winged word from Alexander Pushkin's correspondence with one of his friends, poet Pyotr Vyazemsky. The phrase commonly expresses a joy after finishing one's work and appears particularly in several Russian literary works.

In a letter dated circa November 7 or beginning of October 1825 Pushkin, celebrating his finished drama Boris Godunov wrote to Vyazemsky:

I greet you, my joy, with a romantic tragedy, in which the first person is Boris Godunov! My tragedy is done; I reread it aloud, alone, and clapped my hands and shouted: What a Pushkin, what a son of a bitch!

That was preceded by what Pushkin wrote to Vyazemsky on July 13 of the same year:

My joy, for the time being I've undertook such a literary feat, for which you'll shower me with kisses: a romantic tragedy! Look out, keep silent: few people know that.

== See also ==
- Pushkin studies
