= Nick Ormerod =

British theatre designer (born 1951)

Nicholas Ronald Ormerod OBE (born 9 December 1951) is a British theatre designer and co-founder of the international theatre company Cheek by Jowl. In 1981 he founded Cheek by Jowl with Declan Donnellan, and they are the company's co-artistic directors. In addition to his Cheek by Jowl productions, Ormerod has made theatre, opera and ballet with companies across the world. He studied law at Trinity College, Cambridge before studying for BA in theatre design at the Wimbledon School of Art.

== Biography ==
Ormerod was born and grew up in London, England. He studied law at Trinity College, Cambridge before studying for a BA in theatre design at the Wimbledon School of Art. In 1981 Ormerod founded Cheek by Jowl with Declan Donnellan. The company has performed across the world, working in over 400 cities in 40 countries spanning six continents. Since 2006 Cheek by Jowl have been part of the Barbican's International Theatre Program (BITE) resulting in co-productions of The Changeling (2006), Cymbeline (2007) and Troilus and Cressida (2008).

In addition to his work with Cheek by Jowl, Ormerod designed the Royal Shakespeare Company’s productions of School for Scandal (1998) and King Lear (2002 Academy Production). In 2005, he co-wrote an adaptation of Charles Dickens’s Great Expectations (2005) for the Royal Shakespeare Company with Declan Donnellan. He designed Shakespeare's Troilus and Cressida for the Burgtheater, Vienna in 2000, and Falstaff for the Salzburg Festival in 2001. In London, Ormerod designed Hay Fever at the Savoy Theatre, and Shakespeare in Love (play) at the Noël Coward Theatre.

For the Royal National Theatre Ormerod designed both parts of Angels in America by Tony Kushner, as well as Sweeney Todd, Peer Gynt and Fuenteovejuna.

In 2000 he and Donnellan formed a company of actors in Moscow, under the auspices of The Chekhov Festival, whose productions include Boris Godunov, Twelfth Night and Three Sisters. For the Bolshoi Theatre he has designed Romeo and Juliet in 2003, and Hamlet in 2015. Other work in Russia includes The Winter's Tale for the Maly Drama Theatre of St. Petersburg in 1997. With Cheek by Jowl he and Donnellan have produced further work in Russian including The Tempest with the Chekhov Festival and Measure for Measure in a co-production with Moscow's Pushkin Theatre.

Ormerod was nominated for the Laurence Olivier Award Designer of the Year in 1988 for A Family Affair, The Tempest and Philoctetes and won the Corral de Comedias Award with Donnellan in 2008. He directed the 2012 film Bel Ami, an adaption of the Maupassant novel.

Ormerod was appointed Officer of the Order of the British Empire (OBE) in the 2017 Birthday Honours for services to theatre design.

== Stage productions ==
=== Cheek by Jowl ===
- 2025 The Two Gentlemen of Verona ... by William Shakespeare
- 2024 Medea ... by Euripides
- 2024 Hamlet ... by William Shakespeare
- 2022 Life is a Dream ... by Pedro Calderón de la Barca
- 2022 Oedipus ... by Sophocles
- 2019 The Knight of the Burning Pestle .... by Francis Beaumont
- 2018 The Revenger's Tragedy ... by Thomas Middleton
- 2018 Pericles, Prince of Tyre ... by William Shakespeare
- 2016-17 The Winter's Tale ... by William Shakespeare
- 2014 Measure for Measure ...by William Shakespeare
- 2013 Ubu Roi ... by Alfred Jarry
- 2011 Tis Pity She's a Whore ... by John Ford (dramatist)
- 2009 Macbeth ... by William Shakespeare
- 2008 Troilus and Cressida ... by William Shakespeare
- 2008 Boris Godunov ... by Aleksandr Pushkin
- 2007 Three Sisters ... by Anton Chekhov
- 2007 Cymbeline ... by William Shakespeare
- 2006 The Changeling ... by Thomas Middleton and William Rowley
- 2005 Great Expectations ... adapted from Charles Dickens
- 2004 Othello ... by William Shakespeare
- 2002 Homebody / Kabul ... by Tony Kushner ..... British premiere
- 1998 Much Ado About Nothing ... by William Shakespeare
- 1997 Out Cry ... by Tennessee Williams ..... British premiere
- 1995 The Duchess of Malfi ... by John Webster
- 1994 As You Like It (revival) ... by William Shakespeare
- 1994 Measure for Measure ... by William Shakespeare
- 1993 Don't Fool With Love ... by Alfred de Musset
- 1993 The Blind Men ... by Michel de Ghelderode ..... British premiere
- 1991 As You Like It ... by William Shakespeare
- 1990 Hamlet ... by William Shakespeare
- 1990 Sara ... by Gotthold Ephraim Lessing ... British premiere
- 1989 Lady Betty ... by Declan Donnellan ..... British premiere
- 1988 The Tempest ... by William Shakespeare
- 1988 Philoctetes ... by Sophocles
- 1988 A Family Affair ... by Alexander Ostrovsky ..... British premiere
- 1987 Macbeth ... by William Shakespeare
- 1986 Twelfth Night ... by William Shakespeare
- 1985 The Man of Mode ... by George Etherege
- 1985 A Midsummer Night's Dream ... by William Shakespeare
- 1985 Andromache ... by Jean Racine ..... British premiere
- 1984 Pericles ... by William Shakespeare
- 1983 Vanity Fair ... adapted by Donnellan from William Makepeace Thackeray ..... premiere
- 1982 Othello ... by William Shakespeare
- 1981 The Country Wife ... by William Wycherly

=== Other ===
- 2024 ACTING, a film by Sophie Fiennes documenting Cheek by Jowl's rehearsal room
- 2014 Shakespeare in Love, Noël Coward Theatre
- 2005 Great Expectations, with the RSC a new adaptation by Declan Donnellan and Nick Ormerod
- 2002 King Lear with the RSC Academy Company
- 2000 Boris Godunov at the Moscow Art Theatre
- 1996 Martin Guerre, West End
- 1993 Sweeney Todd: The Demon Barber of Fleet Street, Royal National Theatre
- The Winter's Tale for the Maly Theater of St Petersburg
- Falstaff at the Salzburg Festival

== Bibliography ==
- Approaching the Millennium: Essays on Angels in America, eds. Deborah R. Geis and Steven F. Kruger University of Michigan Press, Ann Arbor, Michigan, 1997 (ISBN 0-472-09623-0)
- Reade, Simon. Cheek by Jowl: Ten Years of Celebration, Oberon Books (hardback) 1991 (ISBN 0-948230-47-9) -- currently out of print
- In Contact With the Gods?, Directors Talk Theatre, eds. Maria M. Delgado & Paul Heritage, Manchester University Press, Manchester, 1996 (ISBN 0-7190-4763-3)
- National Theatre Platform Papers No. 2 on Angels in America, National Theatre Publications Department
