= 'Tis Pity She's a Whore (film) =

1971 film by Giuseppe Patroni Griffi, based on play

- Directed by: Giuseppe Patroni Griffi
- Screenplay by: Alfio Valdarnini; Carlo Carunchio; Giuseppe Patroni Griffi
- Based on: 'Tis Pity She's a Whore by John Ford
- Produced by: Silvio Clementelli
- Starring: Charlotte Rampling; Oliver Tobias; Fabio Testi
- Cinematography: Vittorio Storaro
- Edited by: Franco Arcalli
- Music by: Ennio Morricone
- Production company: Clesi Cinematografica
- Distributed by: Euro International Film
- Release date: September 20, 1971 (Italy)
- Running time: 140 minutes
- Countries: Italy; France

'Tis Pity She's a Whore (Italian: Addio fratello crudele, lit. 'Goodbye Cruel Brother') is a 1971 film adaptation of John Ford's tragedy. It is directed by Giuseppe Patroni Griffi, who co-wrote the screenplay, and stars Charlotte Rampling as Annabella, Oliver Tobias as Giovanni, and Fabio Testi as Soranzo. The musical score was composed by Ennio Morricone.

== Plot ==
In the city of Mantua, during the Italian Renaissance, Giovanni, the son of a propertied man, is sent to study abroad having never met his sister, Annabella, who is a couple of years younger than him. After ten years of separation, the now beautiful Annabella is reunited with her brother for the first time, as adolescents. The young siblings are immediately attracted and cannot help falling in love with each other. After struggling with their feelings for some time Giovanni and Annabella begin a secret relationship, and she becomes pregnant. Knowing that the world will condemn them, Giovanni leaves his father's villa, and Annabella accepts the marriage proposal of her suitor, the wealthy noble Soranzo. After Soranzo discovers that he has been the object of a deception, he makes plans for a bloody vengeance.

== Cast ==
- Charlotte Rampling as Annabella
- Oliver Tobias as Giovanni
- Fabio Testi as Soranzo
- Antonio Falsi as Friar Bonaventura
- Rik Battaglia as Mercante
- Angela Luce as Mercante's governess
- Rino Imperio as Soranzo's servant

== Reception ==
Italian film critic Marco Giusti writes that Rampling undresses as much as she can, but that it is Fabio Testi's physique that is imposing: Always naked and often framed at the height of his buttocks, it is causing the spectators some embarrassment. Giusti perfectly remembers the sight of Testi's big hairy buttocks on the screen of the cinema Verdi in Genoa. However, Teo Mora "forced" Giusti and Enrico Ghezzi to stage it at the Teatro dell'Archivolto in Genoa. Giusti acted as Soranzo, Testi's character; he has not done any theatre since.

=== Accolades ===
The film received two Nastro d'Argento Award nominations; Best Cinematography (Vittorio Storaro) and Best Production Design (Mario Ceroli).

== Bibliography ==
- Giusti, Marco (1999). dizionario dei film italiani STRACULT [sic]. Cles: Sterling & Kupfer. ISBN 88-200-2919-7.
