= Giuseppe Patroni Griffi =

Italian playwright, screenwriter, director, and author

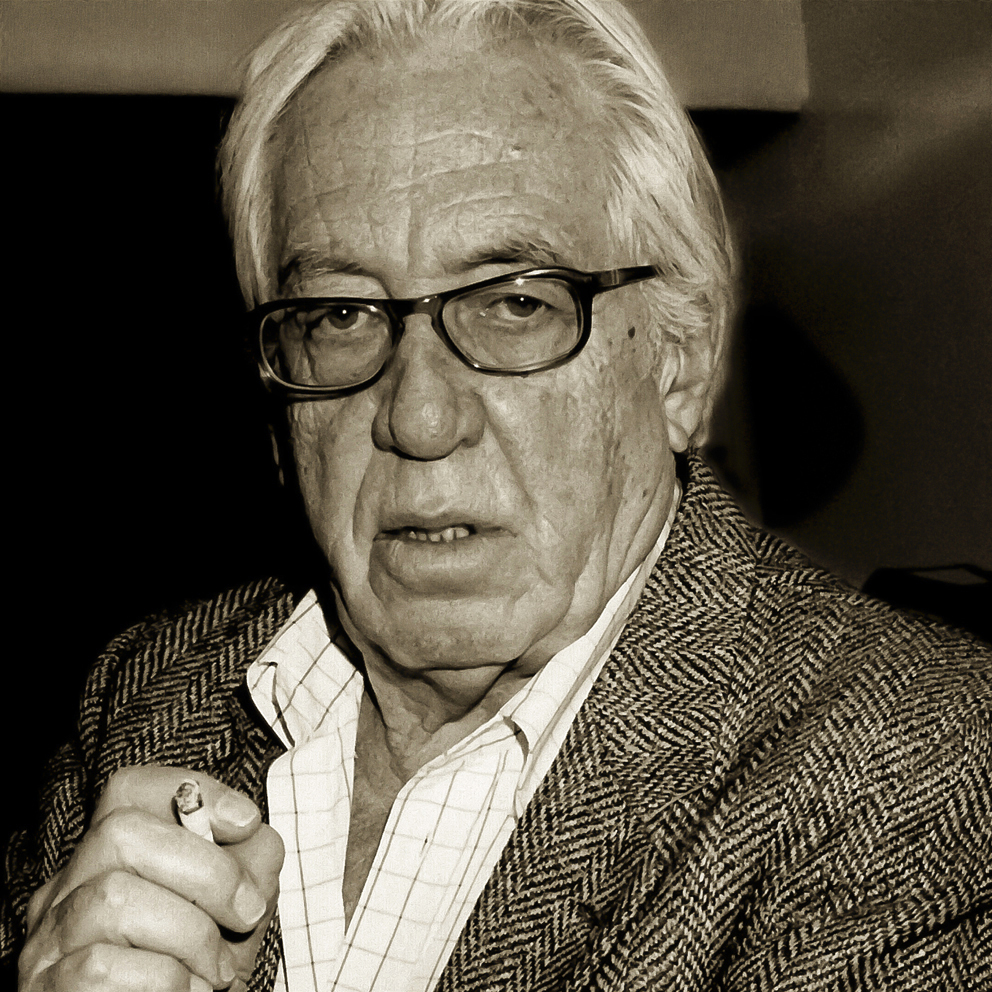
- Giuseppe Patroni Griffi in 1995, photographed by Augusto De Luca
- Born: 26 February 1921; Naples, Italy
- Died: 15 December 2005 (aged 84); Rome, Italy
- Occupations: Film director, playwright, screenwriter, author

Giuseppe Patroni Griffi (26 February 1921 – 15 December 2005) was an Italian playwright, screenwriter, director and author.

He was born in Naples in an aristocratic family and moved to Rome immediately after the end of World War II in Europe and spent his professional life there. Patroni Griffi is considered one of the most prominent contributors to Italian theater and film in post-war Italy.

Roberto Rossellini made a film from his play Anima nera.

His first listed film writing credit was on the 1952 musical Canzoni di mezzo secolo. Patroni Griffi would later direct Charlotte Rampling, Elizabeth Taylor, Marcello Mastroianni, Laura Antonelli, Florinda Bolkan, Terence Stamp, Fabio Testi.

Patroni Griffi was also involved with numerous television productions of lyric opera, including Verdi's La Traviata. His many theatrical productions include works by Pirandello, Eduardo De Filippo, Jean Cocteau and Tennessee Williams. As a writer, he published a first collection of stories in 1955, Ragazzo di Trastevere. Later, he contributed significantly to the body of Italian gay literature with Scende giù per Toledo and La morte della bellezza, both set in Naples.

He died in Rome.

== Selected filmography ==
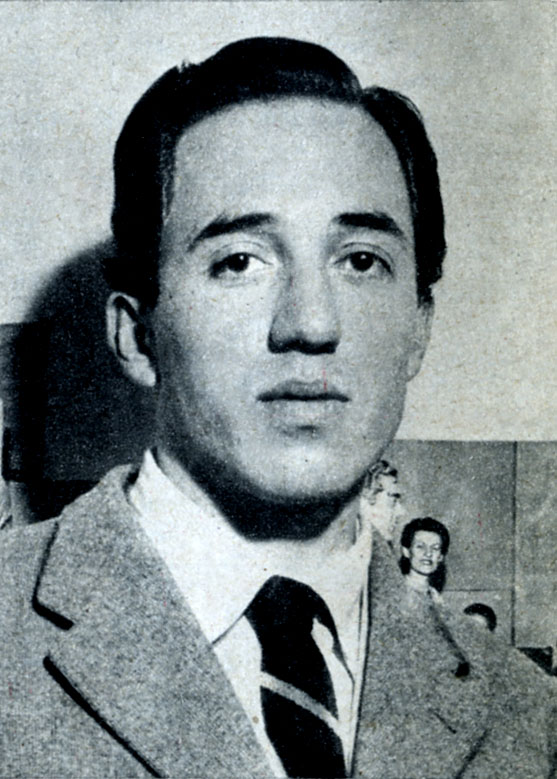
Giuseppe Patroni Griffi, 1958

As a director, he is most noted for:

- The Sea (1962)
- Metti una sera a cena (1969)
- Addio, fratello crudele (1971, film adaptation of 'Tis Pity She's a Whore with Charlotte Rampling and Oliver Tobias)
- Identikit (1974) with Elizabeth Taylor
- The Divine Nymph (1975)
- La gabbia (1985)
- La romana (1988)
- Tosca (1992)
- La traviata (2000)
