= Oliver Tobias =

Swiss-British actor and director (b. 1947)

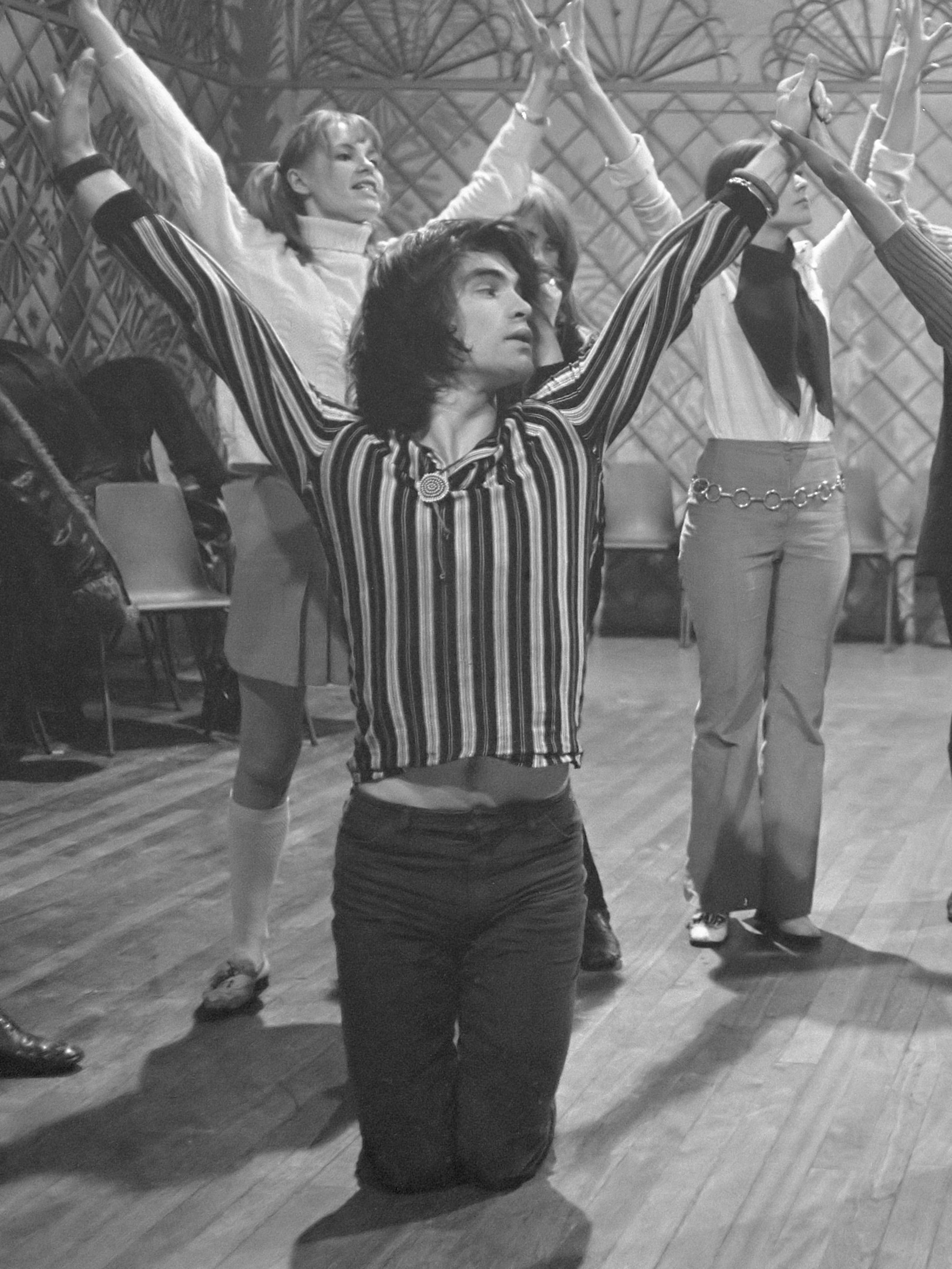
- Tobias in 1969
- Born: Oliver Tobias Freitag; 6 August 1947 (age 79); Zürich, Canton of Zurich, Switzerland
- Education: East 15 Acting School
- Years active: 1968–present
- Spouse: Arabella Zamoyska (m. 2001)
- Children: 2
- Website: www.olivertobias.co.uk (Archive from 2018)

Oliver Tobias Freitag (born 6 August 1947) is a Swiss-British actor and stage director. He is known for portraying George Berger in the West End production of the musical Hair, and to television audience for playing the title character in the 1970s ITV series Arthur of the Britons,

== Early life ==
Born in Zürich, Switzerland, he is the son of the Austrian-Swiss actor Robert Freitag and the German actress Maria Becker. He came to the United Kingdom at the age of eight and trained at East 15 Acting School, London.

== Career ==
In 1968, Tobias appeared in the original London production of Hair, playing the prime rebel role of Berger. The following year, he starred in, directed, and choreographed the rock opera in Amsterdam and, in 1970, directed a production in Tel Aviv.

Tobias's first role was in the feature film Romance of a Horsethief, co-starring with Yul Brynner, Serge Gainsbourg and Eli Wallach. He then co-starred with Charlotte Rampling in the Jacobean tragedy 'Tis Pity She's a Whore, a film directed by Giuseppe Patroni Griffi. He became popular as Arthur in the TV series Arthur of the Britons (1972). Peter Weir then directed him in the TV series Luke's Kingdom.

Many other successful films followed, including The Stud in 1978 in which he co-starred with Joan Collins. In 1981, he starred in the British television series Dick Turpin's Greatest Adventure, where he played the character Noll Bridger, a Colonial North American. Tobias also starred in Smuggler (1981) a children's drama series, set in Cornwall in 1801. Tobias also appeared as the Devil in the promotional video for Ultravox's 1982 hit "Hymn". Tobias became a frontrunner for the role of James Bond in Octopussy (1983) when Roger Moore intended to retire from the role, but Moore ultimately returned to the role.

In 1991, Tobias starred alongside Charles Gray in the sci-fi movie "Firestar – First Contact" for Ice International Films. In 1996, Tobias played Rebecque, an aide to the Prince of Orange (Paul Bettany), in Sharpe's Waterloo. In 1998, he played Bassa Selim in Mozart in Turkey. In 2000, he starred in the West End musical La Cava. Three years later, he portrayed Percival Brown in the 50th-anniversary production of The Boy Friend and the next year toured in the rock musical Footloose. In 2005, he finished shooting the film An Airfield in England. He has been acting in a variety of roles for German and Swiss TV and has recently reprised the role of Bassa Selim in Mozart's Seraglio at the Teatro Lirico in Cagliari, Italy. Tobias is famous for his voiceover work and was the narrator on the opening track of DJ Shadow's 2006 album The Outsider.

== Personal life ==
In 2001, he married Arabella Zamoyska, with whom he has two sons.

== Filmography ==
=== Film ===
1968	Hair	Role	The Musical
1969	Arthur? Arthur!	Peter "Bobo" Jackson	
1970	Romance of a Horsethief	Zanvill Kradnik	
1971	'Tis Pity She's a Whore	Giovanni	
1974	The God King	General Miara	
1975	Arthur of the Britons	King Arthur	
1978	The Stud	Tony Blake	
1979	Arabian Adventure	Prince Hasan	
1979	A Nightingale Sang in Berkeley Square	"Foxy"	
1983	The Wicked Lady	Kit Locksby	
1985	Mata Hari	Captain Georges Ladoux	
1986	Operation Nam	Richard Wagner	
1987	Johann Strauss: The King Without a Crown	Johann Strauss	
1988	The Choice	Unknown	
1991	L'ultima meta	Cliff Gaylor	
1991	Firestar: First Contact	Captain Bremner	
1993	Nexus	Tarn	
1995	Vendetta	Colonel de Piemonte	
1995	Savage Hearts	Country Gent	
1996	Past Into Present	Himself	
1997	Breeders	Police Lieutenant Moore	
1997	Diana & Me	Himself	
1998	The Brylcreem Boys	Hans Jorg Wolff	
1998	Candy	The Man	
1998	Mozart in Turkey	Bassa Selim	
1999	Grizzly Falls	Genet	
1999	Darkness Falls	The Money Dealer	
1999	Alec to the Rescue!	Professor James Richards	
2001	Journey of a Lifetime, Europe and the Middle East		Narrator
2003	Half-Empty	Lead	
2003	Don't Look Back!	Tom Johnson	
2004	Method	Teddy	
2005	An Airfield in England		Writer / Director
2015	Dad's Army	Wilhelm Canaris	
2015	The Honourable Rebel	Himself	
2016	Open My Eyes	Gunter Meinertzhagen	
2017	When the Devil Rides Out	"Doc" Antler	
2020	Conjuring: The Book of the Dead	Dr. Klien	

=== Television ===
Year	Title	Role	Notes
1972–1973	Arthur of the Britons	King Arthur	24 episodes
1974	Luke's Kingdom	Luke Firbeck	13 episodes
1975	Thriller	Alan Smerdon	Episode: "Won't Write Home Mom - I'm Dead"
1977	Jesus of Nazareth	Joel	TV Mini-Series
1980	Smuggler	Jack Vincent	13 episodes
1985	Robin of Sherwood	Bertrand de Nivelle	Episode: "Lord of the Trees"
1985	The Adventures of Sherlock Holmes	Captain Jack Crocker	Episode: "The Abbey Grange"
1986	Mountain Men: A Dangerous Kind of Love	Melchior Anderegg	TV movie
1986	Adventurer	Jack Vincent	12 episodes
1988	Boon	Jonathan Hillary	2 episodes
1989	Der Schattenspieler	Unknown	
1990	Cluedo	Count Henri de Beauchamp	Episode: "Countdown"
1990	The Paper Man	Ian Harris	3 episodes
1992–1993	Flash - Der Fotoreporter	"Flash"	6 episodes
1992	Glückliche Reise	Leibwächter Mathias	Episode: "Sri Lanka"
1993	Donauprinzessin	Rick Reimers	12 episodes
1993	Das Traumschiff	Stefan Reinking	Episode: "Hongkong"
1994	Broken Lullaby	Count Borodin	TV movie
1994	Eurocops	Crook	Episode: "Drei Mädchen"
1995	The Knock II	Alan Montfort	6 episodes
1997	Sharpe's Waterloo	Colonel Rebecque	TV movie
1997	Real Women	Callun	
2000	Klinik unter Palmen	Dr. Rudolfo Garcia	3 episodes
2001	Der Bestseller	Miguel Gonzales	TV movie
2002	Holby City	Jim Frost	Episode: "Every Cloud..."
2005	Unter weißen Segeln	Yussuf Arazi	Episode: "Abschiedsvorstellung"
2006	Mord in bester Gesellschaft	Comissario Santa Cruz	Episode: "Mord in bester Gesellschaft"
2006	Abschiedsmorgen	Father	
2008	Hunkeler macht Sachen	Thomas Garzoni	TV movie
