= Shakespeare in Love (play) =

2014 British play

- Original language: English
- Written by: Lee Hall
- Based on: Shakespeare in Love by Marc Norman; Tom Stoppard
- Characters: Lady Capulet; Wessex; Henslowe; Tilney; Sir Robert De Lesseps; Fennyman; Queen Elizabeth; Ned Alleyn; Marlowe; Nol; Wabash; Frees, Musician; Will Shakespeare; Molly; Mistress Quickly; Sam; Ralph; Burbage; Viola De Lesseps; Kate; Webster
- Genre: Play
- Setting: London, 1593

Premiere
- Date: 22 July 2014
- Place: Noël Coward Theatre, London
- Official website

The cast of Shakespeare in Love in Korea

Shakespeare in Love is a play by Lee Hall adapted from the 1998 film of the same title by Marc Norman and Tom Stoppard.

== Production history ==
The play premiered at the Noël Coward Theatre in London's West End on 22 July 2014. It was produced by Disney Theatrical Productions and Sonia Friedman Productions and directed by Declan Donnellan, with design by Nick Ormerod and music by Paddy Cunneen. The original cast included David Oakes appearing as Marlowe, Tom Bateman as Will, and Lucy Briggs-Owen as the heroine Viola De Lesseps. The production closed on 18 April 2015.

The production played to sold-out audiences during the 2016 Stratford (Ontario, Canada) Festival season. The director of the production was Declan Donnellan, with the rest of the original creative team from London show returning for the Canadian production.

The first U.S. production of the play occurred on 18 February 2017, at the Oregon Shakespeare Festival. The play was produced at the Burbage Theater of Pawtucket, Rhode Island, as the first presentation of its 2018–2019 season.

In 2017, the first South African production of the play took place at The Fugard Theatre (Cape Town, South Africa). It was directed by Greg Karvellas, produced by Eric Abraham and starred Dylan Edy as William Shakespeare alongside Roxane Hayward as Viola De Lesseps. It played to sold-out audiences and, due to its success, was brought back in 2018 with Hayward reprising her role, opposite Daniel Mpilo Richard stepping in as Shakespeare.

In 2018, the Japanese version of the play was produced by Shiki Theatre Company. The script was translated by Matsuoka Kazuko, and the production was directed by Aoki Go. It was staged in Tokyo, Kyoto, and Fukuoka.

In 2023, a Korean version of the play was produced by Shownotw. The production was directed by Kim Dong-yeon and translated by Lee In-Soo. It was staged at CJ Towol Theater in Seoul. Shakespeare In Love became the first South Korean play of which ticket price exceeded 100,000 won. The production company said that the price hike was inevitable, stating "The play is having its first run in Korea, so we had to create everything from scratch ― the set, lighting, costume and others. We had to bring most of the set props from outside of Korea because the play is set in the 16th-century Renaissance period, characterized by its extravagance and glamor. Due to inflation, labor costs have also gone up."

== Cast ==
Original London Company

- Lucy Briggs-Owen as Viola de Lesseps
- Tom Bateman as William Shakespeare
- David Oakes as Christopher 'Kit' Marlowe
- Paul Chahidi as Philip Henslowe
- Alistair Petrie as Lord Wessex
- Doug Rao as Ned Alleyn
- Anna Carteret as Elizabeth I of England
- Ian Bartholomew as Edmund Tilney
- David Ganly as Richard Burbage
- Abigail McKern as Nurse
- Ferdy Roberts as Hugh Fennyman
- Patrick Osborne as Wabash
- Harry Jardine as Sam
- Colin Ryan as John Webster
- Richard Howard as Sir Robert De Lesseps
- Charlie Tighe as Nol / Musician
- Tony Bell as Ralph
- Thomas Padden as Boatman / Musician
- Elliott Rennie as Catlin / Musician
- Timothy O'Hara as Ensemble
- Daisy Boulton as Ensemble
- Janet Fullerlove as Ensemble
- Michael Chadwick as Ensemble
- Sandy Murray as Ensemble / Dance Captain
- Tim van Eyken as Ensemble / Musical Director

Cast from 12 January 2015

- Eve Ponsonby as Viola de Lesseps
- Orlando James as William Shakespeare
- Edward Franklin as Christopher 'Kit' Marlowe
- Neal Barry as Philip Henslowe
- Nicholas Asbury as Lord Wessex
- Ryan Donaldson as Ned Alleyn
- Suzanne Burden as Elizabeth I of England
- Richard Bremmer as Edmund Tilney and Sir Robert de Lesseps
- Peter Moreton as Richard Burbage
- Joy Richardson as Nurse
- Paul Brennan as Hugh Fennyman
- Ncuti Gatwa as Wabash
- Gregg Lowe as Sam
- Stuart Wilde as John Webster
- Charlie Tighe as Nol / Musician
- Thomas Padden as Boatman / Musician / Musical Director
- Elliott Rennie as Catlin / Musician
- Andy McKeane as Ralph
- Aaron Anthony as Ensemble
- Jonno Davies as Ensemble
- Florence Roberts as Ensemble
- Sioned Jones as Ensemble
- Ellie Nunn as Ensemble
- Sandy Murray as Ensemble / Dance Captain
- Nick Hart Ensemble / Musician
