= Boris Godunov (play) =

1825 play by Alexander Pushkin

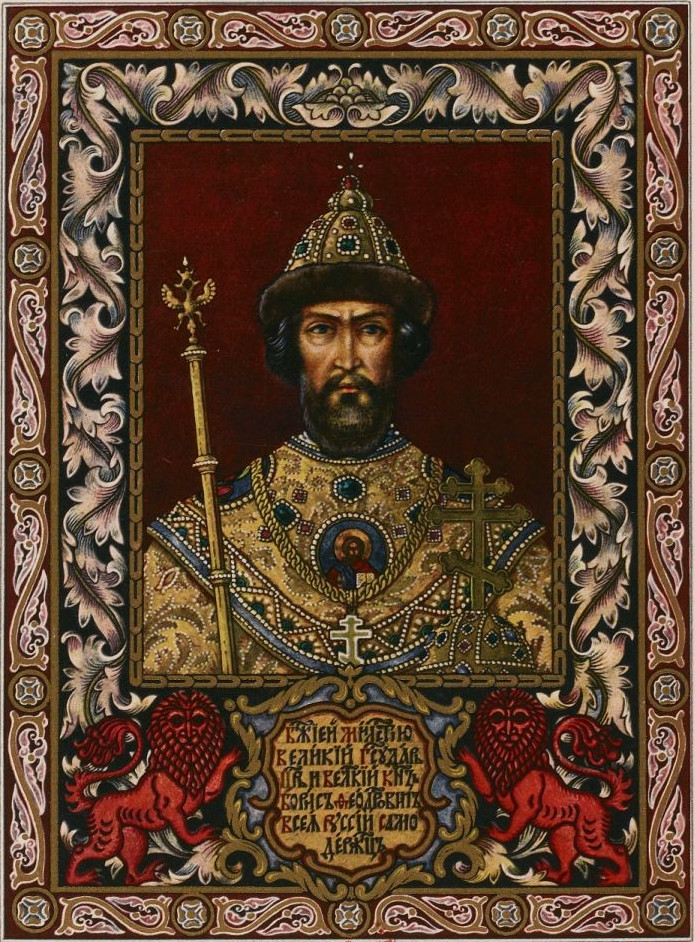
- Illustration from the 1925 French publication of the play
- Original language: Russian
- Written by: Alexander Pushkin
- Genre: Tragedy
- Setting: Russia and Poland–Lithuania, 1598–1605

Premiere
- Date: September 17, 1870
- Place: Saint Petersburg

Boris Godunov (Russian: Борис Годунов; variant title: Драматическая повесть, Комедия o настоящей беде Московскому государству, o царе Борисе и о Гришке Отрепьеве, A Dramatic Tale, The Comedy of the Distress of the Muscovite State, of Tsar Boris, and of Grishka Otrepyev) is a play by Alexander Pushkin. It was written in 1825, published in 1831, but not approved for performance by the censor until 1866. It premiered in 1870. Its subject is the Russian ruler Boris Godunov, who reigned as Tsar from 1598 to 1605. It consists of 25 scenes and is written predominantly in blank verse.

Modest Mussorgsky's opera, Boris Godunov (1874), is based on this play.

== Characters ==
- Boris Godunov, boyar, later Tsar
- Feodor, his son
- Xenia, his daughter
- Xenia's Nurse
- Prince Shuisky, boyar
- Prince Vorotinsky, boyar
- Shchelkalov, Secretary of the Duma
- Pimen, monk and chronicler
- Grigoriy Otrepyev, monk, later Dmitriy, the Pretender
- Patriarch, Abbot of the Chudov Monastery.
- Misail, wandering monk
- Varlaam, wandering monk
- Afanasy Mikhailovich Pushkin, friend of Prince Shuisky
- Gabriel Pushkin, his nephew
- Semyon Nikitich Godunov, secret agent of Boris Godunov
- Prince Kurbsky, disgraced boyar
- Khrushchov, disgraced boyar
- Karela, a Cossack
- Prince Vyshnevetsky
- Mnishek, Voyevoda of Sambor
- Marina, his daughter
- Ruzya, her chambermaid
- Basmanov, a Russian officer
- Marzharet, officer of Boris
- Rozen, officer of Boris
- Mosalsky, boyar
- Hostess of the Inn
- Boyars, People, Peasants, Inspectors, Officers, Attendants, Guests, a Catholic Priest, a Polish Noble, a Poet, an Idiot, a Beggar, Gentlemen, Guards, Soldiers, Ladies, Gentleman, Boys, Servants

== Plot ==
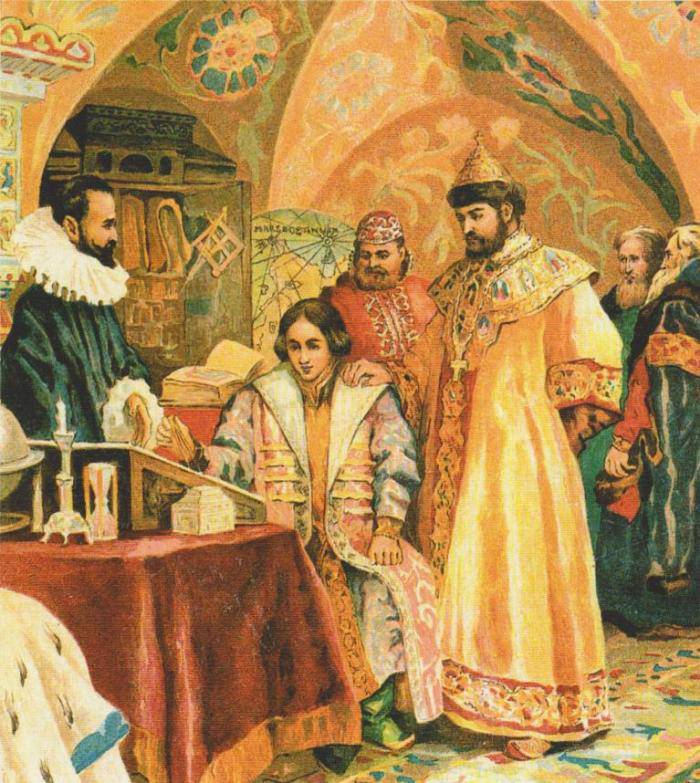
Boris Godunov and his son depicted in a painting by N. Nekrasov, featuring a scene from the play

In 1598, Tsar Feodor Ivanovich has just died. The people beg Boris Godunov, the late tsar's brother-in-law who has locked himself in a monastery, to accept the crown. After some hesitation, he accepts. In 1603, Grishka Otrepyev, a monk at Chudov Monastery, learns from his elder Pimen the details of the murder of Tsarevich Dmitry of Uglich (Tsar Feodor's younger brother) by Godunov. Grishka escapes from the monastery, planning to pass himself off as the murdered tsarevich. The Kremlin learns about him and declares a search. Otrepyev crosses the Lithuanian border, narrowly escaping capture in a tavern.

The boyars Shuisky and Afanasy Pushkin read a letter about the appearance of the miraculously saved tsarevich, after which Shuisky goes to tell the news to Tsar Boris. Godunov, horrified by the news, is tormented by his conscience and orders Shuisky to find out whether the tsarevich really died. In the Polish city of Kraków, in the house of Prince Vyshnevetsky, False Dmitry (Otrepyev) begins to gather his retinue. Then, in the castle of the governor Mnishek in Sambor, he courts the governor's daughter Marina and even admits to her that he is just a runaway monk. For Marina, the only thing that matters is whether False Dmitry will elevate her to the throne of Moscow.

In 1604, False Dmitry's army crosses the border. At the council in the Kremlin, the patriarch advises the tsar to transfer the relics of Tsarevich Dmitry from Uglich to Moscow: it was discovered that Dmitry was a saint and a miracle worker, and the display of relics for public veneration will help expose False Dmitry as an impostor. However, Shuisky, seeing Boris's confusion, rejects this proposal. In December, a battle takes place near Novgorod-Seversky, where Godunov's troops are defeated. On Cathedral Square, a holy fool accuses Boris of murder. In Sevsk, False Dmitry interrogates a captured nobleman, and soon after his army is defeated.

In Moscow, Tsar Boris suddenly dies, having managed to appoint his son Feodor as his successor. Gavrila Pushkin pushes Basmanov, one of Godunov's main commanders who is favored by the tsar but has no family, to commit treason. Then, on Lobnoye Mesto, Gavrila Pushkin proclaims the rule of False Dmitry and provokes a rebellion against Godunov's children. The boyars enter the house where Tsar Feodor, his sister, and their mother are imprisoned and strangle them. Boyar Mosalsky announces to the people (the last words of the play): "People! Maria Godunova and her son Feodor have poisoned themselves. We saw their dead bodies. Why are you silent? Shout: Long live Tsar Dmitry Ivanovich!" The people are silent. (Note: In the published version of the play, the stage direction "the people are silent" replaces the reply of the people "Long live Tsar Dmitry Ivanovich!" which appears in the earlier, manuscript version of the play. The reason for this change, whether the result of Pushkin's concerns about censorship or a deliberate artistic choice, has been extensively debated.)

== Texts and composition ==
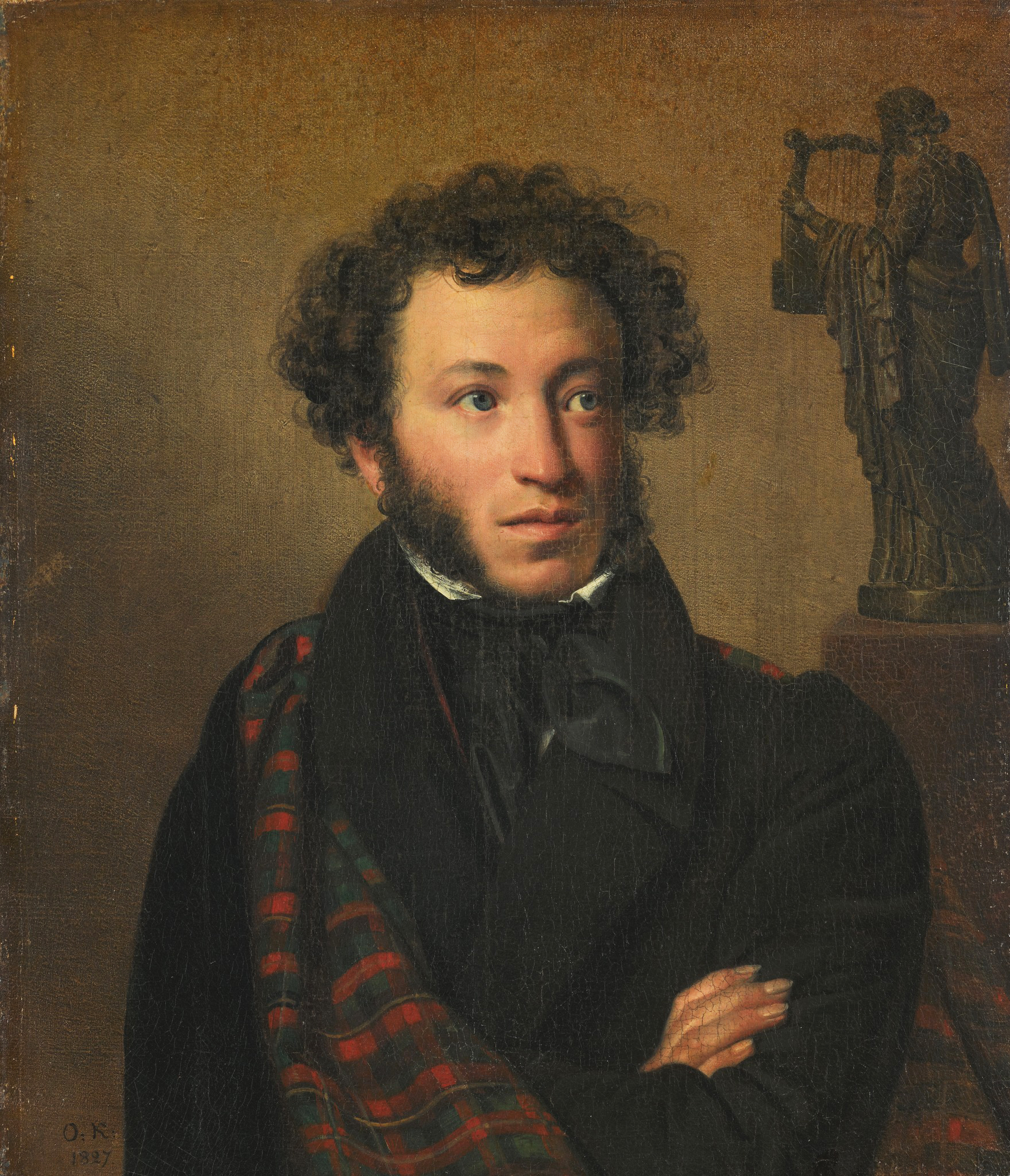
Alexander Pushkin by Orest Kiprensky

Pushkin wrote the play during his two-year exile at his family's estate of Mikhaylovskoye in the Pskov Governorate. He began working on it in November or December 1824 and completed it in November 1825. Having finished the play, Pushkin famously wrote to his friend Pyotr Vyazemsky: "My tragedy is done; I read it out loud, alone, clapping my hands and shouting: 'at a boy, Pushkin, 'at a boy, you son of a bitch!" Upon his return to Saint Petersburg in 1826, Pushkin read the play to his friends, who received it enthusiastically.

Pushkin himself indicated the sources he used while writing Boris Godunov: the works of Shakespeare, Nikolai Karamzin's History of the Russian State, and old Russian chronicles. He engaged in serious historical research for the first time while writing the play. He wrote of the work:

The study of Shakespeare, Karamzin, and our old chronicles gave me the idea of clothing in dramatic forms one of the most dramatic epochs of our history. Not disturbed by any other influence, I imitated Shakespeare in his broad and free depictions of characters, in the simple and careless combination of plots; I followed Karamzin in the clear development of events; I tried to guess the way of thinking and the language of the time from the chronicles. Rich sources! Whether I was able to make the best use of them, I don't know – but at least my labors were zealous and conscientious.

Pushkin believed that a reader of his play should first "leaf through the last volume of [the History of] Karamzin", since "it is full of good jokes and subtle allusions on the history of that time… It is necessary to understand them, this is a sine qua non." According to Pushkin scholar Grigory Vinokur, not only the historical narrative but also the literary style of Karamzin's History influenced Pushkin's work. Another possible influence was Kondraty Ryleyev's poem Boris Godunov (one of his series of poems called Dumy 'Meditations'), where Godunov is likewise depicted as an intelligent ruler with a tortured conscience; however, Pushkin had a low opinion of Ryleyev's Dumy.

Two main versions of the play exist. The earliest version is that which Pushkin finished writing in 1825, with the title Komediya o tsare Borise i o Grishke Otrepyeve (Comedy about Tsar Boris and Grishka Otrepyev). This version was rejected by state censorship in 1826. It was subsequently revised by Pushkin and published in 1830 (listed as 1831 in the book) (Note: Printed copies of the play were actually first distributed on December 24, 1830, but they bore the date 1831.) under the title Boris Godunov. Tsar Nicholas I took a personal interest in Pushkin's play before its publication. After receiving a negative report on the play from the imperial secret police, the Tsar suggested that Pushkin transform the work into a novel in the style of Walter Scott "with the necessary rectifications"; Pushkin declined. Most later publications of the play used the 1831 version with the addition of one scene (Scene 3) from the 1825 version, which was considered to have been removed because of censorship. (Other excluded sections have been published as appendices in various editions.) More recent scholarly publications of Pushkin's works (Note: Such as the seventh volume of the projected twenty-volume complete works of Pushkin, published by Nauka in 2009.) have presented the two versions of the play separately.

The following changes were made to the 1825 version for the 1831 publication: three scenes were cut out, two others were shortened, one scene was transposed, changes were made to the tavern scene, the title was changed, a dedication to the memory of Karamzin was added, and the final line was changed (instead of the people shouting "Long live Tsar Dmitry Ivanovich!" upon being prompted by the boyars, there is the stage direction "the people are silent [narod bezmolvstvuyet]"). Pushkin scholar Sergei Fomichev states that it is very difficult to determine which of the differences between the 1825 and 1831 versions are the result of Pushkin's creative decisions and which are the result of censorship. According to the editors of the 2009 edition published by Nauka, only two changes (which are changes in wording) can be attributed with certainty to censorship.

== Performance ==
The play was never performed during Pushkin's lifetime. Performance of the play was officially forbidden in Russia by state censorship until 1866. The play's departures from existing conventions made many contemporaries view it as unsuitable for the stage. The play also called for many changes of scenery, which, though not impossible to achieve by the means of the time, made it technically more difficult to stage. According to literary scholar Igor Pilshchikov, "Theater critics still argue about the stage quality of Godunov. But whatever the theories, practice ruthlessly shows: the fate of Pushkin's tragedy on the stage can hardly be called successful."

=== Saint Petersburg premiere ===
The first performance took place on 17 September 1870 at the Mariinsky Theatre in Saint Petersburg, given by the artists of the Aleksandrinsky Theatre. Production personnel included Aleksandr Yablochkin (regisseur), and Matvey Shishkov (scene designer). The cast included Leonid Leonidov (Boris) [?], Vasiliy Samoylov (the False Dmitriy), Pyotr Grigoryev (Pimen), Yelena Struyskaya (Marina), and Pyotr Zubrov (Shuisky).

=== Moscow premiere ===
The Moscow premiere took place on 19 November 1880 at the Maliy Theatre. Production personnel included Sergey Chernevsky (regisseur). The cast included Nikolay Vilde (Boris), Aleksandr Lensky (the False Dmitriy), Ivan Samarin (Pimen), Maria Yermolova (Marina), Osip Pravdin (Shuisky), and Mikhail Lentovsky (Basmanov).

=== Later productions ===
Vsevolod Meyerhold attempted a staging of the play in the 1930s. Meyerhold commissioned Sergei Prokofiev to write incidental music for his production, but when Meyerhold abandoned it under political pressure, the score was abandoned as well.

The original, uncensored play did not receive a première until April 12, 2007, at Princeton University in the United States, and then only in an English translation. This production was based on Meyerhold's design and featured Prokofiev's music, together with supplemental music by Peter Westergaard.

The Royal Shakespeare Company staged the British premiere of the original 1825 edition at Stratford on Avon in the autumn of 2012. The play had been translated into English by Adrian Mitchell.

== Stage designs ==
The following gallery depicts the scene designs created by Matvey Shishkov for the first performance of the drama in 1870 at the Mariinsky Theatre, Saint Petersburg, Russia.

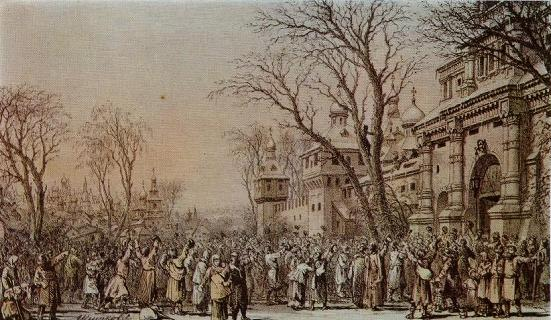
Scene 3
The Novodevichiy Monastery

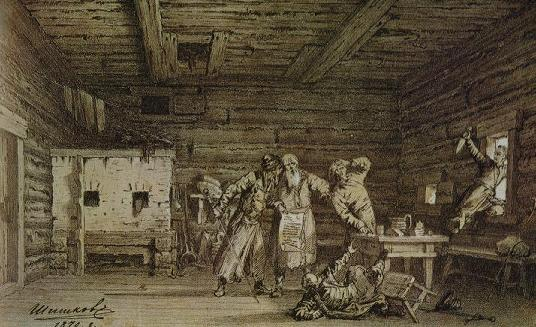
Scene 9
An Inn on the
Lithuanian Border

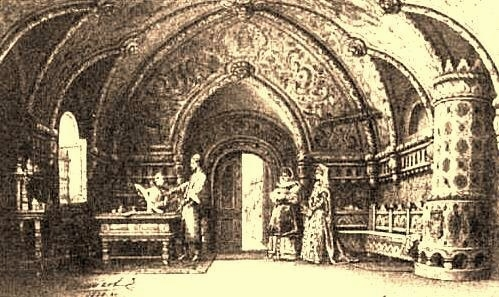
Scene 11
The Tsar's Palace

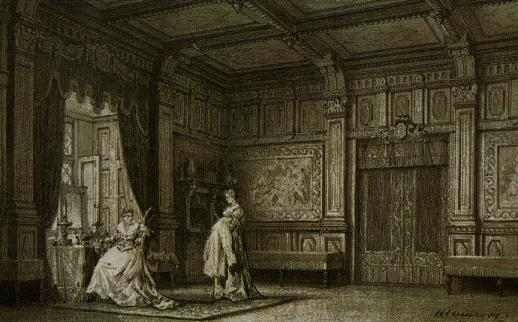
Scene 13
The Castle of the Governor Mniszech in Sambor

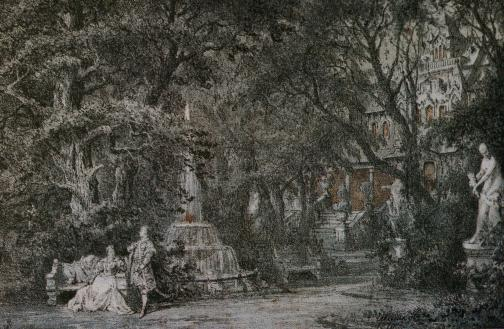
Scene 15
Night. A Garden.
A Fountain.

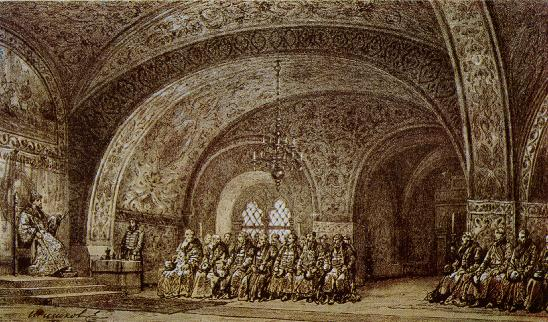
Scene 17
The Tsar's Duma

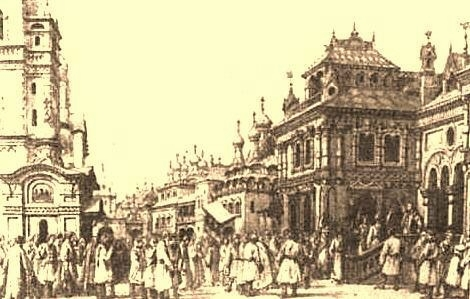
Scene 25
The House of Boris

== Adaptations ==
In 1830, writer and journalist Faddei Bulgarin published the historical novel Dmitry Samozvanets (Dmitry the Pretender). Pushkin, who had already written Boris Godunov at this point and published only three excerpts in journals, accused Bulgarin of plagiarizing the play. Certain scenes and dialogues which appear in the play but not in the historical sources are replicated in Bulgarin's novel. It is assumed that Bulgarin requested to examine the manuscript from the tsarist secret police, which had ordered Pushkin to submit the manuscript for inspection. Bulgarin wrote a letter to Pushkin defending himself, but Pushkin was not convinced. In March 1830, Bulgarin read a harsh review of his novel in the journal Literaturnaya Gazeta, which he wrongly assumed to be the work of Pushkin. In response, Bulgarin wrote his own scathing review of Chapter 7 of Pushkin's Eugene Onegin. Hostility between Pushkin and Bulgarin persisted after this.

Inspired by Pushkin's play, Modest Mussorgsky composed the opera Boris Godunov, which premiered in 1874 and became one of the classics of world opera in the twentieth century. A film adaptation, directed by and starring Sergei Bondarchuk, was released in 1986. In 2011, another film adaptation, directed by Vladimir Mirzoyev and starring Maksim Sukhanov in the lead role, was released. In this version, the action takes place in modern-day Russia.
