= Miss Sara Sampson =

Play by Gotthold Ephraim Lessing

- Original language: German
- Written by: Gotthold Ephraim Lessing
- Characters: Sir William Sampson; Miss Sara, his daughter Mellefont; Marwood, Mellefont's old lover Arabella, Marwood's daughter Waitwell, an old servant of Sampson; Norton, servant of Mellefont; Betty, maid of Sara; Hannah, maid of Marwood; The Innkeeper and some secondary characters.
- Genre: Tragedy; Bourgeois tragedy
- Setting: England

Premiere
- Date: 10 July 1755
- Place: Drill hall in Frankfurt-on-the-Oder, Germany

Miss Sara Sampson (original spelling Miß Sara Sampson) is a play by the Enlightenment philosopher, Gotthold Ephraim Lessing. Written in 1755 while the author was living in Potsdam and set in an English inn, it is seen by many scholars to be one of the first bourgeois tragedies. In the same year it was put on at Frankfurt-on-the-Oder, where it was very well received. It was afterwards translated and acted in France, where it also met with success. The play was Lessing's first real success as a playwright and it was in part due to the success of this play that he was asked to be the dramaturg at the German National Theatre in Hamburg.

== Plot ==
=== Act 1 - Exposition ===
Miss Sara's father Sir William Sampson is the first character to appear, accompanied by his servant Waitwell. He comes to bring the virtuous Sara back to his home and reconcile with her, having previously rejected his daughter's lover Mellefont. He wants her back out of love but also selfishness, as he does not want to be alone in his old age. She and Mellefont had fled to France, intending to marry there - she is keen on that course but he has second thoughts and delays their departure on the pretext of waiting for an inheritance from a cousin. That inheritance is conditional on his marrying a relative - they hate each other and have agreed to share the inheritance. Sara still loves her father and suffers from being separated from him, regretting having wanted to leave him alone. Mellefont's former mistress Marwood writes him a letter informing him that she is staying at another inn nearby and he goes to visit her.

=== Act 2 - Marwood ===
Marwood and Sir William are both pursuing the fugitive couple. She wants to win Mellefont back, but out of wounded pride rather than love. She initially tries to win him over with intimacy but later tries to soften him by bringing their daughter Arabella into the room. Mellefont seems won over and goes back to disown Sara, but soon returns to Marwood after regaining his composure. He has decided not to break up with Sara and wishes to take Arabella with him, but Marwood reveals her true colours and makes a failed attempt to stab him with a dagger. She regrets this action and (as a ruse) asks Mellefont for permission to meet Sara under a fake identity - Mellefont agrees to this.

=== Act 3 - Sir William's letter to Sara, Sara meets Marwood ===
Marwood has also revealed Sara and Mellefont's location to Sir William, who writes his daughter a letter, forgiving them both and urging them to return to him. Sara hesitates on first receiving the letter but - after lengthy discussions with Sir William's servant Waitwell - reads it. She begins to write a reply, but is interrupted by Marwood's arrival. Sara does not realize that it is Marwood, but assumes that the woman is Lady Solmes (a relative from the Mellefont family). Everything seems to suggest that a positive resolution to the situation between Sir Sampson and his daughter is possible and that the work will be a 'comédie larmoyante', but Marwood's schemes are set to prevent that.

=== Act 4 - Mellefont's hesitation and the rivals' encounter ===
The first three scenes of this act reveal to the audience that Mellefont is actually more hesitant about the wedding than previously assumed. Its fourth scene marks the beginning of the end: Marwood encounters her rival Sara again, as Sara wishes to say goodbye. Mellefont is not pleased with this meeting. During a highly dramatic conversation in which Sara lays out her moral code, Marwood inadvertently reveals herself and is forced to disclose her true identity. Shocked, Sara flees and briefly faints.

=== Act 5 - Tragic ending ===
At first, everything seems to resolve itself happily. Sara has doubts when Marwood tells her about Arabella. However, after confronting Mellefont, she forgives him and even offers to raise Arabella as her own child. However, over the course of the opening scenes of the fifth act, Sara's health deteriorates. This is initially explained as a side-effect of her fainting, but it soon becomes clear that Marwood has poisoned Sara.

Mellefont rushes to her aid in a fit of rage. Sir William, who has witnessed this, recognizes Mellefont's true love in his reaction. Sir William pardons the two lovers while Sara is on her deathbed, while Sara forgives Marwood and as her dying wish begs her father to take care of Mellefont and his daughter. Her father is tormented by guilt and so immediately agrees to this and forgives.

Considering the nobility of Sara and her father, Mellefont is unable to bring himself to take revenge on Marwood but stabs himself, unable to find the strength to forgive himself. Sir William sticks to his promise to Sara and takes in Arabella.

== See also ==
- Gotthold Ephraim Lessing
- Bourgeois tragedy
- Age of Enlightenment
