= 1703 =

1703 in various calendars
- Gregorian calendar: 1703; MDCCIII
- Ab urbe condita: 2456
- Armenian calendar: 1152; ԹՎ ՌՃԾԲ
- Assyrian calendar: 6453
- Balinese saka calendar: 1624–1625
- Bengali calendar: 1109–1110
- Berber calendar: 2653
- English Regnal year: 1 Ann. 1 – 2 Ann. 1
- Buddhist calendar: 2247
- Burmese calendar: 1065
- Byzantine calendar: 7211–7212
- Chinese calendar: 壬午年 (Water Horse); 4400 or 4193 — to — 癸未年 (Water Goat); 4401 or 4194
- Coptic calendar: 1419–1420
- Discordian calendar: 2869
- Ethiopian calendar: 1695–1696
- Hebrew calendar: 5463–5464
- Hindu calendars
- Vikram Samvat: 1759–1760
- Shaka Samvat: 1624–1625
- Kali Yuga: 4803–4804
- Holocene calendar: 11703
- Igbo calendar: 703–704
- Iranian calendar: 1081–1082
- Islamic calendar: 1114–1115
- Japanese calendar: Genroku 16 (元禄１６年)
- Javanese calendar: 1626–1627
- Julian calendar: Gregorian minus 11 days
- Korean calendar: 4036
- Minguo calendar: 209 before ROC 民前209年
- Nanakshahi calendar: 235
- Thai solar calendar: 2245–2246
- Tibetan calendar: ཆུ་ཕོ་རྟ་ལོ་ (male Water-Horse); 1829 or 1448 or 676 — to — ཆུ་མོ་ལུག་ལོ་ (female Water-Sheep); 1830 or 1449 or 677

1703 (MDCCIII) was a common year starting on Monday of the Gregorian calendar and a common year starting on Friday of the Julian calendar, the 1703rd year of the Common Era (CE) and Anno Domini (AD) designations, the 703rd year of the 2nd millennium, the 3rd year of the 18th century, and the 4th year of the 1700s decade. As of the start of 1703, the Gregorian calendar was 11 days ahead of the Julian calendar, which remained in localized use until 1923.

In the Swedish calendar it was a common year starting on Thursday, one day ahead of the Julian and ten days behind the Gregorian calendar.

== Events ==
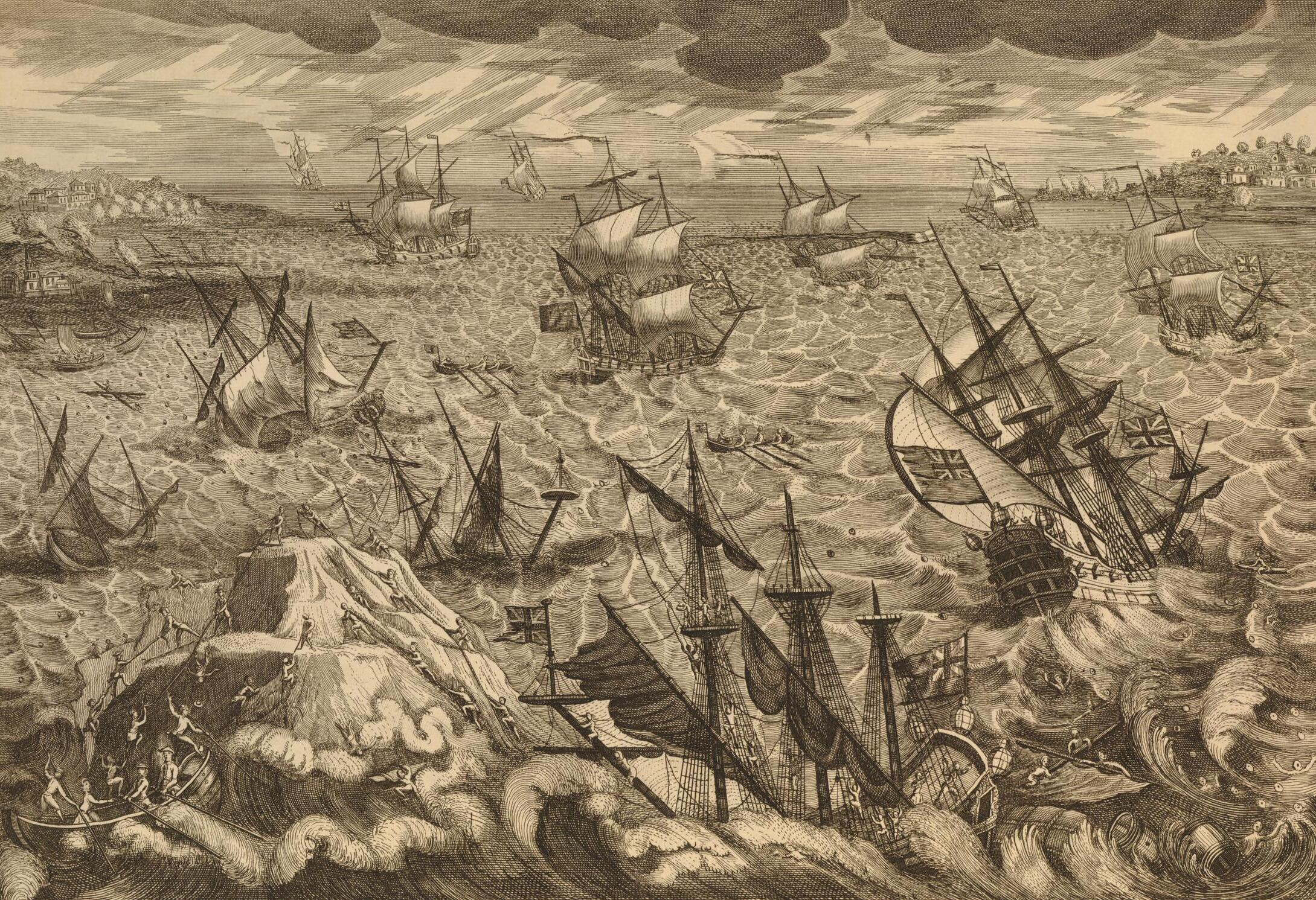
December 7: The Great Storm of 1703 strikes Britain (November 26 by the calendar in use locally)

=== January–March ===
- January 9 – The Jamaican town of Port Royal, a center of trade in the Western Hemisphere and at this time the largest city in the Caribbean, is destroyed by a fire. British ships in the harbor are able to rescue much of the merchandise that has been unloaded on the docks, but the inventory in market-places in town is destroyed.
- January 14 – 1703 Apennine earthquakes: The magnitude 6.7 Norcia earthquake affects Central Italy with a maximum Mercalli intensity of XI (Extreme). With a death toll of 6,240–9,761, it is the first in a sequence of three destructive events.
- January 16 – 1703 Apennine earthquakes: The magnitude 6.2 Montereale earthquake causes damage at Accumoli, Armatrice, Cittareale and Montereale, with a maximum Mercalli intensity of VIII (Severe).
- January 30 (December 14 of previous year in the Chinese calendar) – Akō incident: In Japan, forty-seven rōnin (independent samurai) assassinate daimyō Kira Yoshinaka, the enemy of their former lord Asano Naganori, at his own mansion as a vengeance; for which they are compelled to commit suicide on March 20.
- February 2 – 1703 Apennine earthquakes: The magnitude 6.7 L'Aquila earthquake affects Central Italy, with a maximum Mercalli intensity of X (Extreme). In the final large event (an example of Coulomb stress transfer), damage occurs as far distant as Rome, with landslides, liquefaction, slope failures and at least 2,500 deaths.
- February 20–March 10 – War of the Spanish Succession: Siege of Kehl – French forces under the command of the Duc de Villars capture the fortress of the Holy Roman Empire at Kehl, opposite Strasbourg on the Rhine.
- February – Soldiers at Fort Louis de la Mobile celebrate Mardi Gras in Mobile, starting the tradition for Mobile, Alabama.
- March 1 – The Recruiting Act 1703 goes into effect in England, providing for the forcible enlistment of able-bodied but unemployed men into the English Army and Royal Navy in order to fight in Queen Anne's War in North America. The Act expires at the end of February 1704.
- March 15 – The landmark English court case of Rose v Royal College of Physicians is decided by the Court of Queen's Bench, beginning the end of the monopoly that the Royal College of Physicians has over the practice of medicine.
- March 19 – The Siege of Guadeloupe begins as an English expeditionary force, led by Christopher Codrington and Hovenden Walker, lands at Basse-Terre and attempts to take over the French-held island. The English fleet departs on May 15 after being unable to capture Guadeloupe.
- March 20 (February 4 in the Chinese calendar) – 46 of the forty-seven rōnin of Japan carry out an order of seppuku (ritual suicide) for the killing they committed on January 30. The punishment is given by the shogun Tokugawa Tsunayoshi. The story continues to be dramatized more than 300 years later in Chūshingura theater, novels and film.
- March 21 – Jeanne Guyon is freed from the Bastille in Paris after more than seven years imprisonment for heresy.

=== April–June ===
- April 21 – The Company of Quenching of Fire (i.e., a fire brigade) is founded in Edinburgh, Scotland.
- May 26 – Portugal joins the Grand Alliance.
- May 27 (May 16 OS) – The city of Saint Petersburg, Russia is founded, following Peter the Great's reconquest of Ingria from Sweden during the Great Northern War.
- June 15 – Rákóczi's War of Independence: Hungarians rebel under Prince Francis II Rákóczi.
- June 19 – Bavarian troops, who during the so-called Bavarian Rummel have invaded Tyrol, besiege Kufstein. Fires break out on the outskirts that engulf the town, destroy it and reach the powder store of the supposedly impregnable fortress. The enormous gunpowder supplies explode and Kufstein has to surrender on June 20. This same day the Tyrolese surrender in Wörgl; two days later Rattenberg is captured and Innsbruck is cleared without a fight on June 25.
- June 30 – Battle of Ekeren (War of the Spanish Succession): The French surround a smaller Dutch force, which however breaks out and retires to safety.
- June – The completed 1703 Icelandic census is presented in the Althing, the first complete census of any country.

=== July–September ===
- July 26 – After their victories at the Pontlatzer Bridge and the Brenner Pass, Tyrolese farmers drive out the Bavarian Elector, Maximilian II Emanuel, from North Tyrol and thus prevent the Bavarian Army, which is allied with France, from marching on Vienna during the War of the Spanish Succession. This success, at low cost, is the signal for the rebellion of the Tyrolese against Bavaria, and Elector Maximilian II Emanuel has to flee from Innsbruck. The Bavarian Army withdraws through Seefeld in Tirol back to Bavaria.
- July 29–31 – Daniel Defoe is placed in a pillory in London, then imprisoned until mid-November for the crime of seditious libel after publishing his satirical political pamphlet The Shortest Way with the Dissenters (1702).
- August 23 – Edirne event: Sultan Mustafa II of the Ottoman Empire is dethroned.
- September 7 – War of the Spanish Succession: The town of Breisach is retaken for France by Camille d'Hostun, duc de Tallard.
- September 12 – War of the Spanish Succession: Habsburg Archduke Charles is proclaimed King of Spain, but never exercises full rule.

=== October–December ===
- October 11 – Nine Roman Catholic residents of the French village of Sainte-Cécile-d'Andorge are massacred by a mob of more than 800 French Huguenot Protestants, the Camisards. A reprisal against Protestants in the nearby village of Branoux is made less than three weeks later.
- October 23 – Hannah Twynnoy, a 24-year-old barmaid in Malmesbury, Wiltshire, becomes the first person to be killed in Great Britain by a tiger. While working at the White Lion Inn, where a group of wild animals is on exhibit, she is mauled after bothering the tiger.
- October 30 – More than 47 Huguenots in the village of Branoux-les-Taillades are massacred by Roman Catholic vigilantes in reprisal for the October 11 attack on nearby Sainte-Cécile, slightly more than two miles away.
- November 15
  - War of the Spanish Succession: Battle of Speyerbach (in modern-day Germany) – The French defeat a German relief army, allowing the French to take the besieged town of Landau two days later, for which Tallard is made a Marshal of France.
  - Rákóczi's War of Independence: Battle of Zvolen (in modern-day Slovakia) – The Kurucs defeat the Austrians and their allies (Denmark, Hungary and the Serbs).
- November 19 – The so-called Man in the Iron Mask dies in the Bastille. He is buried under the name of "Marchioly".
- November 30 – Isaac Newton is elected president of the Royal Society of London, a position he will hold until his death in 1727.
- December 7–10 (November 26–29 O.S.) – The Great Storm of 1703, an extratropical cyclone, ravages southern England and the English Channel, killing at least 8,000, mostly at sea. The Eddystone Lighthouse off Plymouth is destroyed in the storm together with its designer Henry Winstanley and many buildings on land are damaged.
- December 27 – Portugal and England sign the Methuen Treaty, which gives preference to Portuguese wines imported into England.
- December 28 – Ahmed III succeeds the deposed Mustafa II as Ottoman Emperor.

=== Date unknown ===
- French-born imposter George Psalmanazar arrives in London.
- Between 1702 and 1703 – An epidemic of smallpox breaks out in Quebec, in which 2,000-3,000 people die (300-400 in Quebec City).

== Births ==
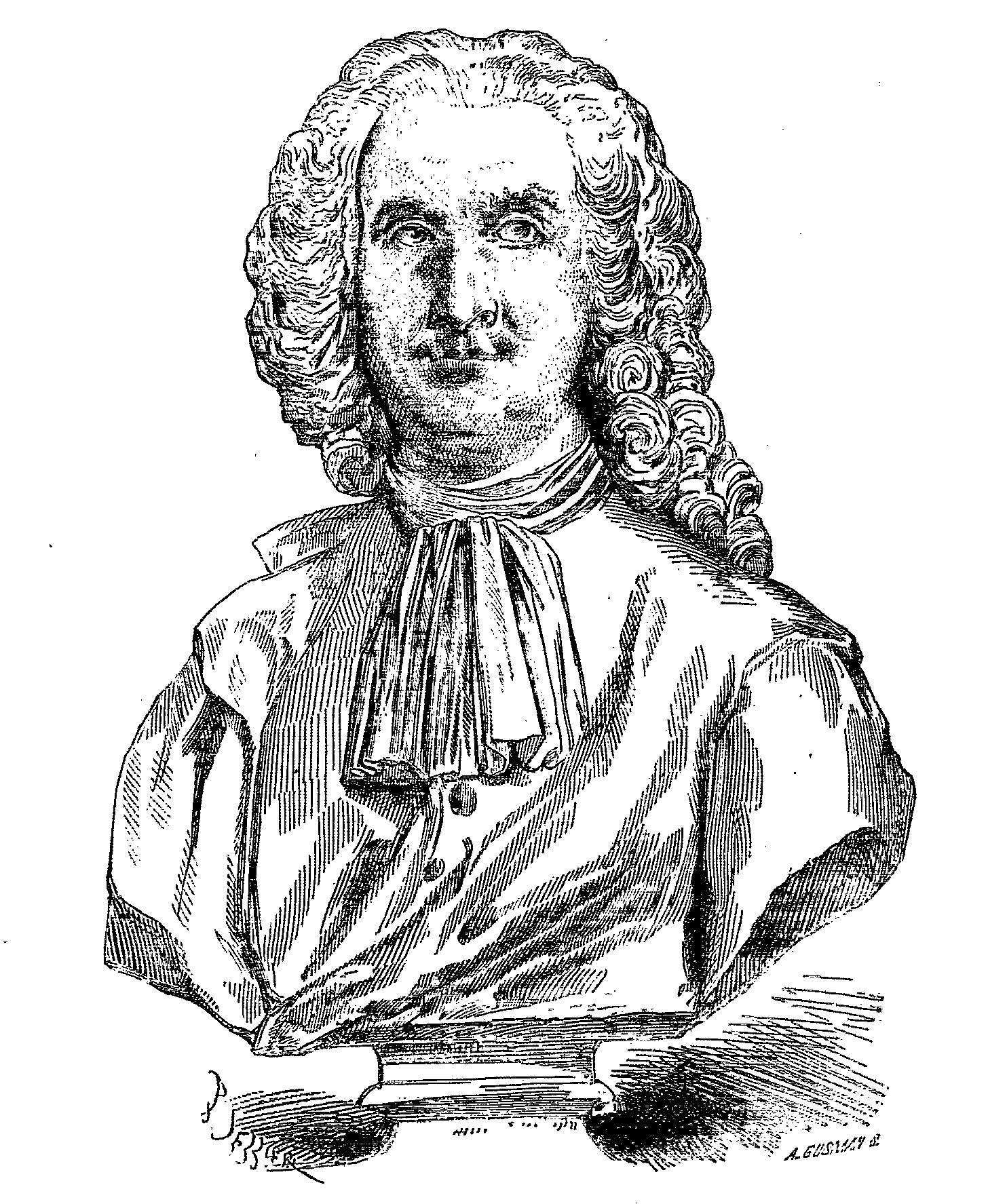
Daniel-Charles Trudaine born 3 January

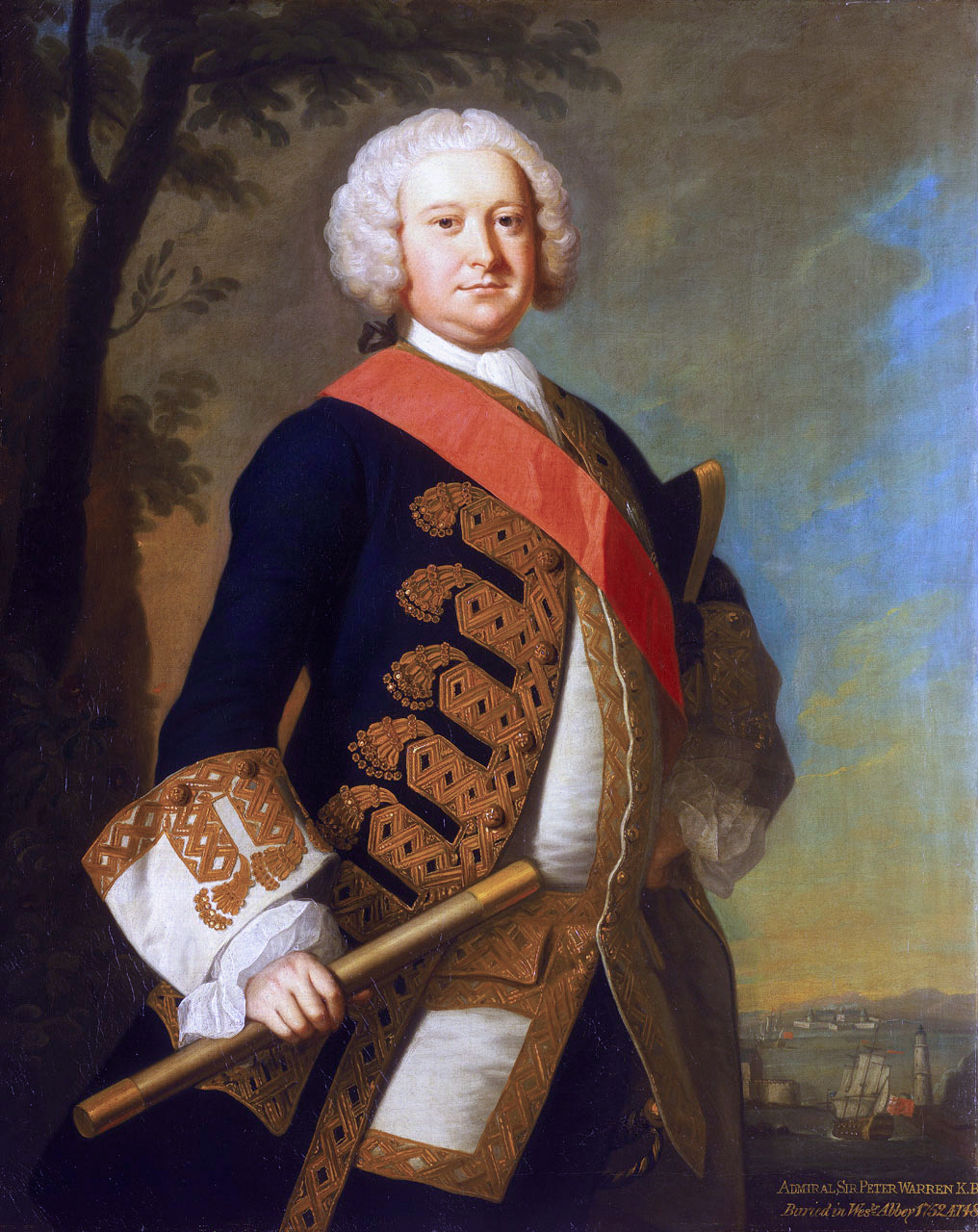
Peter Warren (Royal Navy officer) born 10 March

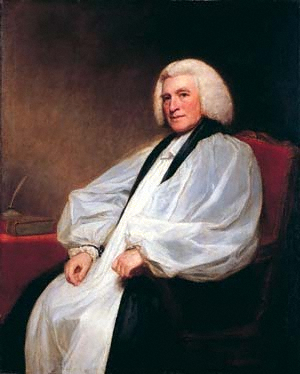
Edmund Law born 6 June

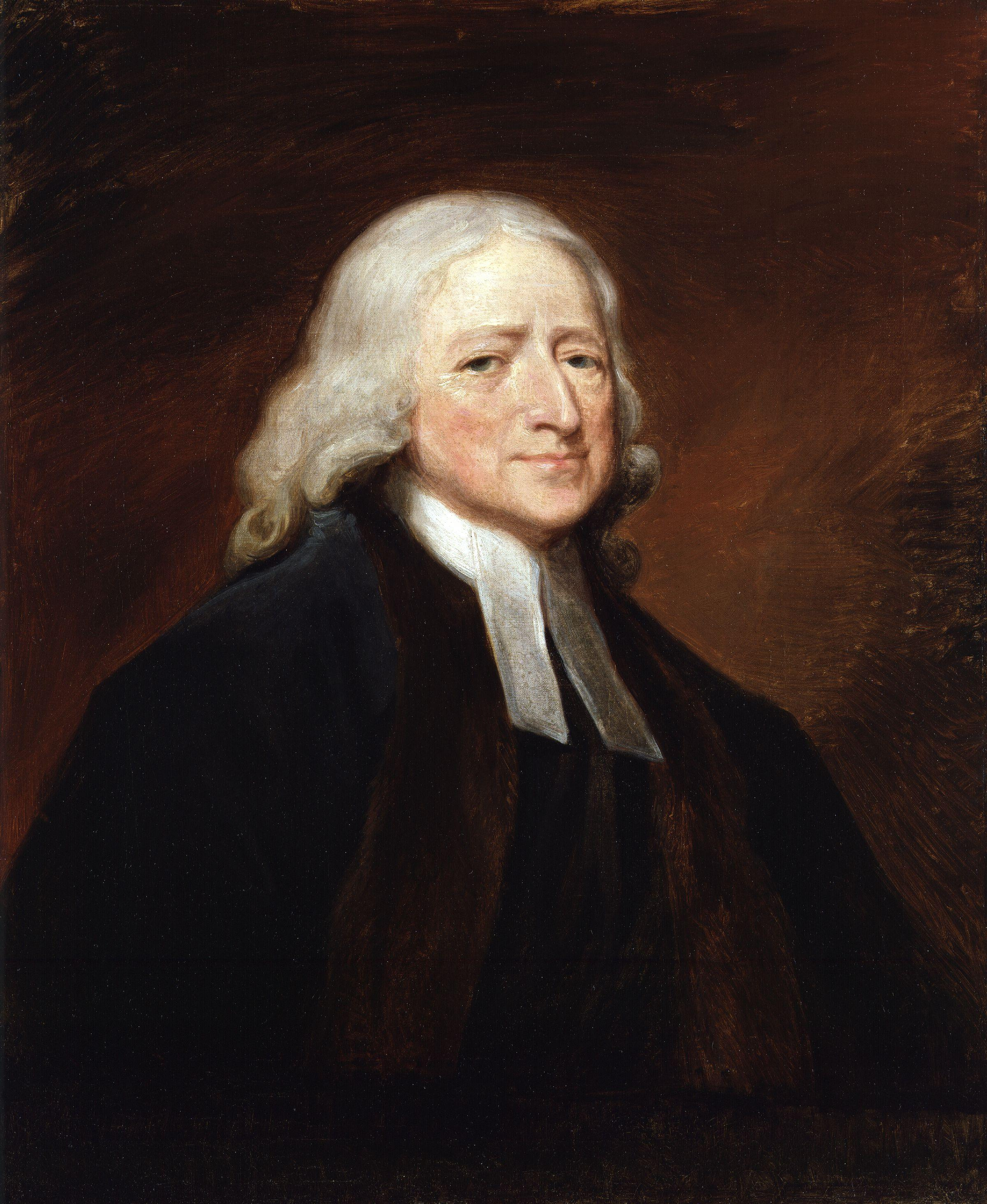
John Wesley born 28 June

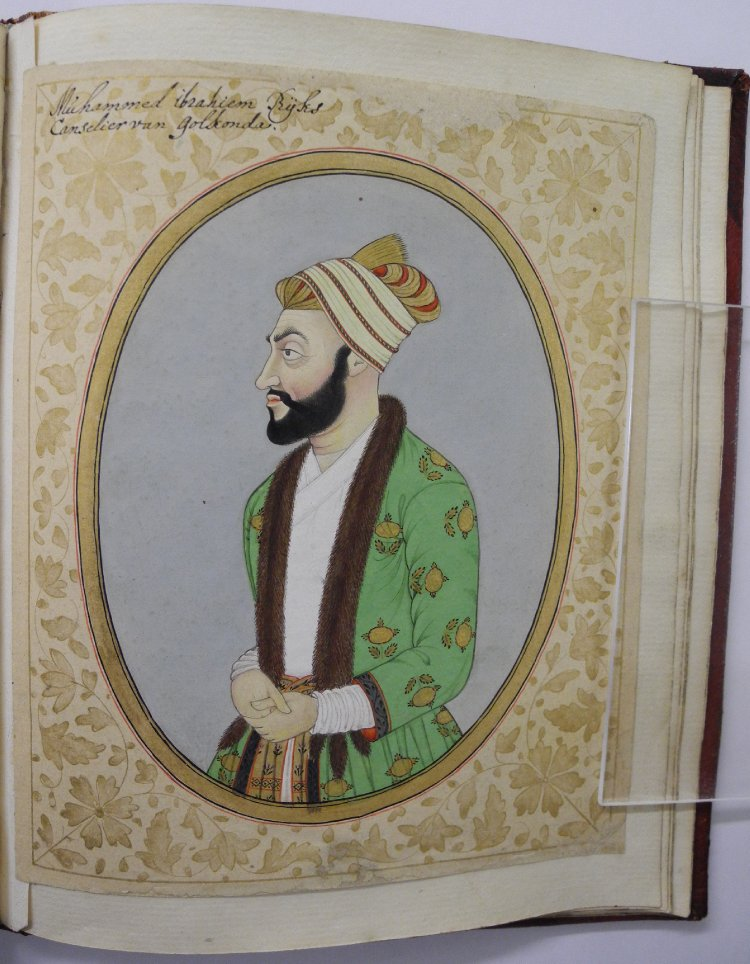
Muhammad Ibrahim (Mughal emperor) born 9 August

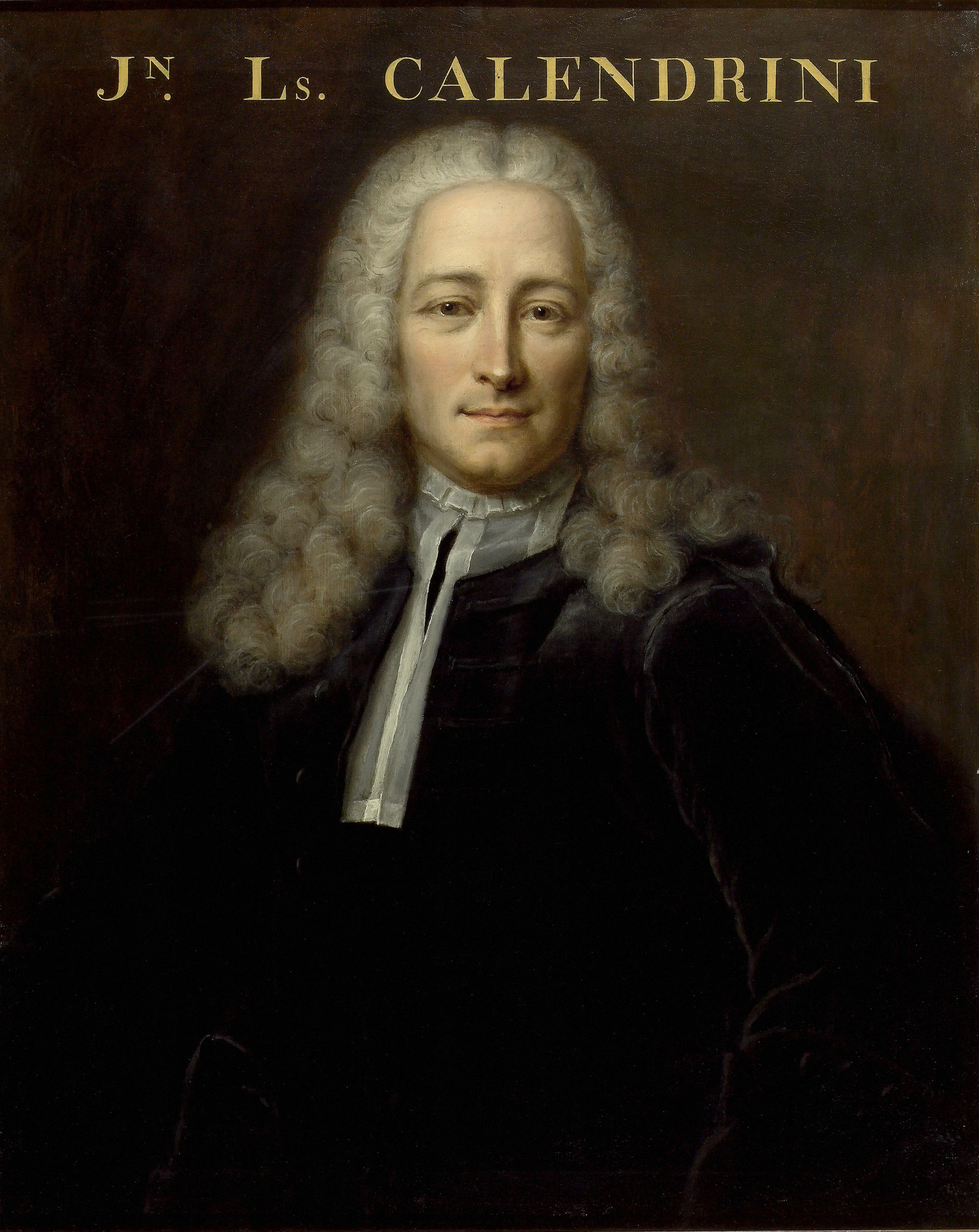
Jean-Louis Calandrini born 30 August

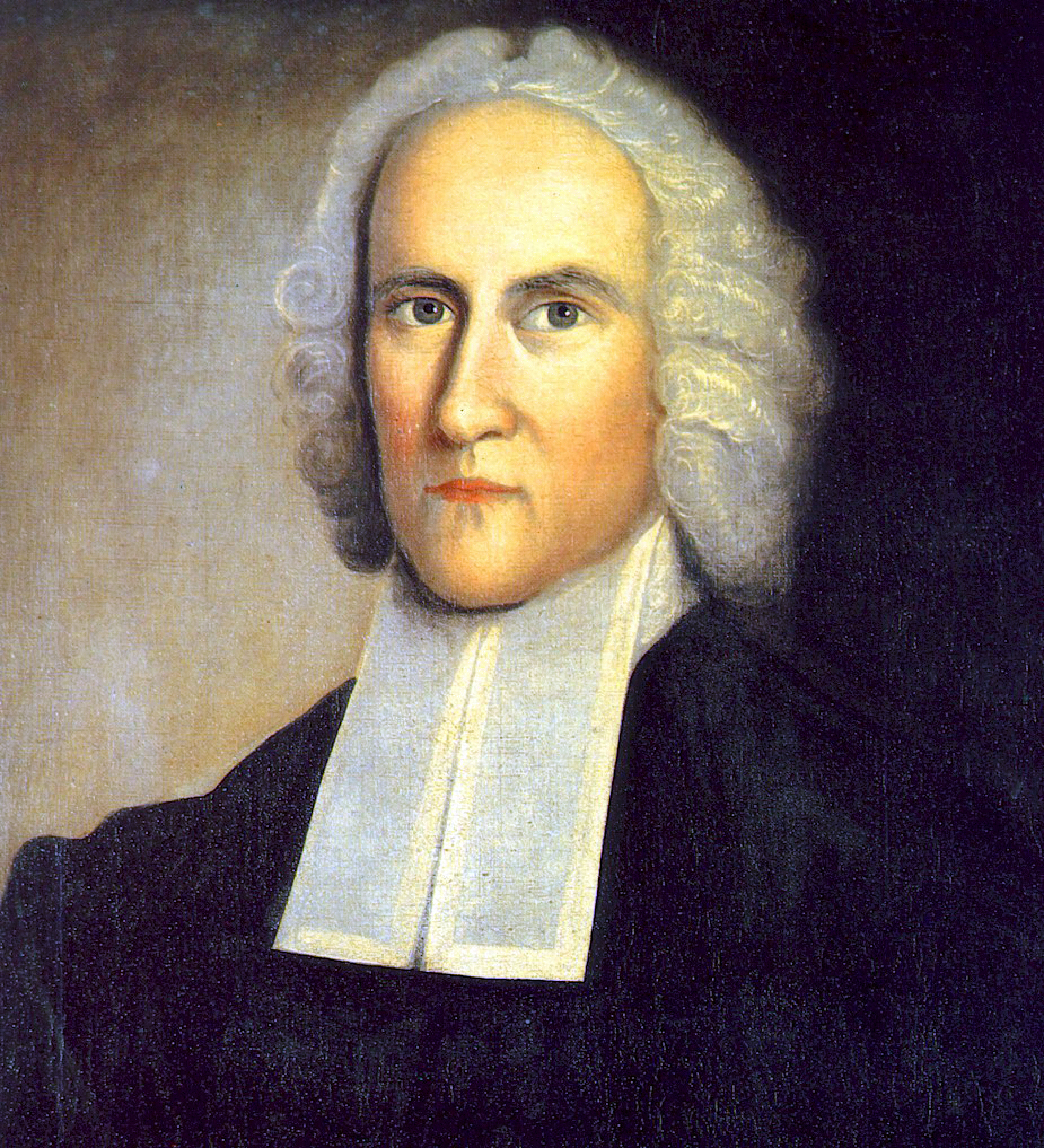
Jonathan Edwards (theologian) born 5 October

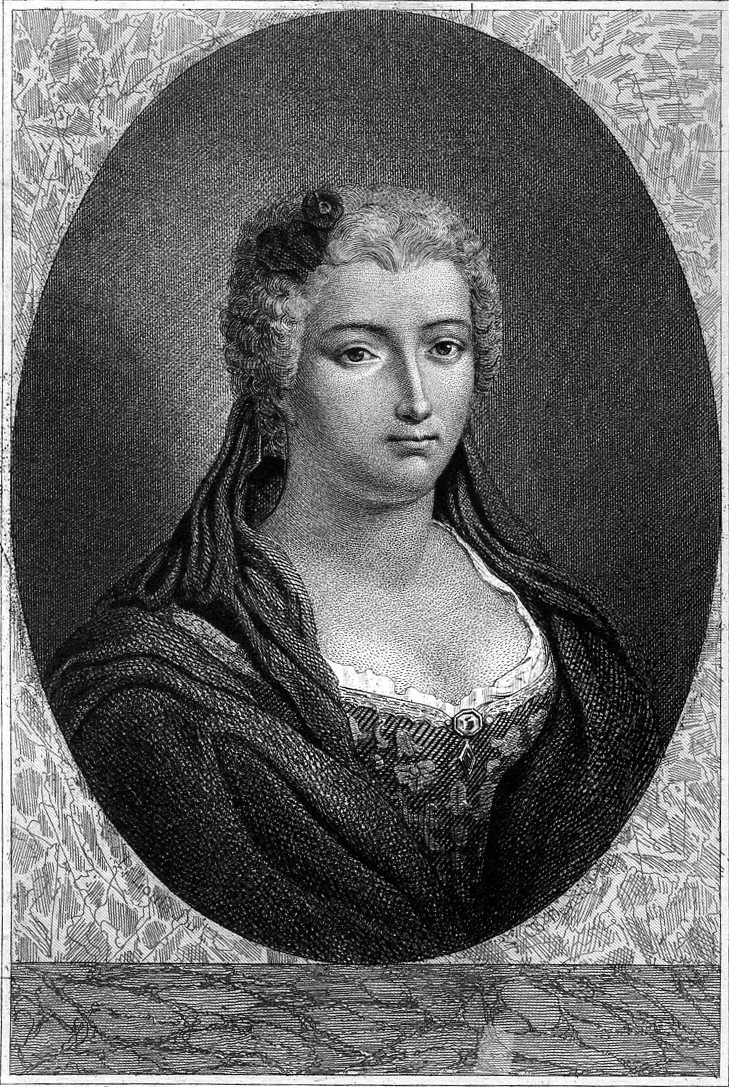
Louise Levesque born 23 November

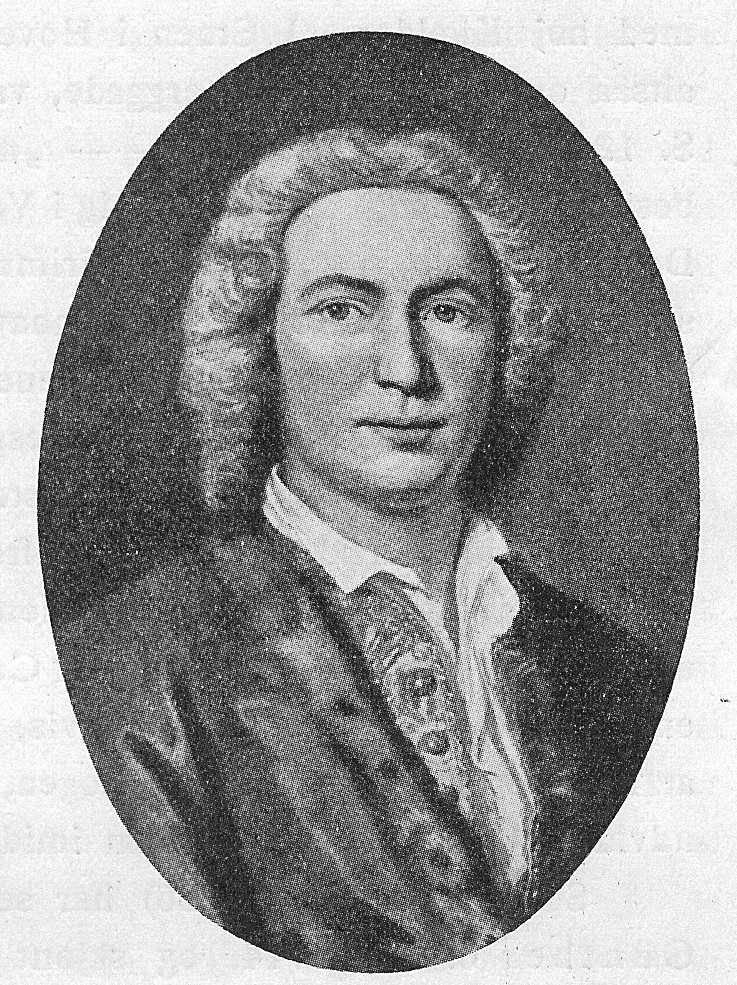
Simon Carl Stanley born 12 December

=== January–March ===
- January 1 – Heinrich Sigismund von der Heyde, Prussian army commander (d. 1765)
- January 2 – George Cholmondeley, 3rd Earl of Cholmondeley, English politician (d. 1770)
- January 3 – Daniel-Charles Trudaine, French administrator and civil engineer (d. 1769)
- January 5
  - James Hamilton, 5th Duke of Hamilton, Scottish peer (d. 1743)
  - Paul d'Albert de Luynes, French archbishop (d. 1788)
- January 8 – André Levret, French obstetrician, medical practitioner in Paris (d. 1780)
- January 10 – Christoph Birkmann, German theologian and minister (d. 1771)
- January 15
  - Henriette Louise de Bourbon, French princess by birth, member of the House of Bourbon (d. 1772)
  - John Brydges, Marquess of Carnarvon, English politician (d. 1727)
  - Johann Ernst Hebenstreit, German physician and naturalist (d. 1757)
- January 20 – Joseph-Hector Fiocco, Belgian composer and violinist (d. 1741)
- January 22 – Antoine Walsh, Irish-French slave trader and Jacobite (d. 1763)
- January 29 – Carlmann Kolb, German priest (d. 1765)
- January 31 – André-Joseph Panckoucke, French author and bookseller (d. 1753)
- February 2 – Richard Morris, Welsh writer and editor (d. 1779)
- February 3 – Jean Philippe de Bela, French military figure and Basque writer and historian (d. 1796)
- February 4
  - Jean Saas, French historian and bibliographer (d. 1774)
  - Andrew Stone, significant figure in the British royal circle, Member of Parliament (d. 1773)
- February 5 – Gilbert Tennent, Irish-born religious leader (d. 1764)
- February 8
  - Corrado Giaquinto, Italian Rococo painter (d. 1765)
  - François-Pierre Rigaud de Vaudreuil, soldier in New France (d. 1779)
- February 13 – Robert Dodsley, English bookseller, poet, playwright and miscellaneous writer (d. 1764)
- February 27 – Lord Sidney Beauclerk, English politician and fortune hunter (d. 1744)
- March 1 – Philip Tisdall, Attorney-General for Ireland (d. 1777)
- March 4 – Nicolas René Berryer, French magistrate and politician (d. 1762)
- March 5 (N. S.) – Vasily Trediakovsky, Russian poet (d. 1768)
- March 10 – Peter Warren, British Royal Navy officer (d. 1752)
- March 21 – Georg Andreas Sorge, Thuringian organist (d. 1778)
- March 23 – Cajsa Warg, Swedish cookbook author (d. 1769)

=== April–June ===
- April 8 – Benoît-Joseph Boussu, French violin maker (d. 1773)
- April 10 – Pierre Daubenton, French lawyer (d. 1776)
- April 24 – José Francisco de Isla, Spanish Jesuit (d. 1781)
- May 2 – James West, English antiquary (d. 1772)
- May 8 – Gottlob Harrer, German composer and choir leader (d. 1755)
- May 10 – John Winslow, British Army officer (d. 1774)
- May 12 – Countess Sophie Theodora of Castell-Remlingen, German noblewoman (d. 1777)
- May 14 – David Brearly, delegate to the U.S. Constitutional Convention (d. 1785)
- May 18
  - Jean Daullé, French engraver (d. 1763)
  - İbrahim Hakkı Erzurumi, Turkish Sufi saint (d. 1780)
- May 20 – René Lièvre de Besançon, French archer (d. 1739)
- June 6 – Edmund Law, priest in the Church of England (d. 1787)
- June 10 – Walter Butler, 16th Earl of Ormonde, Irish landowner (d. 1783)
- June 21 – Joseph Lieutaud, French physician (d. 1780)
- June 24 – Anne van Keppel, Countess of Albemarle (d. 1789)
- June 26 – Thomas Clap, first president of Yale University (d. 1767)
- June 28 – John Wesley, English founder of Methodism and anti-slavery activist (d. 1791)

=== July–September ===
- July 7 – Kenrick Prescot, English Anglican priest and academic (d. 1779)
- July 9 – Edward Shippen III, American merchant and mayor of Philadelphia (d. 1781)
- July 12 – Nicholas Hewetson, Anglican priest in Ireland (d. 1761)
- July 15 – Axel Lagerbielke, Swedish admiral and statesman (d. 1782)
- July 17 – Thomas Hancock, merchant in colonial Boston (d. 1764)
- August 2 – Lorenzo Ricci, Italian Jesuit leader (d. 1775)
- August 4 – Louis, Duke of Orléans, member of the royal family of France (d. 1752)
- August 9 – Muhammad Ibrahim, claimant to the throne of India (d. 1746)
- August 15 – Jacob Bicker Raije, writer from the Northern Netherlands (d. 1777)
- August 24 – François-Marie Le Marchand de Lignery, colonial military leader in the French province of Canada (d. 1759)
- August 30 – Jean-Louis Calandrini, Genevan scientist (d. 1758)
- September 1 – Just Fabritius, Danish merchant (d. 1766)
- September 3 – Johann Theodor of Bavaria, cardinal (d. 1763)
- September 6 – John Harris, British landowner and politician (d. 1768)
- September 15 – Guillaume-François Rouelle, French chemist (d. 1770)
- September 23 – Charlotte Howe, Viscountess Howe, Hanover-born British courtier and politician (d. 1782)
- September 29
  - François Boucher, French painter (d. 1770)
  - Baltzer Fleischer, Norwegian civil servant and county governor (d. 1767)
  - François Fresneau de La Gataudière, French botanist and scientist (d. 1770)
  - Philip Syng, Irish-born American silversmith (d. 1789)

=== October–December ===
- October 3 – Franz Christoph Janneck, Austrian painter in the Baroque style (d. 1761)
- October 5 – Jonathan Edwards, North American revivalist preacher (d. 1758)
- October 6 – Louis de Beaufort, French-Dutch historian known for his critical approach to the history of Rome (d. 1795)
- October 7 – Frederick, Hereditary Prince of Baden-Durlach, German hereditary prince (d. 1732)
- October 13
  - Andrea Belli, Maltese architect and businessman (d. 1772)
  - Otto Thott, Danish Count (d. 1785)
- October 15 – Benigna Gottliebe von Trotta genannt Treyden, Duchess consort of Courland (d. 1782)
- October 16
  - Joachim Faiguet de Villeneuve, French economist (d. 1781)
  - Henry Fane of Wormsley, English politician (d. 1777)
- October 22 – Edward Rudge, English politician (d. 1763)
- October 23 – Sir Alexander Dick, 3rd Baronet, Scottish landowner and physician (d. 1785)
- October 28
  - Andreas Bjørn, Danish merchant (d. 1750)
  - Antoine Deparcieux, French mathematician (d. 1768
- October 30 – James Hill, Scottish surgeon, advocate of curative excision for cancer (d. 1776)
- November 1 – Frederik Danneskiold-Samsøe, Danish politician (d. 1770)
- November 10 – Carlo Zuccari, Italian composer and violinist (d. 1792)
- November 17 – Adam Miller, German-born pioneer in the colony of Virginia (d. 1783)
- November 18 – Andrew Rollo, 5th Lord Rollo, Scottish army commander in Canada and Dominica during the Seven Years' War (d. 1765)
- November 22
  - Walter Pompe, Flemish master-sculptor (d. 1777)
  - Balthasar Riepp, German-Austrian painter (d. 1764)
- November 23 – Louise Levesque, French femme de lettres (d. 1743)
- November 25 – Jean-François Séguier, French astronomer and botanist (d. 1784)
- November 26 – Theophilus Cibber, English actor and writer (d. 1758)
- November 27 – James De Lancey, colonial governor of the province of New York (d. 1760)
- December 2 – Ferdinand Konščak, Croatian Jesuit missionary, explorer and cartographer (d. 1759)
- December 9 – Chester Moore Hall, British lawyer and inventor who produced the first achromatic lenses (d. 1771)
- December 12 – Simon Carl Stanley, Danish sculptor of English parentage (d. 1761)
- December 15
  - Johann Martin Boltzius, German born (d. 1765)
  - Frederick Ernest of Brandenburg-Kulmbach, member of the Brandenburg-Kulmbach branch of the House of Hohenzollern (d. 1762)
- December 23 – Stephen Cornwallis, career British Army officer and politician (d. 1743)
- December 24
  - Aleksei Chirikov, Russian navigator (d. 1748)
  - Christen Lindencrone, Danish landowner and supercargo of the Danish Asia Company (d. 1772)

=== Date unknown ===
- Johann Gottlieb Graun, German Baroque/Classical era composer and violinist (d. 1771)
- Muhammad ibn Abd al-Wahhab, Saudi Sunni scholar, theologian, preacher, activist, and religious leader (d. 1792)

== Deaths ==
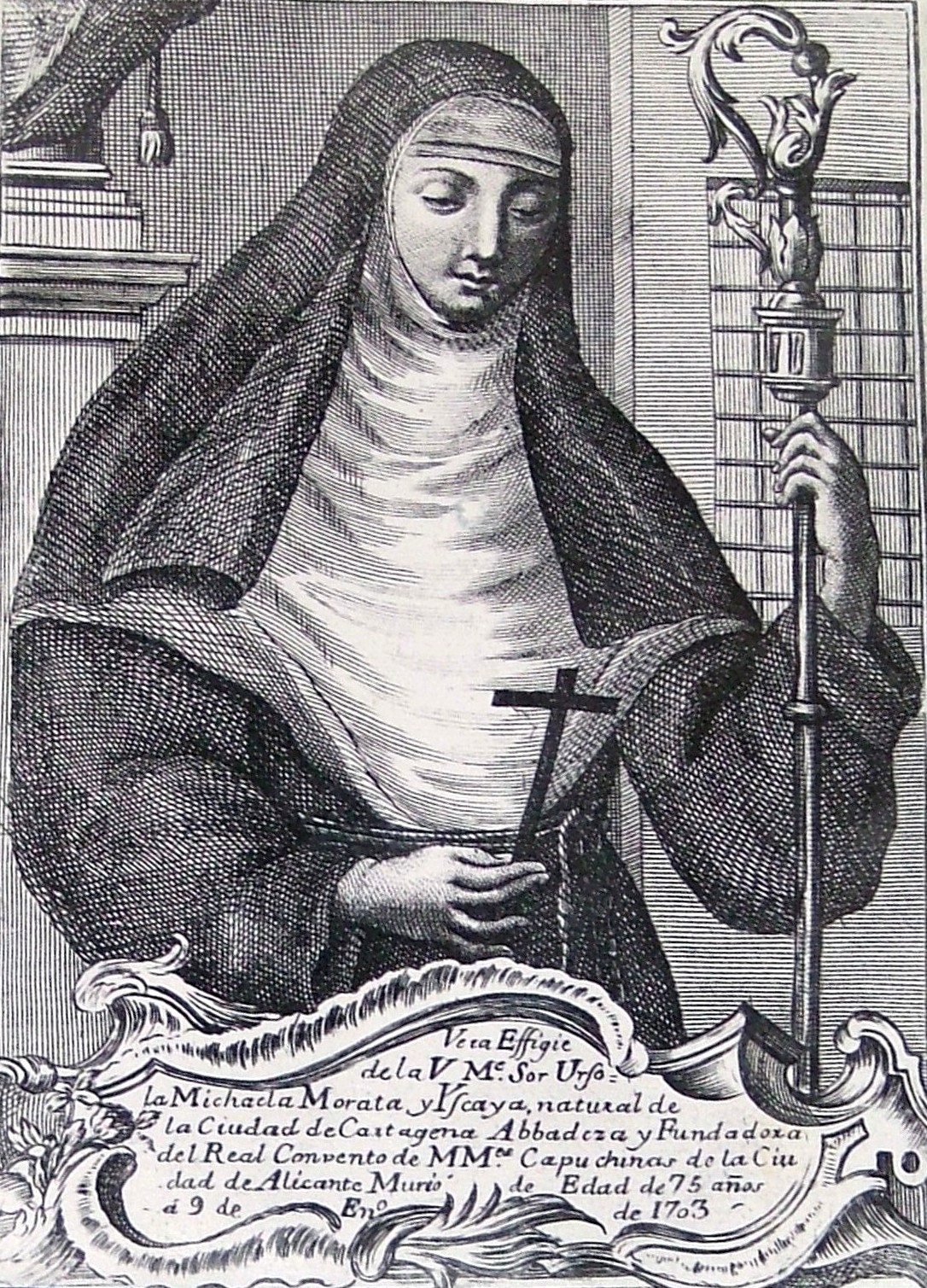
Úrsula Micaela Morata died 9 January

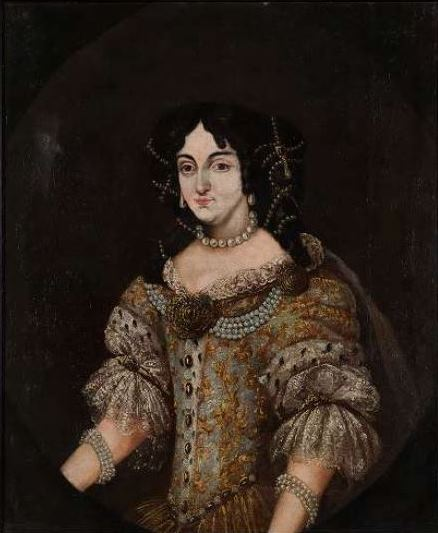
Ilona Zrínyi died 18 February

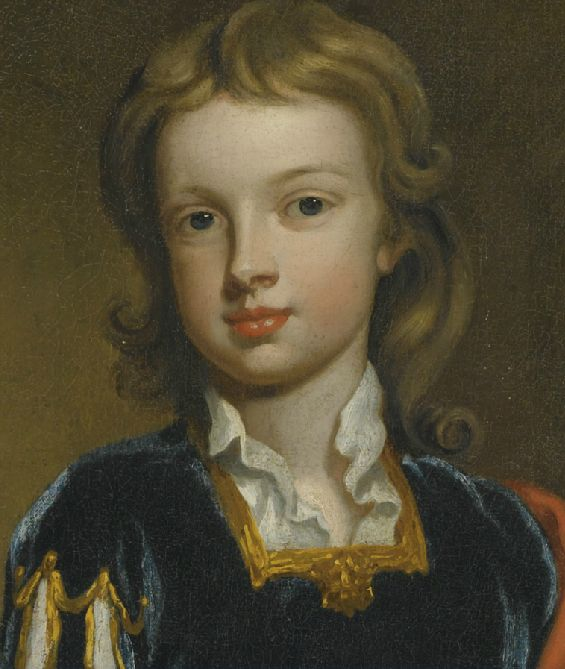
John Churchill, Marquess of Blandford died 20 February

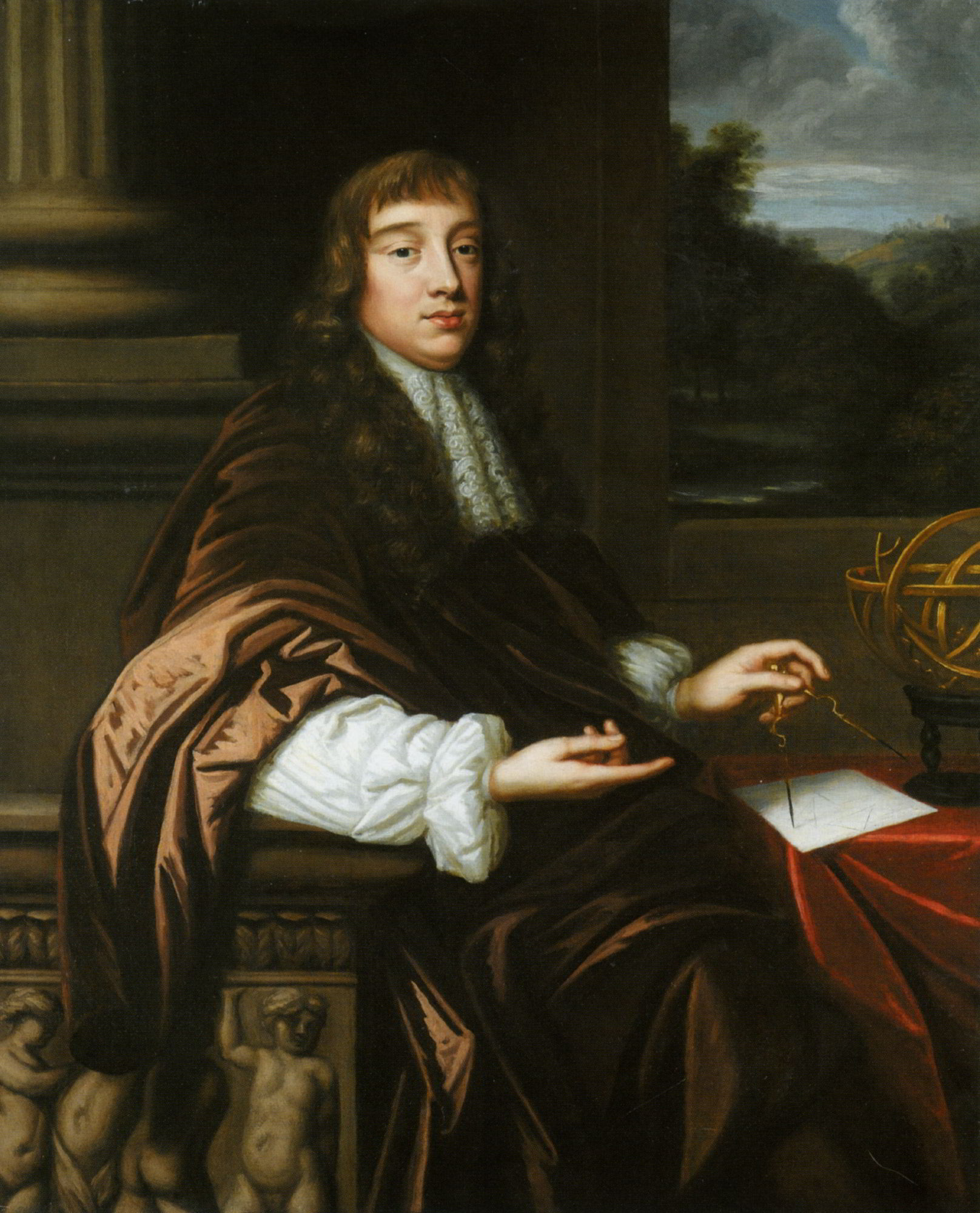
Robert Hooke died 3 March

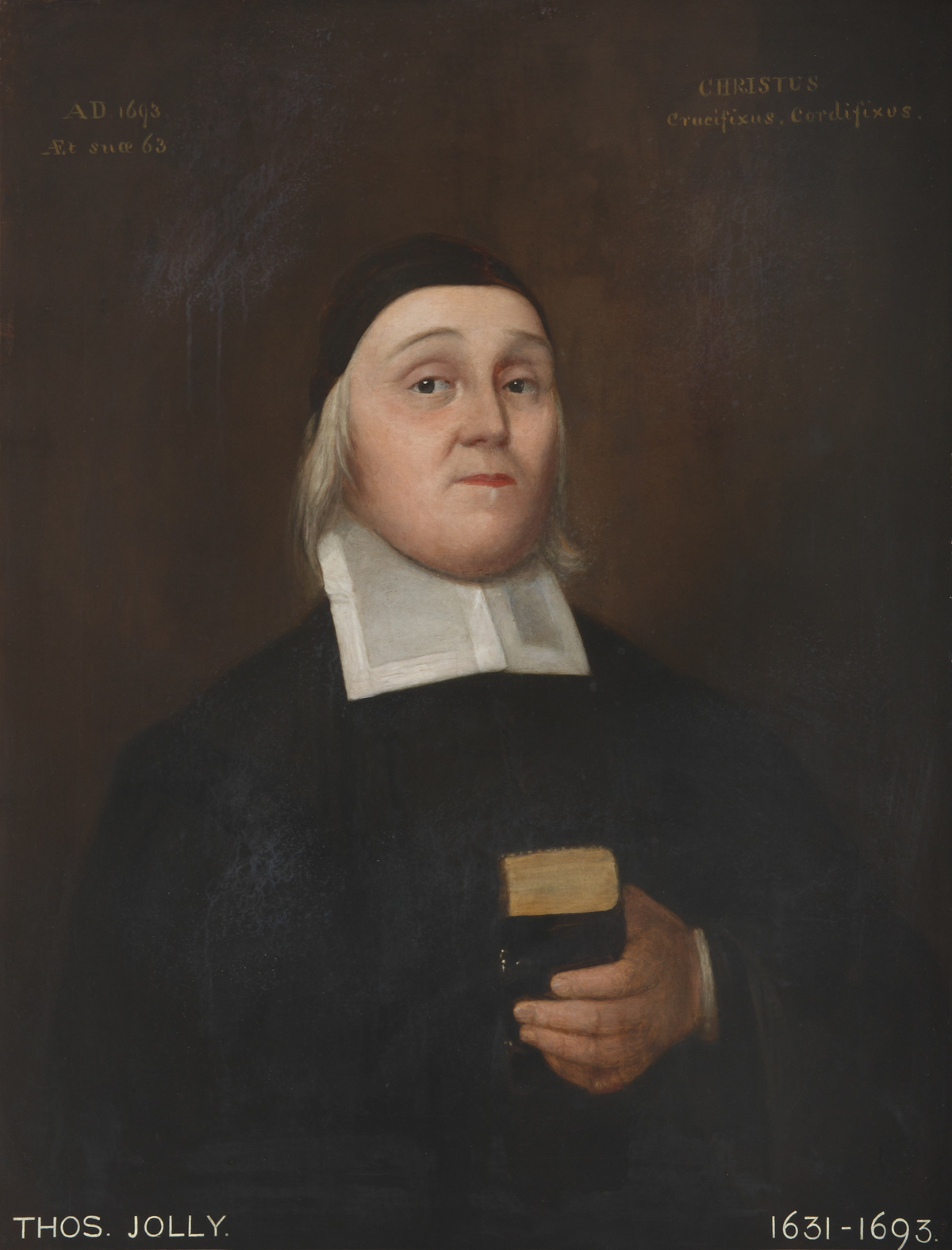
Thomas Jollie died 14 March

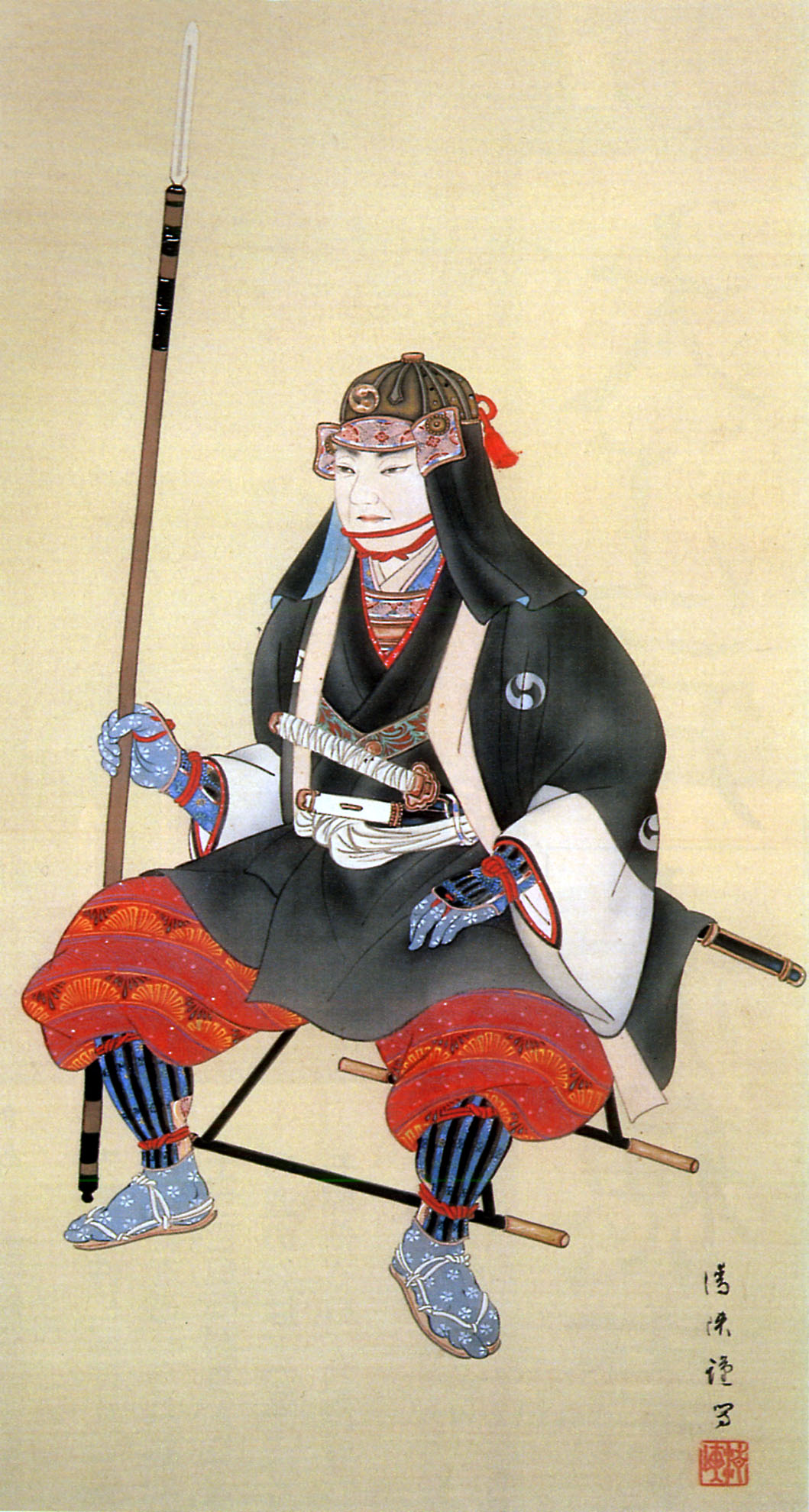
Ōishi Yoshio died 20 March

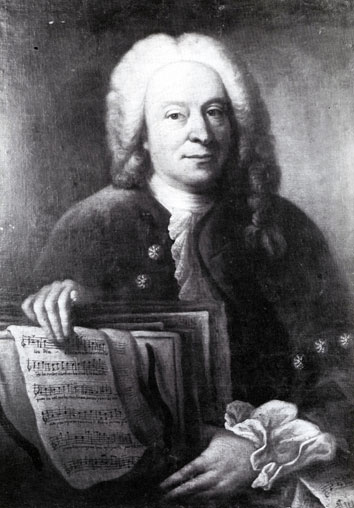
Johann Christoph Bach died 31 March

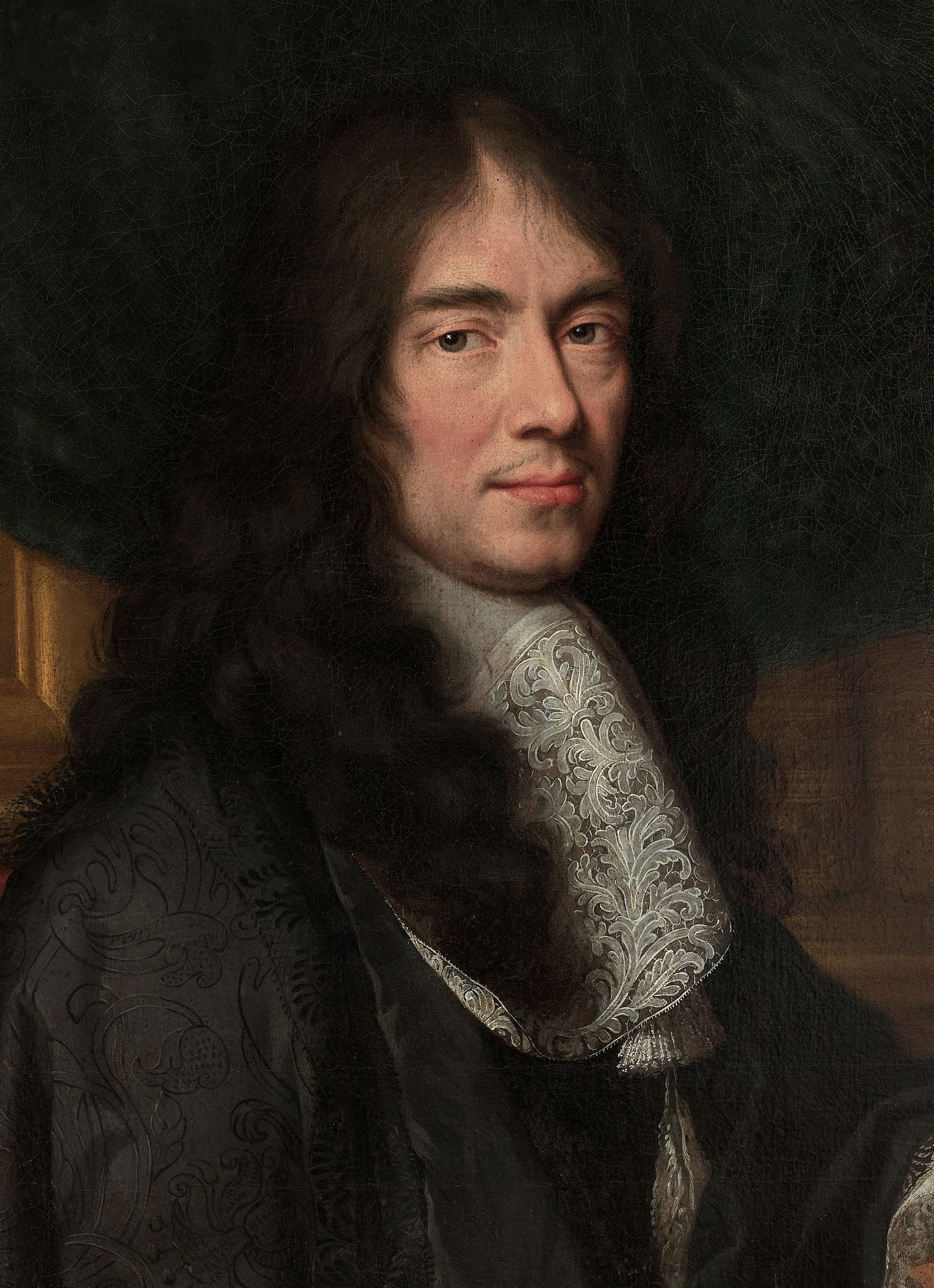
Charles Perrault died 16 May

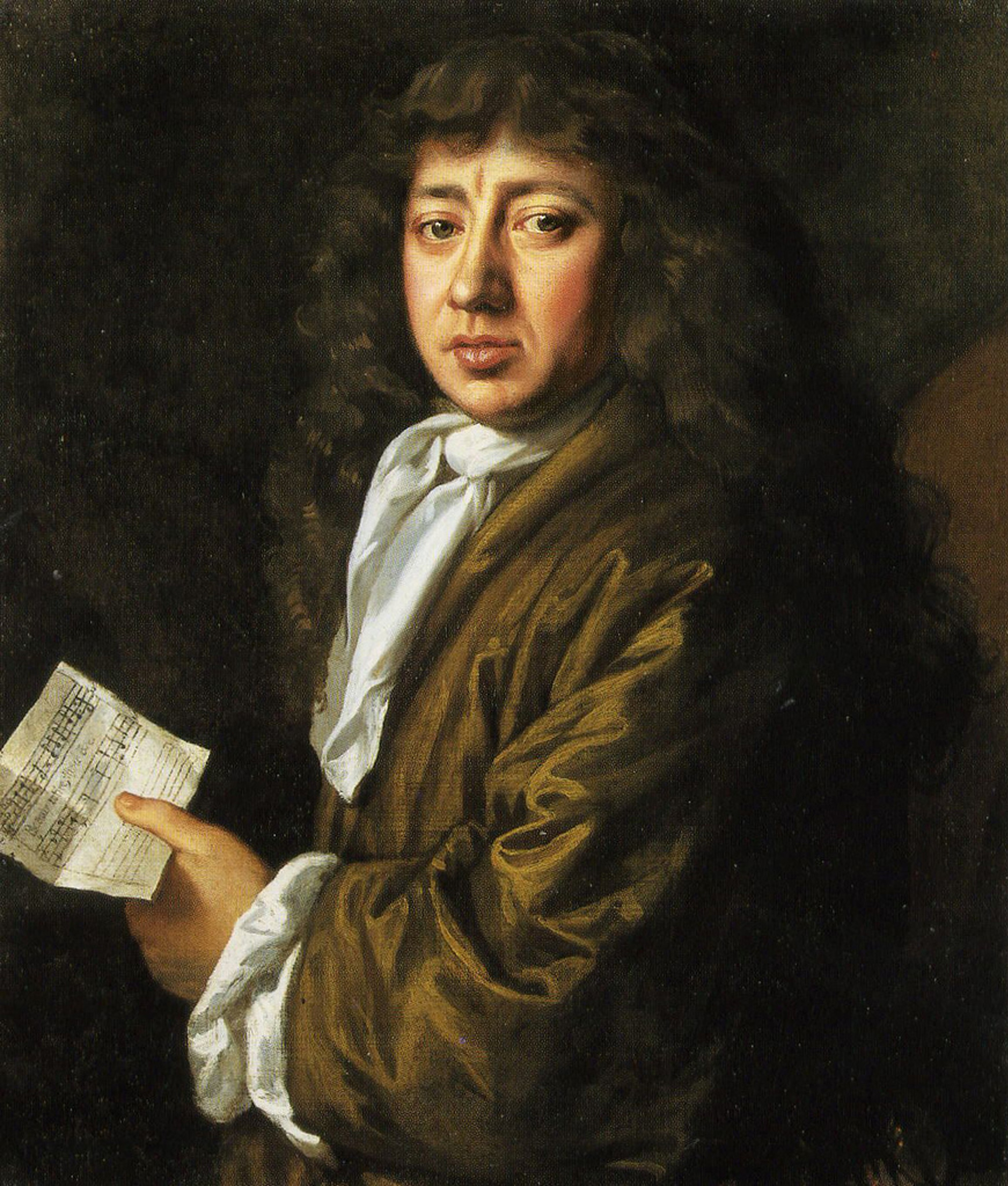
Samuel Pepys died 26 May

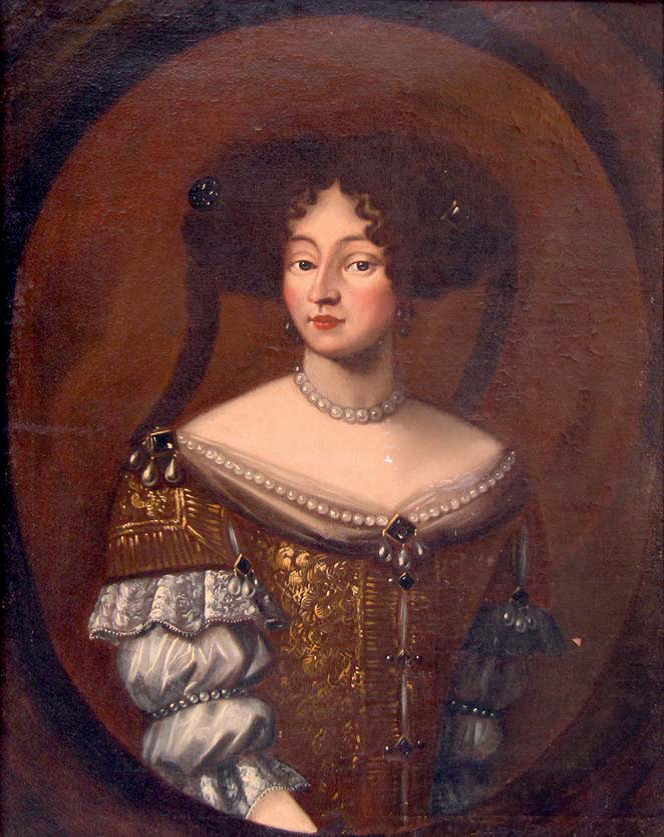
Anna Isabella Gonzaga died 11 August

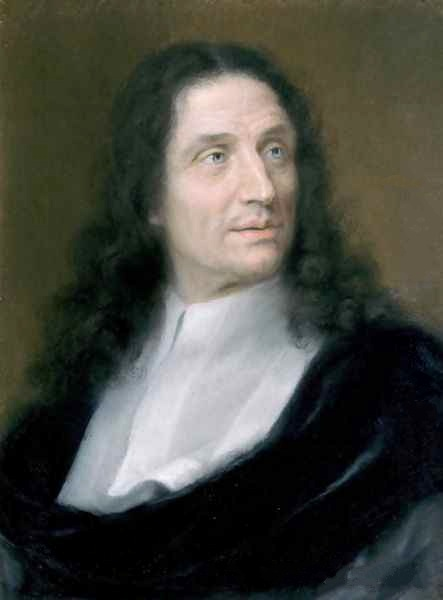
Vincenzo Viviani died 22 September

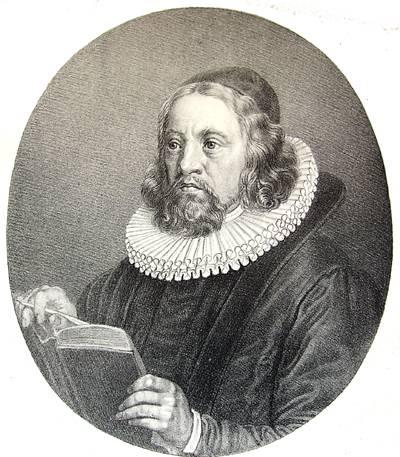
Thomas Kingo died 14 October

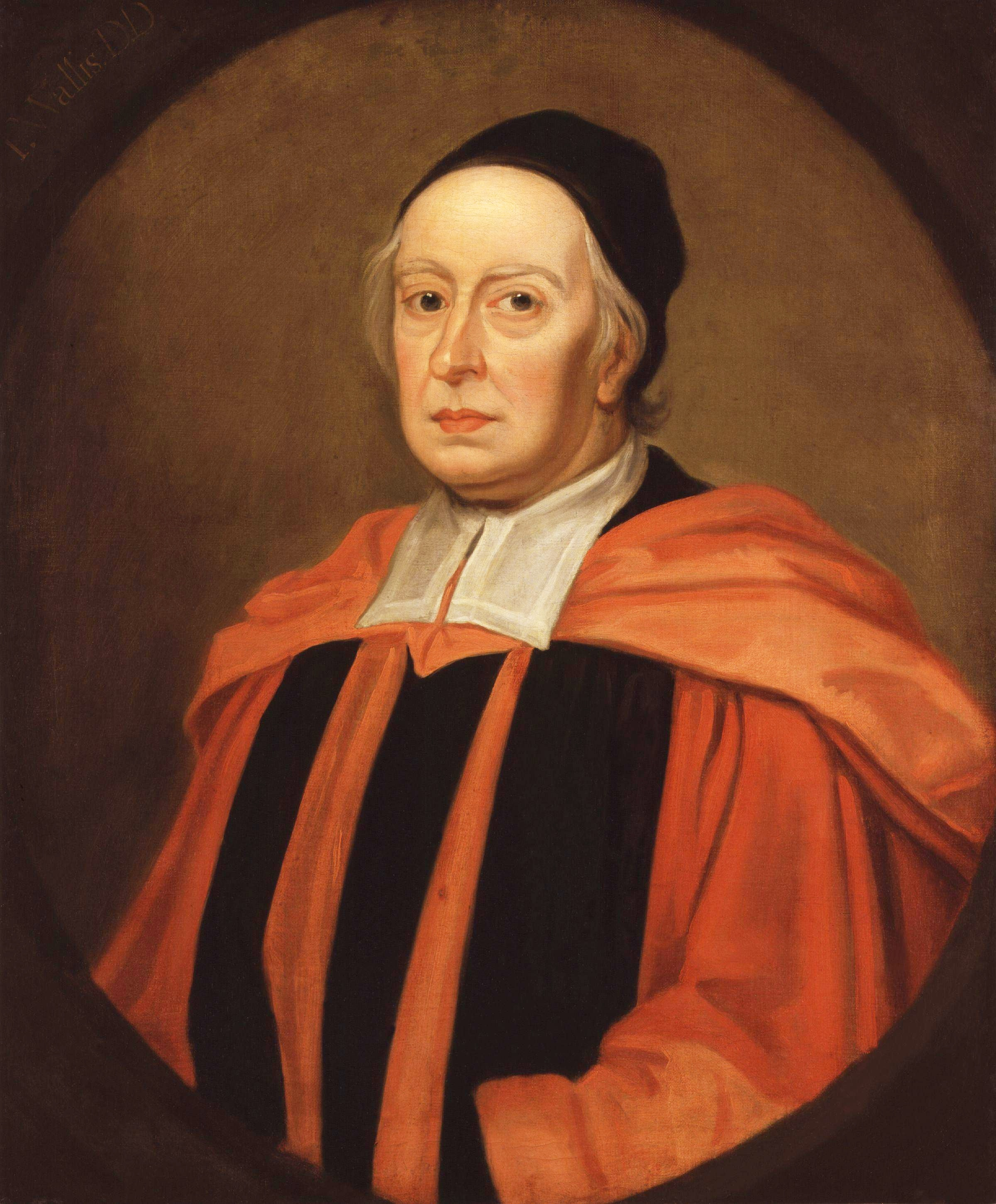
John Wallis died 8 November

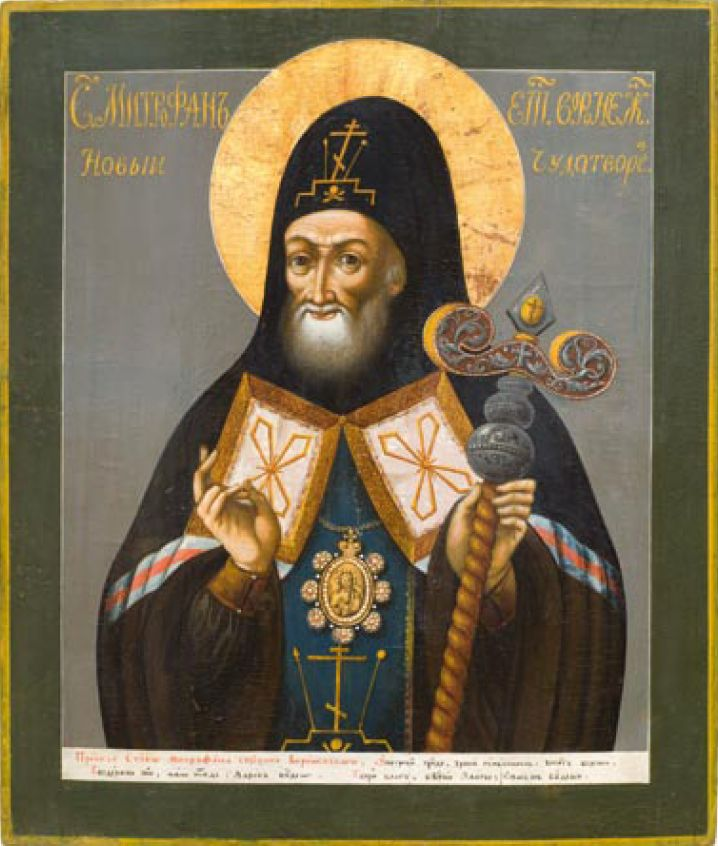
Mitrophan of Voronezh died 23 November

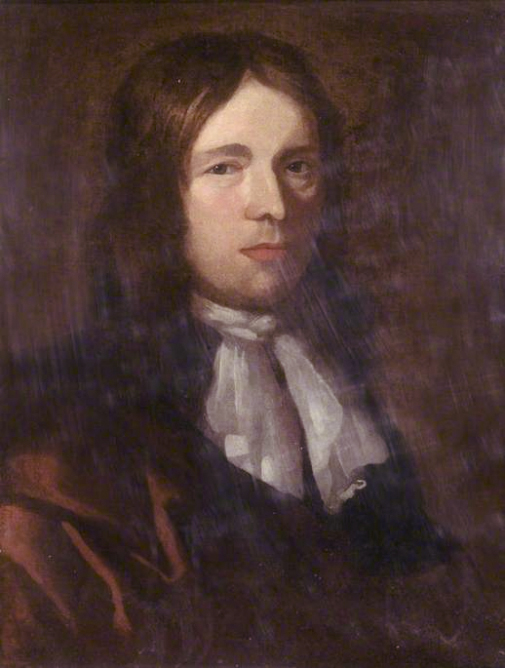
Henry Winstanley died 27 November

=== January ===
- January 2 – Charles Bécart de Granville et de Fonville, New France attorney, draughtsman and cartographer (b. 1675)
- January 6 – Charlotte Marie of Saxe-Jena, German noblewoman (b. 1669)
- January 7 – Francesco Civalli, Italian painter (b. 1660)
- January 8
  - Jonathan Atkins, Governor of Barbados (b. 1610)
  - Sir John Pelham, 3rd Baronet, Member of the English Parliament (b. 1623)
- January 9 – Úrsula Micaela Morata, Spanish writer (b. 1628)
- January 11 – Johann Georg Graevius, German classical scholar and critic (b. 1632)
- January 12 – Francesco Eschinardi, Italian mathematician (b. 1623)
- January 16 – Erik Dahlbergh, Swedish count, army officer, architect and official (b. 1625)
- January 31
  - Rafał Leszczyński, Polish nobleman (b. 1650)
  - Kira Yoshinaka, Samurai, famous for 47 Ronin stories (b. 1641)

=== February ===
- February 5 – Phetracha, king of Ayutthaya (b. 1632)
- February 11 – Godert de Ginkel, 1st Earl of Athlone, Dutch general in the service of England (b. 1644)
- February 15 – Robert Kerr, 1st Marquess of Lothian, Scottish nobleman (b. 1636)
- February 18
  - Thomas Hyde, British orientalist (b. 1636)
  - Ilona Zrínyi, Princess Consort of Transylvania, Croatian noblewoman (b. 1643)
- February 20
  - William Bradford, American political and military leader (b. 1624)
  - John Churchill, Marquess of Blandford, British noble (b. 1686)
- February 21 – George Oxenden, British academic, lawyer and politician (b. 1651)
- February 22 – Mosen Vicente Bru, Spanish painter (b. 1682)
- February 28 – Sir Roger Twisden, 2nd Baronet, British Baronet (b. 1640)

=== March ===
- March 3
  - Christoffer Heidemann, Dano-Norwegian government official (b. 1623)
  - Robert Hooke, English natural philosopher, architect and polymath (b. 1635)
- March 4 – George Gordon, 15th Earl of Sutherland, Scottish noble (b. 1633)
- March 5 – Gabrielle Suchon, French philosopher (b. 1632)
- March 6 – Thomas St George, English herald (b. 1615)
- March 9
  - Friedemann Bechmann, German theologian (b. 1628)
  - Alexander Chalmers Polish-Scottish merchant, jurist, and politician, mayor of Old Warsaw (b. 1645)
- March 12 – Aubrey de Vere, 20th Earl of Oxford, Royalist during the English Civil War (b. 1627)
- March 14
  - Ferdinand Maximilian I of Isenburg-Wächtersbach, count (b. 1662)
  - Thomas Jollie, English Dissenter (b. 1629)
- March 18 – Maria de Dominici, Maltese artist, sculptor (b. 1645)
- March 20
  - Johann von Löwenstern-Kunckel, Swedish noble and chemist (b. 1630)
  - Takebayashi Takashige, Samurai, one of the 47 rōnin (b. 1672)
  - Horibe Yasubee, Samurai, one of the 47 rōnin (b. 1670)
  - Ōishi Yoshio, Samurai, leader of the 47 rōnin (b. 1659)
- March 22 – Giuseppe Maria Pignatelli, Roman Catholic bishop (b. 1660)
- March 29 – George Frederick II, Margrave of Brandenburg-Ansbach (b. 1678)
- March 30 – Lazzaro Baldi, Italian painter and engraver (b. 1623)
- March 31 – Johann Christoph Bach, German composer and organist (b. 1642)

=== April ===
- April 1 – Thomas Jermyn, 2nd Baron Jermyn, Governor of Jersey (b. 1633)
- April 4 – Philip Florinus of Sulzbach, Austrian field marshal (b. 1630)
- April 8 – Domenico Piola, Italian painter (b. 1627)
- April 9 – Ignacio de Urbina, Spanish prelate (b. 1632)
- April 13 – Victoria Davia-Montecuculi Modenese noblewoman (b. 1655)
- April 16 – Richard Kirkby, Royal Navy officer (b. 1658)
- April 18
  - Denis Granville, English priest (b. 1636)
  - Franciscus Liberati, Italian Catholic archbishop (b. 1615)
- April 20
  - Lancelot Addison, English royal chaplain (b. 1632)
  - Andrew Hamilton, Colonial governor of East and West New Jersey (b. 1676)
- April 23 – Otto Wilhelm von Fersen, Swedish field marshal (b. 1623)
- April 27 – Yasui Sanchi, Japanese Go player (b. 1617)

=== May ===
- May 3
  - Sir Richard Howe, 2nd Baronet, Member of Parliament of England (b. 1621)
  - Eglon van der Neer, painter from the Northern Netherlands (b. 1630)
  - Samuel Oppenheimer, German-Jewish financier (b. 1630)
- May 4 – Louis de Béchameil, Marquis of Nointel, French businessman (b. 1630)
- May 6 – John Murray, 1st Marquess of Atholl, Scottish judge (b. 1631)
- May 8 – Vincent Alsop, English clergyman (b. 1630)
- May 10 – Edward Jones, English bishop of St Asaph, (b. 1641)
- May 11 – William Rawlinson, English lawyer (b. 1640)
- May 16 – Charles Perrault, French author (b. 1628)
- May 18 – Moritz Hermann of Limburg, count of Limburg Stirum (b. 1664)
- May 23 – Peter Werenfels, Swiss religious servant and theologian (b. 1627)
- May 26
  - Louis-Hector de Callière, Governor of New France (b. 1648)
  - Samuel Pepys, English diarist and administrator (b. 1633)
- May 28 – Benjamin Fletcher, Governor of the province of New York (b. 1640)

=== June ===
- June 4 – Philis de La Charce, French war hero (b. 1645)
- June 13 – Tōdō Takahisa, Japanese daimyō (b. 1638)
- June 14 – Jean Hérault, Baron of Gourville, French adventurer (b. 1625)
- June 15 – Gilles Schey, Dutch admiral (b. 1644)
- June 19 – William Stanhope, English politician (b. 1626)

=== July ===
- July 11 – Piero de Bonzi, Catholic cardinal (b. 1631)
- July 16 – Robert Brudenell, 2nd Earl of Cardigan, English peer (b. 1607)
- July 17 – Roemer Vlacq, Dutch naval commander (b. 1637)
- July 20
  - Changning, Prince Gong, Qing Dynasty prince (b. 1657)
  - Statz Friedrich von Fullen, German-born nobleman (b. 1638)
- July 25 – Sir Robert Marsham, 4th Baronet, English politician (b. 1650)
- July 26 – Gérard Audran, French engraver (b. 1640)
- July 28 – Umaru Pulavar, Indian writer (b. 1642)
- July 29 – Francesco Marucelli, Italian abbot and bibliographer (b. 1625)

=== August ===
- August 5 – Satake Yoshizumi, Japanese daimyō and clan chieftain (b. 1637)
- August 10 – Fuquan, Prince Yu, Chinese Qing Dynasty prince (b. 1653)
- August 11 – Anna Isabella Gonzaga, noble (b. 1655)
- August 14 – Pintea the Brave, Romanian rebel (b. 1670)
- August 21 – Thomas Tryon, British hat maker (b. 1634)
- August 24 – Lionel Boyle, 3rd Earl of Orrery, Member of the Parliament of England (b. 1671)
- August 26 – Adam II. Batthyány, Chief Justice (b. 1662)
- August 28 – Francisco Bravo de Saravia, 1st Marquess of la Pica, Spanish nobleman (b. 1628)

=== September ===
- September 1 – Edward Clarke, English merchant and Lord Mayor of London (b. 1627)
- September 3 – Giuseppe Maria Ficatelli, Italian painter (b. 1639)
- September 9 – Charles de Saint-Évremond, French soldier, hedonist, essayist and literary critic (b. 1613)
- September 14 – Gilles Jullien, French organist and composer (b. 1653)
- September 22 – Vincenzo Viviani, Italian mathematician and scientist (b. 1622)
- September 25 – Archibald Campbell, 1st Duke of Argyll, Scottish privy councillor (b. 1658)
- September 30 – Walter J. Johnson, English explorer and fur trader (b. 1611)

=== October ===
- October 3 – Alessandro Melani, Italian composer (b. 1639)
- October 5 – Anthony Ettrick, English politician (b. 1622)
- October 8 – Tomás Marín de Poveda, 1st Marquis of Cañada Hermosa, Royal Governor of Chile (b. 1650)
- October 11 – Roger Cave, English politician and baronet (b. 1655)
- October 14 – Thomas Kingo, Danish bishop, poet, hymn-writer (b. 1634)
- October 22 – Ferdinand, Prince of Schwarzenberg, Czech marshall and nobleman (b. 1652)
- October 24
  - Charles Gustav of Baden-Durlach, German general (b. 1648)
  - William Burkitt, English priest (b. 1650)

=== November ===
- November 8 – John Wallis, English mathematician (b. 1616)
- November 9 – Stefano Sculco, Roman Catholic prelate, Bishop of Gerace (b. 1638)
- November 11 – Ivan Antun Zrinski, Count of Croatia (b. 1651)
- November 16 – Jules Mascaron, Roman Catholic bishop (b. 1634)
- November 19 – Man in the Iron Mask, prisoner, among the most famous in French history (b. 1640)
- November 23 – Mitrophan of Voronezh, Russian orthodox bishop (b. 1623)
- November 26 – Richard Kidder, British bishop (b. 1633)
- November 27 – Henry Winstanley, English engineer and painter (b. 1644)
- November 30 – Nicolas de Grigny, French composer and organist (b. 1672)

=== December ===
- December 1 – Johann Dietrich von Haxthausen (b. 1652)
- December 20 – Giuseppe Nuvolone, Italian painter (b. 1619)
- December 22 – Alessandro Ciceri, Bishop of Nanjing (b. 1639)
- December 24 – Leone Strozzi, Italian religious (b. 1637)
- December 26 – Johann Sturm, Neuburger philosopher (b. 1635)
- December 27 – Tommaso Rues, Italian sculptor (b. 1633)
- December 29
  - Bartholomew Van Homrigh, lord Mayor of Dublin, Ireland (b. 1665)
  - Mustafa II, 22nd Sultan of the Ottoman Empire (b. 1664)
  - Pierre Monier, French painter (b. 1641)
- date unknown – Anastasiya Dabizha, princess of Moldavia and Wallachia and Hetmana of Ukraine.
