= 1703 in France =

- Decades: 1680s; 1690s; 1700s; 1710s; 1720s
- See also: History of France; Timeline of French history; List of years in France

Events from the year 1703 in France.

== Incumbents ==
- Monarch – Louis XIV

== Events ==
- 20 February – 10 March – War of the Spanish Succession: Siege of Kehl – French forces under the command of the Duc de Villars capture the fortress of the Holy Roman Empire at Kehl, opposite Strasbourg on the Rhine.
- 19 March – 15 May – War of the Spanish Succession: Siege of Guadeloupe – An English expeditionary force fails to capture the island capital Basse-Terre in the French West Indies.
- 21 March – Jeanne Guyon is freed in Paris after more than seven years imprisonment for heresy in the Bastille.
- 7 September – War of the Spanish Succession: The town of Breisach is retaken for France by Camille d'Hostun, duc de Tallard.
- 11 October – Nine Roman Catholic residents of the village of Sainte-Cécile-d'Andorge are massacred by a mob of more than 800 Huguenot Protestants, the Camisards. A reprisal against Protestants in the nearby village of Branoux is made less than three weeks later.
- 30 October – More than 47 Huguenots in the village of Branoux-les-Taillades are massacred by Roman Catholic vigilantes in reprisal for the 11 October attack in Sainte-Cécile, 3.3 km away.
- 15 November – War of the Spanish Succession: Battle of Speyerbach (in modern-day Germany) – The French defeat a German relief army, allowing the French to take the besieged town of Landau two days later, for which Tallard is made a Marshal of France.
- 19 November – The Man in the Iron Mask dies in the Bastille.

== Births ==
- 3 January – Daniel-Charles Trudaine, administrator and civil engineer (died 1769)
- 8 January – André Levret, obstetrician (died 1780)
- 5 January – Paul d'Albert de Luynes, archbishop (died 1788)
- 15 January – Henriette Louise de Bourbon, princess (died 1772)
- 22 January – Antoine Walsh, slave trader and Jacobite (died 1763)
- 31 January – André-Joseph Panckoucke, author and bookseller (died 1753)
- 3 February – Jean Philippe de Bela, military figure and Basque writer and historian (died 1796)
- 4 February – Jean Saas, historian and bibliographer (died 1774)
- 3 March – Charles-Joseph Natoire, rococo painter (died 1777)
- 4 March – Nicolas René Berryer, magistrate and politician (died 1762)
- 8 April – Benoît-Joseph Boussu, violin maker (died 1773)
- 10 April – Pierre Daubenton, lawyer (died 1776)
- 18 May – Jean Daullé, engraver (died 1763)
- 20 May – René Lièvre de Besançon, archer (died 1739)
- 21 June – Joseph Lieutaud, physician (died 1780)
- 4 August – Louis, Duke of Orléans, member of the royal family (died 1752)
- 15 September – Guillaume-François Rouelle, chemist (d. 1770)
- 29 September
  - François Boucher, painter (died 1770)
  - François Fresneau de La Gataudière, botanist and scientist (died 1770)
- 16 October – Joachim Faiguet de Villeneuve, economist (died 1781)
- 28 October – Antoine Deparcieux, mathematician (died 1768)
- 23 November – Louise Levesque, femme de lettres (died 1743)
- 25 November – Jean-François Séguier, astronomer and botanist (died 1784)
- Charles Clémencet, Benedictine historian (died 1778)

== Deaths ==
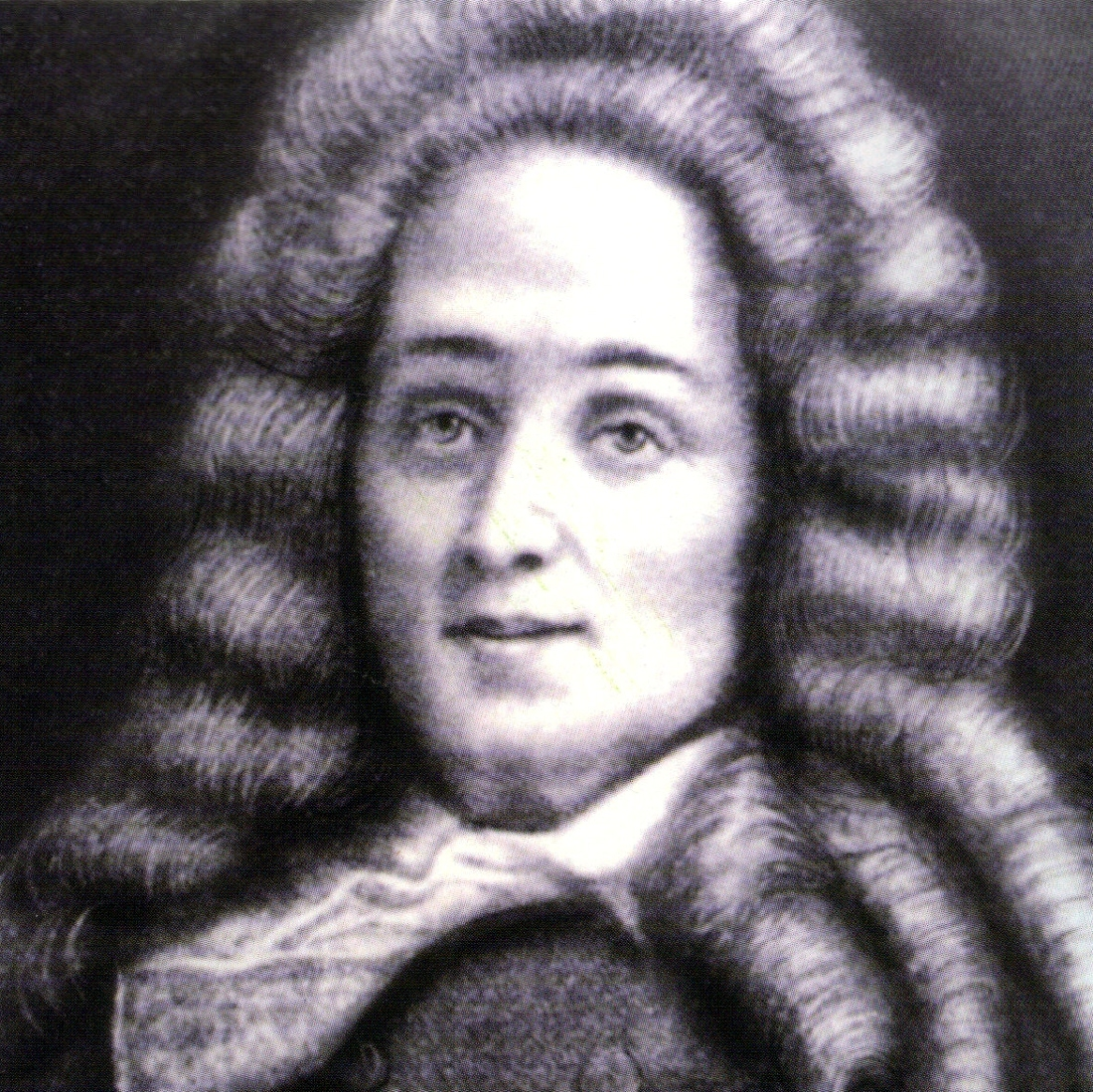
Louis-Hector de Callière

- 16 May – Charles Perrault, author (born 1628)
- 26 May – Louis-Hector de Callière, politician, governor of Montreal (born in 1648)
- 26 July – Gérard Audran, engraver (born 1640)
- 30 November – Nicolas de Grigny, organist and composer
