= Franz Christoph Janneck =

Austrian painter

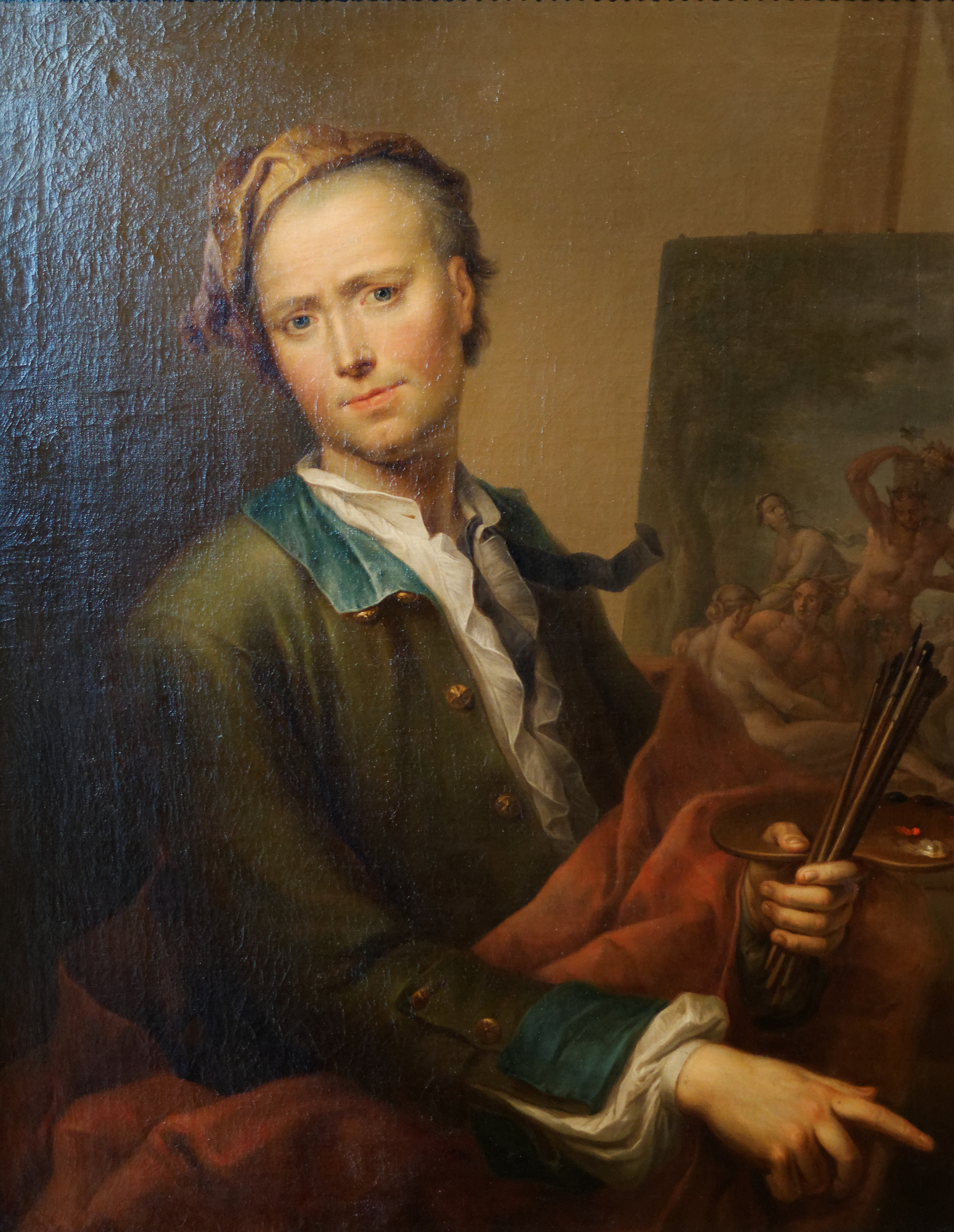
Self-portrait (1740)

Franz Christoph Janneck (3 October 1703, Graz - 13 January 1761, Vienna) was an Austrian painter in the Baroque style. He specialized in genre scenes, often with mythological themes, as well as some portraits, landscapes and religious works.

== Biography ==
His father, Martin Jänneg (or Jänickh, ?-1709) was a minor artist, originally from Croatia. His mother, Anna, was from Lugano. His brother, Matthias (born 1707) also became a painter.

After completing his secondary education in Graz, he took art lessons from a little known still-life painter named Matthias Vangus (fl. 1710s-20s). He moved to Vienna in 1726 and became a student of the court painter, Jacob van Schuppen, who had just become Director of the "Hofakademie der Maler, Bildhauer und Baukunst" (now the Academy of Fine Arts). A short time later, he continued his studies in Frankfurt with the Hungarian-born painter, Josef Orient.

In 1736, he married Anna Maria Canton, daughter of the painter Franz Canton (1678–1733).

He returned to Vienna around 1740. Soon after, his paintings began to rely more heavily on Dutch and French models; losing their previous originality. Later, he took over management of a genre painting class at the academy and served as Rector from 1752 to 1754, when he resigned, following his wife's death.

Many of his works are in private collections, although they may also be seen at the Universalmuseum Joanneum, the Belvedere, the Brukenthal National Museum and the collections of the National Gallery in Prague.

A street in the Hietzing district of Vienna is named after him.

== Selected works ==
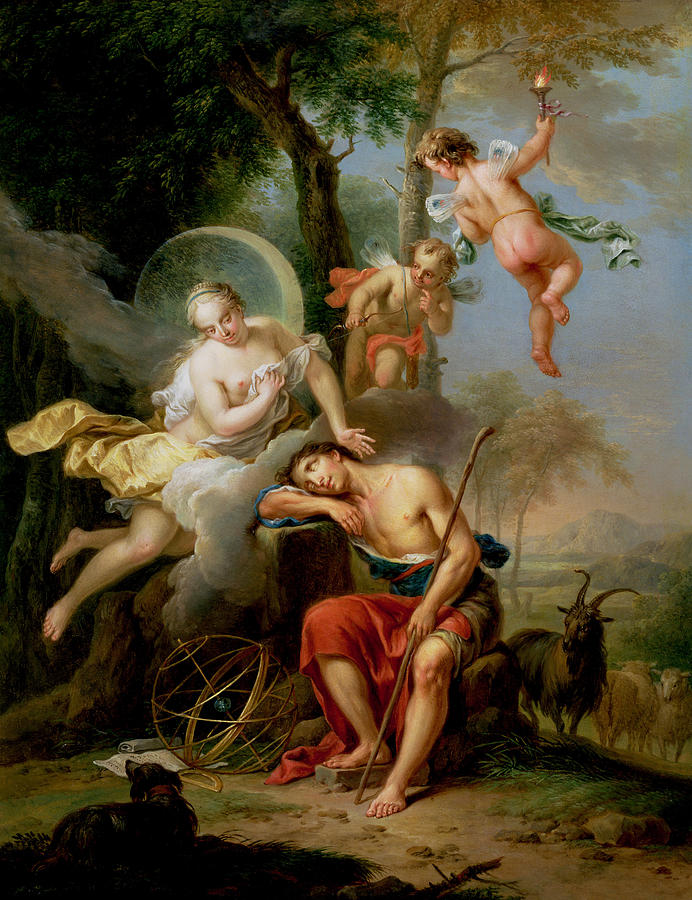
Diana and Endymion

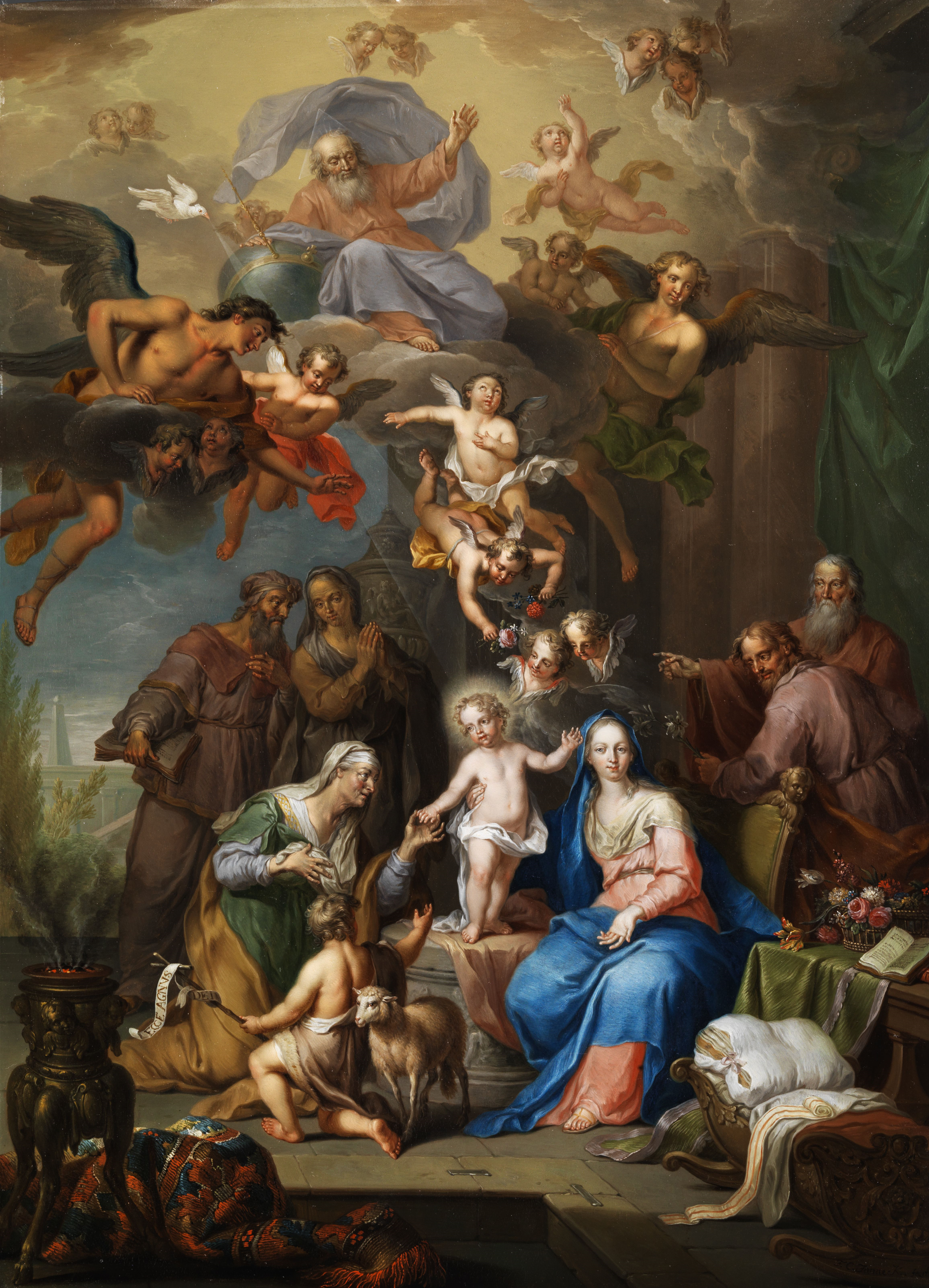
The Holy Family

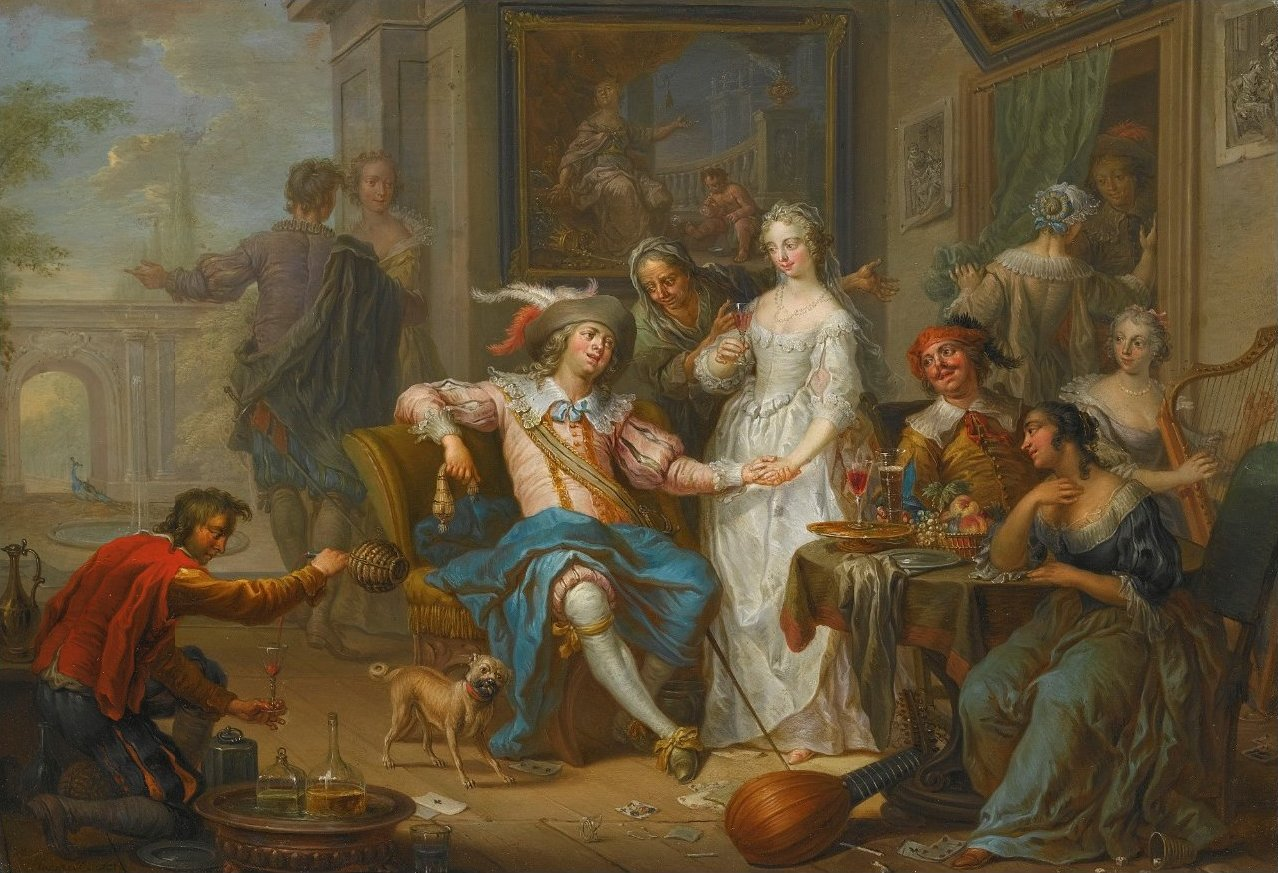
The Prodigal Son Spending his Money
in Riotous Living

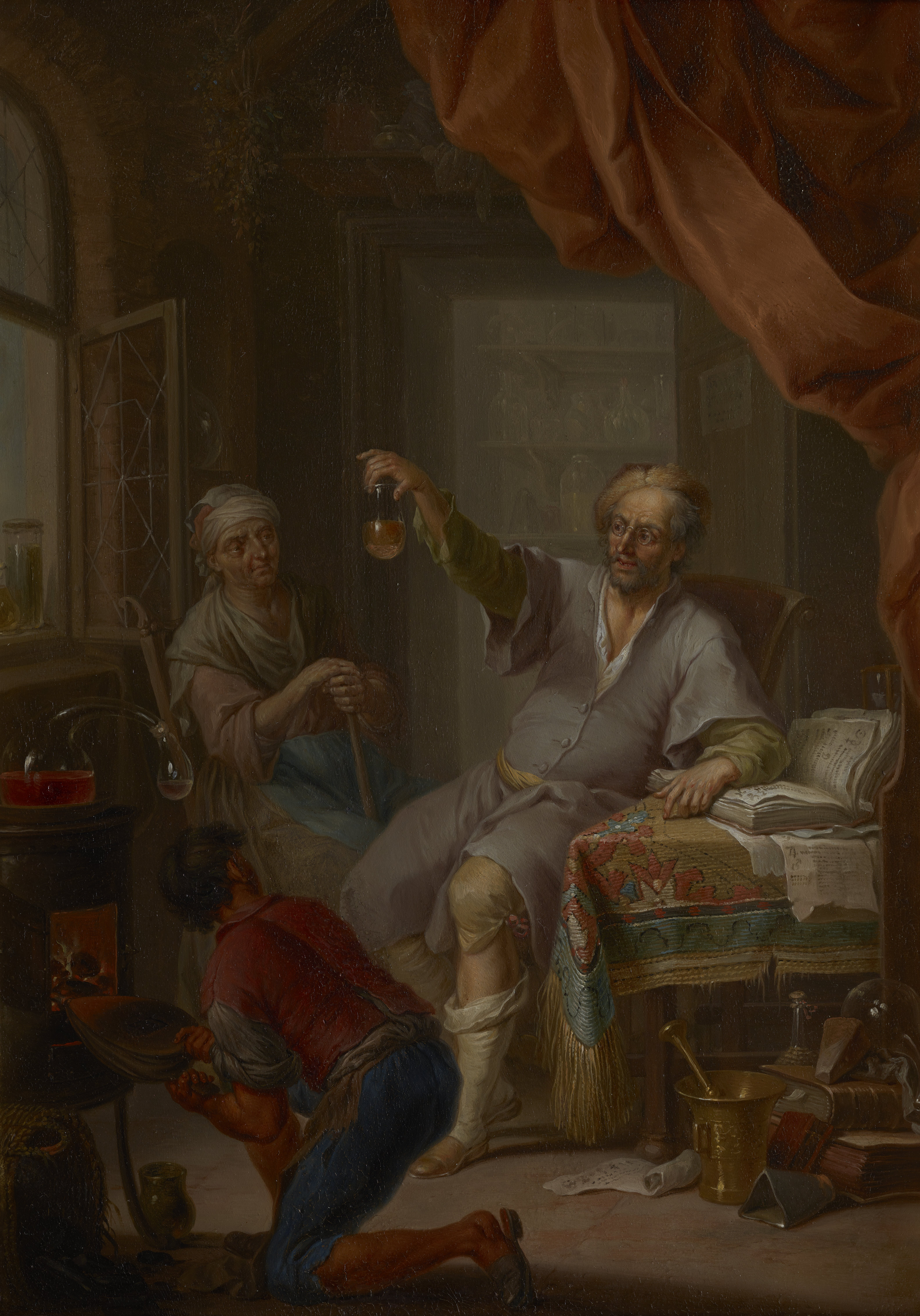
The Medical Alchemist
