= Francesco Civalli =

Italian painter (1660–1703)

Francesco Civalli (Perugia, 1660- January 7, 1703 in Rome) was an Italian painter of the Baroque, active in Perugia. He was the pupil of Andrea Carlone, but then trained with Giovanni Battista Gaulli in Rome. He frescoed ceilings in San Giorgio in Velabro in Rome. He also painted the portraits of Spinelli and Fuscaldo.
