= Nicholas Hewetson =

Irish Anglican priest

Nicholas Hewetson (12 July 1703 – 29 June 1761) was an 18th-century Anglican priest in Ireland.

Hewetson was born at Thomastown and educated at Trinity College, Dublin. He was Archdeacon of Killaloe from 1753 and Treasurer of Kilkenny Cathedral from 1758, holding both positions until his death.
