= Walter Pompe =

Flemish wood master-sculptor (1703–1777)

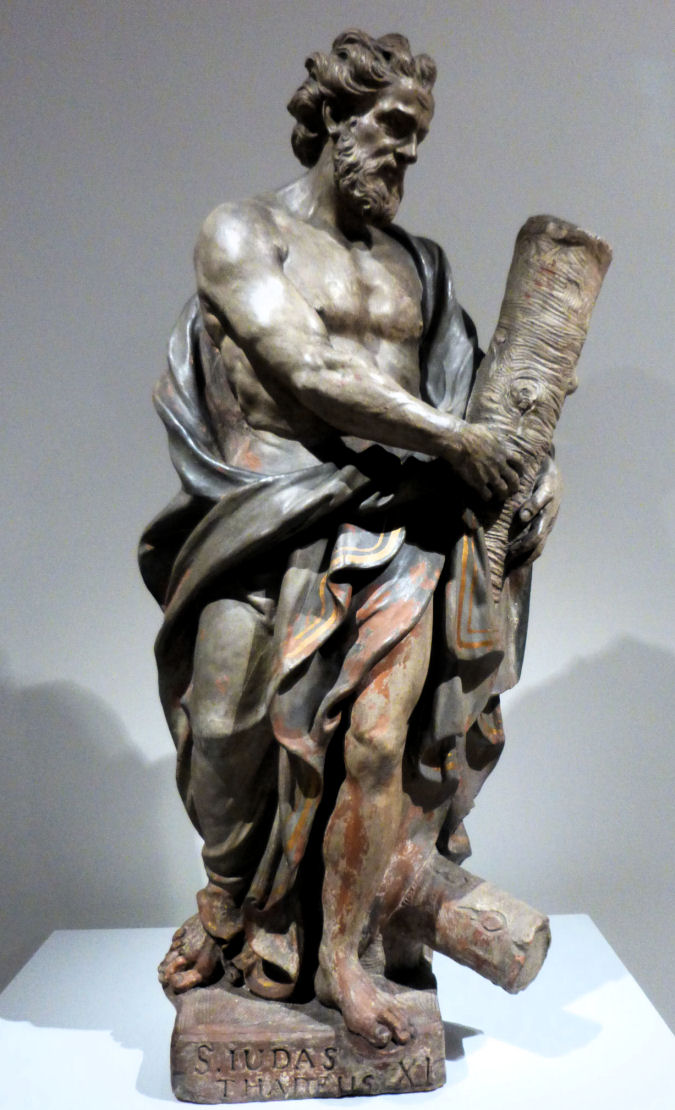
Holy apostle, collection museum of Cinquantenaire, Brussels

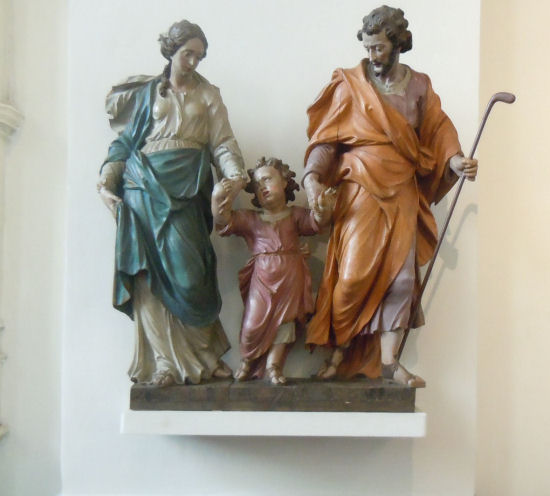
H. family in Church of Beveren-Waas

Walter Pompe (22 November 1703, Lith – 16 February 1777, Antwerp) was a Flemish master-sculptor, known for his religious works in wood.

Pompe is known for his fine wood sculpting. He was student of Michiel Van de Voort, from Antwerp. Often he designed baroque interiors for important churches.

== Works ==
- Turnhout, St-Peters
- Beveren, St-Martins group of H. Family
- Oostmalle
- Antwerpen,
- Antwerpen, Royal Museum of fine Arts
- Abbey of Tongerloo
