= René Lièvre de Besançon =

French people (1703 - 1739)

- Born: 20 / 05 / 1703 09:17 a.m. Versailles, Lat. 48° 48' 18" N; Long. 01° 07' 10" E
- Died: 17 / 04 / 1739; Paris
- Occupations: Member of the Court, Archer
- Parent: Duques Lièvre de Besançon

René Lièvre de Besançon (20 May 1703, Versailles– 17 April 1739, Paris), son of the Duques Lièvre de Besançon, was a young archer who stood out for his consecutive wins during the court of Louis XIV.

== Biography ==
René Lièvre de Besançon had beaten some of the best archers who passed through Versailles, at only 10 years old.

Having lived in Versailles until Louis XIV death, he moved to Paris with the whole court of young king Louis XV, with only 12 years old.

Using his extremely competitive nature, he manage to be an active member of the court.

Later on his life, René Lièvre embarked in a notorious gambling routine that would ultimately lead to his death.
