= Pierre Daubenton =

- Born: 10 April 1703; Montbard
- Died: 14 September 1776 (aged 73); Montbard
- Occupations: Lawyer; Writer
- Spouse: Bernarde Amyot

Pierre Daubenton (10 April 1703 – 14 September 1776) was an 18th-century French lawyer, politician, author and Encyclopédiste.

== Life ==
He was the son of Jean Daubenton (1669–1736) and Marie Pichenot (* ca. 1680). The naturalist Louis Jean-Marie Daubenton (1716–1800) was his brother. In his hometown Montbard he was first a lawyer at the local court, and later mayor, garrison commander, Lieutenant of Police and officer of the local army.

Very interested in natural history subjects, Pierre daubenton contributed the Encyclopédie by Diderot many articles on topics related to botany and zoology and also on agricultural issues.

On 22 October 1737, he married Bernarde Amyot who gave birth to a son, Georges Louis Daubenton (1739–1785).

== Bibliography ==
- Louise Lyle; David McCallam (Edit.): Histoires de La Terre: Earth Sciences and French Culture 1740–1940. Rodopi 2008, ISBN 90-420-2477-1, (p. 59)
