= Benoît-Joseph Boussu =

French violin maker (1703 - 1773)

- Born: 8 April 1703; Fourmirs, French Hainaut, France
- Died: September 1773 (aged 70); Avesnes-sur-Helpe, France
- Occupations: Violin maker, Notary
- Years active: c. 1749 – c. 1761 (violin making)
- Known for: 18th-century violin and cello craftsmanship; distinctive scroll design; instruments held in Brussels and Écouen collections

Benoît-Joseph Boussu (8 April 1703 – September 1773) was an 18th-century French violin maker.

== Violin maker ==
Boussu was active in the Brussels area during the middle of the eighteenth century (c. 1749 – c. 1761). His making method incorporated both local archaic as well as foreign influences. The Musical Instrument Museum (Brussels) has several Boussu violins and cellos in its collection; two of these instruments are in unaltered condition. Boussu's instruments feature a very remarkable scroll with an extra half turn and a yellow-brown varnish. The Musée national de la Renaissance collection includes a pochette by Boussu.

== Personal life ==
Boussu was baptized on 8 April 1703 in Fourmies, Nord, France, and for the first half of his working life he worked in Avesnes-sur-Helpe, France, as a notary, while his father and grandfather also were notaries. In his 40s, he and his family moved north, subsequently to Liège (c. 1749 – c. 1750), Etterbeek (c. 1751 – 1753) and Brussels (1753 – c. 1761), and at the same time he commenced a twelve-year period of intensive violin making. He abandoned his newly acquired profession, and in the 1760s moved again, possibly to the Amsterdam area, where three of his children married and subsequently lived, or otherwise directly back to his native area of France (Avesnes-sur-Helpe), where he died in September 1773.
