= Jean Philippe de Bela =

Jean-Philippe de Bela, known as chevalier de Bela, (3 February 1703 – 1796) OSL was a French-Basque military figure and writer in basque language, born at Mauléon, Soule. Among his works, he wrote L'histoire des basques and also Histoire générale de la nation basque, where he compares the Basque dialects from France with those of Guipúzcoa and Álava.

== Bela family ==
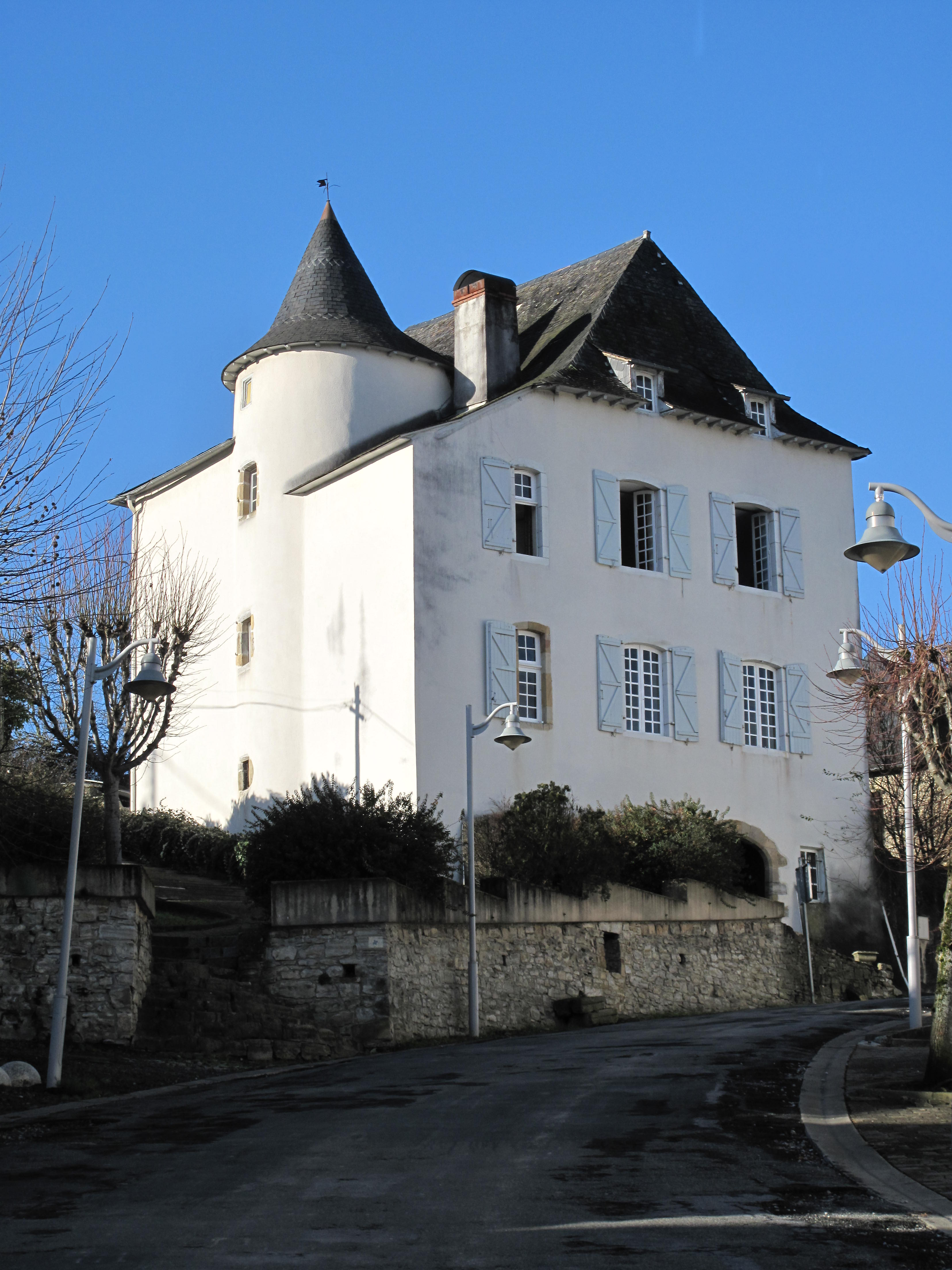
The Bela house, in Mauléon-Licharre

The first known reference to a member of this family from Soule is a text dating to the 15th century which mentions Garzia Belaz de Medrano, a noble from Navarre. His grandson, Gérard de Bela (1550–1633), was a bailiff and lieutenant general serving under Jean de Belzunce, Captain-châtelain and Governor of Soule. Apart from Bela, this family used derivative surnames such as Belaspect, Belapeyre, Belagrace, Bela-Chéraute and Belapéritz. Athanasius of Belapeyre, the son of the Protestant Jacques de Bela and among the family's more prominent members, became a Catholic priest and ascended to the office of vicar general. Among his properties were the mill of Asconéguy and the Planterose House in Mauléon. The mill still has the coat of arms of the family, dated 1767, on the lintel of its entrance.

== Life ==
At the age of 18, Bela moved to Grenoble in search of adventure, and joined the French army as an artilleryman. He soon reached the rank of cadet, but after a perceived slight by the captain of his regiment, Bela challenged him to a duel and was subsequently imprisoned, but he managed to escape and fled to Germany, where he joined the bodyguard of King Augustus III of Saxony. He then proceeded to Sweden. In this country he worked for their army as a Lieutenant and engineer. His love of drawing and mathematics led him to design fortifications of some importance. During the war of Polish succession, he was sent with the troops of a regiment of Dragoons and joined the defenders for Polish sovereignty. Being Captain of Dragoons he tried to defend the city of Dantzig, although he was made prisoner. Shortly after Bela managed to escape and retired to his homeland, having received a diploma of appreciation from the Polish King, naming him captain of his Royal Guard. Thanks to this feat, Bela was promoted to Lieutenant-Colonel of Dragoons and distinguished himself during the siege of Metz (1734). After a period in peace, he fought in Bohemia along the Marshal of France, and then also in Flanders and Germany. In 1745 as Lieutenant Colonel and when he had 36 years old, King Louis XV, assigned the formation of an army made up exclusively by Basques, which runs through the mountains and brings together a regiment of one thousand forty-six men, who are usually engaged in the conquest of mountainous terrain. His badge was a blue flag with the cross of St. Andrew in silver and the arms of the Kingdom of Navarre in the center., the famous "Volontaires Cantabres", in which Bela was Colonel. The Cantabre regiment was disbanded in 1749. Later Bela challenged to a duel to an individual who was accused of embezzlement of funds from this body. He had a trial before the Court marshals of France sentenced him to six months of imprisonment, while his accuser had to retract. For this reason, Bela left the military career and devoted himself to historical research, to write his military memoirs, to defend lawsuits, to play various public offices with special zeal, in short, to deploy a large activity. In 1748 he published his Exercices et Evolutions à l'usage du régiment Royal Cantabres. A man of great erudition as evidenced by the large number of manuscripts, titles, memories and much documentation which remain, as well as a history of the Basques from their origin to 1748, to which he dedicated 30 years of work, and it is divided into 12 books comprising the history of the seven Basque provinces more a dictionary of Basque dialects with the equivalent words in Hebrew, Greek, Celtic, armórico, Arabic, Latin gothic, Spanish and Italian. Bela encountered difficulties to print their work and was to deliver to the Benedictine Dom Sanadón - which would later be constitutional Bishop of the diocese. This extractó the work under the title Essai sur the noblesse des Basques, edited in Pau in 1785. Part of the manuscript of Bela was published by Clément Simon. Sanadon extract was translated into Spanish by Diego de Lazcano and published in Toulouse in 1786. Another translation was made by José Gironde, which released his version in 1858. The originals are in the National Library of Paris. Their military memoirs were published by Chaho in Ariel (1846) and by Duceré in 1896, with a biography of the author by j. of Jaurgain. Bring by his interest in the material progress of their fellow citizens, he translated into Basque works on Agriculture and economics, the quartermaster on duty refused to publish at the public expense. He also tried by various means obtain a small monopoly of wool knits for Mauleón, but their proposals were denied him by the Mayor; Workshop manufacture organized worked until four years before his death. Bela, as a member of the noble estate he was directly involved in the noble plot that led to the expulsion of members of the third estate in 1770. Later, in January 1774, acquired real rights over a large part of Zuberoa - Laruns, Mendibieu, Berrogain, Arrast, Larrory, Larrebieu, Moncayolle, Hôpital-Saint-Blaise, Sainte-Engrâce and Larrau-whose inhabitants ordered to recognize their manorial rights of hunting, rents, honours, etc., which succeeded for a couple of years until that alienation was overturned by the States. Come the revolution, Bela was stripped of more than half of his fortune, though it seems to be annoyed personally and not emigrated. His habit of greatness took him to invent a false pedigree, which was closely related with the nobles Belaz de Medrano, for whose descendants signed a testament on March 1, 1793.

== Bibliography ==
- James E. Jacob: Hills of conflict: Basque nationalism in France (1994)
