= André Levret =

French obstetrician (1703–1780)

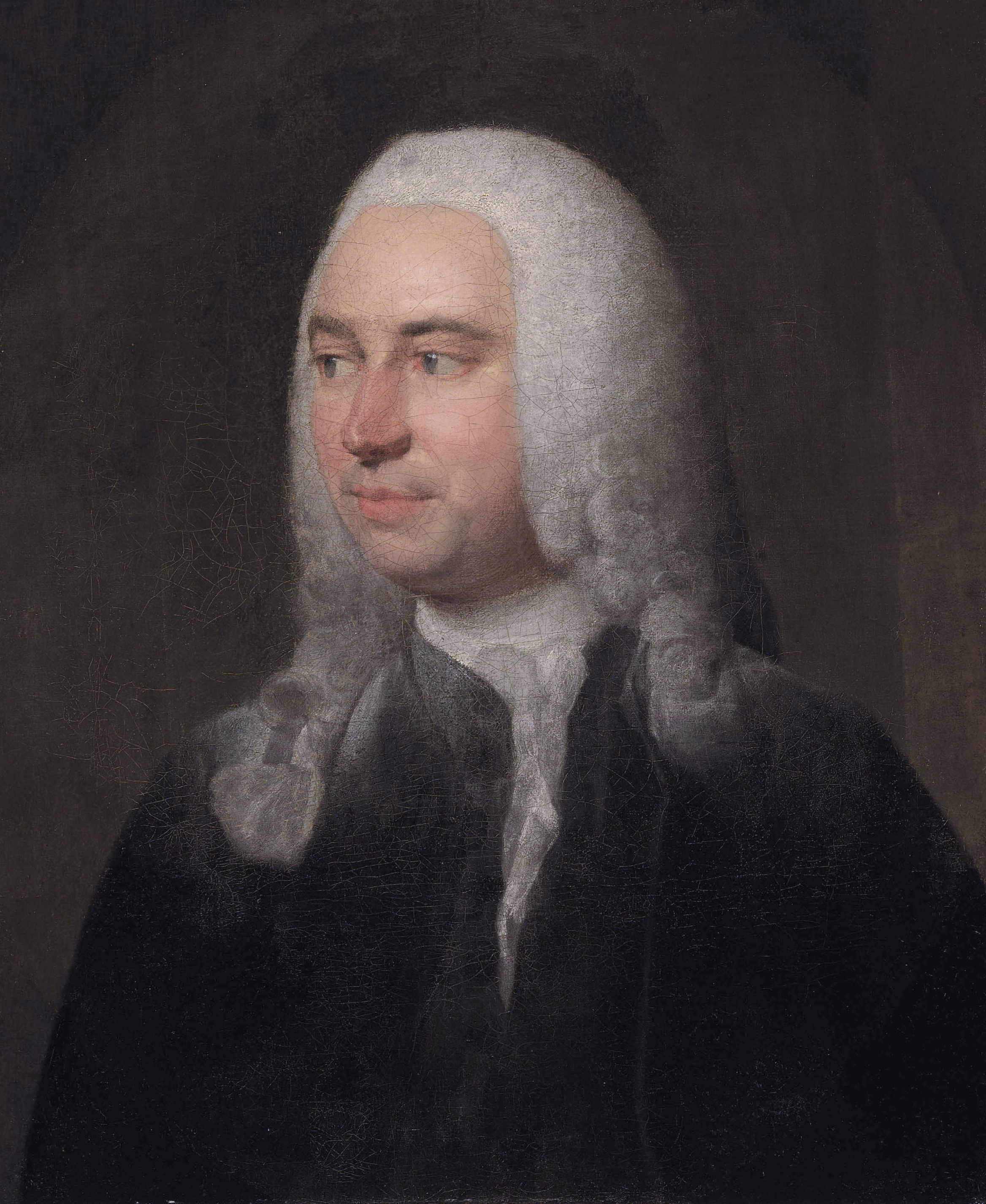
Andre Levret (1703–1780) (Jean-Siméon Chardin)

André Levret (8 January 1703 in Paris – 22 January 1780) was a French obstetrician who practised medicine in Paris. He was a contemporary of famed Scottish obstetrician William Smellie (1697–1763), and along with Jean-Louis Baudelocque (1745–1810), helped advance the science of obstetrics in 18th century France.

Levret is considered by many to be the most influential figure in 18th century French obstetrics. He is known for his work involving breech maneuvers and Caesarean sections. He wrote a number of influential books in the field of obstetrics and attracted students from all over Europe, among them German obstetrician Johann Lukas Boër (1751–1835). He is credited with improving the birth forceps by adding a "pelvic curve" to the instrument.

A classical procedure for assisted breech delivery is sometimes referred to as a "Mauriceau-Levret manipulation", named after Levret and physician François Mauriceau (1637–1709). This procedure is also known as "Lachapelle's manoeuvre", named after midwife Marie-Louise Lachapelle (1769–1821).

He was a member of the Académie Royale de Chirurgie.

== Principal works ==
- Observations sur les causes et les accidents de plusieurs accouchements laborieux, fourth edition, Paris, C. Osmont, 1747–1770. (translated into German)—Treatise on difficult deliveries.
- Observations sur la cure radicale de plusieurs polypes de la matrice, de la gorge, et du nez. 1749. third edition, revised and expanded, Paris, 1771—About a radical cure for polyps of the matrix, throat and nose.
- L’art des accouchements etc. Paris, Delaguette, 1753; 1761; 1766. (translated into German)—Treatise on birthing.
