= Daniel-Charles Trudaine =

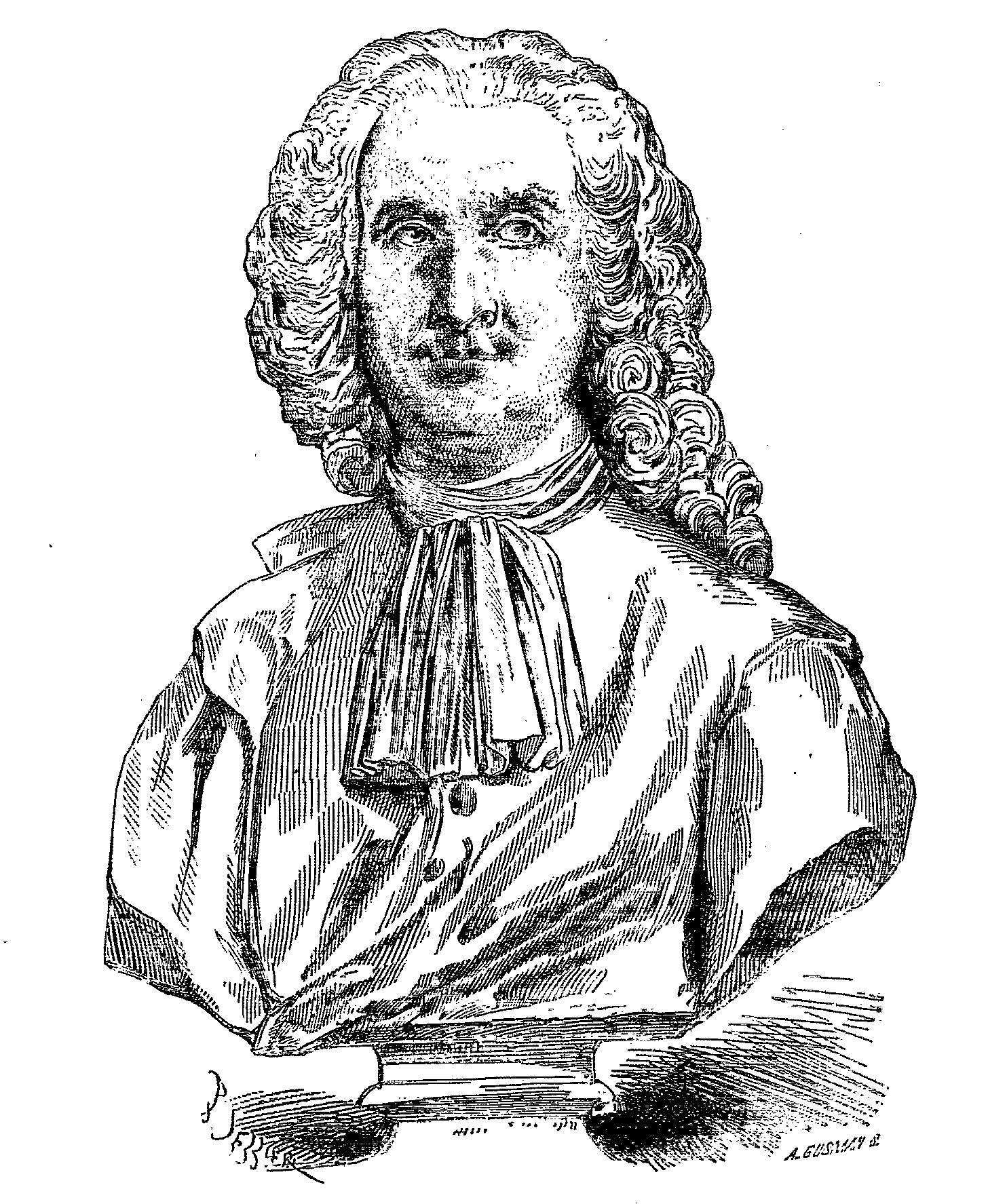
- Daniel-Charles Trudaine bust drawing in Le Magasin pittoresque, 1833
- Born: January 3, 1703; Paris, France
- Died: January 19, 1769 (aged 66); France
- Occupations: Administrator, civil engineer
- Parent: Charles Trudaine

Daniel-Charles Trudaine (French pronunciation: [danjɛl ʃaʁl tʁydɛn]; 3 January 1703 – 19 January 1769) was a French administrator and civil engineer. Trudaine was one of the primary developers of the present French road system.

He is also known for the monumental Atlas de Trudaine ("Trudaine Atlas", also known as "Trudaine Road Maps"), made under his direction.

== Life ==
Trudaine was born in Paris, the son of Charles Trudaine, prévôt des marchands de Paris (provost of the merchants of Paris). Daniel-Charles was a conseiller in the Parlement of Paris, then intendant of the Auvergne from 1730 to 1734. In 1743, he was named an honorary member of the Académie des sciences. In the following year, he was made director of the Assemblée des inspecteurs généraux des ponts et chaussées (Assembly of General Inspectors of Bridges and Roads), a title he held until his death. He founded the École nationale des ponts et chaussées (School of Civil Engineering) in 1747, with Jean-Rodolphe Perronet, engineer of the généralité of Alençon, as its head.

As head of civil engineering for the French state, Trudaine demonstrated his brilliance, creating several thousand kilometres of royal routes (now known as the "routes nationales") linking Paris to France's frontiers and main seaports. This network was one of the best designed in Europe, with routes built as straight as possible, laid out "de clocher à clocher" (from steeple to steeple), 60 feet (19.4 m) wide, bordered with trees and bound with ditches that were linked to rivers.

Trudaine was also responsible for the planning and construction of the Place Royale in Reims and other urban projects.

His son, Jean-Charles-Philibert Trudaine de Montigny, succeeded him in his official position.

== Atlas de Trudaine ==
The Trudaine Atlas, created from 1745 to 1780, was the most accurate set of cartographic plans of roads and topography of France made during its period. The scale of the maps show far more detail than is found on the famous maps made by César-François Cassini de Thury and family. The 62 bound volumes contain more than 3,000 plates prepared by the central bureau of draftsmen. Each one was artistically hand-rendered with watercolor to show the presence and characteristics of the land, waterways, and vegetation; castles, private dwellings, and ruins; churches, convents, and cemeteries; extant roads, as well as planned road projects. Map plates were augmented with designs for locks, bridges, and other civil engineering projects where future improvements were deemed necessary.

Trudaine did not live to complete his atlas for all of France; only the 22 regions governed by intendants were completed. (Maps in the atlas do not extend to Burgundy, Alsace, Provence, Languedoc, and Brittany or to regions recently conquered by Louis XIV, except for Metz – 3 map sets, and the Upper-Cambrésis (Cambrai region) – also 3 map sets.) However, more than half of France was covered by his work.

Trudaine's atlas is a well known achievement in the development of cartography.
