= Siege of Kehl (1703) =

Coordinates: 48.5713°N 7.8089°E

- Part of the War of the Spanish Succession
Date	20 February – 10 March 1703
Location	Kehl
Result	French victory

Belligerents
Kingdom of France	Holy Roman Empire (Imperial Army)

Commanders and leaders
Claude Louis Hector de Villars	Louis William, Margrave of Baden-Baden

Strength
	3,500

The 1703 siege of Kehl was a military action of the War of the Spanish Succession, in which French and Spanish forces under the command of the Duc de Villars captured the fortress of the Holy Roman Empire at Kehl, opposite Strasbourg on the Rhine River. Siege operations began on 20 February 1703, following Villars's early departure from winter quarters. The fortress, defended by 3,500 troops of Louis William, the Margrave of Baden-Baden, capitulated on 10 March.
