= Louise Levesque =

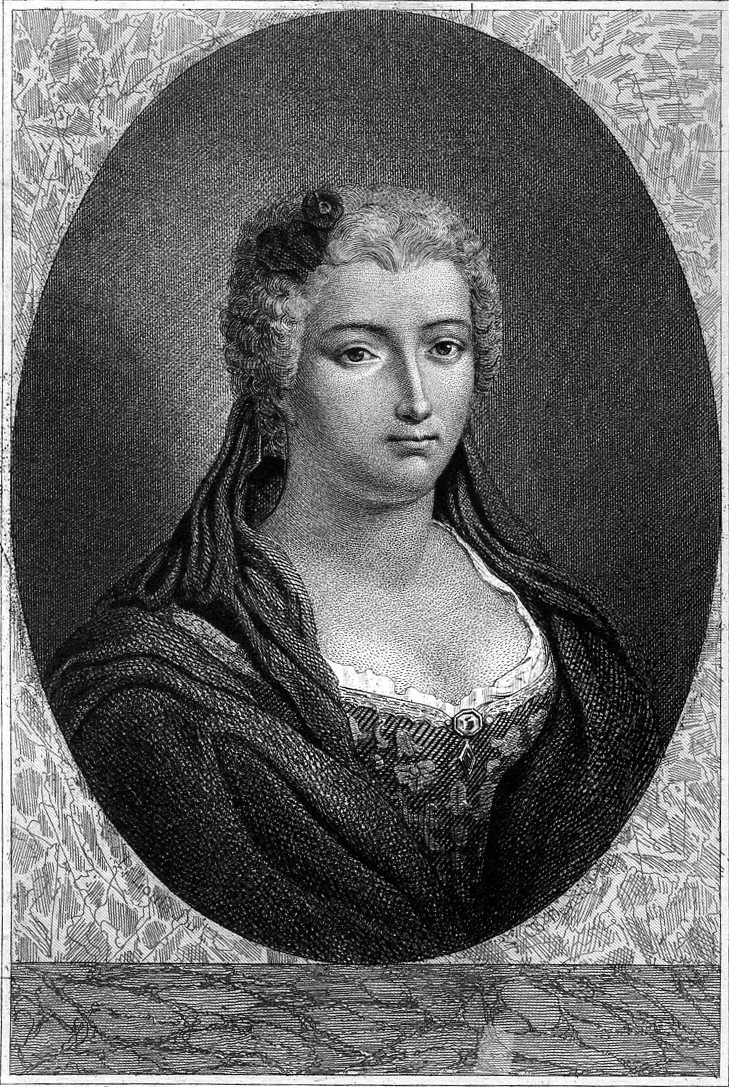
- Engraving by Charles Devrits
- Born: Louise Cavelier; 23 November 1703; Rouen, France
- Died: 18 May 1745 (aged 41); Paris, France
- Occupations: Playwright; Poet; Novelist

Louise Levesque, née Cavelier, (23 November 1703, Rouen – 18 May 1745, Paris) was an 18th-century French femme de lettres.

The daughter of a prosecutor at the parlement de Normandie, Louise Cavelier received a good education. At age 20, she married Levesque, a gendarme of the King whom she followed to Paris. Introduced to distinguished writers, these men of letters, of which she made her favorite company and who appreciated the scope of her mind, induced her to write. She therefore devoted her leisure reading and soon indulged herself to poetry. She tried her hand to most varied genres.

== Works ==
- 1731: Lettres et chansons de Céphise et d’Uranie, Paris, in-8°;
- 1733: Célénie, histoire allégorique, Paris, 4 part. in-12;
- 1736: Le Minet, pièce comique et facétieuse, Paris, in-12;
- 1736: Lélia, ou Histoire de Carthage, Amsterdam, in-12;
- 1736: Judith, five-act opera, Paris, non performed because no composer accepted to write the music.
- Remarques critiques sur l’histoire de Don Quichotte;
- L’Augustin, pièce grave et plusieurs pièces de vers dans les Amusements du cœur et de l’esprit;
- 1736–1741: Le Siècle, ou les mémoires du Comte de Solinville, moral novel, La Haye, in-12;
- 1738: Sancho Pança, gouverneur, poème burlesque, Amsterdam, in-8°;
- 1740: L’Auteur fortuné, comedy, Paris;
- 1744: Le Prince des Aigues-Marines. Le Prince Invisible, contes, Paris, in-12;

== Sources ==
- Gabriel Lhéry, « Notice sur Louise Cavelier Levesque », Poètes normands, Éd. Louis-Henri Baratte, Paris, Amédée Bedelet, Martinon, Dutertre et Pilout, 1846.
- Pierre Larousse, Grand Dictionnaire universel du XIXe, vol. 10, Paris, Administration du grand Dictionnaire universel, (p. 445).
- Lévesque (Louise Cavelier, dame), in Biographie Universelle, Ancienne et Moderne... , vol. 24, Paris, 1819; copied in Théodore-Éloi Lebreton's Biographie Normande, vol. 12, Rouen, 1858, and Biographie Rouennaise, Rouen, 1865.
