= 1711 =

1711 in various calendars
- Gregorian calendar: 1711; MDCCXI
- Ab urbe condita: 2464
- Armenian calendar: 1160; ԹՎ ՌՃԿ
- Assyrian calendar: 6461
- Balinese saka calendar: 1632–1633
- Bengali calendar: 1117–1118
- Berber calendar: 2661
- British Regnal year: 9 Ann. 1 – 10 Ann. 1
- Buddhist calendar: 2255
- Burmese calendar: 1073
- Byzantine calendar: 7219–7220
- Chinese calendar: 庚寅年 (Metal Tiger); 4408 or 4201 — to — 辛卯年 (Metal Rabbit); 4409 or 4202
- Coptic calendar: 1427–1428
- Discordian calendar: 2877
- Ethiopian calendar: 1703–1704
- Hebrew calendar: 5471–5472
- Hindu calendars
- Vikram Samvat: 1767–1768
- Shaka Samvat: 1632–1633
- Kali Yuga: 4811–4812
- Holocene calendar: 11711
- Igbo calendar: 711–712
- Iranian calendar: 1089–1090
- Islamic calendar: 1122–1123
- Japanese calendar: Hōei 8 / Shōtoku 1 (正徳元年)
- Javanese calendar: 1634–1635
- Julian calendar: Gregorian minus 11 days
- Korean calendar: 4044
- Minguo calendar: 201 before ROC 民前201年
- Nanakshahi calendar: 243
- Thai solar calendar: 2253–2254
- Tibetan calendar: ལྕགས་ཕོ་སྟག་ལོ་ (male Iron-Tiger); 1837 or 1456 or 684 — to — ལྕགས་མོ་ཡོས་ལོ་ (female Iron-Hare); 1838 or 1457 or 685

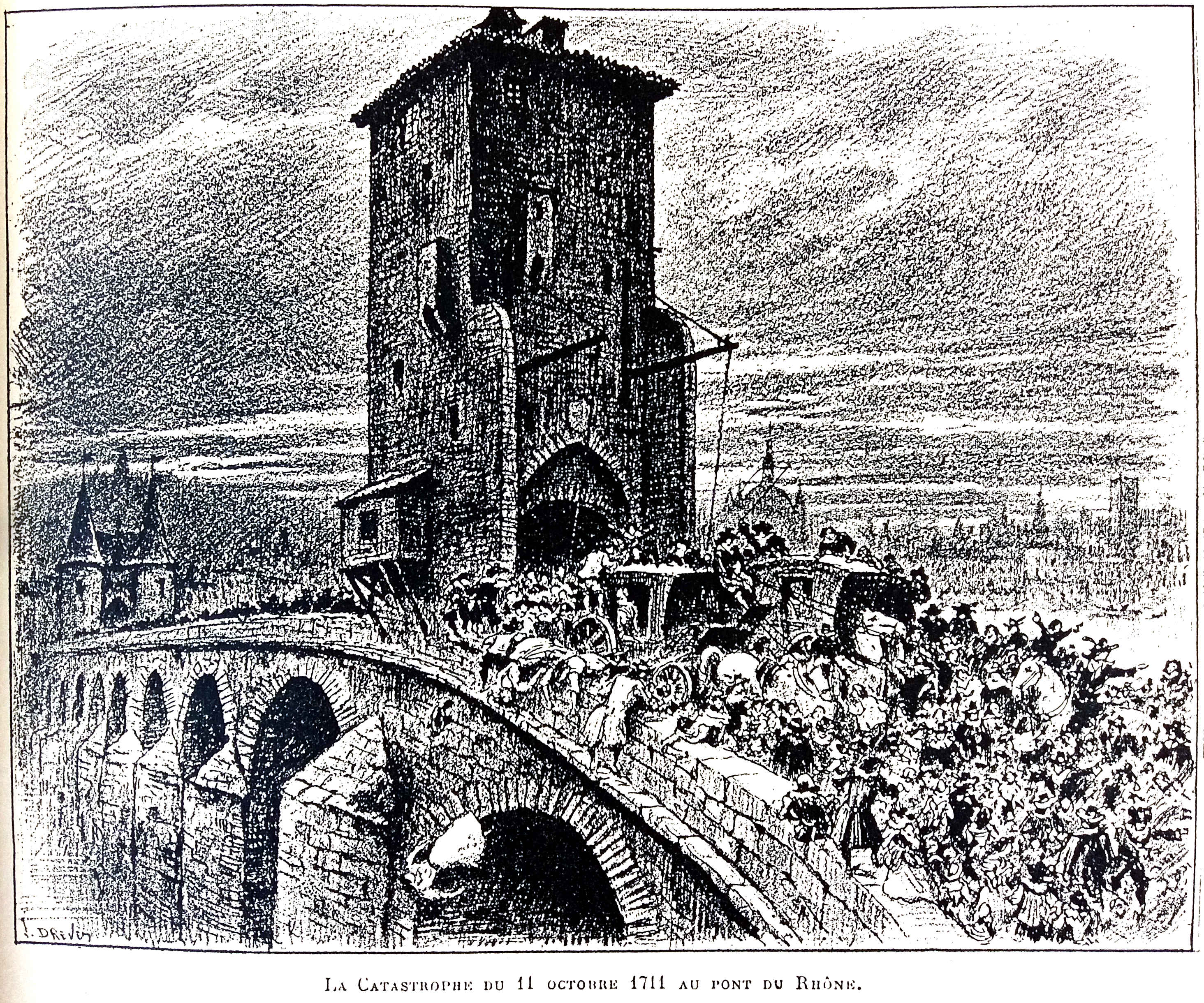
October 11: Panic kills 241 people on bridge in France

1711 (MDCCXI) was a common year starting on Thursday of the Gregorian calendar and a common year starting on Monday of the Julian calendar, the 1711th year of the Common Era (CE) and Anno Domini (AD) designations, the 711th year of the 2nd millennium, the 11th year of the 18th century, and the 2nd year of the 1710s decade. As of the start of 1711, the Gregorian calendar was 11 days ahead of the Julian calendar, which remained in localized use until 1923.

In the Swedish calendar it was a common year starting on Sunday, one day ahead of the Julian and ten days behind the Gregorian calendar.

== Events ==
=== January–March ===
- January – Cary's Rebellion: The Lords Proprietor appoint Edward Hyde to replace Thomas Cary, as the governor of the North Carolina portion of the Province of Carolina. Hyde's policies are deemed hostile to Quaker interests, leading former governor Cary and his Quaker allies to take up arms against the province.
- January 24 – The first performance of Francesco Gasparini's most famous opera Tamerlano takes place at the Teatro San Cassiano in Venice.
- February – French settlers at Fort Louis de la Mobile celebrate Mardi Gras in Mobile (Alabama), by parading a large papier-mache ox head on a cart (the first Mardi Gras parade in America).
- February 3 – A total lunar eclipse occurs, at 12:31 UT.
- February 24
  - Thomas Cary, after declaring himself Governor of North Carolina, sails an armed brigantine up the Chowan River, to attack Governor Hyde's forces fortified at Colonel Thomas Pollock's plantation. The attack fails, and Cary's forces retreat.
  - Rinaldo by George Frideric Handel, the first Italian opera written for the London stage, premieres at the Queen's Theatre, Haymarket.
- March 1 – The Spectator is founded by Joseph Addison and Richard Steele in London.

=== April–June ===
- April 3 – Clipperton Island is rediscovered by Frenchmen Martin de Chassiron and Michel Du Bocage, who draws up the first map and claims the island for France. The island had been discovered by Alvaro Saavedra Cedrón in 1528.
- April 5 (Easter Sunday) – The central tower of Elgin Cathedral in northeast Scotland collapses.
- April 13 – The Treaty of the Lutsk, a secret agreement between the Tsardom of Russia and the Ottoman Protectorate of Moldavia is signed in Lutsk, Poland-Lithuania (modern-day Ukraine).
- April 17 – Joseph I, Holy Roman Emperor dies, opening the way for the succession of his brother Charles VI. This complicates the ongoing War of the Spanish Succession as Charles is one of the two candidates for the Spanish throne, backed by the Grand Alliance.
- April 29 – A rabid wolf fatally injures two shepherds in Roncà, North Italy; it also attacks livestock.
- May – Alexander Pope publishes the poem An Essay on Criticism in London.
- May 25 – In Denmark, Helsingør is put under military blockade to prevent an outbreak of plague from spreading to Copenhagen; this year about one third of Helsingør's population is killed by the disease.
- June 18 – King Louis XIV becomes the longest-reigning monarch in the world, surpassing the previous record of 68 years set by Kʼinich Janaabʼ Pakal in 683. As of 2022, Louis XIV still holds this record.

=== July–September ===
- July 2 – Cary's Rebellion: Lieutenant Governor Alexander Spotswood of Virginia dispatches a company of Royal Marines to assist Governor Hyde. After hearing of this, Cary's troops abandon all of their fortifications along the Pamlico River. Cary and many of his supporters are soon caught and sent to England as prisoners, ending Cary's Rebellion.
- July 11 – The town of São Paulo, Brazil, is elevated to city status.
- July 21 – The Treaty of the Pruth is signed between the Ottoman Empire and Russia, ending the Pruth River Campaign.
- July 29 – Total lunar eclipse at 17:50 UT.
- August 1 – The Dutch East India Company trading ship Zuytdorp leaves the Netherlands on an ill-fated voyage to Indonesia bearing a load of freshly minted silver coins. The wreck site remains unknown until the mid-20th century, on a remote part of the Western Australian coast between Kalbarri and Shark Bay.
- August 7 – Capture of the galleon San Joaquin: Spanish galleon San Joaquin in a treasure fleet sailing from Cartagena de Indias (modern-day Colombia) to Spain surrenders after an engagement with five British ships.
- August 9 – John Churchill, 1st Duke of Marlborough with an army of 30,000 besieges Bouchain in the War of the Spanish Succession. The siege lasts 34 days and results in the last major victory for Churchill.
- August 11 – The first horse race is held at the newly founded Ascot Racecourse, which becomes one of the leading racecourses in England.
- August 13 – Tamachi Raisinhji becomes Jam Sahib (ruling prince) of Nawanagar State in Gujarat, India.
- August 14 – The inauguration of the newly built Cathedral of the Assumption takes place in Gozo, Malta.
- August 22 – The Quebec Expedition, a British attempt to attack Quebec as part of Queen Anne's War, fails when 8 of its ships are wrecked in the Saint Lawrence River and 890 people, mostly soldiers, drown.
- September 8 – The South Sea Company receives a Royal Charter in Britain.
- September 10 (also dated September 12) – John Lawson, Christoph von Graffenried, two African American slaves and two Native Americans leave on an exploration expedition from New Bern, North Carolina, and travel north by canoe up the Neuse River.
- September 14 (approximate date) – Tuscarora natives capture John Lawson, Christoph von Graffenried and their expeditionary party, and bring them to Catechna.
- September 16 (approximate date) – Tuscarora natives kill Lawson. Von Graffenried and one African American slave are known to have been set free.
- September 18 – Bishop Bogusław Gosiewski sells the town of Maladzyechna in the Minsk Region of Belarus to the mighty Ogiński family.
- September 22 – The Tuscarora War begins when Tuscarora natives under the command of Chief Hancock raid settlements along the south bank of the Pamlico River, within the Province of Carolina (modern-day North Carolina), killing around 130 people.

=== October–December ===
- October 7 – HMS Feversham is wrecked on Scaterie Island, Nova Scotia with the loss of 102 lives.
- October 11 – Panic kills 241 people in the stampede on the Guillottière bridge in France near Lyon. Revelers returning from a festival on the other side of the Rhône river are blocked from crossing after a collision between a carriage and a cart. At least 25 fall off the bridge and into the river, while 216 are trampled by people behind them.
- October 14
  - Yostos kills Tewoflos, becoming Emperor of Ethiopia.
  - Woodes Rogers returns to England after a successful round-the-world privateering cruise against Spain, carrying loot worth £150,000.
- October 16 – Académie Royale des Beaux-Arts is established in Brussels.
- November 5 – The southwest spire of Southwell Minster in Nottinghamshire, England is struck by lightning, resulting in a fire that spreads to the nave and tower, destroying roofs, bells, clock and organ.
- November 7 – The Dutch East India Company ship Liefde runs aground and sinks off Out Skerries, Shetland, with the loss of all but one of her 300 crew.
- December 5 – Great Northern War: the Battle of Wismar results in a Danish victory over Swedish forces.
- December 7 – In the Parliament of Great Britain the Earl of Nottingham successfully proposes a "No Peace Without Spain" amendment.
- December 8 – The Immaculate Conception Cathedral, Comayagua in Honduras, one of the oldest cathedrals in Central America, is inaugurated.
- December 12 – A constitution is approved for the Academy of Sciences of the Institute of Bologna, which had been founded in 1690.
- December 13 – Wall Street in New York City becomes the city's first official slave market for the sale and rental of enslaved Africans and Indians.
- December 15 – The Old Pummerin, a massive bell cast from 208 captured cannons, is consecrated by Bishop Franz Ferdinand Freiherr von Rummel in preparation for its installation in St. Stephen's Cathedral, Vienna (the Stephansdom).
- December 25 – The rebuilding of St Paul's Cathedral in London to a design by Sir Christopher Wren is declared complete by Parliament; Old St Paul's had been destroyed by the 1666 Great Fire of London.

=== Date unknown ===
- John Shore invents the tuning fork.
- Luigi Ferdinando Marsili shows that coral is an animal rather than a plant as previously thought.

== Births ==
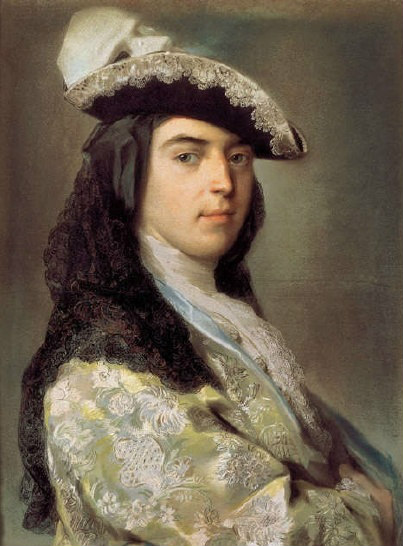
Charles Sackville, 2nd Duke of Dorset born 6 February

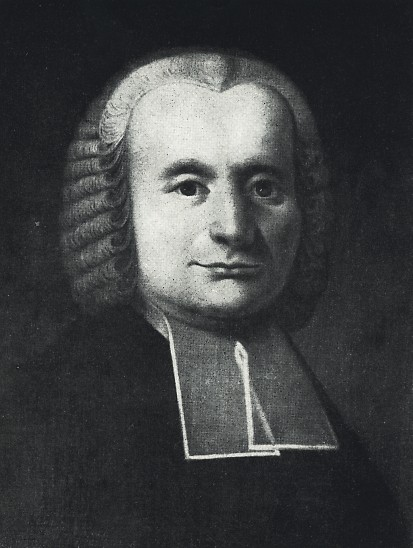
Samuel Gotthold Lange born 22 March

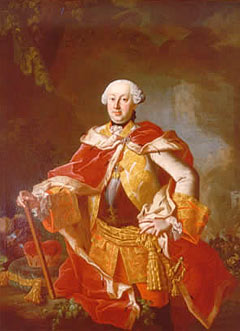
Paul II Anton, Prince Esterházy born 22 April

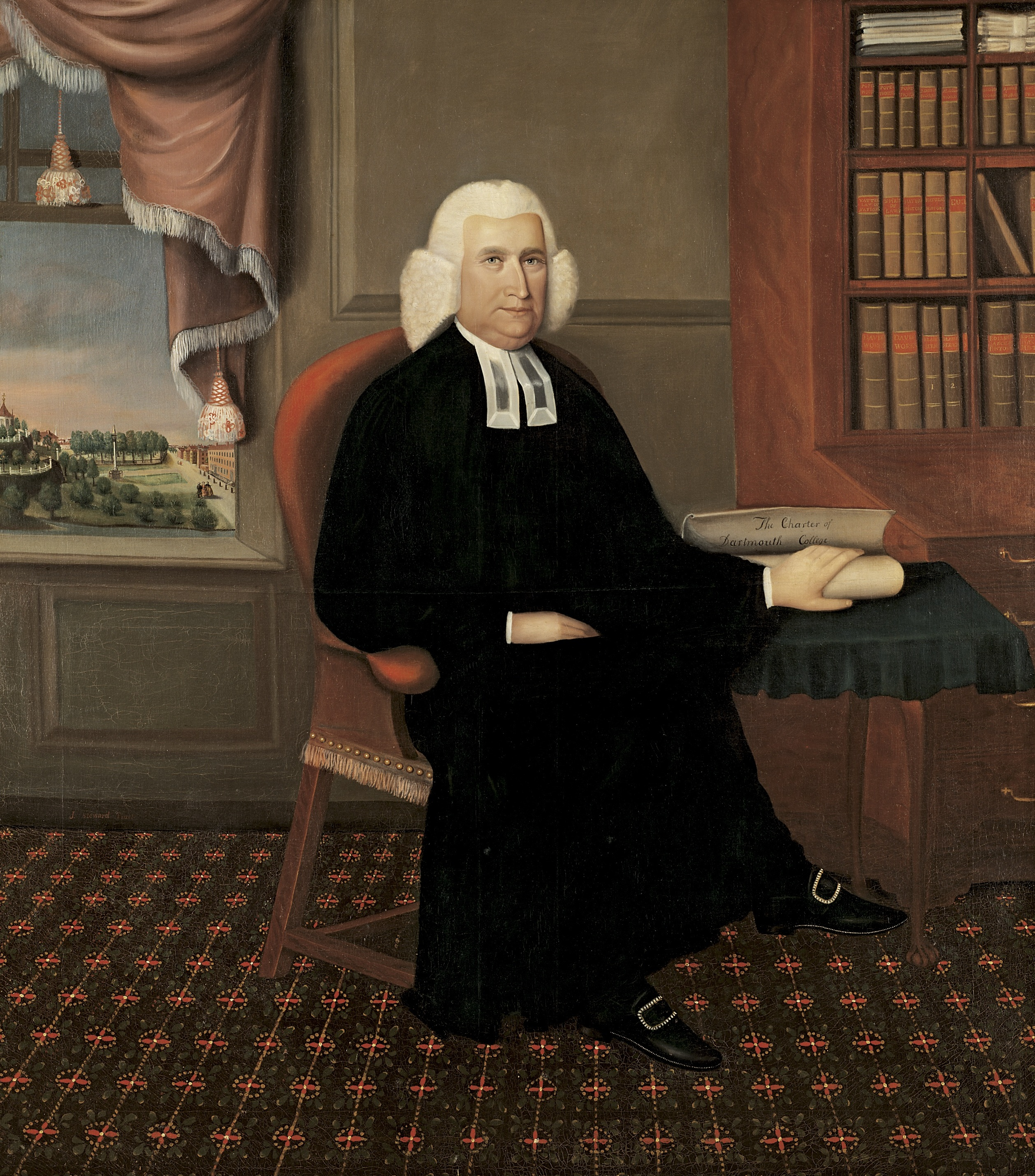
Eleazar Wheelock born 22 April

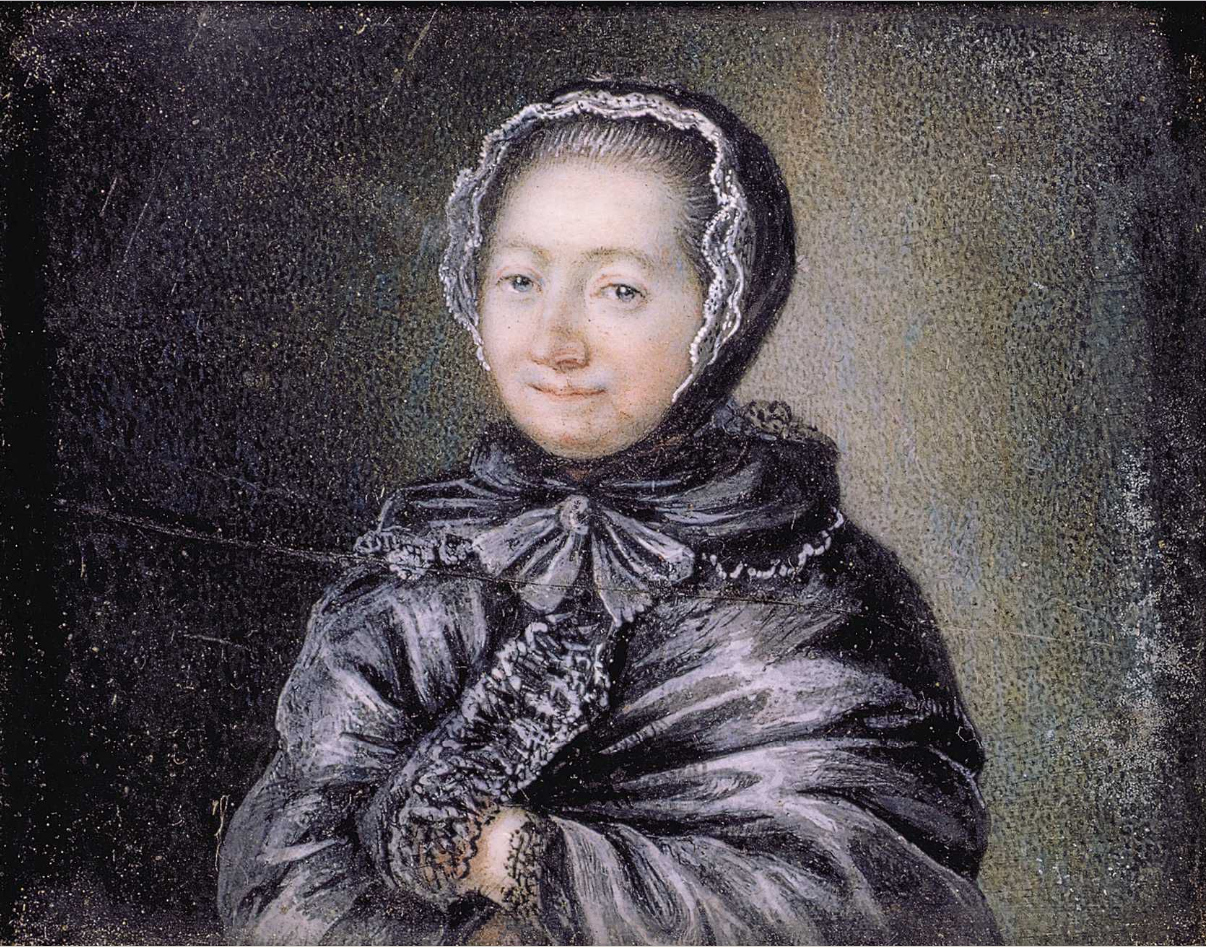
Jeanne-Marie Leprince de Beaumont born 26 April

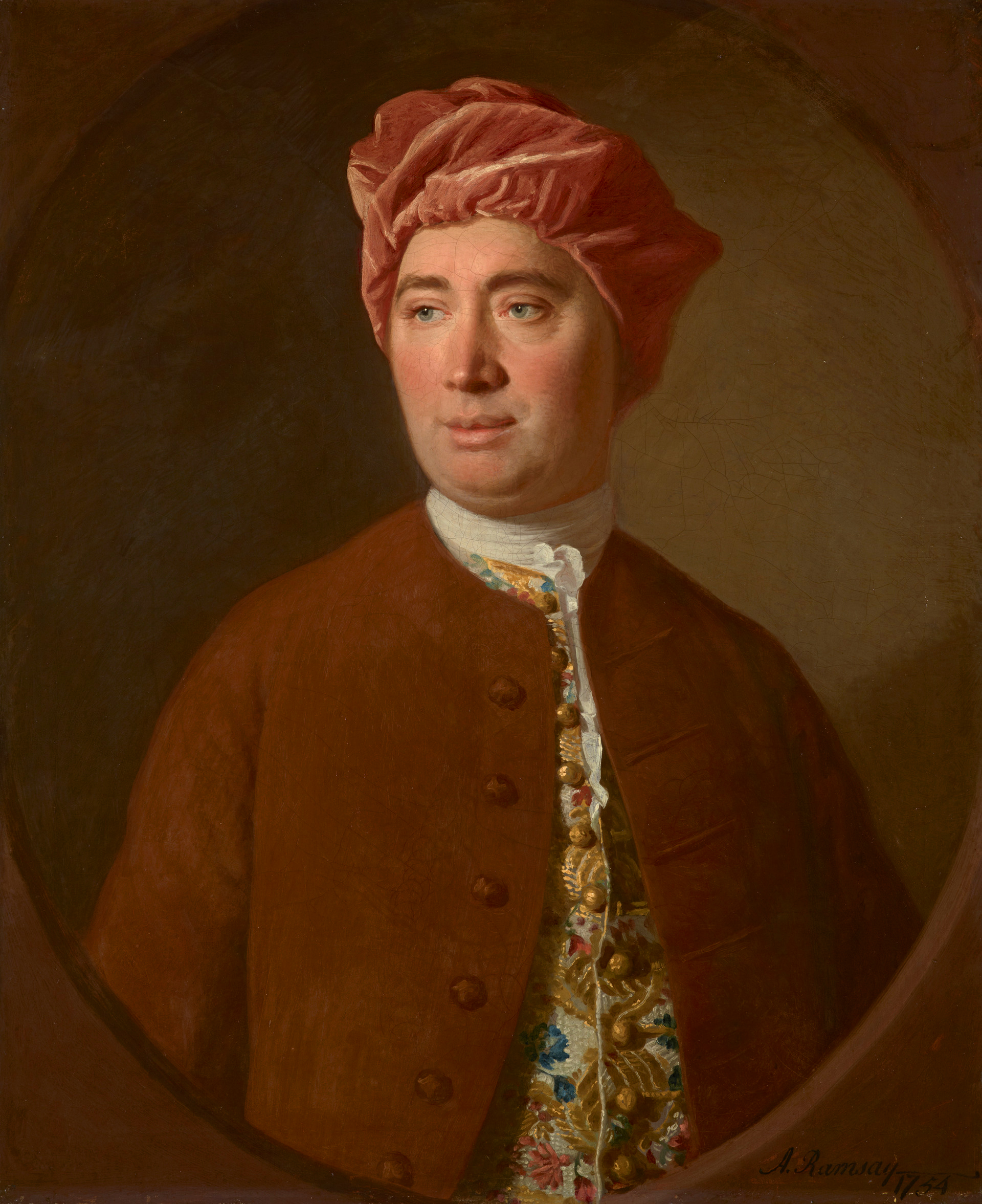
David Hume born 26 April

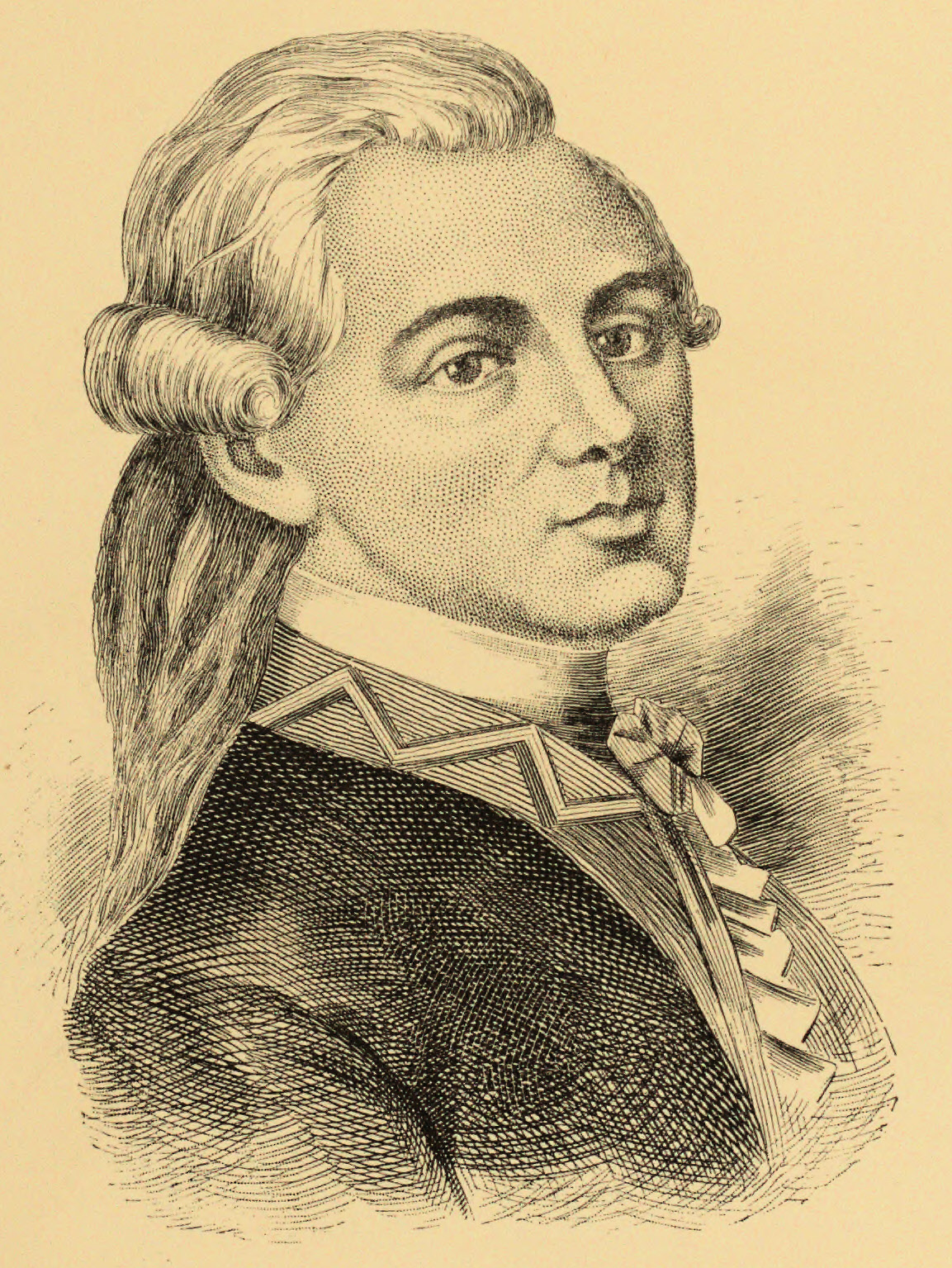
Daniel Liénard de Beaujeu born 19 August

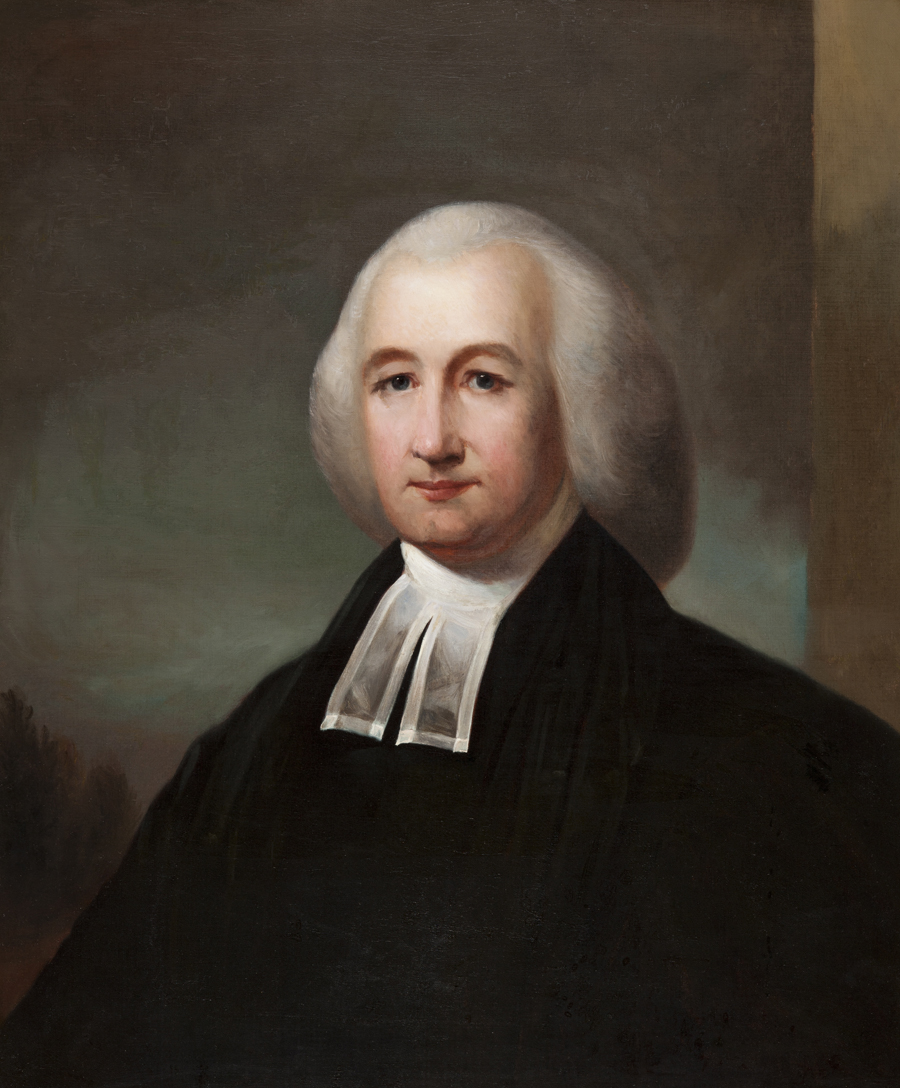
Henry Muhlenberg born 6 September

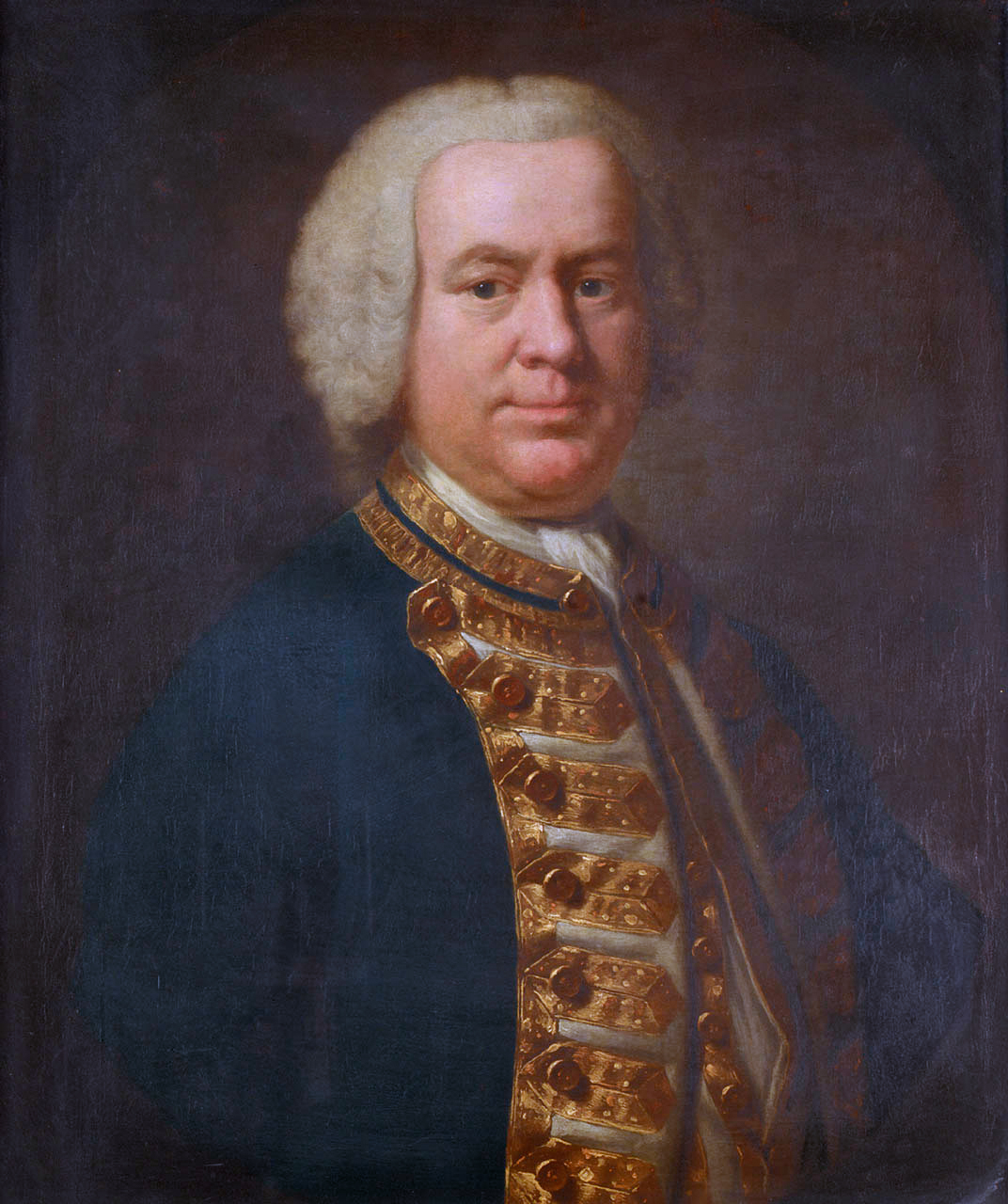
Charles Holmes (Royal Navy officer) born 19 September

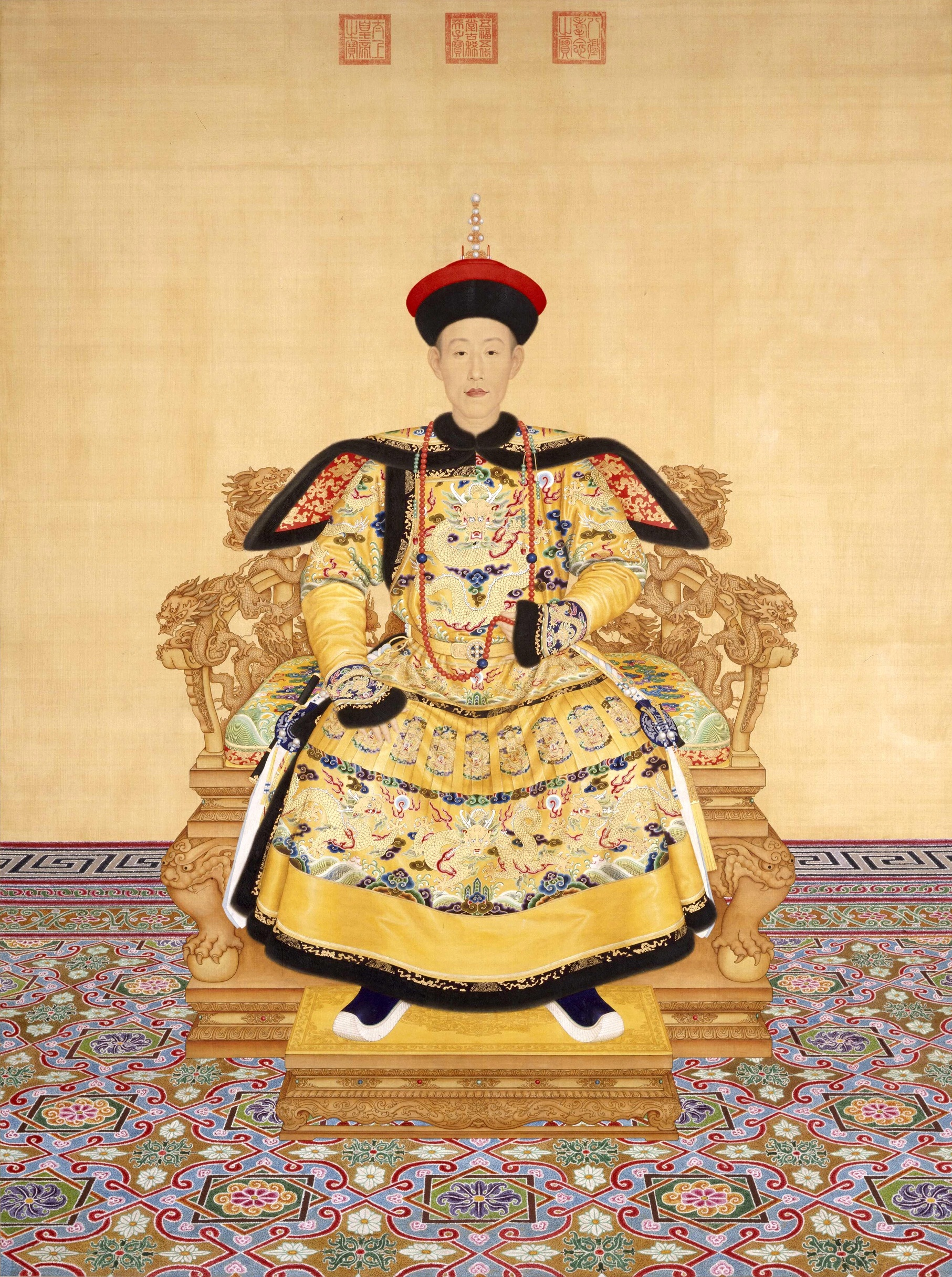
Qianlong Emperor born 25 September

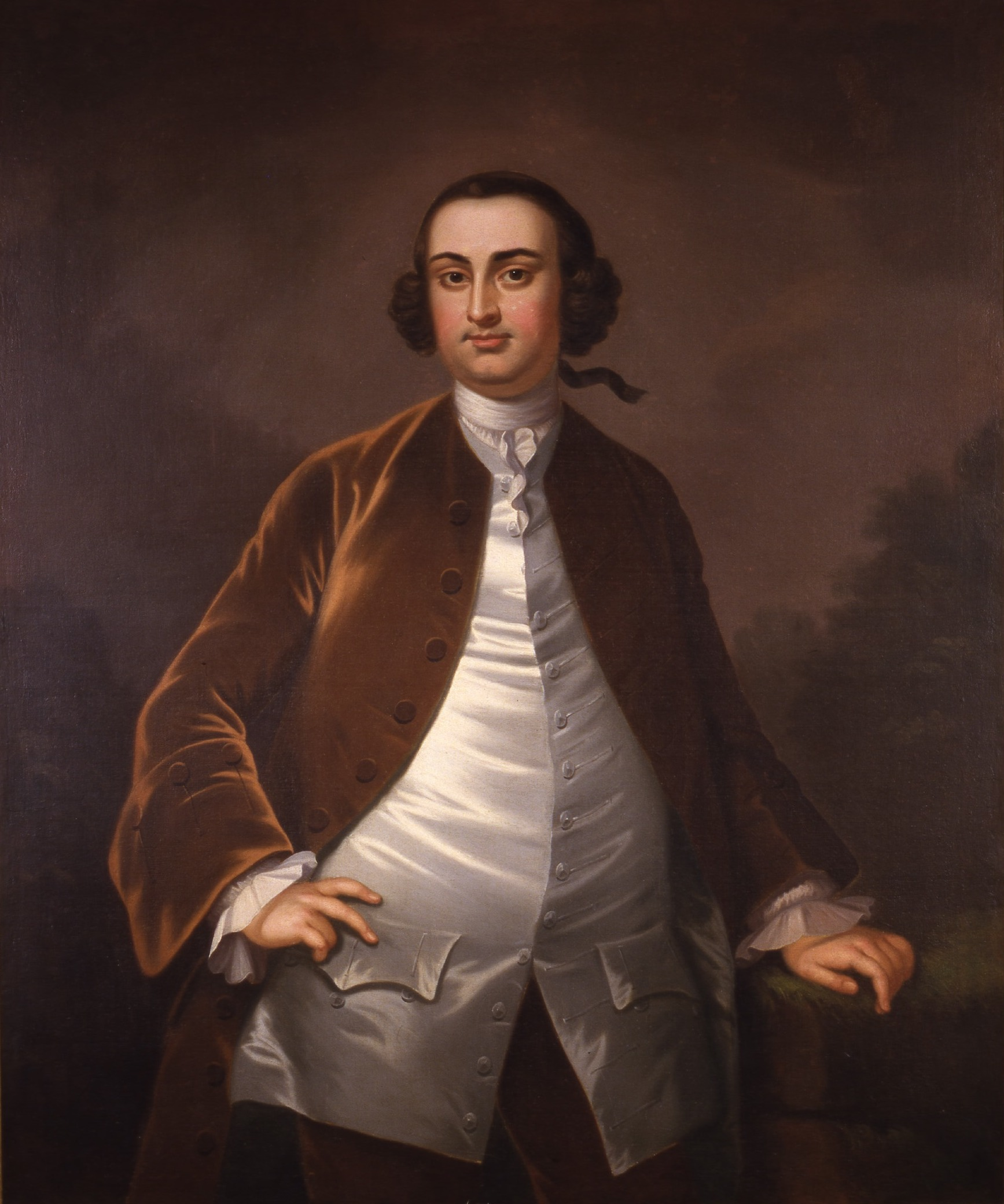
Daniel Parke Custis born 15 October

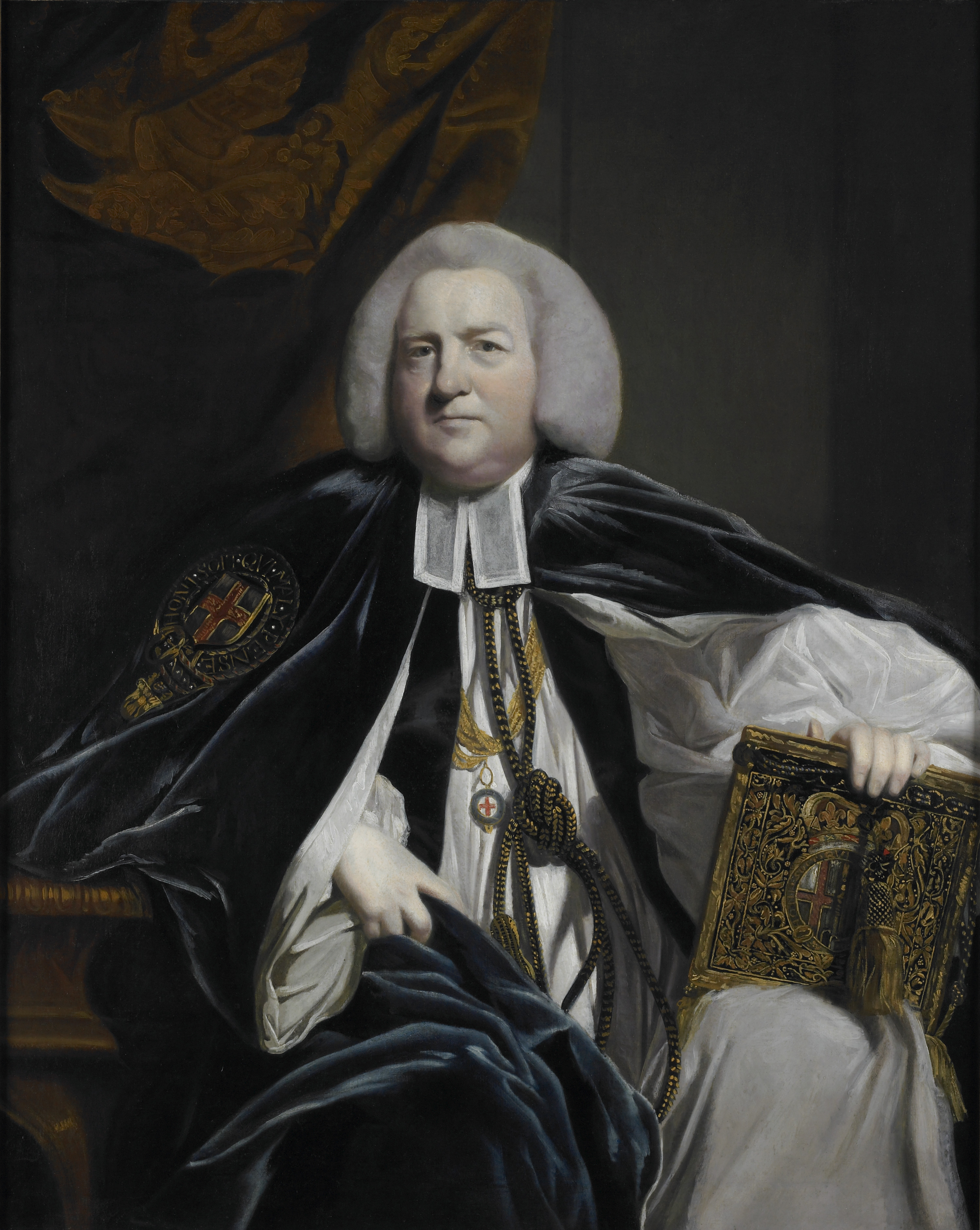
Robert Hay Drummond born 10 November

=== January–March ===
- January 1 – Baron Franz von der Trenck, Austrian noble (d. 1749)
- January 3
  - Charles Moss, British bishop of Bath and Wells (d. 1802)
  - Giuseppe Capece Zurlo, Italian cardinal who served as Archbishop of Naples (d. 1801)
- January 12 – Gaetano Latilla, Italian opera composer (d. 1788)
- January 15 – Sidonia Hedwig Zäunemann, German poet (d. 1740)
- January 22 – Johann Phillip Fabricius, German missionary (d. 1791)
- January 28 – Johan Hörner, Swedish-born Danish portrait painter (d. 1763)
- January 29 – Giuseppe Bonno, Austrian composer (d. 1788)
- January 30 – Abraham Roentgen, German Ébéniste (cabinetmaker) (d. 1793)
- February 2 – Wenzel Anton, Prince of Kaunitz-Rietberg, Austrian diplomat and chancellor (d. 1794)
- February 3 – Omar Ali Saifuddin I, Sultan of Brunei (d. 1795)
- February 4 – Józef Aleksander Jabłonowski, Polish prince (d. 1777)
- February 5 – Joseph Umstatt, Austrian composer of the early Classical era (d. 1762)
- February 6 – Charles Sackville, 2nd Duke of Dorset, English cricketer (d. 1769)
- February 9
  - Anthony Ashley Cooper, 4th Earl of Shaftesbury, England (d. 1771)
  - Luis Vicente de Velasco, Spanish officer and commander in the Royal Spanish Navy (d. 1762)
- February 10 – John Plumptre, British politician (d. 1791)
- February 13 – Domènec Terradellas, Spanish opera composer (d. 1751)
- February 14 – Alexandra Kurakina, daughter of Lieutenant-General and Senator Ivan Panin (d. 1786)
- February 23 – Louis de Brienne de Conflans d'Armentières, French general (d. 1774)
- February 25
  - Tokugawa Gorōta, Japanese daimyō (d. 1713)
  - John Perceval, 2nd Earl of Egmont, British politician with Irish connections (d. 1770)
- February 27
  - Gerrit de Graeff, member of the De Graeff family from the Dutch Golden Age (d. 1752)
  - Constantine Mavrocordatos, Prince of Wallachia and Moldavia (d. 1769)
- March 4 – Matthäus Stach, Moravian missionary in Greenland (d. 1787)
- March 5 – Carl Gustaf Pilo, Swedish-born artist and painter (d. 1793)
- March 11 – Joseph Leeson, 1st Earl of Milltown, Irish peer and politician (d. 1783)
- March 22 – Samuel Gotthold Lange, German poet (d. 1781)
- March 24 – William Brownrigg, doctor and scientist (d. 1800)

=== April–June ===
- April 2 – Job Baster, Dutch naturalist (d. 1775)
- April 3 – Hartwig Karl von Wartenberg, Royal Prussian major general (d. 1757)
- April 10 – John Gambold, British bishop (d. 1771)
- April 13 – John Mitchell, colonial American physician and botanist (d. 1768)
- April 14 – Lord John Murray, British general and politician (d. 1787)
- April 22
  - Paul II Anton, Prince Esterházy (d. 1762)
  - Eleazar Wheelock, American President of Dartmouth College (d. 1779)
- April 26
  - Jeanne-Marie Leprince de Beaumont, French writer (d. 1780)
  - David Hume, Scottish philosopher, economist, and historian (d. 1776)
- May 1 – Richard Clarke, Massachusetts merchant (d. 1795)
- May 7 – Johann Friedrich Gräfe, German civil servant and an amateur composer (d. 1787)
- May 9 – Sir Mark Sykes, 1st Baronet, priest in the Church of England (d. 1783)
- May 10 – Frederick, Margrave of Brandenburg-Bayreuth, member of the House of Hohenzollern (d. 1763)
- May 12 – Abraham Darby II, English ironmaster (d. 1763)
- May 17 – Agustín de Jáuregui, Spanish colonial governor (d. 1784)
- May 18 – Roger Joseph Boscovich, Croatian-Italian priest and mathematician (d. 1787)
- May 22 – Guillaume du Tillot, French politician (d. 1774)
- May 23 – Ulla Tessin, Swedish courtier (d. 1768)
- May 31 – Johann Heinrich Samuel Formey, German writer (d. 1797)
- June 6 – Jean-Baptiste Coye, Occitan language writer (d. 1771)
- June 7 – François Jacquier, French Franciscan mathematician and physicist (d. 1788)
- June 8 – Charles Morris, Canadian judge (d. 1781)
- June 12 – Louis Legrand, French Sulpician priest and theologian (d. 1780)
- June 13 – Sir Richard Glyn, 1st Baronet, of Ewell, British banker and politician (d. 1773)
- June 16 – François-Louis de Pourroy de Lauberivière, fifth bishop of the diocese of Quebec (1739–1740) (d. 1740)
- June 19 – Jacob Bremer, Swedish merchant and industrialist (d. 1785)
- June 23 – Giovanni Battista Guadagnini, Italian luthier (d. 1786)

=== July–September ===
- July 10 – Princess Amelia of Great Britain, Second daughter of George II of Great Britain (d. 1786)
- July 11 – Anne Poulett, British politician (d. 1785)
- July 18 – John Olmius, 1st Baron Waltham, of Ireland (d. 1762)
- July 22 – Georg Wilhelm Richmann, German physicist (d. 1753)
- July 24 – Richard FitzWilliam, 6th Viscount FitzWilliam (d. 1776)
- July 26
  - Lorenz Christoph Mizler, German music historian, polymath (d. 1778)
  - Jacques Hardouin-Mansart de Sagonne, French architect (d. 1778)
- July 27 – Christian Ancher, Norwegian merchant (d. 1765)
- July 29 – Claude-Adrien Nonnotte, French writer (d. 1793)
- August 19
  - Daniel Liénard de Beaujeu, Canadian officer during King George's War and the Seven Years' War (d. 1755)
  - Edward Boscawen, British Royal Navy admiral (d. 1761)
  - Gabriel de Solages, French soldier and industrialist (d. 1799)
- August 21 – Bernardo de Hoyos, Beatified Spanish priest (d. 1735)
- September 1 – William IV, Prince of Orange, first hereditary stadtholder of the Netherlands (d. 1751)
- September 2 – Noël Hallé, French painter (d. 1781)
- September 5 – Johann Nathanael Lieberkühn, German physician (d. 1756)
- September 6 – Henry Muhlenberg, Lutheran clergyman and missionary (d. 1787)
- September 8 – Flavio Chigi, Italian Catholic cardinal (d. 1771)
- September 9 – Thomas Hutchinson, historian and last civilian Governor of the Province of Massachusetts Bay (d. 1780)
- September 11 – Alexandre Guy Pingré, Catholic priest and scientist (d. 1796)
- September 14 – Michele Foschini, Italian painter (d. 1770)
- September 15 – Heinrich IX, Count Reuss of Köstritz, Count of Reuss-Köstritz and Minister of Prussia (d. 1780)
- September 17 – John Zephaniah Holwell, British surgeon (d. 1798)
- September 18 – Ignaz Holzbauer, composer of symphonies (d. 1783)
- September 19 – Charles Holmes, Rear admiral in the British Navy during the Seven Years' War (d. 1761)
- September 20
  - Ignazio Cirri, Italian organist and composer in the 18th century (d. 1787)
  - Frederick August I, Duke of Oldenburg (d. 1785)
- September 22 – Thomas Wright, English astronomer (d. 1786)
- September 23 – Louis Nicolas Victor de Félix d'Ollières, Marshal of France (d. 1775)
- September 25 – Qianlong Emperor, sixth Emperor of the Qing dynasty in China (d. 1799)
- September 26 – Richard Grenville-Temple, 2nd Earl Temple, British politician and first Lord of the Admiralty (d. 1779)
- September 28 – Joseph Richardson Sr., American silversmith (d. 1784)

=== October–December ===
- October 8 – Kumara Swamy Desikar, Indian philosopher (d. 1810)
- October 9 – James Grimston, 2nd Viscount Grimston, British peer and Member of Parliament (d. 1773)
- October 14 – John Smith, British astronomer (d. 1795)
- October 15
  - William Cooke, English cleric and academic (d. 1797)
  - Daniel Parke Custis, American planter (d. 1757)
  - Elisabeth Therese of Lorraine, Sardinian queen consort (d. 1741)
- October 17 – Jupiter Hammon, American writer (d. 1806)
- October 20 – Timothy Ruggles, American colonial politician (d. 1795)
- October 21 – Armand-Jérôme Bignon, French lawyer (d. 1772)
- October 31 – Laura Bassi, Italian physicist and academic (d. 1778)
- November 1 – Marcus Fredrik Bang, Norwegian bishop (d. 1789)
- November 5 – Kitty Clive, British actor (d. 1785)
- November 10 – Robert Hay Drummond, Archbishop of York (d. 1776)
- November 11 – Stepan Krasheninnikov, Russian scientist (d. 1755)
- November 18 – Franz Töpsl, German historian and Augustinian Canon Regular (d. 1796)
- November 19
  - John Berrien, farmer and merchant from Rocky Hill (d. 1772)
  - Mikhail Lomonosov, Russian polymath (d. 1765)
- November 20 – Niclas Gustaf Duncan, Swedish post official and spy (d. 1771)
- November 21 – Samuel Morris, merchant and Patriot in colonial and revolutionary-era Philadelphia (d. 1782)
- November 27 – Gerard Joan Vreeland, 28th Governor of Ceylon during the Dutch period in Ceylon (d. 1752)
- November 30 – Ebenezer Kinnersley, American scientist (d. 1778)
- December 4 – Barbara of Portugal, infanta of Portugal and later Queen of Ferdinand VI of Spain (d. 1758)
- December 21 – Thomas Whitmore, British Whig politician and MP (d. 1773)
- December 23 – Jacob Fortling, German-Danish sculptor (d. 1761)
- December 25 – Jean-Joseph de Mondonville, French composer and violinist (d. 1772)
- December 26 – Maria Menshikova, daughter of Aleksandr Danilovich Menshikov (d. 1729)
- December 28 – Samuel Egerton, British landowner and politician (d. 1780)
- Full Date Unknown – Mariot Arbuthnot, British admiral during the American War for Independence (d. 1794)
  - Susanna Passavant, Jeweller and toy designer (d. 1790)

== Deaths ==
- January 6 – Philips van Almonde, Dutch admiral (b. 1644)

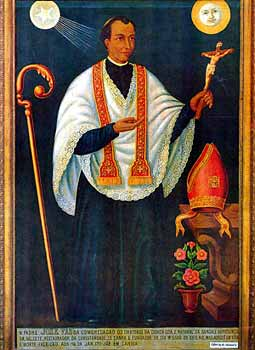
Joseph Vaz

- January 16 – Blessed Joseph Vaz, Apostle of Ceylon (b. 1651)
- January 10 – John Manners, 1st Duke of Rutland, English nobleman and politician (b. 1638)
- January 21 – Augustinus Terwesten, 18th century painter from the Northern Netherlands (b. 1649)
- January 26 – Luis Francisco de la Cerda, Spanish noble, politician (b. 1660)
- February 3 – Francesco Maria de' Medici, Duke of Rovere and Montefeltro, Italian Catholic cardinal (b. 1660)
- March 3 – Charles, Landgrave of Hesse-Wanfried (1676–1711) (b. 1649)
- March 13 – Nicolas Boileau-Despréaux, French poet and critic (b. 1636)
- March 15 – Eusebio Kino, Italian Catholic missionary (b. 1645)
- March 19 – Thomas Ken, English bishop and hymn-writer (b. 1637)
- March 29 – Gabriel Gerberon, French Jansenist monk (b. 1628)
- April 9 – Charles Duncombe, British politician (b. 1648)

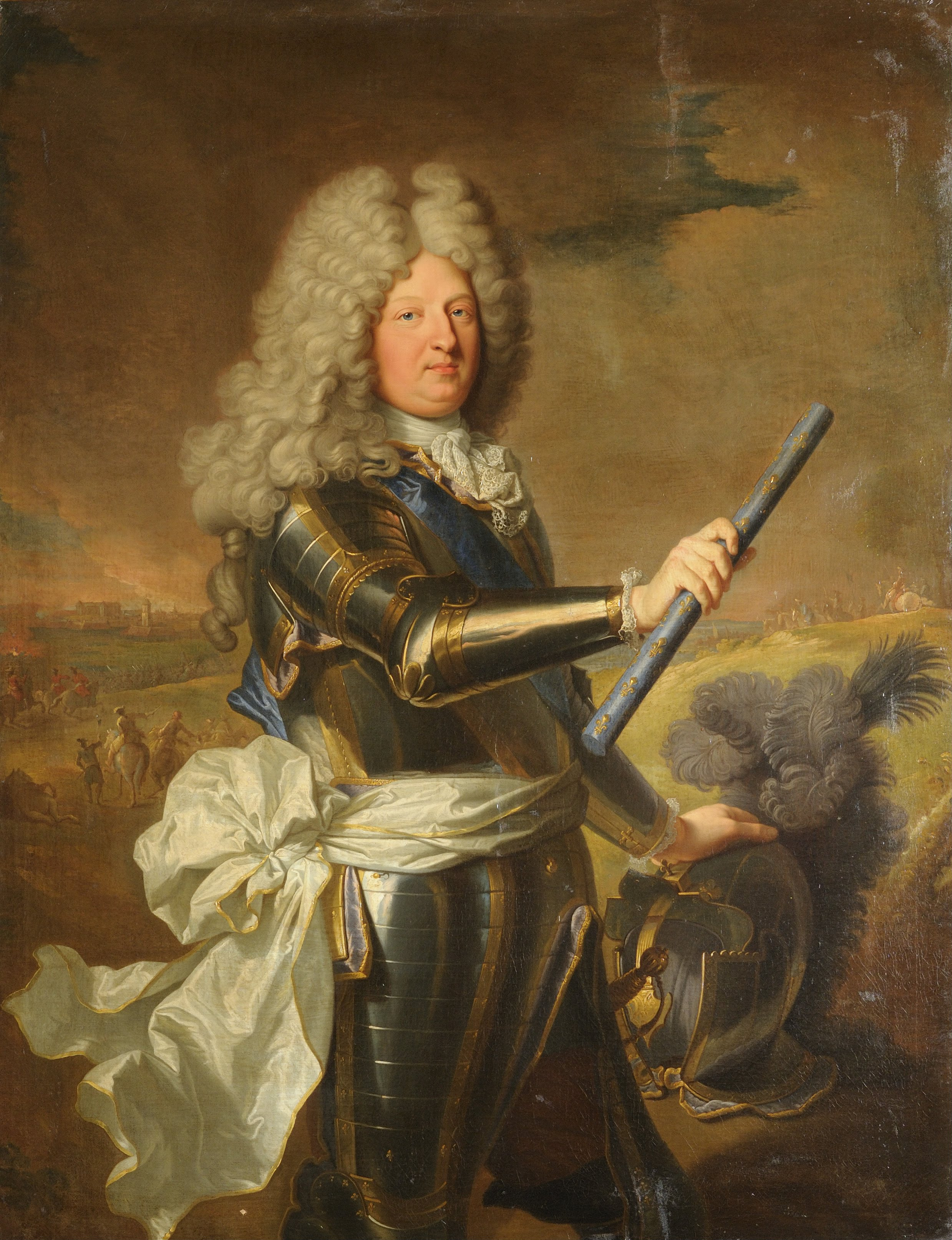
Louis, Grand Dauphin

- April 14 – Louis, Grand Dauphin, son of Louis XIV (b. 1661)
- April 17 – Joseph I, Holy Roman Emperor (b. 1678)
- May 2 – Laurence Hyde, 1st Earl of Rochester, English statesman (b. 1641)
- June 7 – Henry Dodwell, Irish theologian (b. 1641)
- June 8 – Katharyne Lescailje, Dutch writer (b. 1649)
- June 16 – Maria Amalia of Courland, Landgravine of Hesse-Kassel (b. 1653)
- July 6 – James Douglas, 2nd Duke of Queensberry, Scottish politician (b. 1662)
- July 11 – Joseph Ball, American settler, public servant, and maternal grandfather of George Washington (b. 1649)
- July 15 – John Holles, 1st Duke of Newcastle, England (b. 1662)
- July 18 – Richard Verney, 11th Baron Willoughby de Broke, English baron (b. 1622)
- July 19 – Date Tsunamune, Japanese daimyō of Sendai han (b. 1640)
- August 22 – Louis François, duc de Boufflers, Marshal of France (b. 1644)
- August 25 – Edward Villiers, 1st Earl of Jersey, English politician (b. c. 1656)
- August 30 – Pieter Spierinckx, Flemish painter (b. 1635)
- August 31 – Jean Le Pelletier, French polygraph and alchemist (b. 1633)
- September 3 – Élisabeth Sophie Chéron, French musician (b. 1648)
- September 14 – Claude Aveneau, French missionary (b. 1650)
- September 17 – Giovanni Maria Gabrielli, Italian Catholic cardinal (b. 1654)
- September 19 – Davide Cocco Palmieri, Italian Catholic bishop (b. 1632)
- September 22 – William Bartram, English-born politician and settler (b. 1674)
- October 5 – Paulet St John, 3rd Earl of Bolingbroke, English politician (b. 1634)
- October 14 – Tewoflos, Emperor of Ethiopia
- October 30 – Wilhelmus à Brakel, Dutch theologian (b. 1635)
- November 3
  - John Ernest Grabe, German-born Anglican theologian (b. 1666)
  - Giordano Vitale, Italian mathematician (b. 1633)
- Date unknown – Cille Gad, Norwegian poet (b. 1675)
