= 1633 =

1633 in various calendars
- Gregorian calendar: 1633; MDCXXXIII
- Ab urbe condita: 2386
- Armenian calendar: 1082; ԹՎ ՌՁԲ
- Assyrian calendar: 6383
- Balinese saka calendar: 1554–1555
- Bengali calendar: 1039–1040
- Berber calendar: 2583
- English Regnal year: 8 Cha. 1 – 9 Cha. 1
- Buddhist calendar: 2177
- Burmese calendar: 995
- Byzantine calendar: 7141–7142
- Chinese calendar: 壬申年 (Water Monkey); 4330 or 4123 — to — 癸酉年 (Water Rooster); 4331 or 4124
- Coptic calendar: 1349–1350
- Discordian calendar: 2799
- Ethiopian calendar: 1625–1626
- Hebrew calendar: 5393–5394
- Hindu calendars
- Vikram Samvat: 1689–1690
- Shaka Samvat: 1554–1555
- Kali Yuga: 4733–4734
- Holocene calendar: 11633
- Igbo calendar: 633–634
- Iranian calendar: 1011–1012
- Islamic calendar: 1042–1043
- Japanese calendar: Kan'ei 10 (寛永１０年)
- Javanese calendar: 1554–1555
- Julian calendar: Gregorian minus 10 days
- Korean calendar: 3966
- Minguo calendar: 279 before ROC 民前279年
- Nanakshahi calendar: 165
- Thai solar calendar: 2175–2176
- Tibetan calendar: ཆུ་ཕོ་སྤྲེ་ལོ་ (male Water-Monkey); 1759 or 1378 or 606 — to — ཆུ་མོ་བྱ་ལོ་ (female Water-Bird); 1760 or 1379 or 607

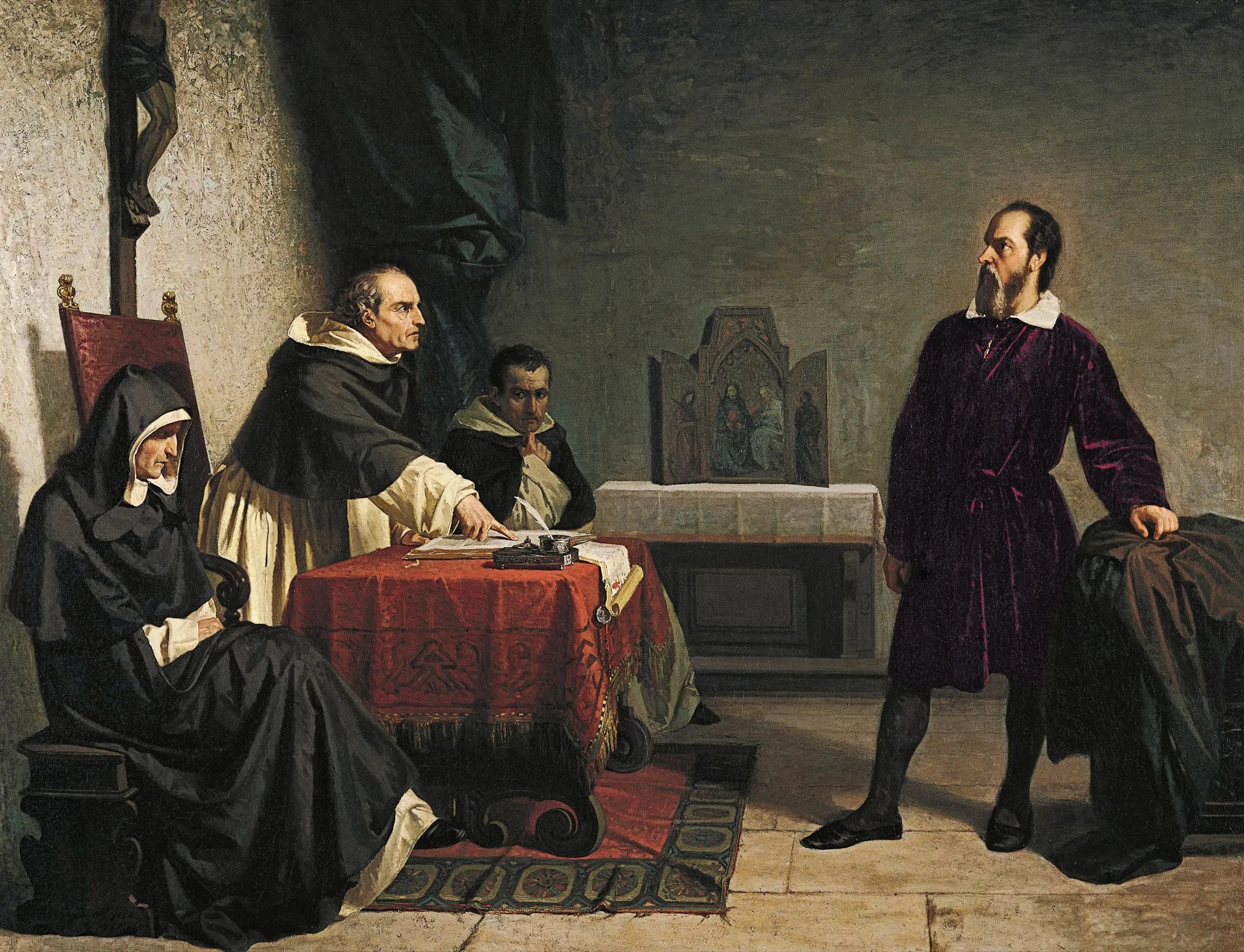
April 12: Galileo is convicted of heresy at an inquisition in Rome, after refusing to abandon his controversial teaching that the Earth revolves around the Sun.

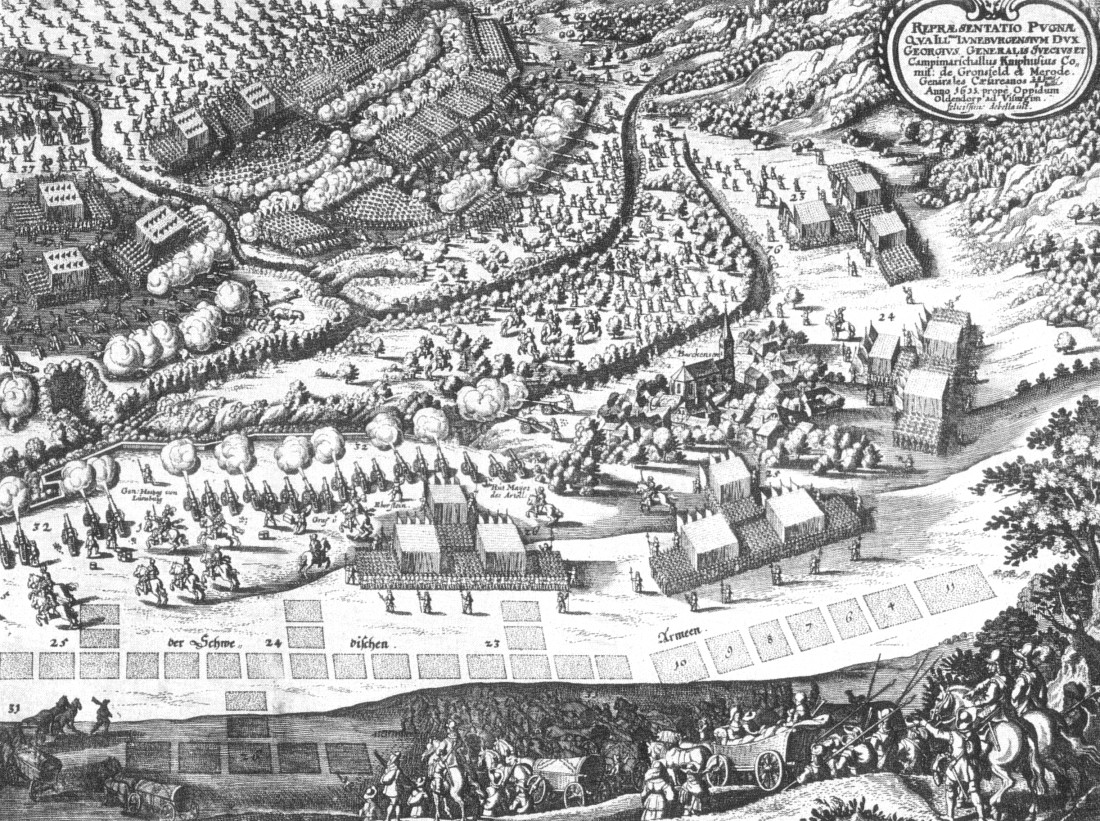
July 8: Battle of Oldendorf

1633 (MDCXXXIII) was a common year starting on Saturday of the Gregorian calendar and a common year starting on Tuesday of the Julian calendar, the 1633rd year of the Common Era (CE) and Anno Domini (AD) designations, the 633rd year of the 2nd millennium, the 33rd year of the 17th century, and the 4th year of the 1630s decade. As of the start of 1633, the Gregorian calendar was 10 days ahead of the Julian calendar, which remained in localized use until 1923.

== Events ==
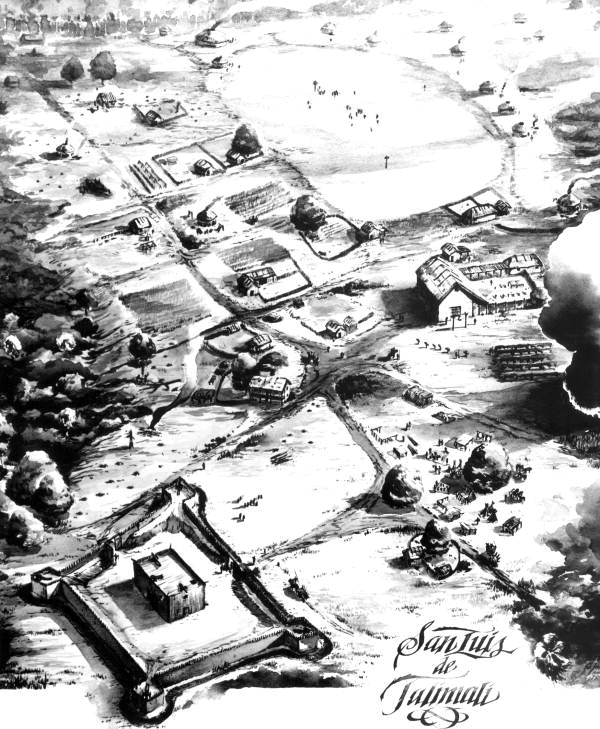
Mission San Luis de Apalachee is built.

=== January–March ===
- January 20 – Galileo Galilei, having been summoned to Rome on orders of Pope Urban VIII, leaves for Florence for his journey. His carriage is halted at Ponte a Centino at the border of Tuscany, where he is quarantined for 22 days because of an outbreak of the plague.
- February 6 – the formal coronation of Władysław IV Vasa as King of Poland takes place at the cathedral in Kraków. He had been elected as king on November 8.
- February 9 – the Duchy of Hesse-Cassel captures Dorsten from the Electorate of Cologne without resistance.
- February 13
  - Galileo Galilei arrives in Rome for his trial before the Inquisition.
  - Fire engines are used for the first time in England in order to control and extinguish a fire that breaks out at London Bridge, but not before 43 houses are destroyed.
- March 1 – Samuel de Champlain reclaims his role as commander of New France, on behalf of Cardinal Richelieu.

=== April–June ===
- April 12 – Galileo Galilei is convicted of heresy by the Roman Catholic Church.
- May 22 – Samuel de Champlain, founder of the French colony of New France, returns to Quebec after being gone for four years, commissioned as Lieutenant General of the troops of New France, but not as governor.
- May 28 – Aurangzeb, Crown Prince of the Mughal Empire in India, narrowly escapes death when an elephant stampedes through his encampment, but is able to defend himself with a lance.
- June 18 – Charles I is crowned King of Scots at St Giles' Cathedral, Edinburgh, according to Anglican rite in his first visit to Scotland since early childhood, although he has been Scottish monarch since 1625.
- June 22 – the Roman Catholic Church forces Galileo Galilei to recant his heliocentric view of the Solar System. According to legend, he claims Eppur si muove.

=== July–September ===
- July 7 – the Dutch East India Company fleet, led by Hans Putmans, attacks its ally Zheng Zhilong's base by surprise, near Xiamen.
- July 8
  - Thirty Years' War: Battle of Oldendorf – Sweden defeats the Holy Roman Empire near Hessisch Oldendorf.
  - The Javanese calendar is commenced on this day by the order of Sultan Agung of the Mataram Sultanate. It is the Javanese adaptation of the Hijri calendar, but it continues the year numbering of the Shaka era widely used in Java then, thus the calendar's epoch is 1 Sura 1555 AJ, corresponding with 1 Muharram 1043 AH.
- August 6 – William Laud becomes Archbishop of Canterbury.
- September 25 – King Louis XIII enters into Nancy, marking the occupation of the Duchy of Lorraine by France.
- September 26 – a group from the Plymouth Colony settles in Windsor, Connecticut, making it the first settlement in the state.

=== October–December ===
- October 17 – Thirty Years' War: Siege of Rheinfelden – Spain recaptures Rheinfelden from Sweden.
- October 22 – Battle of Liaoluo Bay: A large Ming dynasty fleet under Zheng Zhilong defeats a Dutch East India Company fleet at the island of Quemoy.
- November 11 – the Dutch expedition of Jan Janszoon van Hoorn, against Spanish pirates in Central America, ends after six months with van Hoorn's success.
- November 22 – commissioned by Cecil Calvert, 2nd Baron Baltimore to transport 140 English colonists to the province of Maryland in America, The Ark and another ship, the Dove (with 128 settlers), depart Gravesend in England for the New World. Three days later, the two ships become separated by a storm in the English Channel, and the crew of The Ark assumes that the Dove sank.
- November 29 – The Ark runs into a more violent storm, but manages to stay afloat and to continue on its journey to America. The Dove turns out to have survived the storms, and both ships will arrive in Maryland on February 24.
- December 9 – Francisco de Murga, Spain's Governor of the South American province of Cartagena (now in Colombia), crushes a revolt by escaped African slaves in an attack against the palenque of Limón. De Murga captures 80 residents, and, after a trial, has 13 executed, with the drawing and quartering of their bodies.

=== Date unknown ===
- The Jews of Poznań are granted the privilege of forbidding Christians to enter into their city quarter.
- Emperor of Ethiopia Fasilides expels Jesuit missionaries.
- Shogun Tokugawa Iemitsu of Japan issues the Sakoku Edict of 1635 outlawing Christianity, enforcing a policy of extreme isolationism (sakoku) until 1853.
- St Columb's Cathedral, Derry, Ireland, the first post-Reformation Anglican cathedral built in the British Isles and the first Protestant cathedral built in Europe, is completed.
- Mission San Luis de Apalachee is built in the New World by two Spanish friars.
- English colonists settle what will become the town of Hingham, Massachusetts.
- A professorship in Arabic studies is founded at the University of Cambridge in England.
- Trịnh–Nguyễn War: Trịnh Tráng launched an attack on Đàng Trong at the Nhật Lệ estuary. This was marked as the second clash in the civil war.

== Births ==
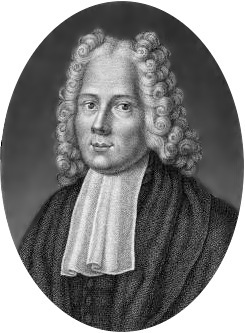
Alessandro Marchetti

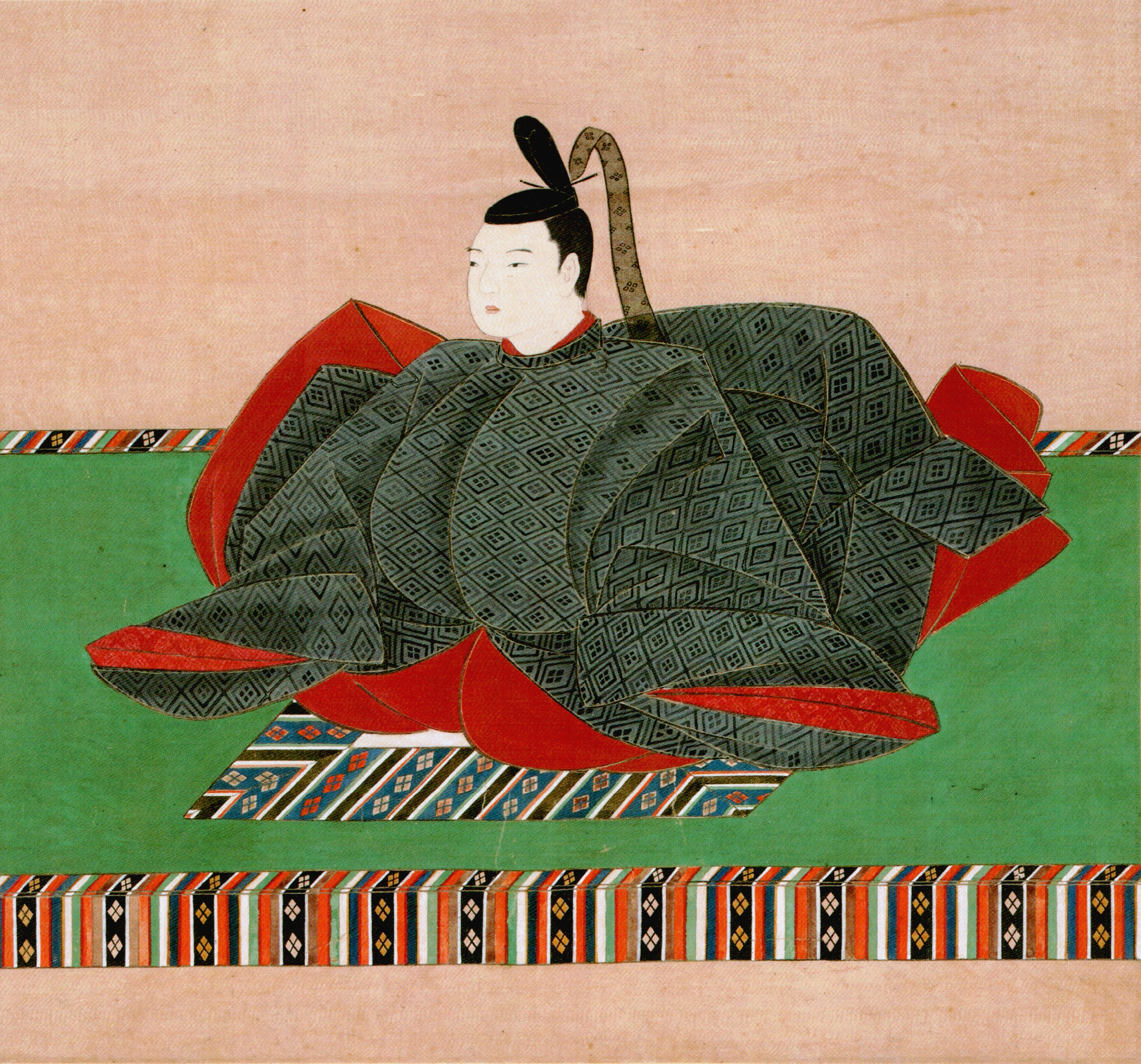
Emperor Go-Kōmyō

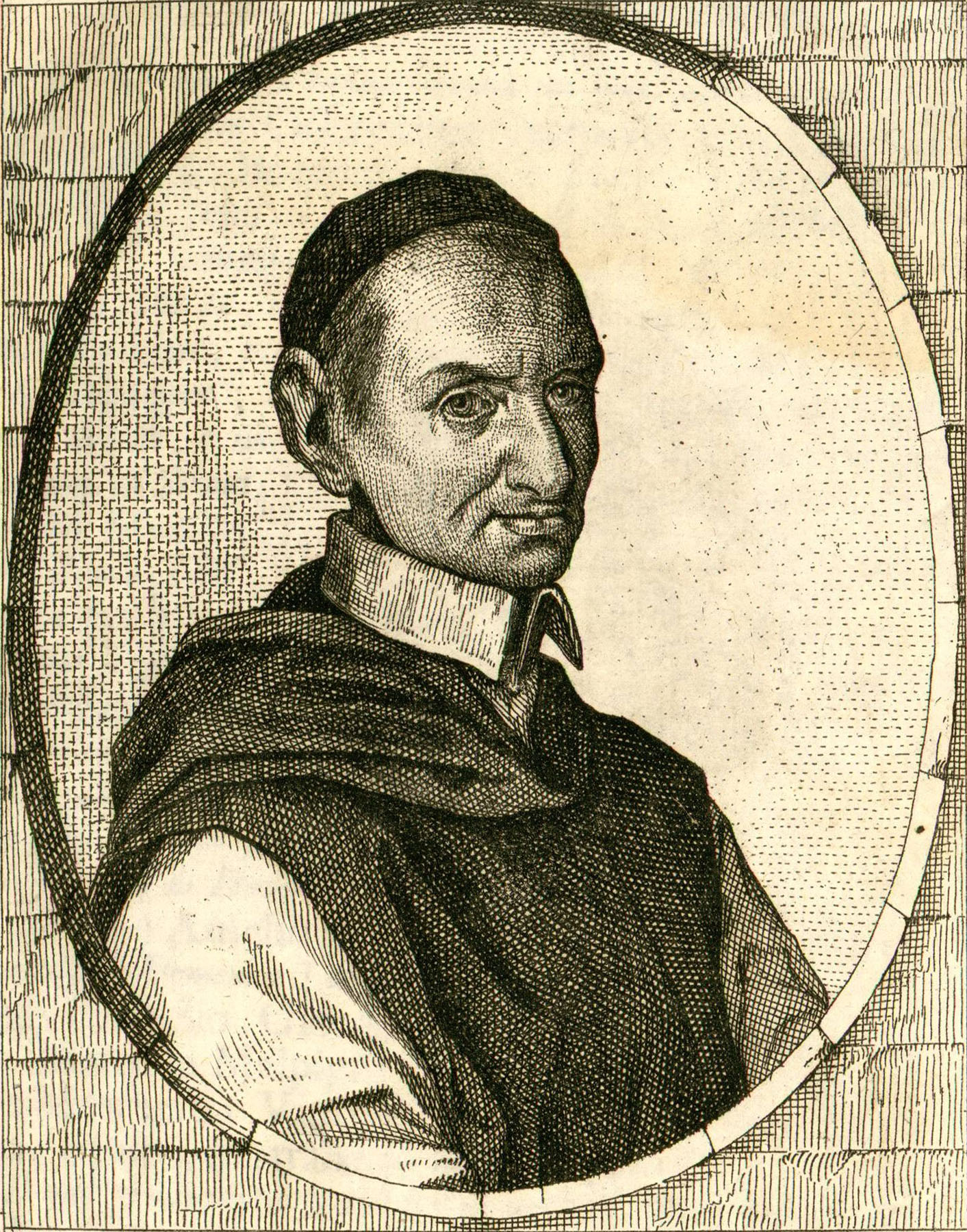
Paolo Boccone

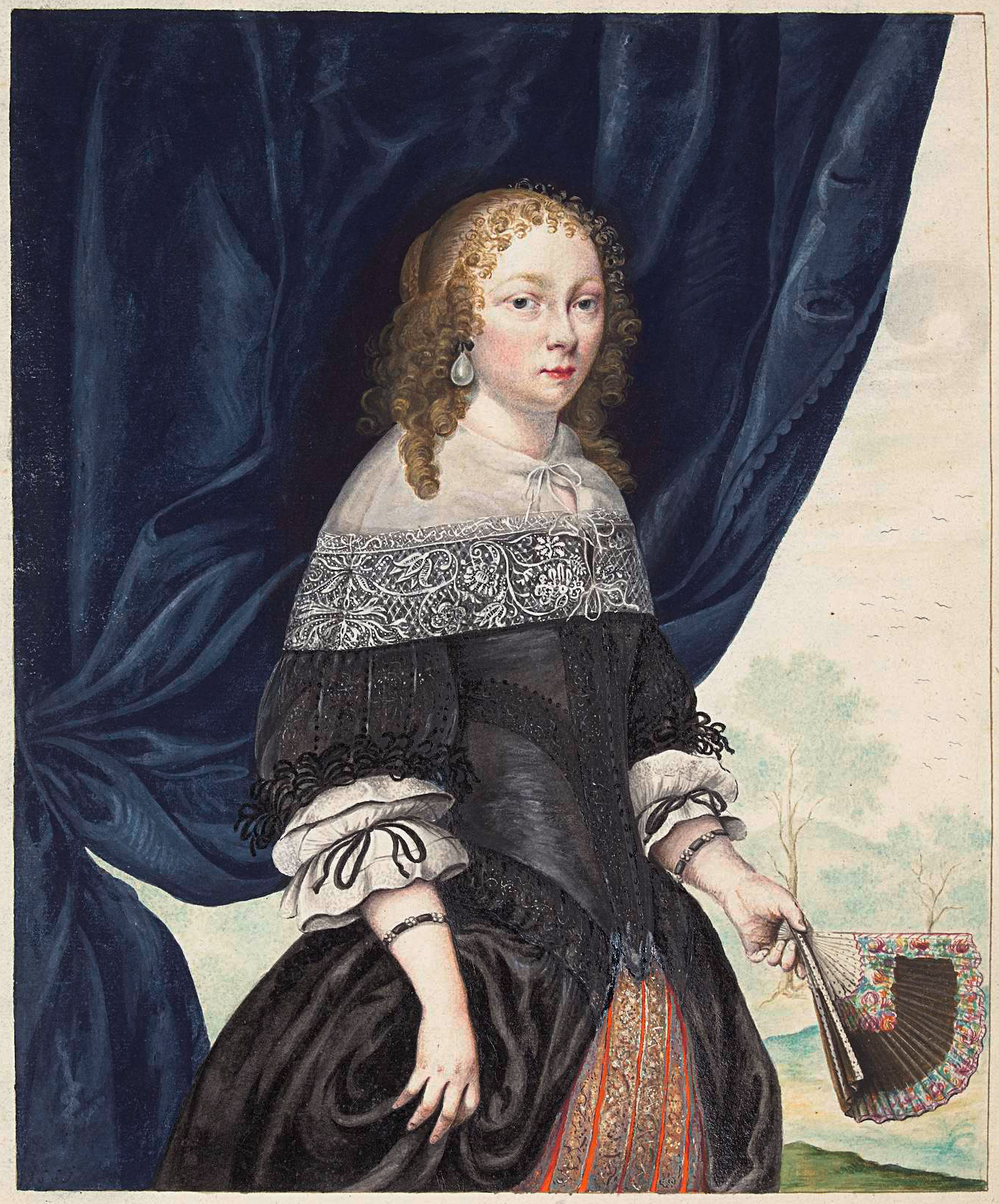
Gesina ter Borch

=== January–March ===
- January 20 – Edmund Maine, English Member of Parliament (d. 1711)
- January 31 – Nathaniel Crew, 3rd Baron Crew of England (d. 1721)
- February 20 – Jan de Baen, Dutch portrait painter (d. 1702)
- February 23
  - Charles Patin, French physician (d. 1693)
  - Samuel Pepys, English civil servant and diarist (d. 1703)
- February 26 – Gustav Adolph, Duke of Mecklenburg-Güstrow and last Administrator of Ratzeburg (d. 1695)
- March 1 – Yi Sŏu, Korean scholar (d. 1709)
- March 7 – Giovanni Battista Volpati, Italian painter (d. 1706)
- March 12 – Sir John Evelyn, 1st Baronet, of Godstone, English noble (d. 1671)
- March 17 – Alessandro Marchetti, Italian mathematician (d. 1714)
- March 25 – Samuel Whiting, Jr., American clergyman (d. 1713)
- March 26 – Mary Beale, British artist (d. 1699)
- March 30
  - Miron Costin, Moldavian (Romanian) political figure and chronicler (d. 1691)
  - Frederick II, Landgrave of Hesse-Homburg, German general, Landgraf of Hesse-Homburg (d. 1708)

=== April–June ===
- April 16 – Salomon Jansz van den Tempel, Dutch shipbuilder (d. 1673)
- April 19
  - Willem Drost, Dutch painter (d. 1659)
  - Abraham Hill, British merchant (d. 1721)
- April 20 – Emperor Go-Kōmyō of Japan (d. 1654)
- April 24
  - Paolo Boccone, Italian botanist from Sicily (d. 1704)
  - Gilbert Holles, 3rd Earl of Clare, English politician and earl (d. 1689)
- May 1
  - Walter Chetwynd, English antiquary, politician (d. 1693)
  - Sébastien Le Prestre de Vauban, French noble and military engineer noted for designing fortifications (d. 1707)
- May 21 – Joseph Chabanceau de La Barre, French composer (d. 1678)
- June 1 – Geminiano Montanari, Italian astronomer (d. 1687)
- June 16 – Jean de Thévenot, French traveler and scientist (d. 1667)
- June 19 – Philipp van Limborch, Dutch Protestant theologian (d. 1712)
- June 27 – Auguste of Schleswig-Holstein-Sonderburg-Glücksburg, German noble (d. 1701)

=== July–September ===
- July 1 – Johann Heinrich Heidegger, Swiss theologian (d. 1698)
- July 6 – Sir Henry Yelverton, 2nd Baronet, English Member of Parliament (d. 1670)
- July 12 – Thofania d'Adamo, Italian poisoner
- July 25 – Joseph Williamson, English politician (d. 1701)
- September 6 – Sebastian Knüpfer, German composer (d. 1676)
- September 7 – Catharina Regina von Greiffenberg, Austrian writer and noble (d. 1695)
- September 8 – Ferdinand IV, King of the Romans (d. 1654)
- September 15 – William Croone, English physician and one of the original Fellows of the Royal Society (d. 1684)

=== October–December ===
- October 4
  - Anthony Ulrich, Duke of Brunswick-Wolfenbüttel (d. 1714)
  - Bernardino Ramazzini, Italian physician (d. 1714)
- October 14 – King James II of England (d. 1701)
- October 15 – Giordano Vitale, Italian mathematician (d. 1711)
- October 19 – Benedetto Gennari II, Italian painter (d. 1715)
- October 25 – Esaias Fleischer, Danish priest (d. 1697)
- October 29 – Antonio Magliabechi, Italian librarian (d. 1714)
- November 2 – George Gordon, 15th Earl of Sutherland, Scottish noble (d. 1703)
- November 10 – Thomas Jermyn, 2nd Baron Jermyn, Governor of Jersey (d. 1703)
- November 11 – George Savile, 1st Marquess of Halifax, English writer and statesman (d. 1695)
- November 15 – Gesina ter Borch, Dutch Golden Age painter (d. 1690)
- November 20 – Étienne de Carheil, French Jesuit priest, missionary to the Iroquois and Huron Indians (d. 1726)
- November 26 – Johann Christoph Wagenseil, German Christian Hebraist (d. 1705)
- December 18 – Willem van de Velde the Younger, Dutch painter (d. 1707)
- December 27 – Jean de Lamberville, French missionary (d. 1714)
- December 29
  - Jean Le Pelletier, French polygraph and alchemist (d. 1711)
  - Johannes Zollikofer, Swiss vicar (d. 1692)

=== Date unknown ===
- Sir Edward Seymour, 4th Baronet, English politician (d. 1708)

== Deaths ==
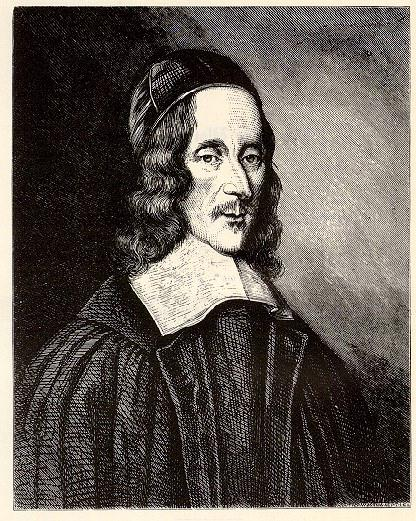
George Herbert

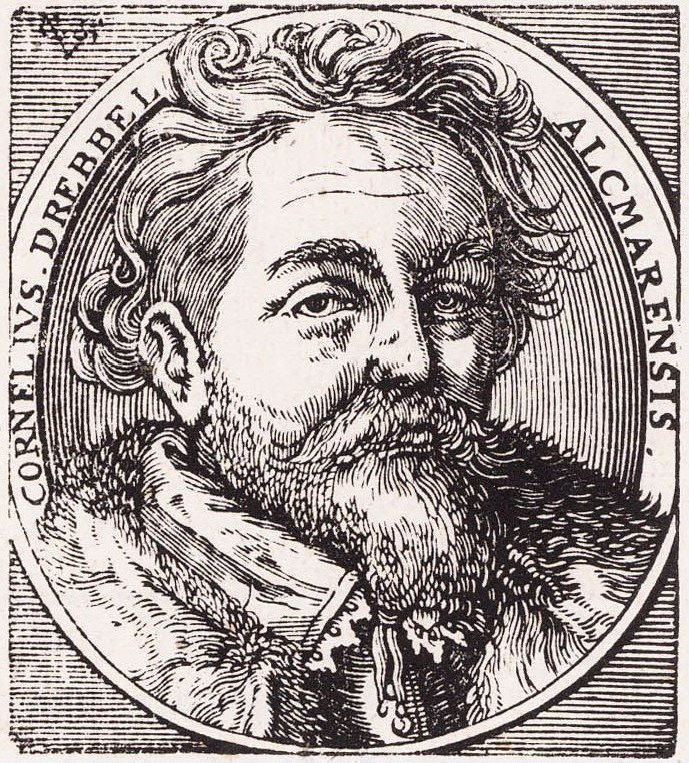
Cornelis Drebbel

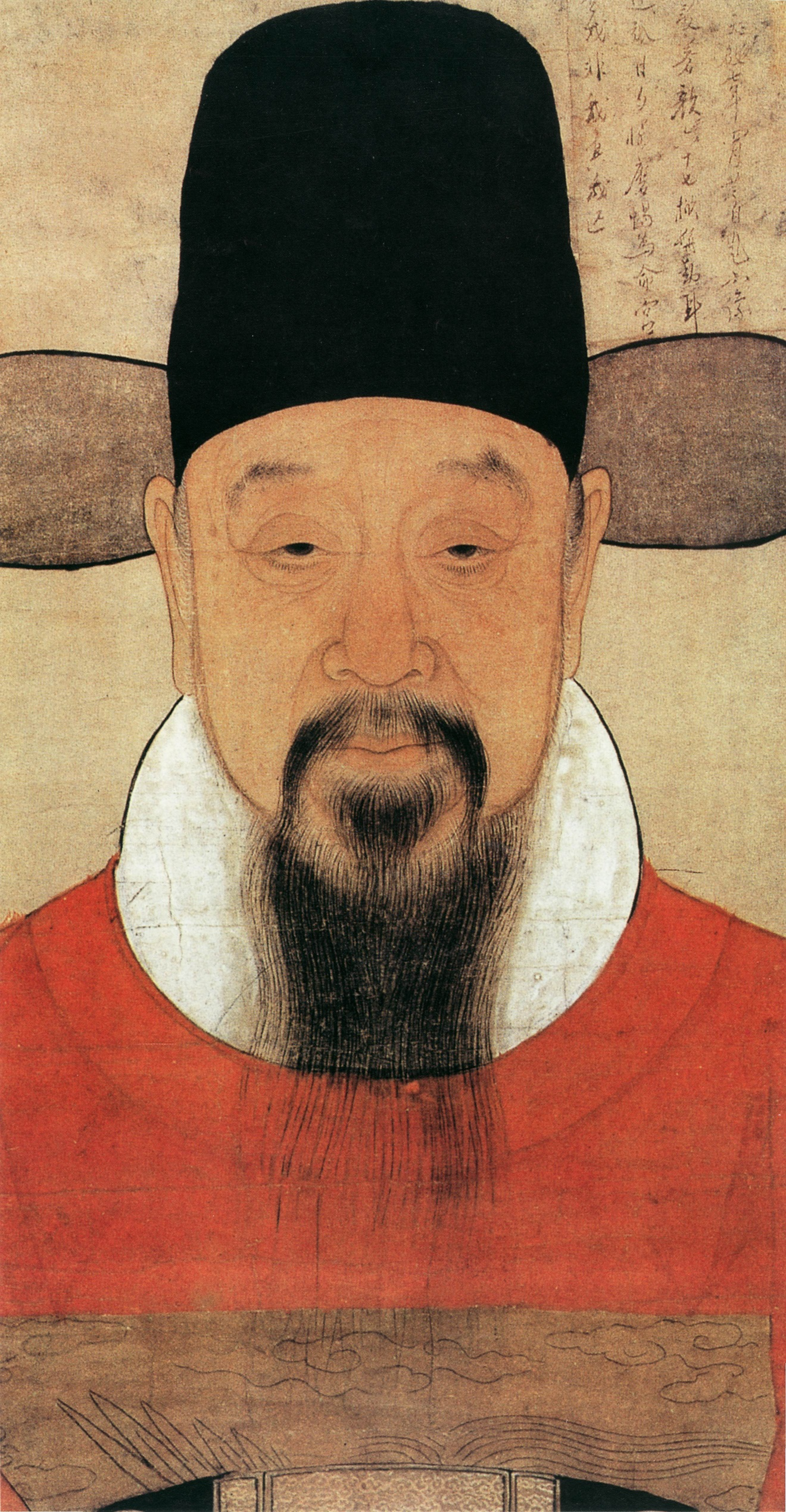
Xu Guangqi

- January 15 – Polykarp Leyser II, German theologian (b. 1586)
- January 20 – Elizabeth Stanley, Countess of Huntingdon, English noblewoman and writer (b. 1588)
- March 1 – George Herbert, English poet and orator (b. 1593)
- March 3 – Magnus Brahe, Swedish noble (b. 1564)
- April 21 – Scipione Dentice, Neapolitan keyboard composer (b. 1560)
- May 5 – Thomas Freke, English politician (b. 1563)
- May 16 – Magdalena of Nassau-Dillenburg, German noblewoman (b. 1547)
- May 21 – Wolfgang Ernst I of Isenburg-Büdingen-Birstein, German count (b. 1560)
- June – Étienne Brûlé, French explorer (b. c. 1592)
- June 11 – Johannes Crellius, Polish–German theologian (b. 1590)
- June 14 – Christian, Duke of Schleswig-Holstein-Sonderburg-Ærø (1622–1633) (b. 1570)
- July 1 – Thomas Robarts, English parliamentarian (b. 1568)
- July 5 – Archduchess Margaret of Austria (b. 1567)
- July 7 – Lew Sapieha, Polish-Lithuanian noble (b. 1557)
- July 16 – John Casimir, Duke of Saxe-Coburg (b. 1564)
- July 22 – Trijntje Keever, Dutchwoman, presumed to have been the tallest woman ever (b. 1616)
- August 5 – George Abbot, Archbishop of Canterbury (b. 1562)
- August 10 – Anthony Munday, English writer (b. 1553)
- August 12
  - Jacopo Peri, Italian composer (b. 1561)
  - Ulrik of Denmark, Danish prince-bishop (b. 1611)
- August 17 – Gertrude More, English nun (b. 1606)
- August 30 – Magdalene of Jülich-Cleves-Berg, Countess Palatine of Pfalz-Zweibrücken (b. 1553)
- September – Henry Cary, 1st Viscount Falkland (b. c. 1575)
- September 4 – Richard Cecil, English politician (b. 1570)
- September 22 – Joam Mattheus Adami, Italian Jesuit missionary (b. 1576)
- September 26 – Bernardino de Almansa Carrión, Spanish Catholic prelate and Archbishop (b. 1579)
- October 2 – Scipione Borghese, Italian Catholic cardinal and art collector (b. 1577)
- October 24 – Jean Titelouze, French organist (b. c.1562)
- October 26 – Horio Tadaharu, Japanese warlord (b. 1596)
- November 3 – Lucio Massari, Italian painter (b. 1569)
- November 7 – Cornelis Drebbel, Dutch inventor (b. 1572)
- November 8
  - Xu Guangqi, Chinese astronomer, Roman Catholic convert, mathematician, scholar, scientist and servant of God (b. 1562)
  - Christian, Duke of Brunswick-Lüneburg, Prince of Lüneburt (1611–1633) (b. 1566)
- November 14 – William Ames, English philosopher (b. 1576)
- December 1 – Infanta Isabella Clara Eugenia of Spain (b. 1566)
- December 8 – Theodoor Galle, Flemish engraver (b. 1571)
- December 12 – Hortensio Félix Paravicino, Spanish preacher and poet from the noble house of Pallavicini (b. 1580)
- December 17 or December 27 – Meletius Smotrytsky, Ruthenian religious activist and author (b. 1577)
- December 28 – Maria Maddalena de' Medici, Italian princess (b. 1600)
