= Battle of Wismar (1711) =

Engagement of the Great Northern War in 1711

- Part of the Great Northern War
| Date | 26 November 1711 (O.S.); 27 November 1711 (Swedish calendar); 5 December 1711 (N.S.) |
| Location | Wismar |
| Result | Danish victory |

Belligerents
| (Sweden) Swedish Empire | Denmark–Norway |

Commanders and leaders
| (Sweden) Martin von Schoultz | (Denmark–Norway) Jørgen Rantzau |

Strength
| 2,500 men | 5,000 men |

Casualties and losses
| 478 killed, 1,500 captured (of which 470 were wounded) | 279 killed and wounded |

The Battle of Wismar took place on 5 December 1711 (N.S.) close to Wismar, Swedish Empire during the Great Northern War. A 3,000 strong Danish force under the command of Jørgen Rantzau blocked the Swedish city of Wismar. The Swedes under Martin von Schoultz, sent out 2,500 men from their garrison in an attempt to surprise the Danish forces camping a distance away. However, the Danish commander got words of the approaching Swedes and countered them, resulting in 478 Swedes dead, with another 1,500 captured to only 300 Danes killed and wounded.

== Background ==
After the Swedish defeat at the Battle of Poltava in July 1709, Denmark-Norway again declared war on Sweden. The Danes now attempted an invasion of southern Sweden to reconquer Scania and Blekinge. However, the Danish Scania and Blekinge campaign 1709–1710 was defeated by General Magnus Stenbock at the Battle of Helsingborg on 10 March 1710. The Danish king Fredrik IV now decided to move the war effort from Scania to the Swedish possessions in northern Germany, consisting of Wismar, Swedish Pomerania and Bremen-Verden.

A Danish army of 19,000 men gathered in Holstein. The immediate goal was to conquer Wismar. The fortress had already been surrounded by a smaller force under Lieutenant General Hans Christof von Schönfeld. However, after pressure from the Saxons, Frederick IV decided to change the goal of the campaign from Wismar to Stralsund. The main Danish army now resumed its march through Mecklenburg towards Swedish Pomerania.

Lieutenant General Jørgen Rantzau was given command of the less important siege of Wismar. By December, the Danish force consisted of 28 cavalry squadrons and 2 infantry battalions. Rantzau, who had led the Danish army in the battle of Helsingborg, was eager to avenge the defeat. The Swedish garrison in Wismar consisted of 5,000 men divided into a dragoon regiment and 4 infantry regiments under the command of Martin Schoultz. During the siege, the Danish force's conditions gradually worsened, and it shrank to 4,000 men due to desertions and disease. Rantzau further weakened its strength by sending 1,000 men to Rostock and Lübeck for provisions. As soon as Schoultz was informed of the weakened position of the besieging Danes, he decided to initiate a surprise attack on the Danish camp at Lübow early in the morning. Before the attack, Schoultz gathered a total of 2,500 men, which consisted of six infantry battalions and six cavalry squadrons as well as 12 artillery pieces.

On the night of 4 December (N.S.), the Swedish troops approached the Danish camp in silence. However, Danish scouts managed to detect the Swedish troops. When Rantzau was informed of the coming Swedish attack, he lined up his army in battle order.

== Battle ==
At 5:00 in the morning, the Swedish army went on the offensive. The Swedish left wing collided with the Danish right, which soon began to falter. However, Danish reinforcements managed to stop the Swedish attack and the fighting became very bloody. The Swedish artillery could not support the infantry and their fire resulted in losses in their own ranks. The Swedish battalions had now come into disarray and Schoultz ordered a retreat. However, the Swedish retreat was hindered by the Danish cavalry, which attacked the Swedes' flanks. Rantzau personally led a cavalry squadron that attacked the Swedes from behind.

The inferior Swedish cavalry was now forced to withdraw, which left the infantry alone. The well-trained Carolean infantry now formed squares to withstand the Danish cavalry. The Danes attacked again and again but did not manage to break the Swedish formations despite the Swedes suffering heavy losses. Now the remnants of the Swedish army were completely surrounded by the Danes but still refused to surrender. After repeated Danish attacks, the remaining Swedes were finally forced to give up.

The Swedes lost 478 men killed and 1,904 captured, of whom 500 were wounded. However, the Swedish commander Schoultz and about 100 men managed to escape. The Danish losses amounted to only 279 dead and wounded. The Danes also managed to capture the Swedes' artillery.

== Aftermath ==
After the Swedish defeat at Wismar, the Danes together with Russian and Saxon troops began a siege of Stralsund. However, the siege had to be stopped when a Swedish army under Magnus Stenbock landed in Pomerania in the autumn of 1712.
