= Jean-Baptiste Coye =

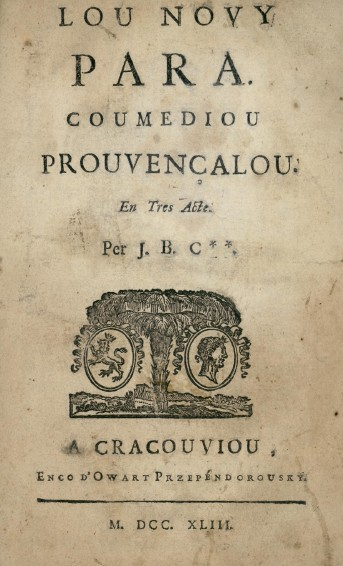

Jean-Baptiste Coye (June 6, 1711 – February 17, 1771) was an Occitan language writer from Mouriès, Provence, France. His name is written as Joan Baptista Còia in classical occitan.

Coye's work is included in Archard's Provençal anthology Lou Bouquet Provençaou and is recognised as among the foremost of Provence's 18th century authors.

He is the author of a 1743 comedy entitled Lou Novy para (written as Lo Nòvi parat in classical Occitan) which, according to Occitan critic Robèrt Lafont, obtained a "lasting success". Coye also composed the poem Lou Délire.

== Editions ==
- Oeuvres complète de J. B. Coye en vers provençaux. Arles : Mesnier, 1829.
- Lou Bouquet Prouvençaou. Marselha : Achard, 1823.

== Bibliography ==
- Anatole, Cristian. Lafont, Robèrt. Nouvelle histoire de la littérature occitane. París : PUF, 1

970.
