= Jørgen Rantzau =

Danish military officer (1652–1713)

Jørgen Rantzau (1652–1713) was a Danish Major general who fought several campaigns under John Churchill, 1st Duke of Marlborough.

== Biography ==
Jørgen Rantzau came from a military family. He was the son of Colonel Frantz Rantzau of Estvadgård (ca. 1620-1670) and the younger brother of Major General Johan Rantzau (1650-1708). In 1678, Rantzau became Lieutenant Colonel, in 1682 Colonel and in 1691 Lieutenant commander in Jutland. In 1701, he became Brigade commander and in 1705 he became General major.

He fought under Marlborough in 1691 during the War of the Grand Alliance. At the Battle of Blenheim, he commanded the 4th Jydske Dragoon Regiment. At the Battle of Oudenaarde in 1708, he commanded the cavalry in the vanguard under British army officer William Cadogan, 1st Earl Cadogan and played an important role in the early stages of the battle. The collaboration between the older and more experienced Rantzau under the younger, less experienced Cadogan is an example of the congruence in Marlborough's multinational army.

In 1709, Denmark re-entered the Great Northern War against Sweden and Rantzau returned to Denmark to participate as lieutenant-general in the invasion of Scania under Christian Detlev Reventlow. This led to the Battle of Helsingborg (1710). Just prior to the battle, Reventlow was taken ill and had to yield command to Jørgen Rantzau. The battle was a decisive Swedish victory and marked the end of any realistic hopes for Denmark to recover the Scanian territories. Subsequently Rantzau was given command of the blockade corps confronting the Swedish fortifications around the city of Wismar. However he became ill and had to be brought to Lübeck. He died on 10 March 1713 at Lübeck.
