= Joseph Umstatt =

Austrian composer

- Born: February 5, 1711; Vienna
- Died: May 24, 1762 (aged 51); Bamberg
- Occupations: Composer, kapellmeister, musician

Joseph Umstatt (5 February 1711 in Vienna – 24 May 1762 in Bamberg) was an Austrian composer and kapellmeister of the early Classical era.

== Life ==
Joseph Umstatt grew up in Vienna, and may have been a pupil of Johann Joseph Fux. From 1727 to 1730 he studied at the Jesuit College in Tyrnau, one of the distinguished centres of music education in the then-Kingdom of Hungary (today Trnava in Slovakia). He was a harpsichordist and organist at the chapel of Imre Esterhazy (Archbishop of Esztergom) in Pressburg (Bratislava), and later under the Count of Dietrichstein near Brünn (Brno). The Saxon Prime Minister Heinrich von Brühl engaged Umstatt as Hofkapellmeister shortly before his death in 1762.

== Works ==
Umstatt wrote baroque harpsichord music. He composed sacred music such as oratorios, masses (e.g. the "Missa Natalitia") and requiems, as well as secular musical dramas. However, the majority of his work consists of symphonies, concertos, and chamber music. Johann Ulrich Haffner included one of Umstatt's sonatas in a compilation of works for keyboard.
