= Samuel Morris (merchant) =

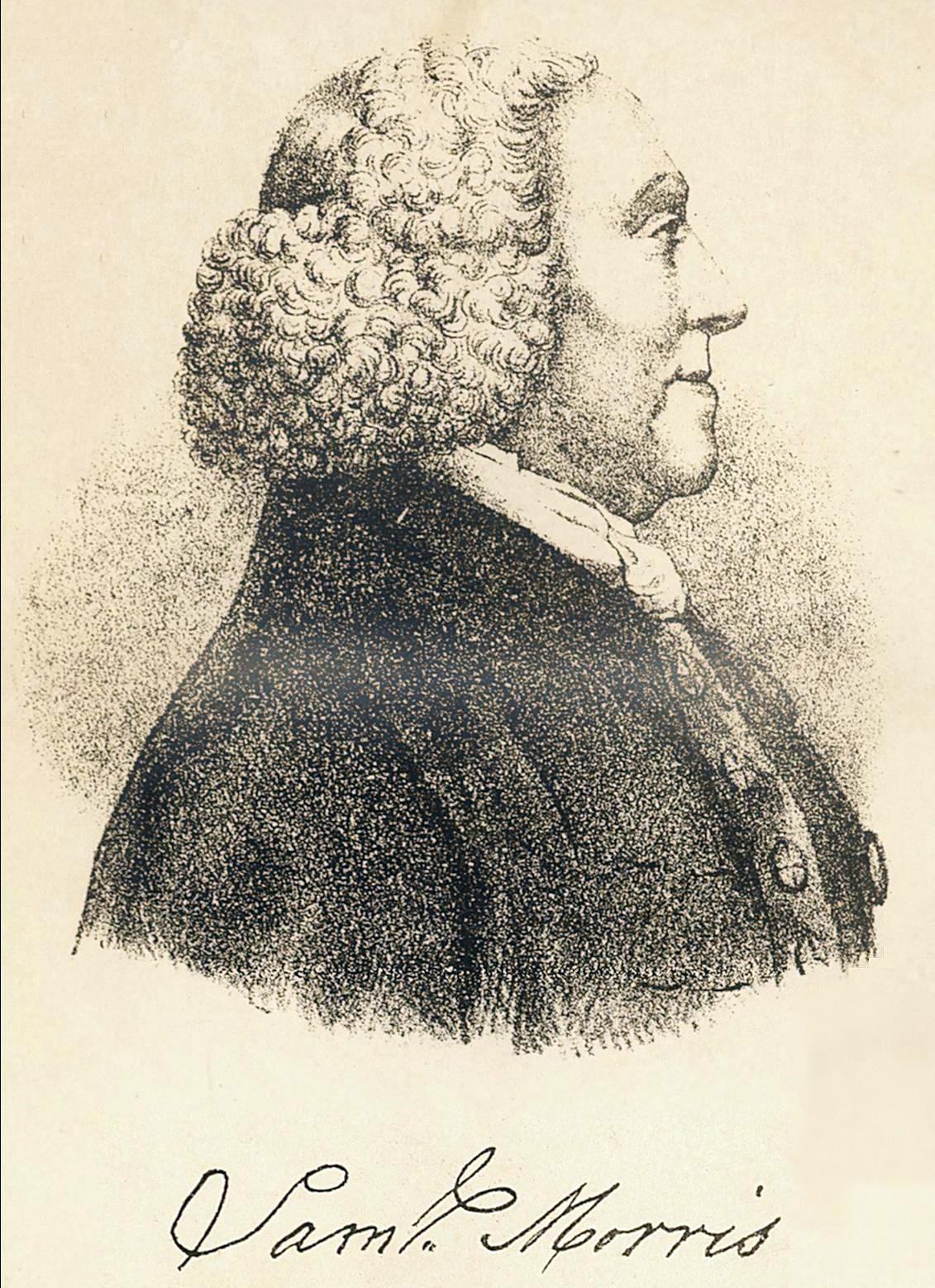

Samuel Morris (November 21, 1711 – April 1782) was a merchant and Patriot in colonial and revolutionary-era Philadelphia, Pennsylvania.

== Formative years and family ==
Born in Philadelphia on November 21, 1711, Samuel Morris was a son of Anthony Morris, and the husband of Hannah Cadwalader. Their sons James and Samuel Cadwalader attended the Academy of Philadelphia during its earliest years; Samuel Cadwalader Morris became a member of the College (later the University of Pennsylvania), class of 1760.

== Career ==
Morris took an active part in the affairs of the Province of Pennsylvania. In 1756, he was commissioned by Governor Robert Hunter Morris as an auditor, and was authorized to settle the accounts of the ill-fated Braddock expedition.

A zealous advocate of independence, he was also a member of the committee of safety and the board of war during the American Revolution. In 1777, he was appointed register of wills of Philadelphia, an office he held until 1782. From 1779 until his death, he was a trustee of the University of Pennsylvania.

== Death ==
Morris died in Philadelphia in April 1782.
