= Giovanni Battista Volpati =

Italian painter

Giovanni Battista Volpati or Volpato (March 7, 1633 – 1706) was an Italian painter of the Baroque period. He was born in Bassano. He was the author of some treatises on the fine arts. The most important of these is La Verità Pittoresca.

His father tried to make him follow a profession as a clergy man. He abandoned this to dedicate himself to designa and art. He studied engraving with Marco Sadeler in Venice.
