= Job Baster =

Dutch physician and naturalist

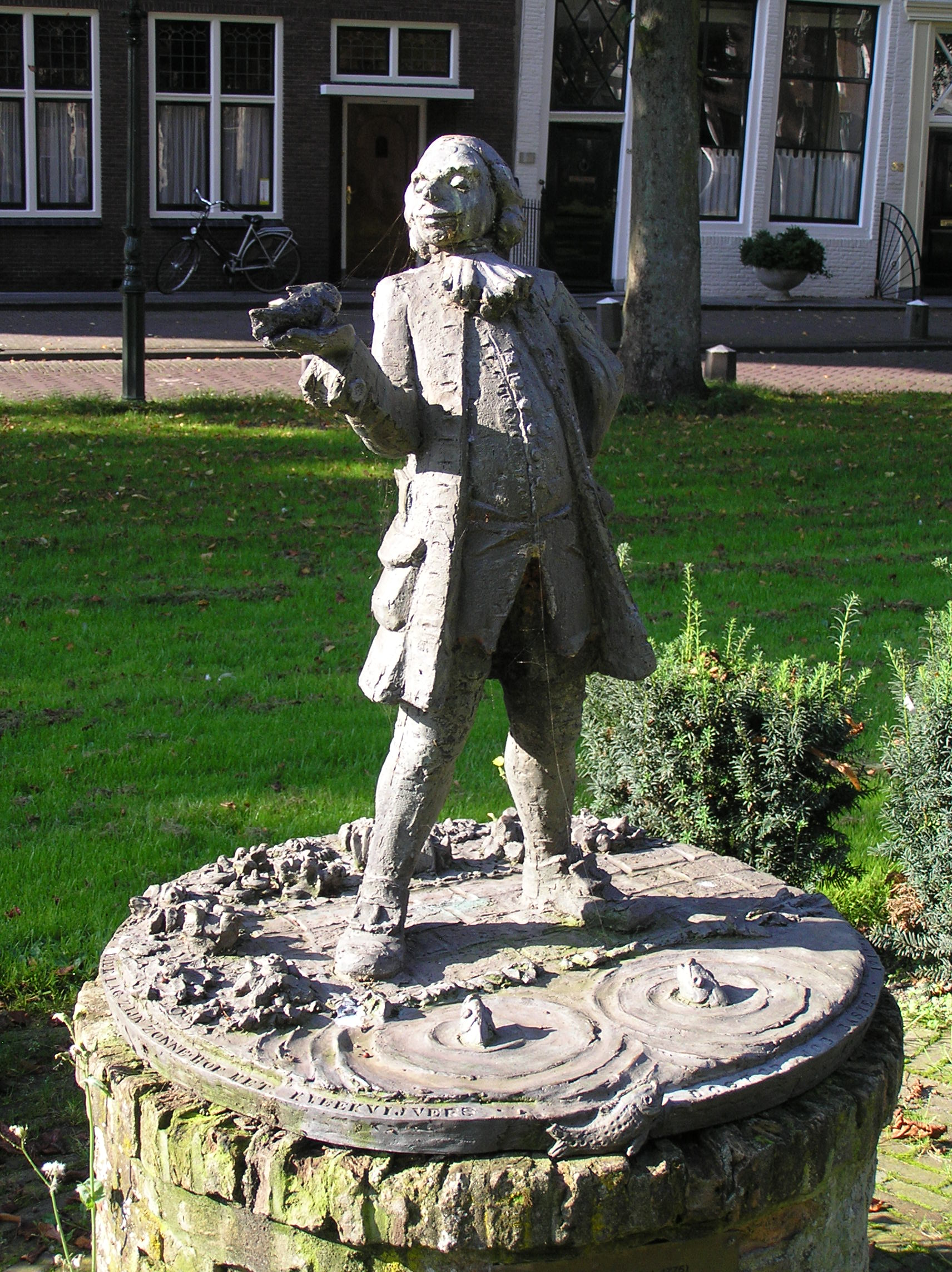
Job Baster

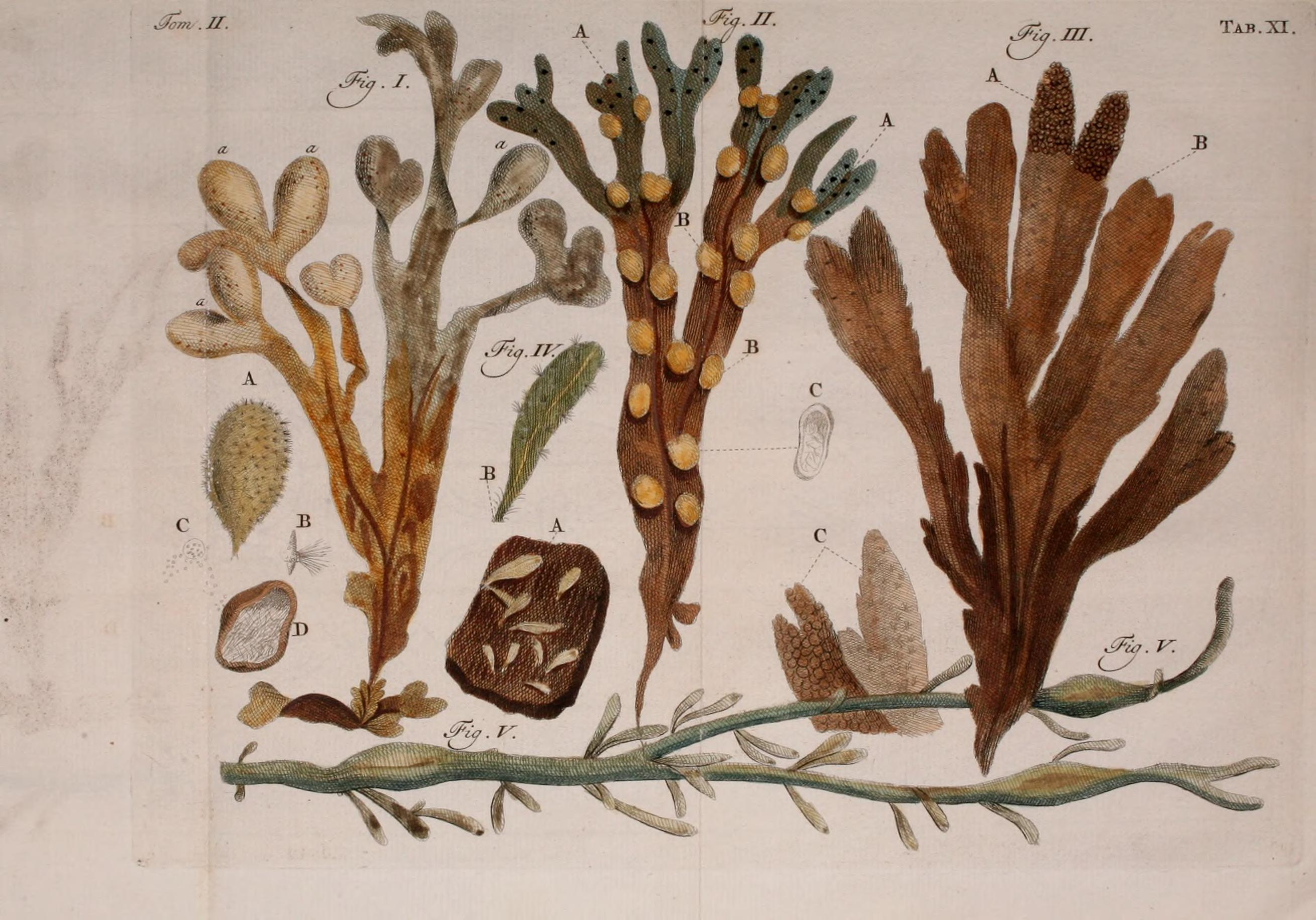
Opuscula subseciva.

Job Baster, sometimes Hiob Baster, (2 April 1711, in Zierikzee – 6 March 1775) was a Dutch physician and naturalist who devoted himself almost entirely to the study of medicine and natural history.

He studied and took his degree of doctor of medicine at Leiden in 1731, and Albrecht von Haller has thought his thesis, De Osteogenia, worthy of a place in his collection. Professors like Herman Boerhaave trained him in scientific methods and he learned to how study natural phenomena. After his study he visited the hospitals and botanical gardens in Paris and London where he became friends with Philip Miller and Hans Sloane. Afterwards he settled as a physician in his native town Zierikzee.

In 1738 he became a Fellow of the Royal Society in London on recommendation of Boerhaave and Willem 'sGravesande. Baster was a versatile scientist, in addition to his work as a physician he contributed papers about medicine, horticulture and marine biology to the Philosophical Transactions and the Verhandelingen der Hollandsche Maatschappij der Wetenschappen. He also maintained a vast correspondence with leading biologists of his time. In Holland he was famous for his introduction of the goldfish (Kin-Yu) and his translation of Philip Miller's work on horticulture.

== Works ==
=== Natuurlijke Uitspanningen ===
In 1759 he published his most famous multivolume book: Natuurlyke Uitspanningen behelzende eenige waarnemingen over sommige zee-planten en zee-insecten (Natural accounts about some observations of some marine plants and insects). In the first two volumes of this work he contributes to the discussion if organisms on the bottom of the sea were merely animals, plants or, as Carl Linnaeus thought, zoophytes (plant-animals). His theory about this subject was, not onrightfully, fiercely opposed by John Ellis (naturalist). Happily Baster continued to work on this beautifully illustrated book on marine fauna at the Dutch coast. He was the first author to describe and illustrate the medusas of hydropolyps and eggs and larvae of many mollusc species. In 1765, he had to end his marine investigations because at the age of 53 he had become blind in his left eye.
