= Sidonia Hedwig Zäunemann =

German poet of the 18th century

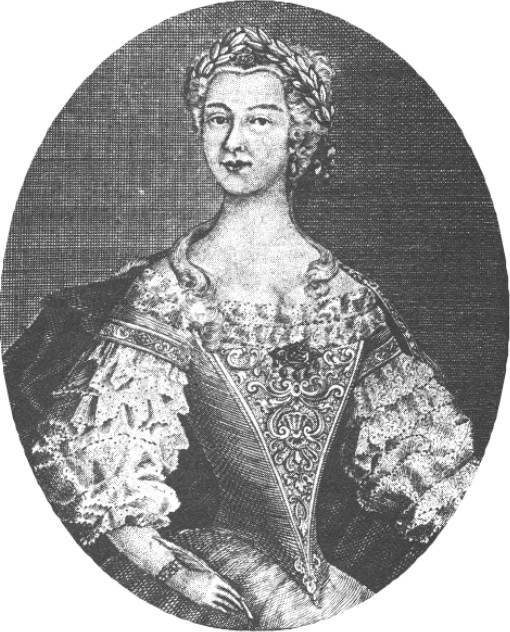
Sidonia Hedwig Zäunemann

Sidonia Hedwig Zäunemann (15 January 1711 – 11 December 1740), known as die Zäunemännin, was a German poet. Zäunemann was inspired by the example of Christiana Mariana von Ziegler. She became Poet Laureate of Göttingen at the age of twenty-four.

== Selected works ==
- Das Ilmenauische Bergwerk ... (The Mine at Ilmenau) (1737)
