= Battle of Helsingborg =

1710 battle of the Great Northern War in Helsingborg, Sweden

Coordinates: 56°3′55″N 12°42′2″E

- Part of the Great Northern War
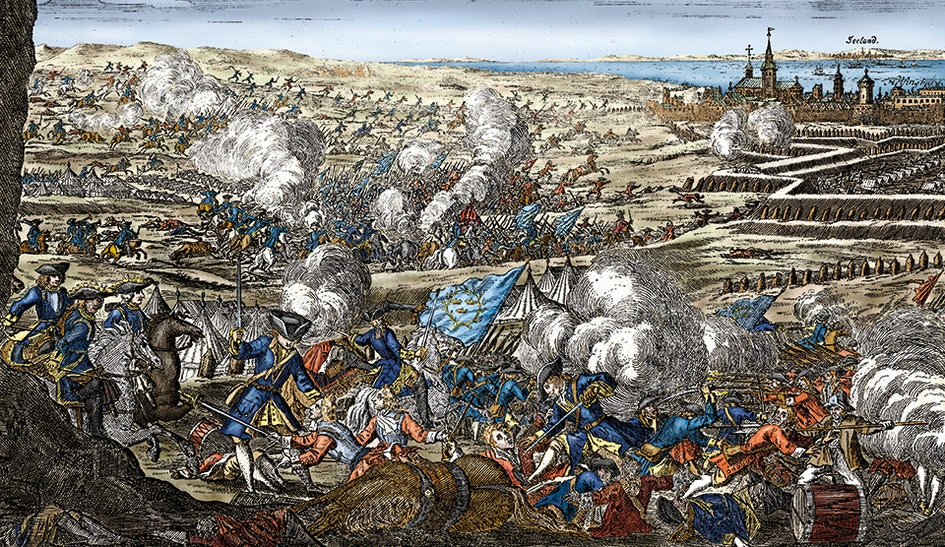
- German engraving depicting the battle. (Military Archives of Sweden)
Date	27 February 1710 (O.S.); 28 February 1710 (Swedish); 10 March 1710 (N.S.)
Location	Helsingborg, Scania, Sweden
Result	Swedish victory
Territorial changes	Denmark evacuates Scania

Belligerents
Swedish Empire	Denmark–Norway

Commanders and leaders
Magnus Stenbock	Jørgen Rantzau

Strength
14,000	14,000

Casualties and losses
2,995 killed and wounded	5,000 killed and wounded 2,677 captured

The Battle of Helsingborg was the last major engagement of the Great Northern War to take place on Swedish soil. It resulted in a decisive victory of a Swedish force of 14,000 men under the command of Magnus Stenbock against a Danish force of equal strength under the command of Jørgen Rantzau, ensuring that Denmark's final effort to regain the Scanian territories that it had lost to Sweden in 1658 failed. The battle was fought on 10 March 1710 (N.S.) in the province of Scania, just outside the city of Helsingborg, and directly on the Ringstorp heights just north-east of the city.

Denmark–Norway had been forced out of the Great Northern War by the Treaty of Traventhal in 1700, but had long planned on reopening hostilities with the goal of reconquering the lost provinces of Scania, Halland and Blekinge. After the Swedish defeat at Poltava in 1709, the Danes saw an opportunity and declared war on Sweden the same year. The declaration of war arrived at the Swedish state council on 18 October 1709. The pretext given was that Sweden had been intentionally trying to avoid paying the Sound Dues, and that the population of Scania, Halland, Blekinge and Bohuslän had been mistreated by the Swedish.

In January 1710, the Danish invasion force defeated a smaller Swedish force outside Kristianstad in a small skirmish. On 10 March 1710, the Danish force finally engaged the Swedish army, which had been hastily drafted from the surrounding regions to try to resist the Danes. The Swedish cavalry carried the day during the engagement, with the Danish lines crumbling and retreating under repeated charges. The battle proved to be a total rout for the Danes, with more than half of their force killed, wounded, or captured. The battle ended any hopes for the Scanian territories to return to Danish rule, and the territories became a permanent part of Sweden.

== Background ==
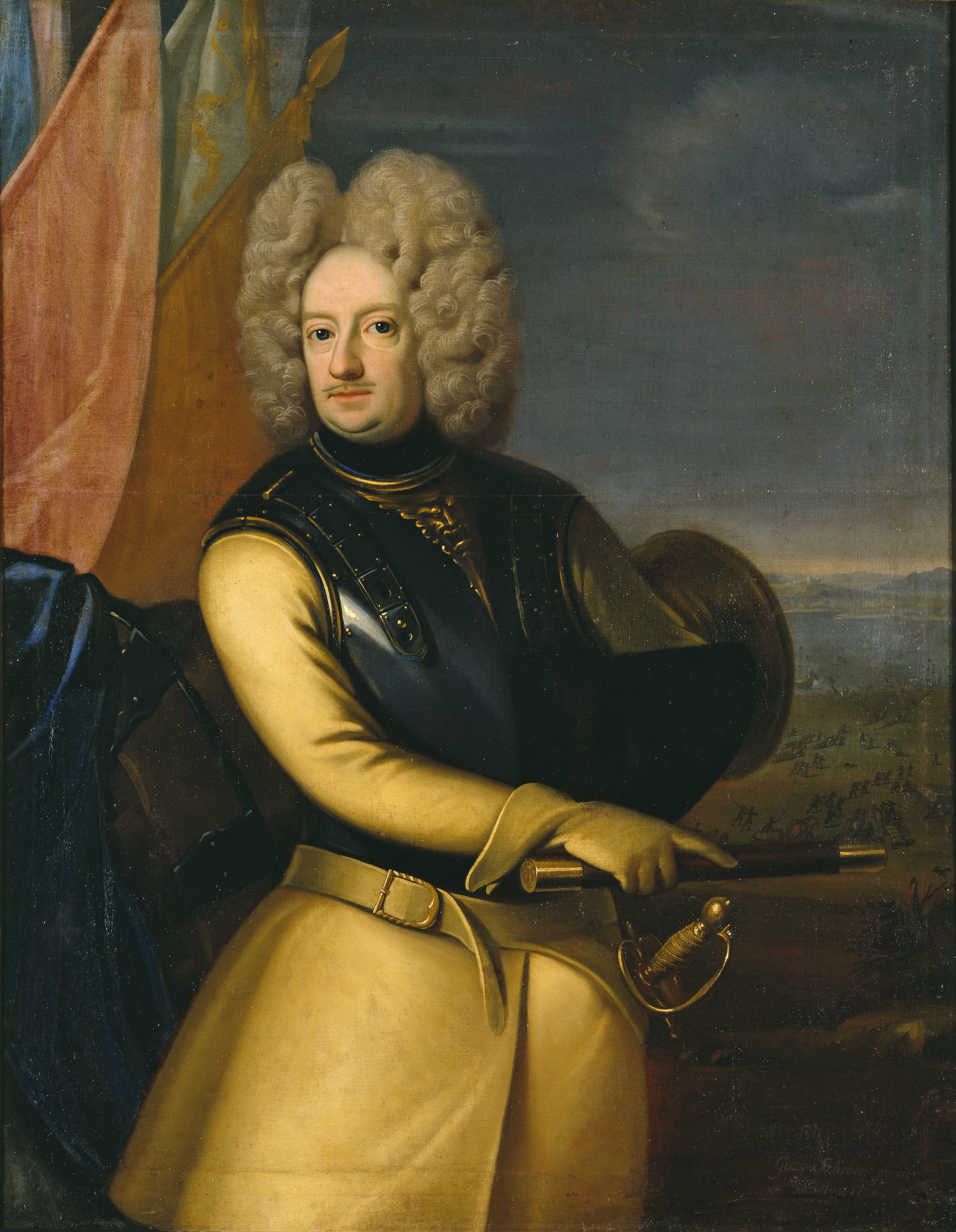
A portrait of Magnus Stenbock, by Georg Engelhard Schröder.

In late autumn 1709 an enormous Danish fleet gathered in Øresund, and on 2 November it arrived at Råå. The Danish invasion force was led by general Christian Ditlev Reventlow and consisted of 15,000 men divided into six cavalry regiments, four dragoon regiments, eight infantry regiments and six artillery companies. It was met with virtually no resistance from the Swedes. The Swedish army was in terrible shape after Poltava, when several regiments had been completely annihilated. The work on reconstructing and recruiting the regiments had begun immediately after Poltava, but by late summer 1709, general Magnus Stenbock only had one Scanian line regiment in battle-ready condition. The Swedish counterattack would have to wait and the army retreated into Småland. At the beginning of December, the Danes controlled almost all of central Scania except for Landskrona and Malmö. Their objective was to capture the naval base at Karlskrona in Blekinge, and the Danish army advanced quickly into Swedish territory. In January 1710, it defeated a smaller Swedish force in a skirmish outside Kristianstad.

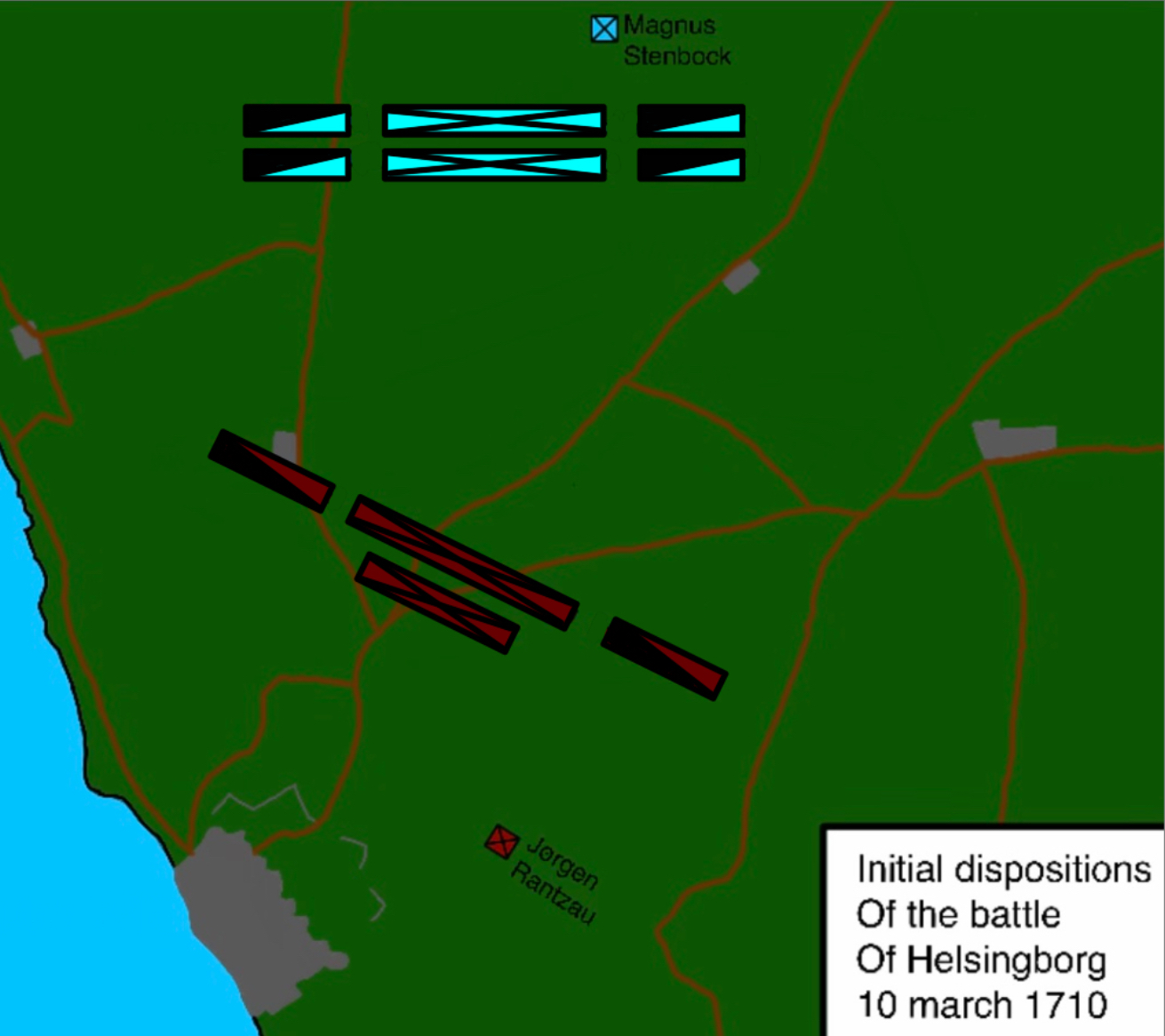
Initial dispositions of the battle of Helsingborg

Stenbock had frantically tried to assemble a new army and several fresh regiments had begun to assemble in Växjö, from where Stenbock had planned to march. The raw recruits were exercised daily on a frozen lake close to the city. By 5 February Stenbock had moved his force to Osby, where additional regiments joined them. By now, about 14,000 men were part of his army. Helsingborg was the key to Scania and Stenbock intended on marching through Rönneå to Kävlingeån, in doing so cutting off the Danish supply lines. The Danish commander, Reventlow, saw the threat and turned immediately to meet the Swedes, but when they reached Ringsjön in central Skåne, Reventlow was suddenly struck down with illness and had to yield command of his army to lieutenant-general Jørgen Rantzau. Rantzau feared being wedged between the main Swedish army and the Swedish garrison in Malmö and therefore moved towards Helsingborg. Once in the city, Rantzau could be reinforced and when he camped his force amounted to 10,000 foot soldiers and 4,000 horsemen. Stenbock received the news of the Danish march and raced towards Helsingborg. On the night of 28 February, he camped northeast of the city. The Swedish army was at the time roughly as large as the Danish army.

== Battle ==
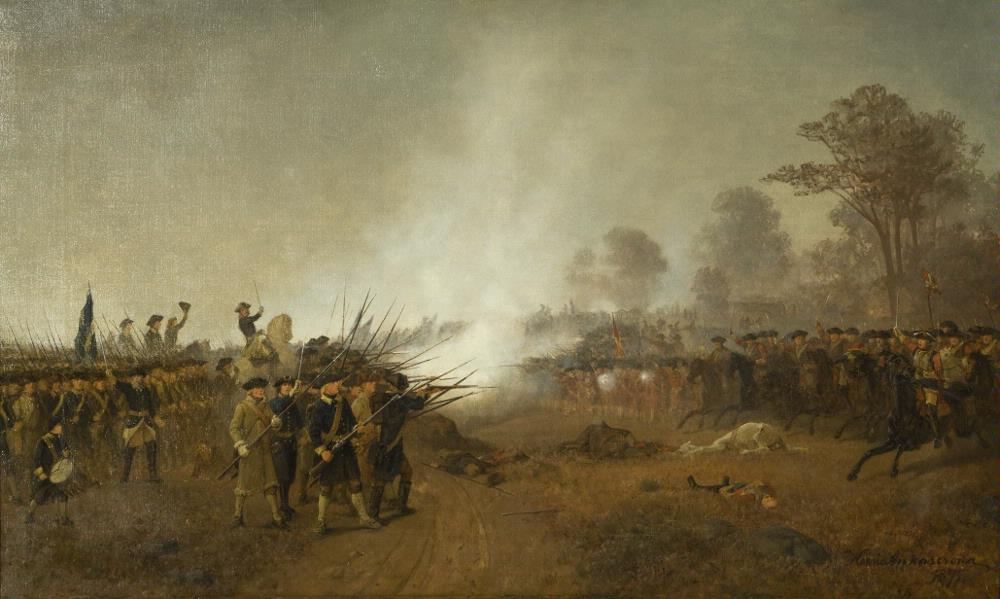
Stenbock's shepherds at the Battle of Helsingborg by Henrik Ankarcrona

On the morning of 28 February Stenbock marched south towards Helsingborg. When he approached the Danish positions he ordered his army to assume battle formations. A thick morning fog lay over the area and hid the two parties from seeing each other. When the fog lifted the two commanders reviewed the terrain and the position of their respective armies. Rantzau saw that the Swedish army outflanked his own left flank in the west and was forced to dispatch troops to reinforce it quickly. Rantzau had deployed his artillery on the Ringstorp heights, from where they started firing at the Swedish troops at noon. Instead of exploiting the comparatively weak Danish west flank, Stenbock turned his army eastward to the Danish right flank. This was perceived by the Danes as an attempt to encircle their eastern flank, and to prevent this they marched further east, opening up gaps in the Danish line of battle that could not be filled by reserve troops. In the east, near Brohuset, the first skirmishes of the battle took place. The Swedes were repelled there and the Swedish commander, Burenskiöld, was captured. However, the rest of the Swedish east flank was able to force the Danes backwards and soon the Danish forces were at a disadvantage. Rantzau participated in the fighting personally, disregarding the direction the battle was going in, and was eventually wounded by a bullet through the lung. At the same time a rumor developed in the Danish east flank that the Swedes had encircled them and were attacking from behind, which caused the entire formation to collapse with the troops fleeing towards Helsingborg.

Rantzau's disappearance from the field became noticeable in the middle of the Danish line of battle upon which the Swedish forces had begun to focus their attack. The Danes had great difficulties withstanding the assault, and as the Danish troops saw how their eastern flank was faring, the middle started to collapse due to Swedish pressure. The elite Danish household guards and a corps of grenadiers were deployed on the edges of the line of battle, and could have prevented the Swedish advance long enough to allow other forces to pull back in good order, but many of the routing troops were cut down by the Swedish cavalry through repeated charges. At this point in the battle, the Swedes attacked the gap that had formed between the Danish center and its western flank. Here too the Danes had no leadership, since their commander, von Dewitz had been ordered to move towards the eastern side of battle. The Swedish cavalry chased off the Danes present and surrounded the remaining grenadiers. The other elite force the Danes had at their disposal, the household guards, had already been forced to retire and the situation became untenable for the Danes. Danish Major-General Valentin von Eickstedt ordered a general retreat, and the Danes quickly fled from the battlefield, bringing the battle to an end.

== Aftermath ==
The remainder of the Danish army, severely depleted from the engagement that had left them with 1,500 men killed, 3,500 men wounded and 2,677 men captured, sought refuge within the walls of Helsingborg. Stenbock avoided attacking them in a head-on assault as they had too advantageous a position to successfully take the city without suffering heavy casualties. Instead, he laid siege to the city and invited the Danes to capitulate, but the offer was dismissed by von Dewitz. A Swedish council of war determined that their army was too weak to storm the city, and instead started an artillery bombardment of the city. By 5 March the last remains of the Danish army left Scania after intentionally slaughtering all their horses and sabotaging their cannons by spiking them. The Danes lost over 7,500 men, who had been either killed, wounded, or captured. The Swedish losses amounted to 2,800 dead or wounded. The Danish army left Scania, never to return. The city of Helsingborg was hit hard by the battle, due both to the Swedish bombardment which destroyed its buildings, and all the remaining human and horse cadavers poisoning the wells. A plague epidemic then harrowed the town and further reduced its population. Helsingborg did not recover until the middle of the 19th century.

After Stenbock's victory at Helsingborg, a heroic cult began to grow around him in the Swedish Empire. He received personal congratulations from the Queen Dowager Hedvig Eleonora, Princess Ulrika Eleonora, Duke Charles Frederick of Holstein-Gottorp, King Stanisław Leszczyński of Poland and the Duke of Marlborough. Throughout the kingdom, Stenbock's victory was celebrated with tributes, writings and artistic works, and a general thanksgiving ceremony was held on 18 March, where Stenbock's name was praised. In April, Stenbock traveled to Stockholm to inform the Privy Council about the new strategic situation. On arrival, he was hailed by the citizens of Stockholm and he held several victory speeches before the clergy and peasant estates. The Riksdag of the Estates offered him the Bååtska palace, and on 21 May the Privy Council appointed him field marshal, sending the letter of appointment to Charles XII in Bender for the King's signature, which came shortly after. The battle marked the end of any realistic hopes for Denmark to recover the Scanian territories, and they have remained part of Sweden ever since.

== See also ==
- Great Northern War
- Battle of Helsingborg (1362)
- Magnus Stenbock

== Bibliography ==
- Lars, Ericson (2003). Svenska slagfält. Wahlström & Widstrand. ISBN 9146210873.
- Marklund, Andreas (2008). Stenbock: honor and solitude in the age of Charles. Historiska media. ISBN 9789185377640.
- Eriksson, Ingvar (2007). Carolean Magnus Stenbock. Atlantis. ISBN 9789173531580.
