= Jean Le Pelletier =

French polygraph and alchemist (1633 - 1711)

Jean Le Pelletier (29 December 1633 – 31 August 1711) was a French polygraph and alchemist.

== Biography ==
Le Pelletier was a merchant and a judge-consul in Rouen, but he was interested consecutively in painting, pedagogy, modern language, mathematics, architecture, astronomy, medicine and economy.

He was the author of several books on alchemistry and translated in French George Starkey's Pyrotechny asserted and illustrated. He wrote an Essay on Noah's ark.

Le Pelletier died in Rouen in 1711.

== Quotation ==
Jean Le Pelletier is quoted by Gaston Bachelard in his book The Formation of the Scientific Mind (La formation de l'esprit scientifique).

== Works ==
- Translation in French of Gregorio Leti's Historia, e memorie recondite sopra alla vita de Oliviero Cromvele: detto il tiranno senza vizi, il prencipe senza virtù.
- Translation in French of Gregorio Leti's Historia o vero vita di Elisabetta, regina d'Inghilterra: Detta per soprannome la Commediante Politica.
- Dissertations sur l'arche de Noé et sur l'hémine et la livre de S. Benoist.
- Starkey, George; Le Pelletier, Jean (1706). La pyrotecnie de Starkey, ou L'art de volatiliser les alcalis (in French). Rouen: Guillaume Behoult.
