= 1628 =

1628 in various calendars
- Gregorian calendar: 1628; MDCXXVIII
- Ab urbe condita: 2381
- Armenian calendar: 1077; ԹՎ ՌՀԷ
- Assyrian calendar: 6378
- Balinese saka calendar: 1549–1550
- Bengali calendar: 1034–1035
- Berber calendar: 2578
- English Regnal year: 3 Cha. 1 – 4 Cha. 1
- Buddhist calendar: 2172
- Burmese calendar: 990
- Byzantine calendar: 7136–7137
- Chinese calendar: 丁卯年 (Fire Rabbit); 4325 or 4118 — to — 戊辰年 (Earth Dragon); 4326 or 4119
- Coptic calendar: 1344–1345
- Discordian calendar: 2794
- Ethiopian calendar: 1620–1621
- Hebrew calendar: 5388–5389
- Hindu calendars
- Vikram Samvat: 1684–1685
- Shaka Samvat: 1549–1550
- Kali Yuga: 4728–4729
- Holocene calendar: 11628
- Igbo calendar: 628–629
- Iranian calendar: 1006–1007
- Islamic calendar: 1037–1038
- Japanese calendar: Kan'ei 5 (寛永５年)
- Javanese calendar: 1549–1550
- Julian calendar: Gregorian minus 10 days
- Korean calendar: 3961
- Minguo calendar: 284 before ROC 民前284年
- Nanakshahi calendar: 160
- Thai solar calendar: 2170–2171
- Tibetan calendar: མེ་མོ་ཡོས་ལོ་ (female Fire-Hare); 1754 or 1373 or 601 — to — ས་ཕོ་འབྲུག་ལོ་ (male Earth-Dragon); 1755 or 1374 or 602

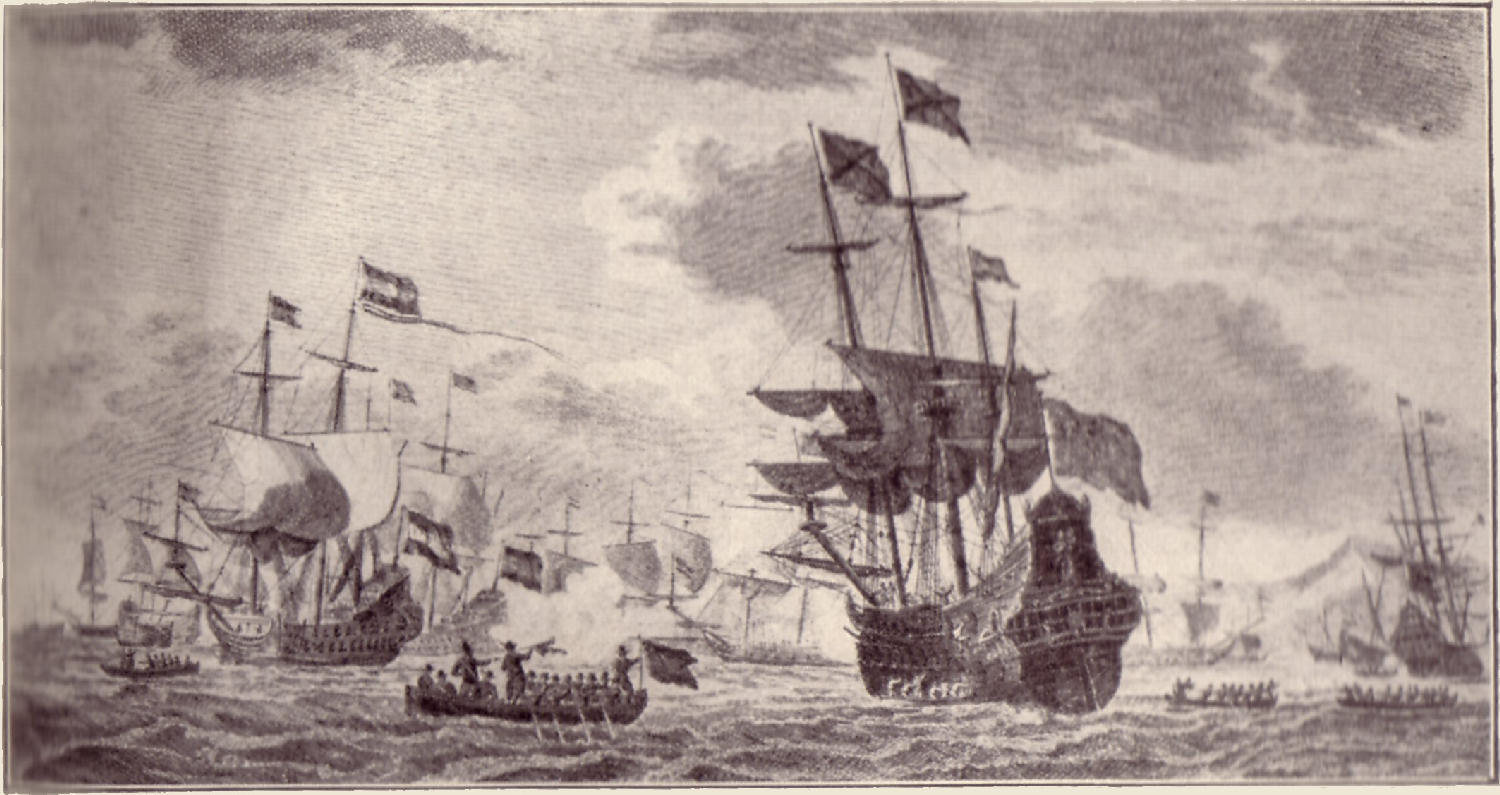
September 8: Dutch admiral Piet Hein captures the Spanish treasure fleet in the Battle in the Bay of Matanzas.

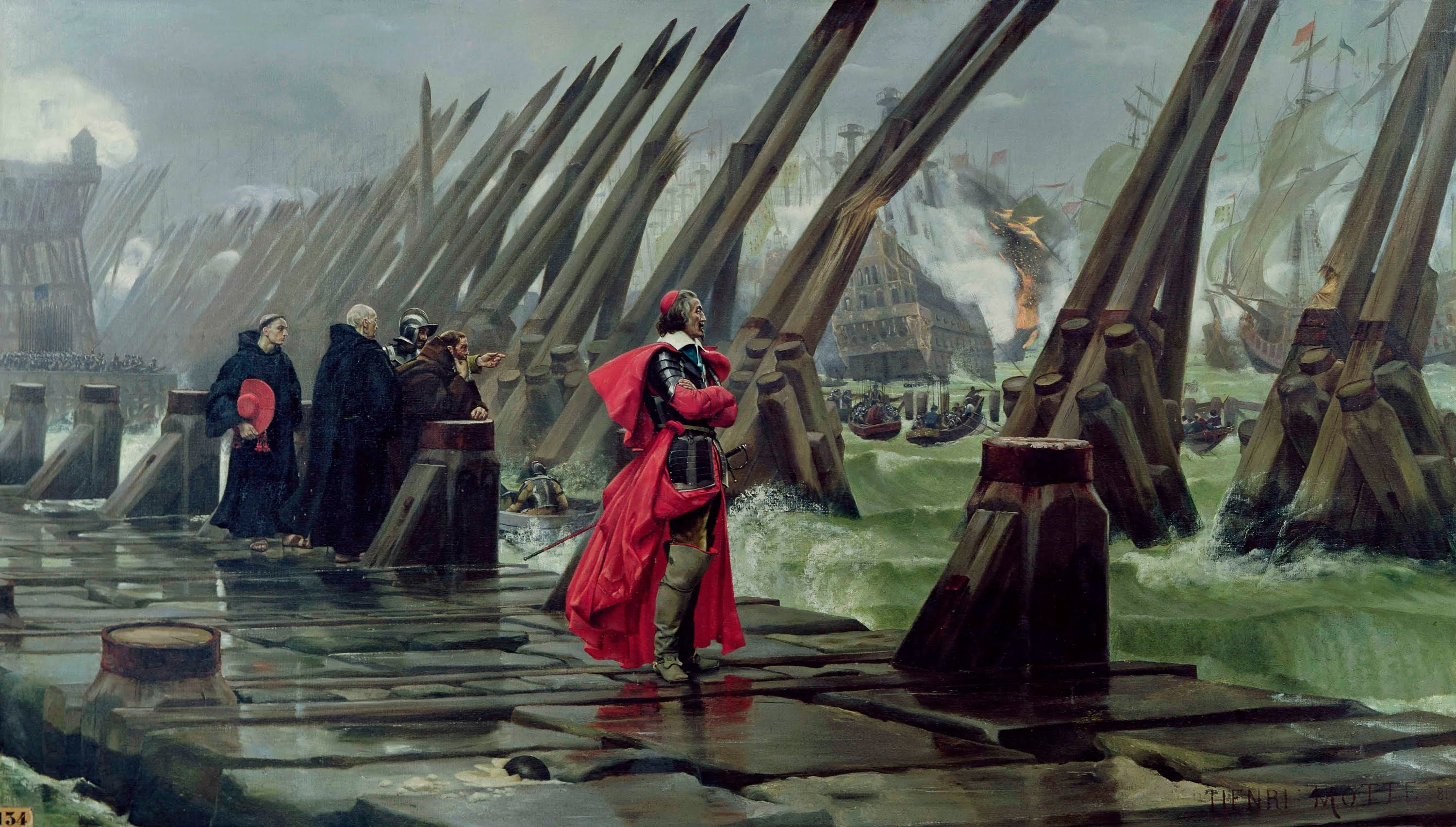
October 28: Cardinal Richelieu at the siege of La Rochelle. Painting by Henri Motte from 1881.

1628 (MDCXXVIII) was a leap year starting on Saturday of the Gregorian calendar and a leap year starting on Tuesday of the Julian calendar, the 1628th year of the Common Era (CE) and Anno Domini (AD) designations, the 628th year of the 2nd millennium, the 28th year of the 17th century, and the 9th year of the 1620s decade. As of the start of 1628, the Gregorian calendar was 10 days ahead of the Julian calendar, which remained in localized use until 1923.

== Events ==
=== January–March ===
- January 19 – (26 Jumada I 1037 A.H.) The reign of Salef-ud-din Muhammad Shahryar as the Mughal Emperor, Shahryar Mirza, comes to an end a little more than two months after the November 7 death of his father, Jahangir, as Sharyar's older brother, Shihab defeats him in battle. Prince Shihab-ud-Din Muhammad Khurram takes the name Shah Jahan and sentences Shahryar and other members of the court to death.
- January 23 – After being incarcerated and blinded on orders of his brother, former Mughal Emperor Shahryar Mirza is put to death, along with his nephews, co-ruler Dawar Bakhsh, and Princes Garshasp, Tahmuras and Hoshang.
- February 3 – In what is now the South American nation of Chile, the indigenous Mapuche lay siege to the Spanish colonial settlement of Nacimiento. The Spanish captain and a force of 40 men are able to hold out until reinforcements arrive two days later, but the attackers take muskets and two cannons.
- February 5 – The Chongzhen Era begins in Ming dynasty China after the October 2 ascension of Zhu Youjian, the Chongzhen Emperor, on the first day of the Chinese New Year, and the Tianqi era formally ends.
- February 10 – King Gustavus Adolphus of Sweden issues an order bringing an end to the "foolishness and insanity" ("dårskap och galenskap") of religious visionary Margareta i Kumla, prohibiting Swedes from making pilgrimages to see her on pain of imprisonment, and threatening her with incarceration if she continues to preach about her visions from the angels.
- February 14 – The coronation of Shah Jahan as ruler of the Mughal Empire takes place in Agra.
- March 1 – Writs issued in February, by King Charles I, require every county in England (not just seaport towns) to pay ship tax by this date.
- March 17 – Oliver Cromwell makes his first appearance in the English Parliament, as Member for Huntingdon.

=== April–June ===
- April 6 – Damat Halil Pasha is fired from his position as Grand Vizier of the Ottoman Empire by Sultan Murad IV after failing again to suppress the rebellion started by Abaza Mehmed Pasha or to win the war of the Ottomans against Persia. Halil is replaced by Gazi Hüsrev Pasha.
- April 8 – A decree of the Sacred Congregation of Rites of the Roman Catholic Church is made to prohibit the veneration of saints whose sanctity has not been declared by the Holy See.
- April 21 – Generalissimo Albrecht von Wallenstein of the Holy Roman Empire is made Admiral of the Baltic Sea by Emperor Ferdinand II.
- April 26 – Cardinal Girolamo Grimaldi-Cavalleroni is appointed as the Governor of Rome by Pope Urban VIII.
- May 5 – Catholic League Field Marshal Johann Tserclaes, Count of Tilly, succeeds in taking control of the German city of Stade after a long siege. Tilly allows the remaining 3,500 Danish and English defenders safe passage out of Germany, and captures most of the Duchy of Bremen except for the city of Bremen itself, which he turns to next.
- May 13
  - In North America, Matthew Cradock is elected by shareholders as the first Governor of the Massachusetts Bay Company.
  - Thirty Years' War: As a result of its refusal to accept the capitulation of Franzburg, the siege of Stralsund is begun by Field Marshals Hans Georg von Arnim-Boitzenburg and Wallenstein's of the Holy Roman Imperial Army, and lasts until August 4.
- May 21 – (17 Ramadan 1037 AH) Muhsin ibn Husayn, Emir of Mecca and King of Hejaz, surrenders control to Ahmad ibn Abd al-Muttalib.
- May 31 – Mehmed III Giray, the Khan of Crimea, is forced to leave after an invasion of 4,000 Cossacks and a four week siege of the capital Bakhchysarai. The attack is led by Mykhailo Doroshenko, who is killed in the battle.
- June 7 – King Charles I reconvenes the English Parliament, and accepts the Petition of Right as a concession to gain his subsidies.

=== July–September ===
- July 9 – Prince Minyedeippa assassinates his father, Anaukpetlun, King of Burma and takes over the throne upon the death of his father. Minyedeippa is arrested by the palace guards a year later and turned over to Anaukpetlun's brother, Thalun, for execution.
- August 4 – Thirty Years' War: With the help of Danish and Swedish reinforcements, Stralsund is able to resist Wallenstein's siege until the landing of a Danish army, led by Christian IV of Denmark, forces Wallenstein to raise the siege, and move his army to confront the new threat.
- August 10 – The Swedish 64-gun sailing ship Vasa sinks 20 minutes into her maiden voyage, in Stockholm Harbor.
- August 22 – Sultan Agung of Mataram (located on the island of Java sends a fleet of ships to besiege the Dutch fort at Batavia (now Jakarta, Indonesia). The siege fails after four months.
- August 23 – English courtier George Villiers, the first Duke of Buckingham, is assassinated by John Felton.
- September 2 – Thirty Years' War – Battle of Wolgast: Wallenstein defeats Christian IV of Denmark's army.
- September 6 – Puritans settle Salem, which will later become part of Massachusetts Bay Colony.
- September 7–8 – Eighty Years' War – Battle in the Bay of Matanzas: Dutch admiral Piet Hein captures 16 ships of the Spanish treasure fleet. The immense booty taken brings in over 11 million guilders, part of which is used to fund the entire army of the Dutch Republic for eight months.
- September 8 – In a persecution of Christians in Japan, 21 Christian converts are executed on the same day.

=== October–December ===
- October 22 – Abaza Mehmed Pasha surrenders to Ottoman forces, ending the Abaza rebellion.
- October 28 – The siege of La Rochelle ends with the surrender of the Huguenots.
- November 29 – English Army Lieutenant John Felton, who stabbed the Duke of Buckingham to death on August 23, is hanged at Tyburn prison.
- December 3 – The attempt by the Mataram Sultanate to drive the Dutch East India Company from the western part of the island of Java fails after 103 days.
- December 11 – Muhammad Imaduddin I becomes the Sultan of Maldives and reigns for the next 29 years.
- December 12 – At the age of 15, Chetthathirat is crowned as the new King of Thailand upon the death of his father, Intharacha III. Prince Chetthathirat takes the regnal name of Borommaracha II and is killed less than a year later.
- December 16 – In the Joseon Kingdom of Korea, O Yun-gyeom becomes the new Yeonguijeong (Chief of the State Council, similar to Prime Minister) during the reign of King Injo.

=== Date unknown ===
- The War of the Mantuan Succession breaks out over Mantua and Montferrat. The war is fought between the Duke of Savoy, who is supported by Spain, and the Duke of Nevers, who is supported by France.
- William Harvey publishes Exercitatio Anatomica de Motu Cordis et Sanguinis in Animalibus in Frankfurt, containing his findings about blood circulation.
- Publication of Sir Edward Coke's Institutes of the Lawes of England begins with A Commentary upon Littleton. This will remain an influential legal text on both sides of the Atlantic for three centuries.
- The Collegiate School, the oldest surviving educational institution in the United States, is established.
- The first black slaves arrive in Dutch Manhattan.

== Births ==
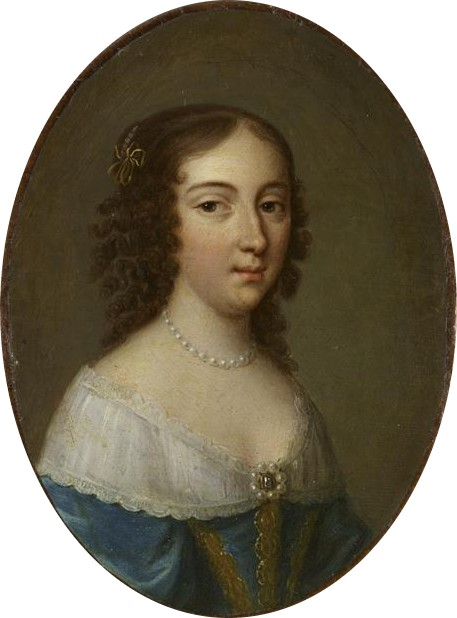
Claire-Clémence de Maillé-Brézé

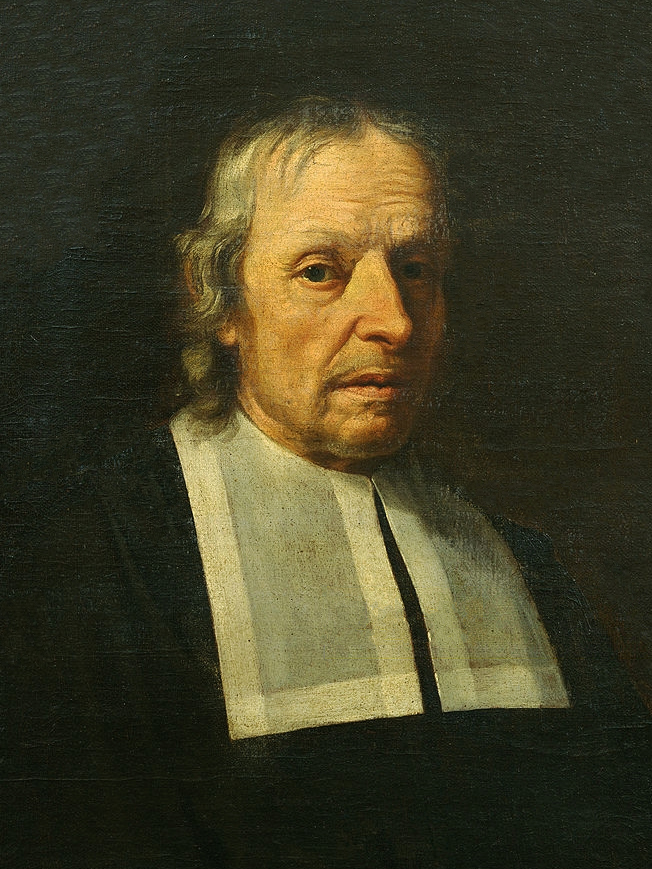
Marcello Malpighi

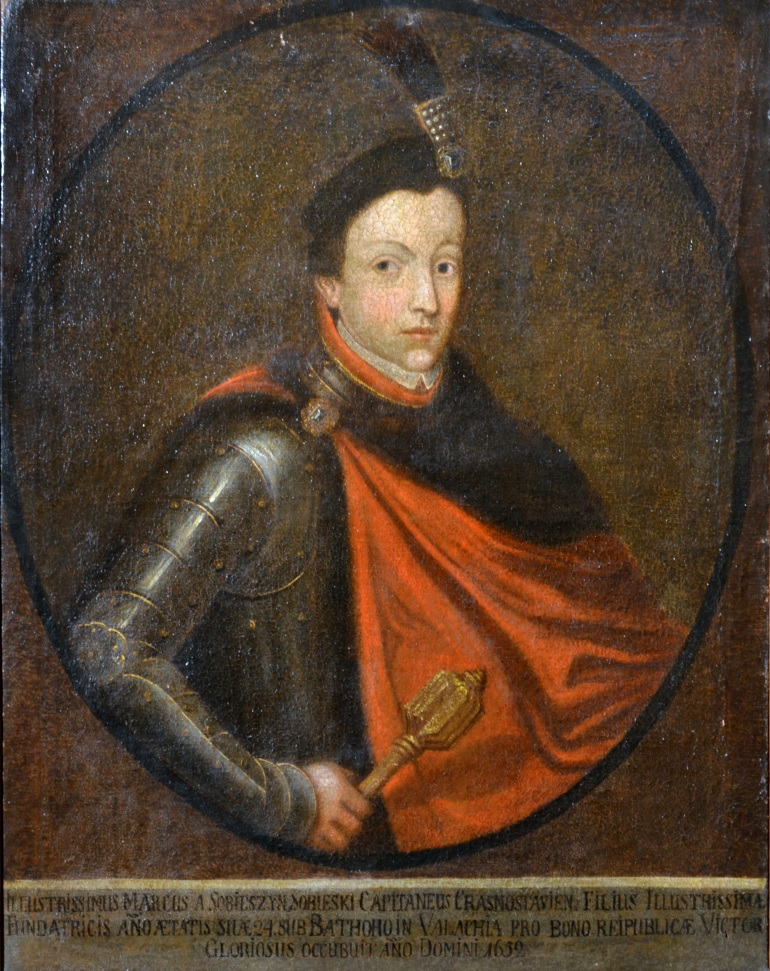
Marek Sobieski

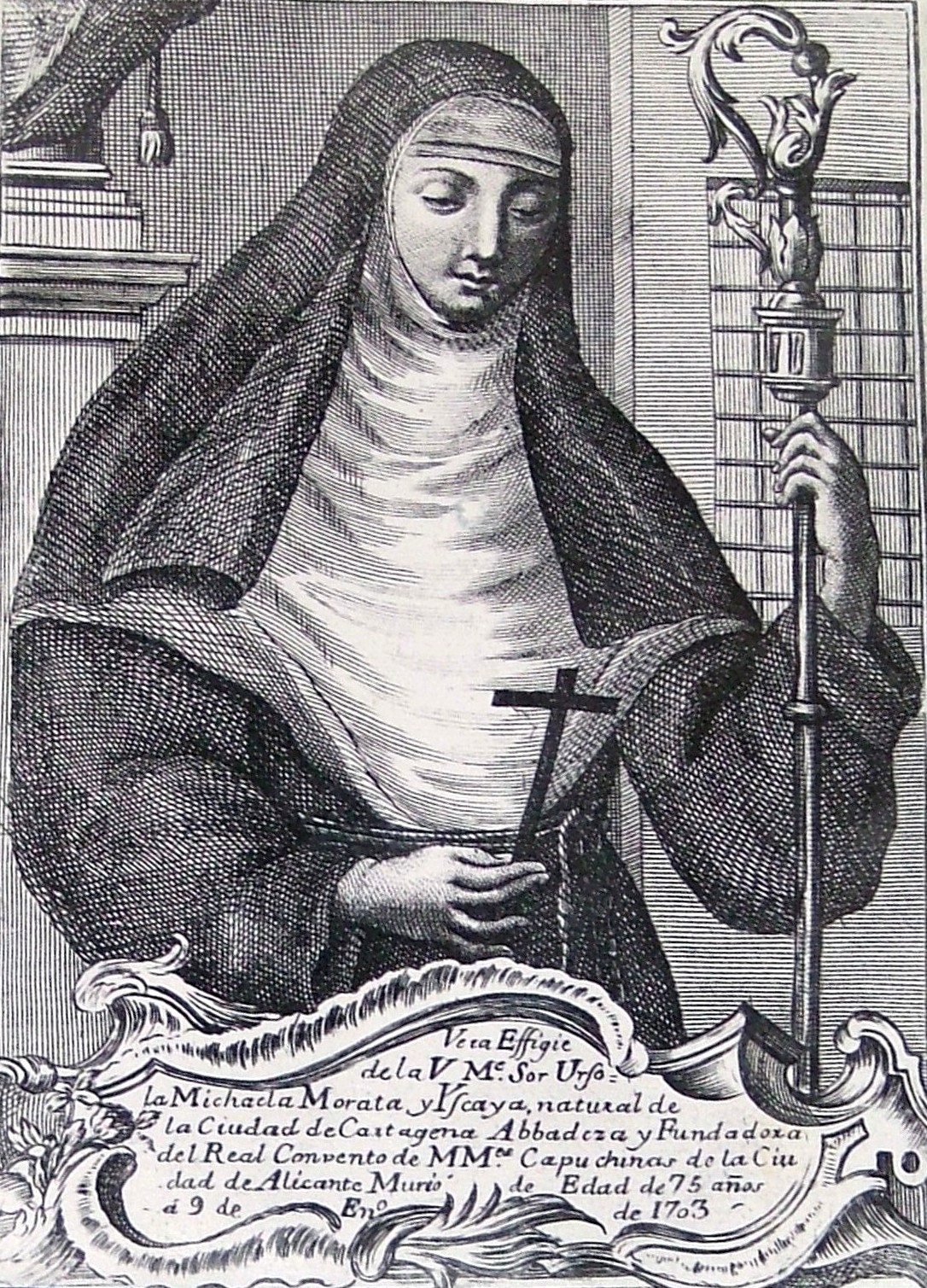
Úrsula Micaela Morata

=== January–March ===
- January 1 – Christoph Bernhard, German composer (d. 1692)
- January 3 – Alvise II Mocenigo, Doge of Venice (d. 1709)
- January 8 – François-Henri de Montmorency, duc de Luxembourg, French general (d. 1695)
- January 10
  - John Bennet, English landowner and politician (d. 1663)
  - Jan Theunisz Blanckerhoff, Dutch Golden Age marine painter (d. 1669)
- January 12 – Charles Perrault, French folklorist (d. 1703)
- January 14 – Sir Roger Bradshaigh, 1st Baronet, English politician (d. 1684)
- January 19 – Charles Stanley, 8th Earl of Derby, English noble (d. 1672)
- January 20 – Henry Cromwell, 4th son of Oliver Cromwell and Elizabeth Bourchier (d. 1674)
- January 23 – Johann Reinhard II, Count of Hanau-Lichtenberg, German aristocrat (d. 1666)
- January 30 – George Villiers, 2nd Duke of Buckingham, English statesman (d. 1687)
- February 1 – Jan Hackaert, Dutch painter (d. 1685)
- February 5 – César d'Estrées, French Catholic cardinal (d. 1714)
- February 14 – Valentine Greatrakes, Irish faith healer (d. 1682)
- February 24 – Paolo Spinola, 3rd Marquis of the Balbases and 3rd Duke of San Severino and Sesto (d. 1699)
- February 25 – Claire-Clémence de Maillé-Brézé, French noblewoman (d. 1694)
- March 2 – Cornelis Speelman, Governor-General of the Dutch East Indies (d. 1684)
- March 10
  - Marcello Malpighi, Italian biologist and physician (d. 1694)
  - François Girardon, French sculptor (d. 1715)
- March 12 – Jacques Frémin, French Jesuit missionary to Canada (d. 1691)
- March 17 – Daniel Papebroch, Flemish Jesuit hagiographer (d. 1714)
- March 20 – Sir John Hobart, 3rd Baronet, English landowner and politician (d. 1683)
- March 24 – Sophie Amalie of Brunswick-Lüneburg (d. 1685)

=== April–June ===
- April 2 – Constantin Christian Dedekind, German poet, dramatist and composer (d. 1715)
- April 16 – Cornelis Evertsen the Younger, Dutch admiral (d. 1679)
- April 22 – Georg Matthäus Vischer, Austrian cartographer (d. 1696)
- April 23
  - Johann van Waveren Hudde, Dutch mathematician (d. 1704)
  - Johannes Hudde, burgomaster (mayor) of Amsterdam (d. 1704)
- April 24 – William Beecher, English politician (d. 1694)
- April 25 – Sir William Temple, 1st Baronet, English statesman and essayist (d. 1699)
- May 7 – Étienne Le Hongre, French sculptor (d. 1690)
- May 8 – Angelo Italia, Sicilian Jesuit architect (d. 1700)
- May 9 – Sir William Gardiner, 1st Baronet, English Member of Parliament (d. 1691)
- May 15
  - Dominique Bouhours, French Jesuit priest (d. 1702)
  - Carlo Cignani, Italian painter of the Bolognese and the Forlivese school (d. 1719)
- May 17 – Ferdinand Charles, Archduke of Austria (d. 1662)
- May 24 – Marek Sobieski, Polish noble (szlachcic) (d. 1652)
- June 1 – John Dugdale, English herald in the College of Arms (d. 1700)
- June 4 – Christopher Delphicus zu Dohna, Swedish diplomat (d. 1668)
- June 5 – Arthur Sparke, English lawyer and politician (d. 1677)
- June 15 – Walter Marshall, British theologian (d. 1680)
- June 21 – Alexander Parker, English Quaker preacher and author (d. 1689)
- June 30 – Miguel de Molinos, Spanish mystic (d. 1696)

=== July–September ===
- July 11 – Tokugawa Mitsukuni, Japanese warlord (d. 1701)
- July 12 – Henry Howard, 6th Duke of Norfolk (d. 1684)
- July 17 – Richard Powle, English politician (d. 1678)
- August 12 – Gabriel Gerberon, French Jansenist monk (d. 1711)
- August 20 – Emmanuel Philibert, Prince of Carignano, Prince of Savoy (d. 1709)
- August 29
  - Jan Pieter Brueghel, Flemish Baroque painter (d. 1664)
  - John Granville, 1st Earl of Bath, English royalist statesman (d. 1701)
- September 7 – Sir William Courtenay, 1st Baronet, English politician (d. 1702)
- September 21 – Barend Graat, Dutch painter (d. 1709)
- September 23 – David Klöcker Ehrenstrahl, German artist (d. 1698)

=== October–December ===
- October 12
  - Hermann of Baden-Baden, Imperial field marshal and president of the Hofkriegsrat (d. 1691)
  - William Christopher of Baden-Baden, margrave of Baden and canon at Cologne (d. 1652)
- October 21 – Úrsula Micaela Morata, Spanish writer (d. 1703)
- October 23 – Henry Eyre, English politician and lawyer (d. 1678)
- October 24 – Lucrezia Barberini, Italian noblewoman (d. 1699)
- November 30 (baptised) – John Bunyan, English writer best known for The Pilgrim's Progress (d. 1688)
- December 2 – Johannes Rothe, Dutch preacher (d. 1702)
- December 10 – Jan Baptist Martin Wans, Flemish painter (d. 1684)
- December 12 – Anna Salome of Manderscheid-Blankenheim, German abbess of Thorn Abbey, later abbess of Essen Abbey (d. 1691)
- December 19 – Charlotte of the Palatinate, German noble (d. 1631)
- December 21 – Samuel Capricornus, Czech composer (d. 1665)
- December 25 – Noël Coypel, French painter (d. 1707)
- December 26 – John Page, American politician (d. 1692)

=== Probable ===
- Josias Fendall, Colonial governor of Maryland (d. 1687)
- Anne Greene, English domestic servant and execution survivor (d. 1659)
- Jacob Isaacksz van Ruisdael, Dutch landscape painter (d. 1682)

== Deaths ==
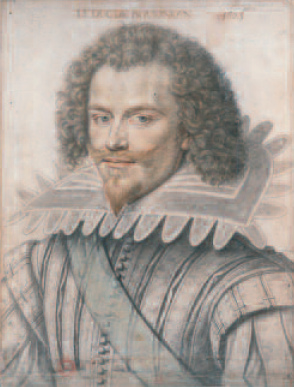
George Villiers, 1st Duke of Buckingham

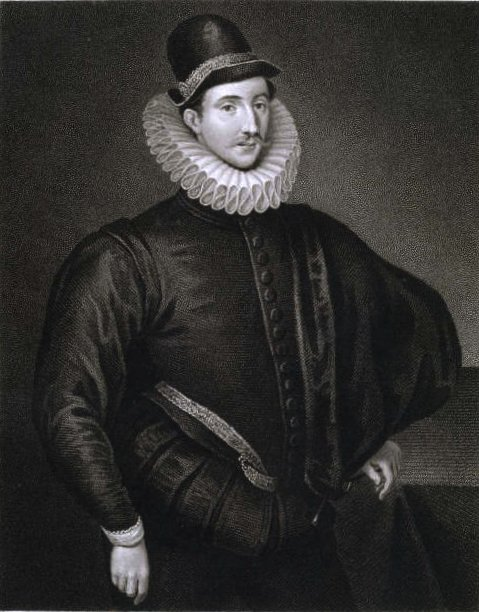
Fulke Greville, 1st Baron Brooke

- January 12 – Francisco Ribalta, Spanish painter (b. 1565)
- January 21 – Gregor Aichinger, German composer (b. c. 1565)
- January 23 – Shahryar, fifth son of the Mughal emperor Jahangir (b. 1605)
- January 29 – Philip Ernest, Count of Hohenlohe-Langenburg (1610–1628) (b. 1584)
- March 12 – John Bull, English composer (b. c. 1562)
- March 29 – Tobias Matthew, English Archbishop of York (b. 1546)
- April 17 – Rudolf Christian, Count of East Frisia, ruler of East Frisia (b. 1602)
- June 8 – Rudolph Goclenius, German philosopher (b. 1547)
- July 11 – David Origanus, German astronomer (b. 1558)
- July 13 – Robert Shirley, English adventurer (b. c. 1581)
- July 18 – John Frederick, Duke of Württemberg (1608–1628) (b. 1582)
- August 6 – Johannes Junius, Mayor of Bamberg, Germany (b. 1573)
- August 20 – Sir Charles Morrison, 1st Baronet, Member of the Parliament of England (b. 1587)
- August 23 – George Villiers, 1st Duke of Buckingham, English statesman (b. 1592)
- September 23 – Amalia von Hatzfeld, Swedish-Finnish governor (b. 1560)
- September 25 – Magdalene of Bavaria, Consort of Wolfgang William, Count Palatine of Neuburg (b. 1587)
- September 30 – Fulke Greville, 1st Baron Brooke, English writer (b. 1554)
- October 16 – François de Malherbe, French poet and critic (b. 1555)
- October 17 – John Frederick, Duke of Saxe-Weimar (b. 1600)
- November 15 – Roque Gonzales, Paraguayan missionary (b. 1576)
- November 16 – Paolo Quagliati, Italian composer (b. c. 1555)
