= Coquet =

Coquet may refer to:

- a flirtatious female

== Places ==
- River Coquet, a river of Northumberland
- Coquet Island

== People ==
- Amélie Coquet (born 1984), French football player
- Ernie Coquet (1883–1946), English football full-back
- Henry of Coquet (died 1127), Danish hermit and Roman Catholic saint

== See also ==
- Coquette (disambiguation)
