= Beatific vision =

Christian theological term

In Christian theology, the beatific vision (Latin: visio beatifica) refers to the ultimate state of happiness that believers will experience when they see God face to face in heaven. It is the ultimate direct self-communication of God to the angel and person. A person or angel possessing the beatific vision reaches, as a member of the communion of saints, perfect salvation in its entirety, i.e., heaven. The notion of vision stresses the intellectual component of salvation, i.e., the immediate contemplation of God, though it encompasses the whole of the experience of joy, with happiness coming from seeing God finally face to face and not imperfectly through faith. (1 Cor 13:11–12).

It is related to the Catholic and Eastern Orthodox belief in theosis, the Wesleyan notion of Christian perfection, and is seen in most church denominations as the reward for Christians in the afterlife.

In Islamic theology, those who die as believers and enter Jannah will be given the vision of Allah.

== Etymology ==
"Beatific" is derived from the Latin past participle beatificum, made happy. "Vision" comes from the Latin noun visio, sight; so beatifica visio is 'a sight that makes one happy'.

== Judaism ==
According to Rashi, the face of God is twofold: God's care for Israel, and God's essence.

According to rabbinic literature, all the prophets of the Tanakh (Old Testament) saw God dimly, as if through nine glass windows - save for Moses, who saw God clearly, as if through one glass window ((Yeb. 49b; Lev. R. i. 14)).

== Christianity ==
=== New Testament ===
According to the New Testament, Jesus teaches in the Beatitudes that the pure of heart will see God (Matthew 5:8) and that children's angels see the face of God the Father (Matthew 18:10). The Apostles teach that "[f]or now we see in a mirror dimly, but then face to face" (1 Corinthians 13:12), that without holiness "no one will see the Lord" (Hebrews 12:14), and that God's people "will see his face" (Revelation 22:4).

=== History ===
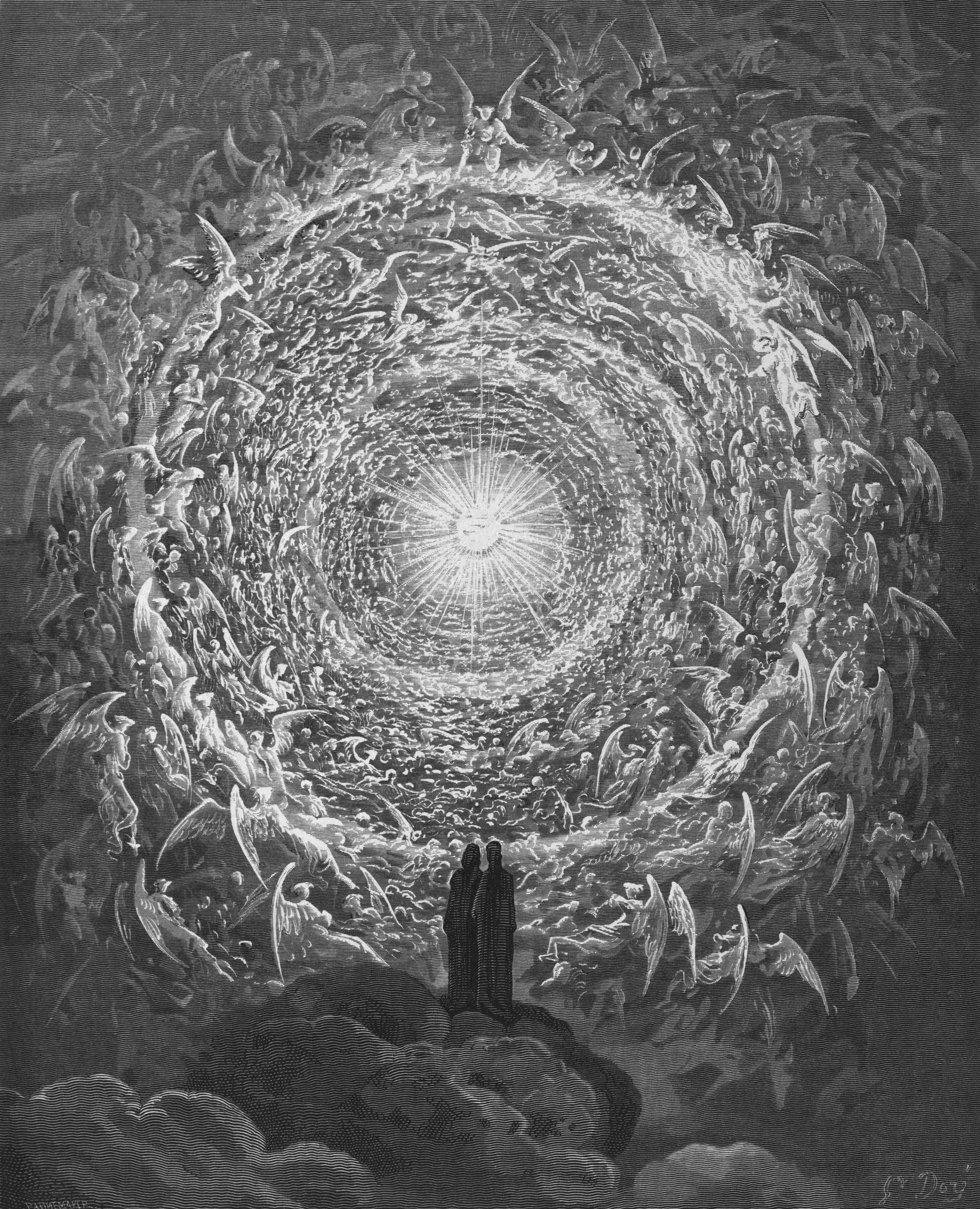
Gustave Dore's image of the beatific vision, from Dante Alighieri's Divine Comedy

In Christianity, the Bible states that God "dwells in unapproachable light, whom no one has even seen or can see" (1 Timothy 6:16), but when God reveals himself to us in heaven we will then see him face to face (1 Corinthians 13:12). This concept has been termed "the beatific vision of God" by theologians of the Catholic Church and later on by various Protestant denominations, including the Lutheran Church and the Methodist Church.

Cyprian wrote of the saved's seeing God in the Kingdom of Heaven.

How great will your glory and happiness be, to be allowed to see God, to be honored with sharing the joy of salvation and eternal light with Christ your Lord and God... to delight in the joy of immortality in the Kingdom of Heaven with the righteous and God's friends!

Edward A. Pace in the Catholic Encyclopedia (1907) defined the beatific vision:

The immediate knowledge of God which the angelic spirits and the souls of the just enjoy in Heaven. It is called "vision" to distinguish it from the mediate knowledge of God which the human mind may attain in the present life. And since in beholding God face to face the created intelligence finds perfect happiness, the vision is termed "beatific."

Methodist co-founder Charles Wesley, in his 1747 hymn "Maker, in Whom We Live", described union with God through the Holy Spirit as "beatific sight":

Spirit of Holiness, let all thy saints adore
Thy sacred energy, and bless thine heart-renewing power.
No angel tongues can tell thy love's ecstatic height,
the glorious joy unspeakable, the beatific sight.

=== In the Catholic Church ===
==== Official teaching ====
The Church believes in the beatific vision because Jesus experienced it from His conception to ascension, taught about it and promised it, and makes Catholics foretaste it by faith.

Pope Benedict XII taught ex cathedra in his papal encyclical Benedictus Deus that the beatific vision happens immediately after death:

[I]mmediately after death ... all the saints ... have been, are and will be with Christ in heaven, in the heavenly kingdom and paradise, joined to the company of the holy angels ... these souls have seen and see the divine essense with an intuitive vision and even face to face, without the mediation of any creature by way of object of vision; rather the divine essence immediately manifests itself to them, plainly, clearly and openly, and in this vision they enjoy the divine essence. Moreover, by this vision and enjoyment the souls ... are truly blessed and have eternal life and rest ... Such a vision and enjoyment of the divine essence do away with the acts of faith and hope in these souls, inasmuch as faith and hope are properly theological virtues. And after such intuitive and face-to-face vision and enjoyment has or will have begun for these souls, the same vision and enjoyment has continued and will continue without any interruption and without end until the last Judgment and from then on forever.

===== Roman Catechism =====
According to the Roman Catechism, the saints in heaven see God, whereby they share in God's nature, wherewith they are truly and always happy. The catechism elaborates that the saints' happiness includes not just joy, but also glory (knowledge of one another's dignity), honor (reverence for one another as adopted sons of God), and peace (fulfillment of all the heart's desires). Moreover, the catechism adds, the beatific vision will, on Judgment Day, make the saints' resurrected bodies impassible (free from inconvenience, suffering, and death), bright as the angels, agile (free from the limitations of space-time), and subtle (as subject to the soul as the soul is subject to God).

===== Catechism of the Catholic Church =====
According to the Catechism of the Catholic Church and the Compendium of the Catechism of the Catholic Church, the beatific vision is God opening himself in an inexhaustible way to the saints, so that they can see him face to face, and thereby share in his nature, and therefore enjoy eternal, definitive, supreme, perfect, and ever new happiness. The catechism teaches that this happiness includes not just communion and perfect life with the Trinity and the saints, but also the fulfillment of all the heart's desires – including, on Judgment Day, the body being glorified, even endowed with impassibility, brightness, agility, and subtlety – and continual cooperation with God's will – including praying for all other people, even proffering one's merits to God for others' sake. The catechism elaborates that the beatific vision is a grace and a privilege intended for everyone to attain, and that the beatific vision is attained immediately after death – or after purgatory – yet it is already foretasted in baptism and in the eucharist. The catechism also teaches that the beatific vision is expressed in different ways in the New Testament: the kingdom of God, the vision of God, eternal life, divine adoption, a share in the divine nature, the joy of the Lord, and rest in God.

===== Description of the vision of God =====
====== Doctrinal errors ======
The Church has condemned many doctrinal errors about the vision of God. As a result, it teaches that the beatific vision is not natural (like a feeling, thought, dream, idea, desire, or mental image), indirect (like an apparition, locution, voice of God, Tabor light, odor of sanctity, religious ecstasy, or some other private revelation), mediate (involving a mediator between God and oneself, like how people saw, heard, felt, and otherwise perceived Jesus' humanity during his lifetime, including after His resurrection), relative (God being seen not as he is but as he is reflected in creation and in the saints), dark (God being seen not as he is but as inaccessible light coming from God), earned (God being seen not as he is but according to one's merit), unsatisfactory (one not sharing in God's happiness, which includes – but is not limited to – all of one's wants and needs being fulfilled beyond superabundance), imperfect (one not sharing in God's perfection, whereby one's moral state is impeccable), or finite (one not sharing in God's life, which is limitless and eternal).

====== Nature of the vision of God ======
The beatific vision is when God, though transcendent, opens himself up to people and angels, giving them the capacity to contemplate God in all His heavenly glory. Contemplation is the prayer of silently focusing on God and heeding His word; in other words, contemplation is the prayer of uniting with God.

====== Sanctifying grace and the vision of God ======
The beatific vision is ultimate union with God. It comes from sharing in God's holy nature via sanctifying grace.

====== Effect of the vision of God ======
Because God is life (fullness, beatitude, and perfection) itself, the beatific vision entails fullness of life (perfect friendship with Jesus and his angels and saints, including a share in Jesus' and the angels' and saints' own glories and honors) and ultimate beatitude and perfection (supreme definitive happiness, including immortality, i.e., freedom from Satan, temptation, sin, error, inconvenience, suffering, death, and every other evil).

====== Judgment Day and the vision of God ======
On Judgment Day, the saints will experience the beatific vision with their bodies as well. Their bodies will be as deified as their souls. Deification entails:

- Impassibility (incorruptible / painless) – freedom from evil, i.e., temptation, sin, suffering, error, inconvenience, boredom, Satan, and death
- Agility – one's body will not act faster than one's mind or give in to emotion and impulse, for the body will be as obedient to the soul as the soul is to God
- Clarity – resplendent beauty and the five crowns

====== Recipients of the vision of God ======
The beatific vision is a grace and a privilege intended for every person and angel, since God created people and angels to enjoy the beatific vision. The beatific vision is the ultimate purpose of each person's and angel's life.

====== Jesus and the vision of God ======
Because Jesus is considered God and man, His human nature experienced the beatific vision from conception to His ascension into heaven. Despite this, Jesus suffered, was crucified, and died as a human being.

==== Unofficial teaching ====
===== Thomas Aquinas =====
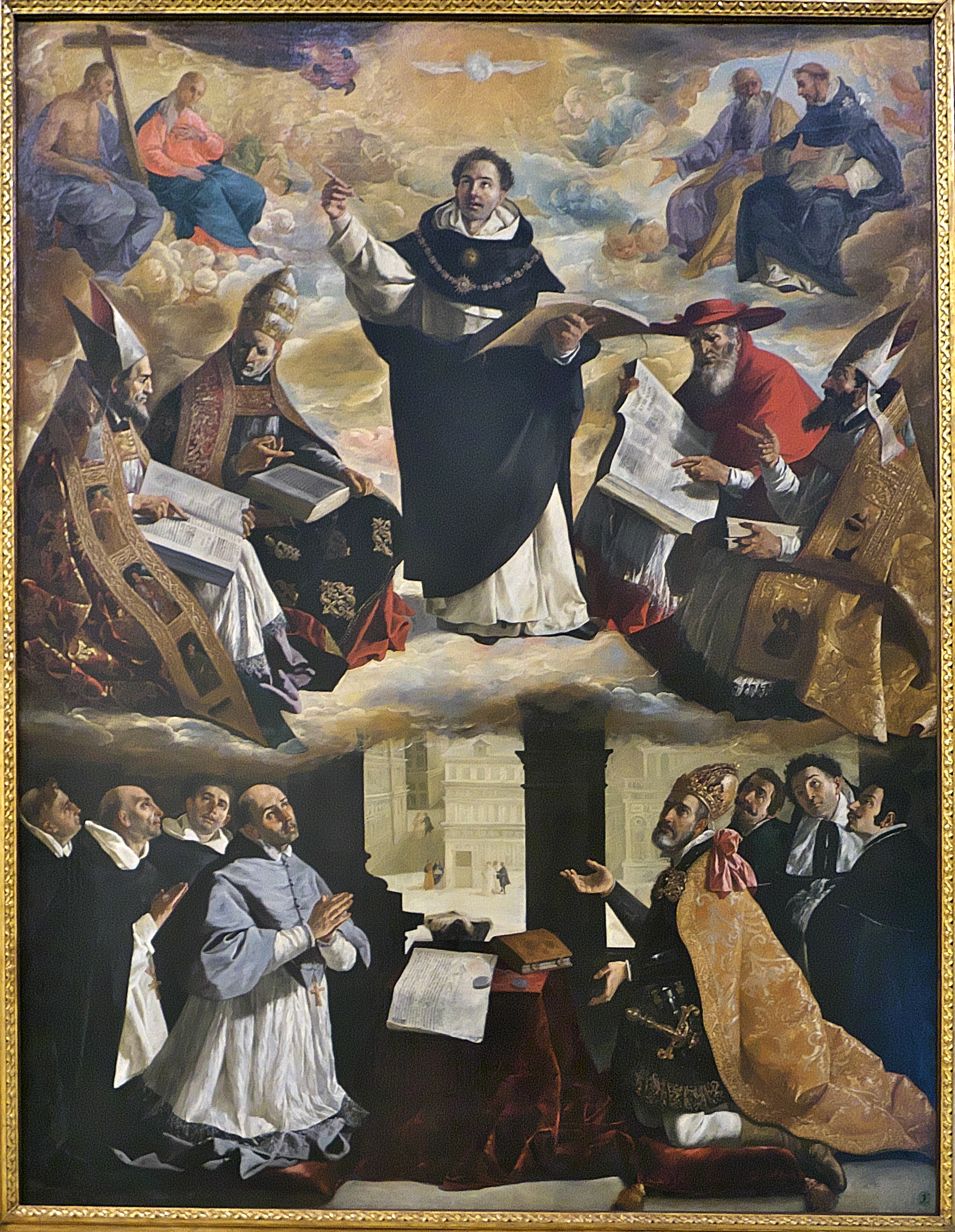
The Apotheosis of Saint Thomas Aquinas by Francisco de Zurbarán (1631)

Thomas Aquinas defined the beatific vision as the human being's "final end" in which one attains to a perfect happiness. Thomas reasons that one is perfectly happy only when all one's desires are perfectly satisfied, to the degree that happiness could not increase and could not be lost. "Man is not perfectly happy, so long as something remains for him to desire and seek." But this kind of perfect happiness cannot be found in any physical pleasure, any amount of worldly power, any degree of temporal fame or honor, or indeed in any finite reality. It can only be found in something that is infinite and perfect – and this is God. And since God is not a material thing but is pure spirit, we are united to God by knowing and loving Him. Consequently, the union with God is the most perfect human happiness and the ultimate goal of human life. But we cannot attain to this happiness by our own natural powers; it is a gift that must be given us by God, who strengthens us by the "light of glory" so that we can see Him as he is, without any intermediary (Thomas quotes Psalm 36:9 on this point: "In your light we shall see light.") Further, since every created image or likeness of God (including even the most perfect "ideas" or "images" of God we might generate in our minds) is necessarily finite, it would thus be infinitely less than God himself. The only perfect and infinite good, therefore, is God Himself, which is why Aquinas argues that our perfect happiness and final end can only be the direct union with God Himself and not with any created image of Him. This union comes about by a kind of "seeing" perfectly the divine essence itself, a gift given to our intellects when God joins them directly to Himself without any intermediary. And since in seeing this perfect vision of what (and who) God is, we grasp also His perfect goodness, this act of "seeing" is at the same time a perfect act of loving God as the highest and infinite goodness.

According to Aquinas, the beatific vision surpasses both faith and reason. Rational knowledge does not fully satisfy humankind's innate desire to know God, since reason is primarily concerned with sensible objects and thus can only infer its conclusions about God indirectly.

The theological virtue of faith, too, is incomplete, since Aquinas states that it always implies some imperfection in the understanding. The believer does not wish to remain merely on the level of faith but to grasp directly the object of faith, who is God himself.

Thus only the fullness of the beatific vision satisfies this fundamental desire of the human soul to know God. Quoting Paul, Aquinas notes "We see now in a glass darkly, but then face to face" (1 Cor. 13,12). Moreover, 2 Cor. 5,2 affirms that "if our earthly house, this tent, is destroyed, we have a building from God, a house not made with hands, eternal in the heavens." The beatific vision is the final reward for those saints elected by God to partake in and "enjoy the same happiness wherewith God is happy, seeing Him in the way which He sees Himself" in the next life.

===== Pope John XXII and the beatific vision controversy =====
Pope John XXII (1316–1334) caused a controversy involving the beatific vision, saying – not as Pope but as a private theologian – the saved do not attain the beatific vision until Judgment Day, a view more consistent with soul sleep. The general understanding at the time was that the saved attained Heaven after being purified and before Judgment Day. He never proclaimed his belief as doctrine but rather as an opinion (ex cathedra, as defined at the First Vatican Council in 1870).

The Sacred College of Cardinals held a consistory on the problem in January 1334, and Pope John backed away from his novel views to the more standard understanding.

His successor, Pope Benedict XII, in the bull Benedictus Deus, taught that the saved see Heaven (and thus, God) before Judgement Day.

===== Catholic Encyclopedia =====
The Catholic Encyclopedia defines the beatific vision as the immediate knowledge of God enjoyed by all the heavenly creatures. It explains that the vision of God is called "beatific" because by seeing God the mind finds perfect happiness, and called "vision" because the sight of God in heaven is not the same as mediate knowledge of God.

===== Private revelations =====
Catholic saints who are regarded as having seen or visited heaven have not mentioned the beatific vision. Instead, they have sometimes given materialistic descriptions of heaven (garden, mansion, city, etc.) and sometimes given spiritual descriptions of heaven (joy, peace, lack of time, etc.).

== Islam ==
According to the Quran, on Judgment Day "some faces will be bright, looking towards their Lord" (75:22-23). Ala-Maududi comments that some commentators have understood this to mean that people will see their Lord in a way that does not resemble seeing created entities, and that as for himself, he believes "in the Hereafter the dwellers of Paradise will not see Allah in the specific form in which man sees something in the world, but their nature of seeing will be different."
