= Coquette =

A coquette is a flirtatious woman. It may refer to:

- Coquette aesthetic, a 2020s fashion trend that which focuses on femininity with sweet elements
- The Coquette (film), a 1917 German silent comedy film
- Coquette (film), an Academy Award-winning 1929 film starring Mary Pickford
- Coqueta (1949 film), a Mexican musical film
- Coqueta (1983 film), a Mexican musical drama film
- Coquette (play), a 1927 Broadway play by George Abbot and Ann Preston Bridgers
- "Coquette" (song), 1928 song by Johnny Green, Carmen Lombardo, and Gus Kahn
- "Coquette", 1928 song by Irving Berlin
- Coquette Productions, the production company of Courteney Cox and David Arquette
- The Coquette, a 1797 epistolary novel by Hannah Webster Foster
- HMS Coquette, various ships of the British Royal Navy
- Coquettes, several species of hummingbird in the genus Lophornis, and the Racket-tailed coquette in the genus Discosura
- Cocotte (prostitute), courtesans in France during the Second French Empire

== See also ==
- Coquet (disambiguation)
