= Coquet Island =

Island in Northumberland, England

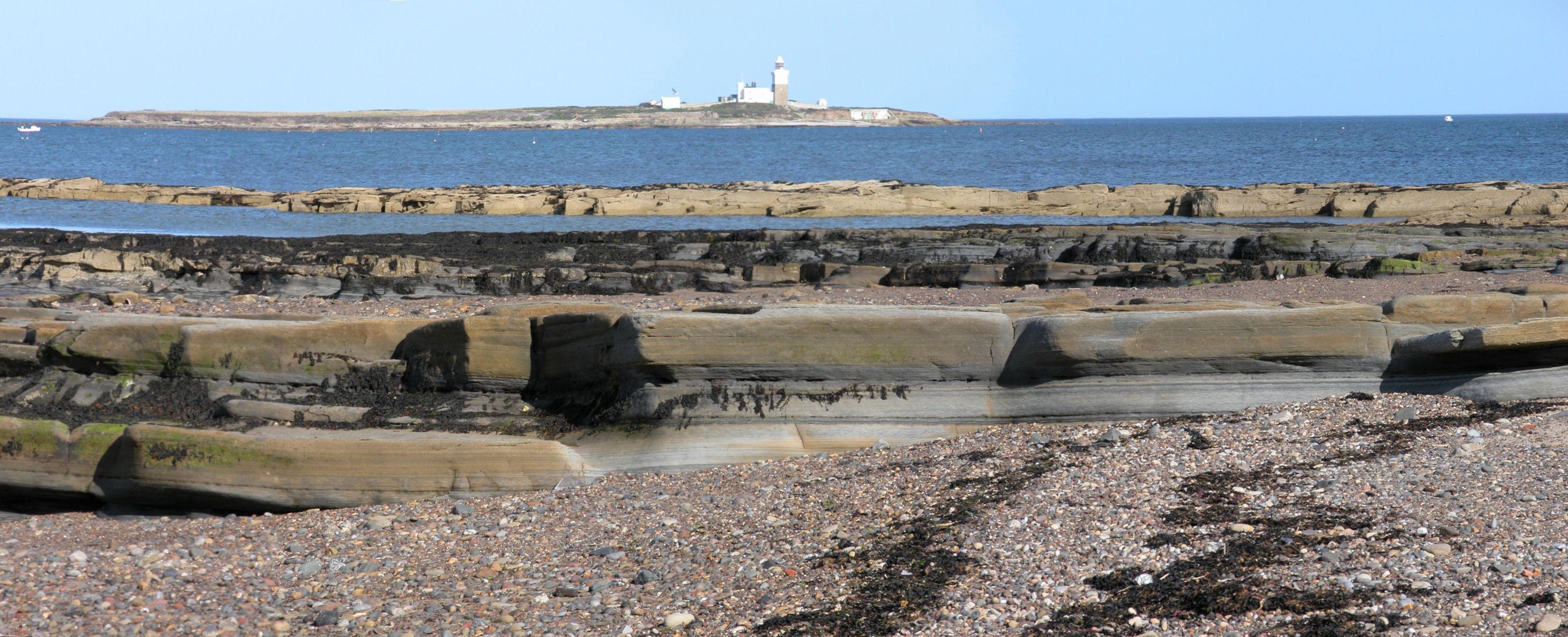

- Location within Northumberland

Geography
- Location: North Sea
- Coordinates: 55.335°N 1.539°W
- OS grid reference: NU293046
- Area: 6 ha (15 acres)

Administration
- United Kingdom

Coquet Island /ˈkoʊkət/ is a small island of about 6 hectares (15 acres), situated 1.2 kilometres (0.75 mi) off Amble on the Northumberland coast, northeast England. It is included in the civil parish of Hauxley.

== Bird reserve ==
The island is owned by the Duke of Northumberland. The Royal Society for the Protection of Birds manages the island as a bird reserve, for its important seabird colonies.

The most numerous species is the puffin, with over 18,000 pairs nesting in 2002, but the island is most important for the largest colony of the endangered roseate tern in Britain, which, thanks to conservation measures including the provision of nestboxes to protect the nests from gulls and bad weather, has risen to 118 pairs in 2018. Other nesting birds include sandwich tern, common tern, Arctic tern, black-legged kittiwake, fulmar, three other gull species, and eider duck.

The island is uninhabited in winter, but seasonal wardens are present throughout the summer to protect the nesting birds. Landing on Coquet Island for the general public is prohibited, but boats from local companies in Amble sail close up to the island in good weather throughout the summer, allowing visitors to get good views of the puffins and roseate terns.

== Coquet Lighthouse ==
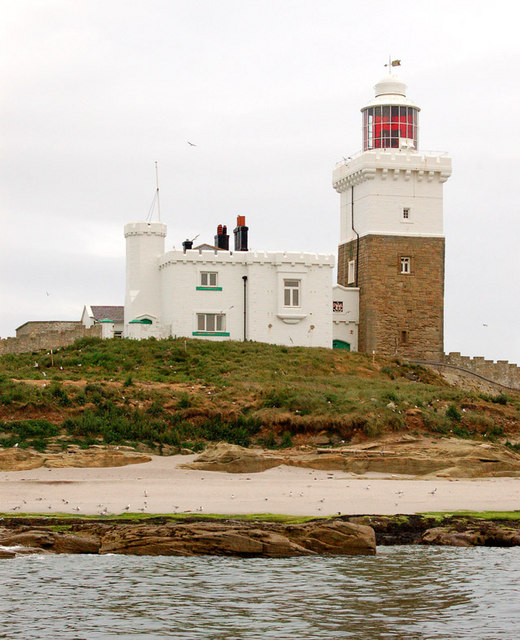
Coquet Island Lighthouse

Coquet Lighthouse
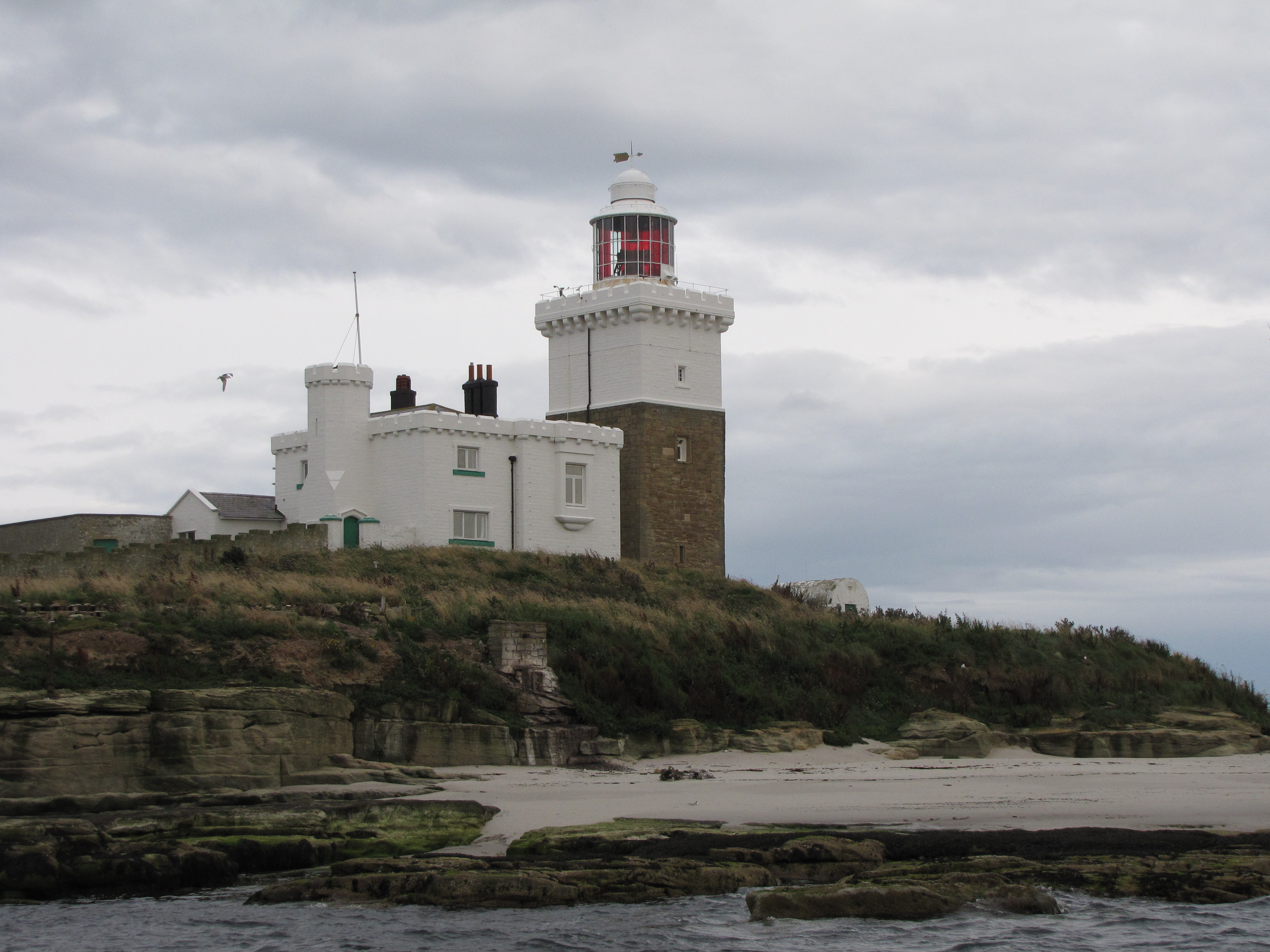
- The lighthouse
- Location: Coquet Island; Northumberland; England
- OS grid: NU2930504532
- Coordinates: 55°20′2″N 1°32′23.2″W

Tower
- Constructed: 1841
- Built by: James Walker
- Construction: sandstone tower
- Automated: 1990
- Height: 22 m (72 ft)
- Shape: square tower with balcony and lantern
- Markings: unpainted lower tower, white upper tower and lantern
- Power source: solar power
- Operator: Trinity House
- Heritage: Grade II* listed building
- Fog signal: one 2 second blast every 30s.

Light
- Focal height: 25 m (82 ft)
- Lens: 1st order catadioptric fixed lens
- Intensity: white: 155,000 candela red: 21,830 candela
- Range: white: 19 nmi (35 km) red: 15 nmi (28 km)
- Characteristic: Fl (3) WR 20s.

Coquet Island was the home at one time of Henry of Coquet (died 1127), a Dane who lived in a hermitage there. The island also holds the remaining structure of a medieval monastery on the southwestern shore, which was largely incorporated into the 19th-century lighthouse and lighthouse keepers' cottages.

Coquet Lighthouse was built by Trinity House in 1841 at a cost of £3,268. James Walker designed the lighthouse, which is a white square tower of sandstone, with walls more than one metre thick, surrounded by a turreted parapet. The first keeper at Coquet Lighthouse was William Darling, the elder brother of Grace Darling.

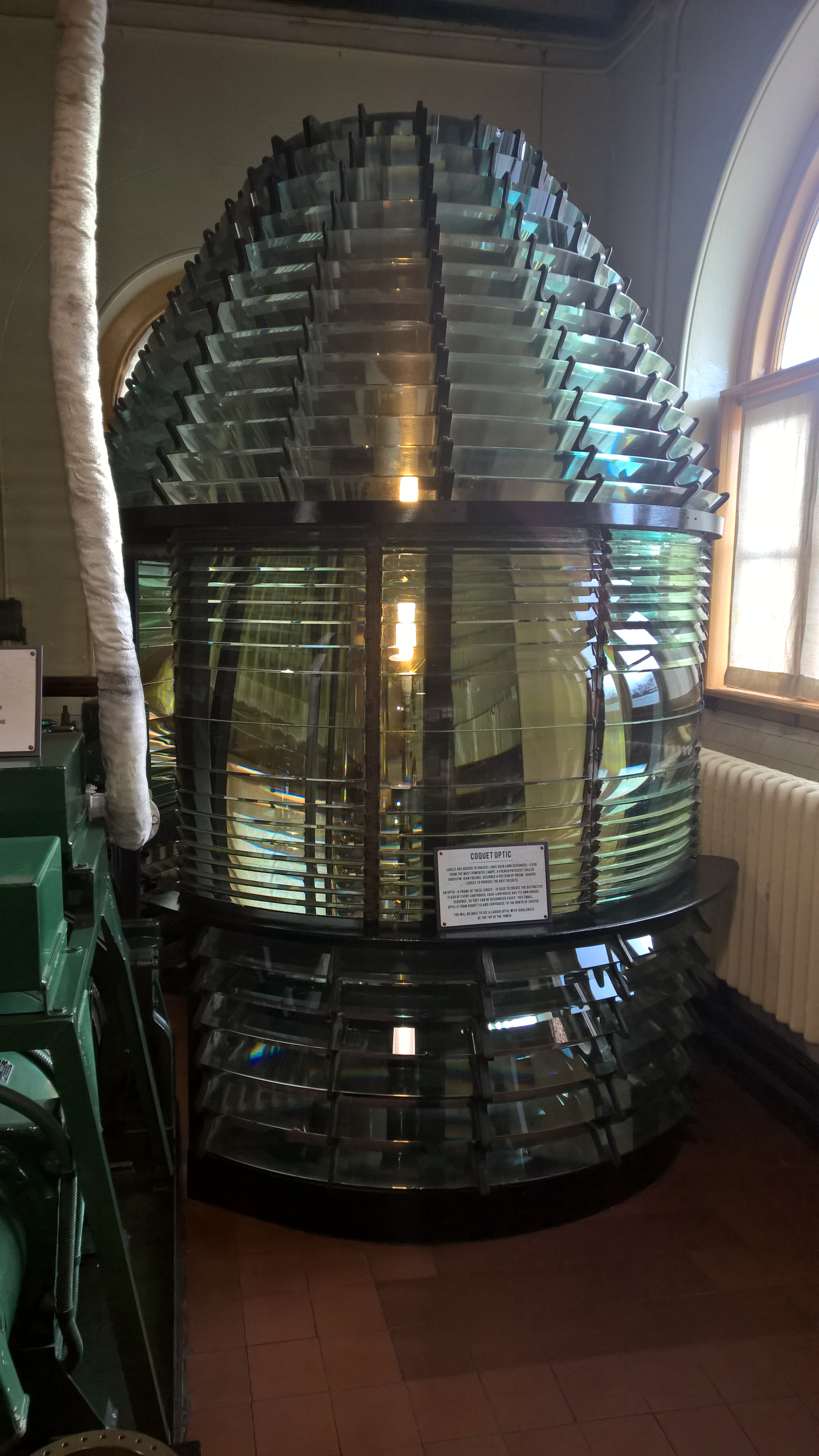
The former optic from Coquet Island Lighthouse.

The lighthouse was initially provided with a large (first-order) fixed dioptric along with a set of mirrors (which were replaced with refracting prisms ten years later); the lens was by Isaac Cookson & co. of Newcastle upon Tyne. The lamp was oil-fuelled.

In 1854 red sectors were added, to warn ships of Hauxley Point to the south and Boulmer Rocks to the north. Later, in 1870, a separate sector light was added, pointing south from a lower window in the tower. In 1891 both lights were made much more powerful; the main lamp was replaced with an eight-wick mineral-oil burner, and its character was changed to occulting (being eclipsed for 2.5 seconds every minute).

An explosive fog signal was established at the lighthouse in 1902, which sounded once every seven-and-a-half minutes; later sounding every three minutes, it was still in use in the 1970s. The light was electrified in 1976; up until this date a paraffin vapour burner provided the main light, and an old-style Argand lamp provided the sector light.

In 1990 the lighthouse was automated, at which point a revolving array of quartz halogen sealed beam lamps were installed in place of the old optic, with columns of lamps grouped in threes on a rotating pedestal, so as to display three flashes every 30 seconds. Subsequently, these were replaced by a small revolving optic, mounted on an AGA PRB gearless drive. Coquet's light has been solar powered since 2008.

After its removal from the tower, the original 1841–1851 optic was exhibited (along with the old occulting apparatus) at the Trinity House National Lighthouse Museum in Penzance. After the museum closed they were loaned to Souter Lighthouse where they were displayed for a number of years.

In 2025 Trinity House announced their intention to return the original optic to Coquet, where it will fulfil its original purpose in conjunction with a modern LED lamp.

== See also ==
- List of lighthouses in England
- The Farne Islands; another important bird reserve about 30 km to the north
- Henry of Coquet (12th century) – Danish hermit and miracleworking saint who lived on this island
