= Úrsula Micaela Morata =

Ursula Micaela Morata
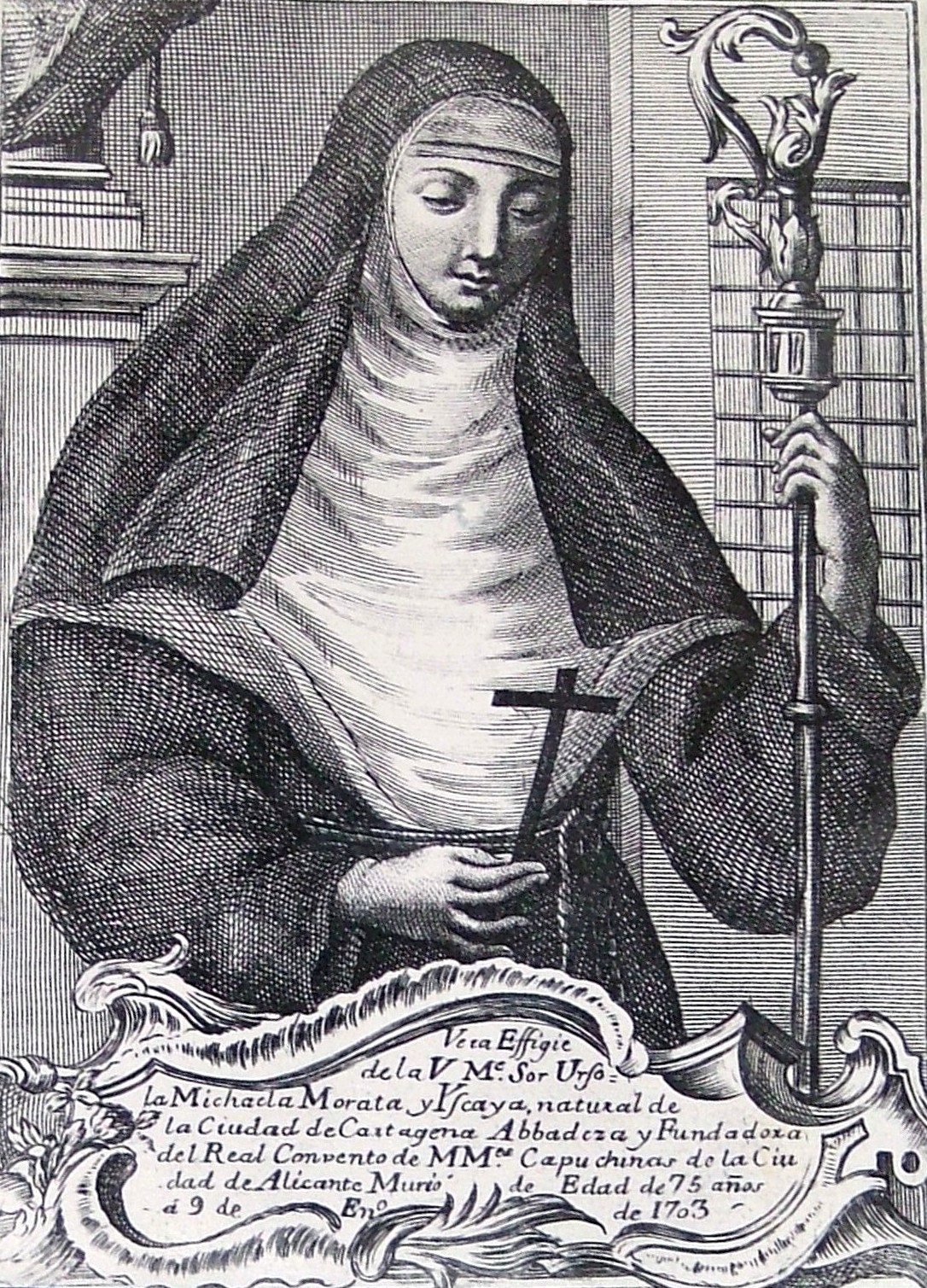
- Sister Ursula Micaela Morata

Venerable
- Born: 21 October 1628; Cartagena, Spain
- Died: 9 January 1703; Alicante, Spain
- Venerated in: Roman Catholic Church
- Feast: –

Ursula Micaela Morata (Cartagena, Spain, 21 October 1628 – Alicante, Spain, 9 January 1703) was a nun, mystic, and founder of the convent of the Capuchin Poor Clares in Alicante, Spain.

== Childhood ==
Born into a well-to-do family, Morata was the youngest of thirteen brothers and sisters. Her father, Marco Aurelio Morata e Iscaya, was an Italian knight from Savoy. Her mother, Juana Garibaldo, from Madrid, was also of Italian ancestry. They died within three days of each other in 1632, when Morata was three years old. She was left in the care of her elder sister, Sebastiana. When she was four years old, she had her first mystical experience during an attack of smallpox that brought her to the brink of death. In her own words,

I was seized by a paroxysm in which I remained unconscious for more or less twenty-four hours. What joy my soul experienced during that time is impossible to describe. I found myself in an immense clarity and divine light that, while it offered no object or image to my sight, my faculties and senses so enjoyed that I thought I was already rapt up in glory. (Autobiografía, Chapter I)

Thus began her spiritual apprenticeship, in which she acquired the dominant ideas of the time as regards prayer, fasting and mortification, receiving through these practices other mystical experiences.

Thanks to her sister, she learned to read and to write, an uncommon practice at the time, especially for women.

== Early years as a nun ==
At the end of 15, it was proposed that she marry a man from Cartagena; she decided against this and joined the convent in Murcia. In 1647, she took her religious vows in the convent of the Capuchin Poor Clares of Murcia, adopting the name Micaela.

When plague ravaged Murcia in 1648, Sister Ursula Micaela nursed the sick. In 1651 and 1653 the river Segura overflowed, forcing the community of nuns to abandon their convent and take refuge on Monte de los Ermitas. During this period, Sister Ursula Micaela experienced the dark night of the soul, a stage of spiritual crisis described by many mystics. In 1652, she was ordered by her confessor to write her autobiography.

== Spiritual progress ==
In 1653, at the end of her dark night of the soul, she experienced transverberation of the heart in a manner similar to Saint Teresa of Ávila:

I was shown in spirit an angel with a fiery dart, which he thrust into my heart. The pain and fire that I felt was so great that it seemed to penetrate my bones and I fell to the ground in a faint. But the angel prevented me from being hurt. I spent an hour in joy and suffering I cannot express, except to say that I was burned in flames of divine love. (Autobiografía, Chapter VI)

Sister Ursula Micaela had various supernatural experiences also found in other mystics: visions, locutions, miracles, extrasensory perception, etc. She was especially noted for bilocation, which even took her to other nations, and prophecy, which made her an oracle to whom people turned for advice. This included Charles II of Spain.

In 1661, she was elected counselor and secretary of her religious community.

== Convent in Alicante ==
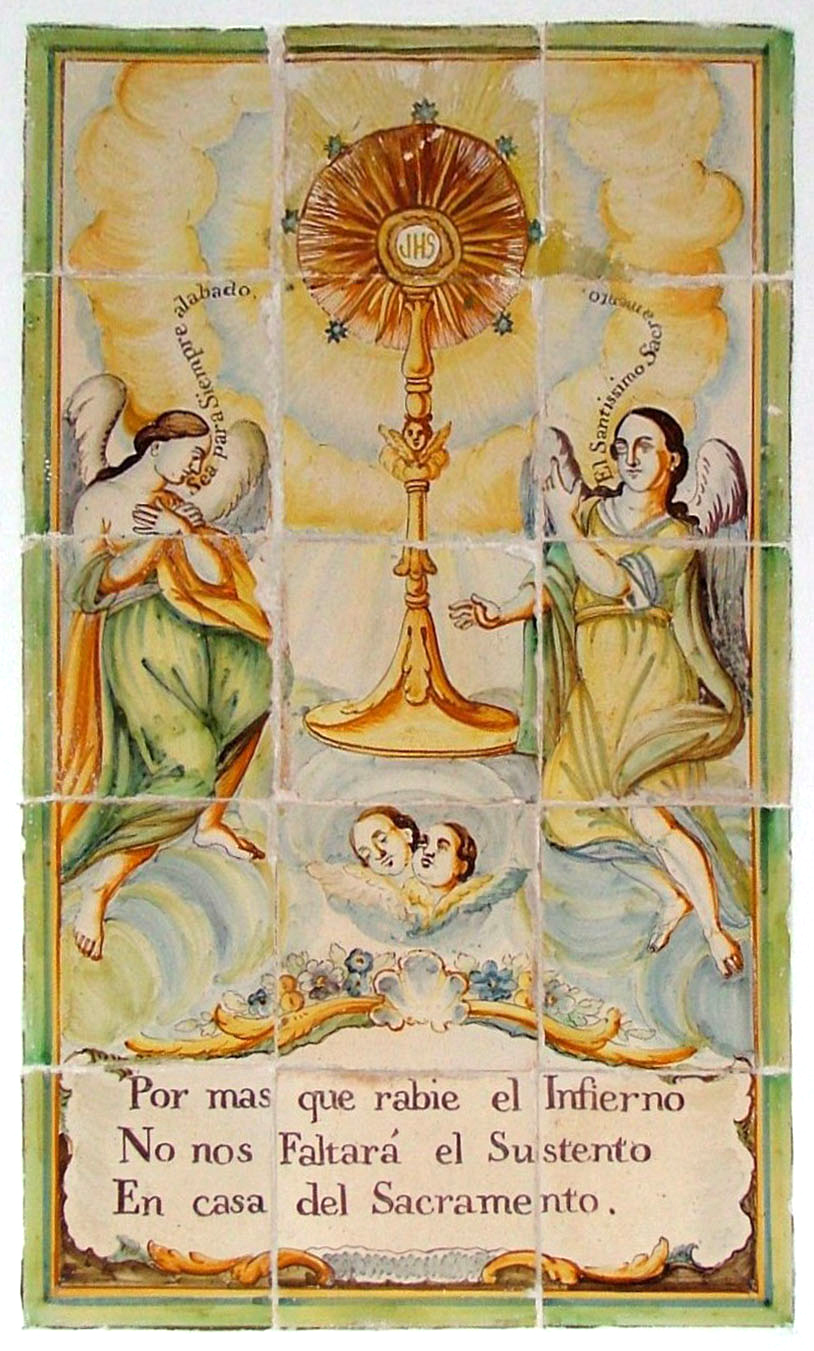
Azulejo of the foundation

In 1669, the first steps were taken to establish a convent of the Capuchin Poor Clares in the city of Alicante. The difficulties were many, and the foundation did not take place until 1672. The first residence was provisional, in a house not really appropriate for communitarian life. For that reason, work began on the construction of a convent and church, financed by donations from the people of Alicante and John of Austria the Younger, and under the protection of Charles II. The work was not completed until 1682. The convent received the title of Triumphs of the Blessed Sacrament, a name inspired by one of Sister Ursula's visions.

Sister Ursula Micaela held the office of vicaress (vicaria or deputy abbess) of the convent. In February 1699 she was elected abbess, an office she held until her death. These later experiences are not recorded in her Autobiography, since she left off writing it in 1684.

== Writings ==
- Autobiography (21 notebooks)
- Molina (Papeles Sueltos) (24 letters)
- Favours

== Death and cause for beatification ==
After two years of painful illness, she died on 9 January 1703, at the age of 75. The fame of her sanctity and the social prestige she had acquired resulted in her body lying in state in the church for six days. The body remained incorrupt, warm and supple, for which reason it was not interred.. In 1742, Juan Elías Gómez de Terán, Bishop of Orihuela, finding it still intact, ordered that it be placed in a coffer without being buried. Thus the body has been conserved until the present time, still remaining incorrupt and supple.

Sister Ursula Micaela's reputation for sanctity led José de la Torre y Orumbella, Bishop of Orihuela-Alicante, to initiate an examination of her life and virtues in 1703 with a view to beatification. As a result of fires in the archives during the War of the Spanish Succession and the Spanish Civil War, the resulting documents were lost. A diocesan inquiry for her beatification was opened by Rafael Palmero Ramos, Bishop of Orihuela-Alicante, on 11 October 2006 and concluded on 11 June 2009.

== Bibliography ==
- Memorias de una monja del Siglo XVII: autobiografía de la Madre Úrsula Micaela Morata, edited by Vicente Benjamin Piquer Garcés. Alicante: Hermanas Clarisas Capuchinas, 1999.
