= Locution (paranormal) =

Locution (from Latin locutio, -onis, a "speaking" < loqui "speak") is a paranormal phenomenon or supernatural revelation where a religious figure, statue or icon speaks, usually to a saint. Phenomena of locutions are described in the lives of Christian saints such as Saint Mary of Egypt (5th century), who heard the locution from the Icon of Virgin Mary at the Holy Sepulchre or in case of the Saint Henry of Coquet Island (d. 1127) who experienced the locution from the figure of Christ crucified.

== Locutions in Christianity ==
The Oxford Dictionary of Saints (1978) reports the locution phenomenon in the life of St. Henry of Coquet (p. 189), a Dane by birth, who was a hermit on an island off the British coast by Tynemouth:

"After some years, a party of Danes tried to persuade him to return to his own country, where there was no lack of sites suitable for hermits. But after a night in prayer and experience of a locution from the figure of Christ crucified, he decided to stay on. As his holiness became known, visitors became numerous, attracted by his special gifts of prophecy, telekinesis and reading the secrets of hearts".

Similarly, a comparable instance of locution is recounted in the life of Saint Mary of Egypt (p. 271, same edition):

"Once at Jerusalem, she was held back from entering the church with the other pilgrims by an invisible and irresistible force. Lifting her eyes to an icon of the Blessed Virgin, she was told to go over the Jordan where she would find rest".

== See also ==
- Interior locution
