= Gabriel Gerberon =

Gabriel Gerberon (August 12, 1628 in St. Calais, Sarthe, France – March 29, 1711 at the abbey of St. Denis) was a Jansenist monk.

== Biography ==
At the age of twenty he took the vows of the Benedictine order at the abbey of Sainte Melaine, Rennes, and afterwards taught rhetoric and philosophy in several monasteries. His open advocacy of Jansenist opinions, however, caused his superiors to relegate him to the most obscure houses of the order, and finally to keep him under surveillance at the abbey of Saint-Germain-des-Prés at Paris.

Here he wrote a defence of the doctrine of the Real Presence against the Calvinists in the form of an apology for Rupert, abbot of Deutz (Apologia pro Ruperto abbate Tuitensi, Paris, 1669). In 1676 he published at Brussels, under the name of Sieur Flore de Ste Foi his Miroir de la piété chrétienne, an enlarged edition of which appeared at Liège in the following year. This was condemned by certain archbishops and theologians as the repetition of the five condemned propositions of Jansen, and Gerberon defended it, under the name of Abbé Valentin in Le Miroir sans tache (Paris, 1680). He had by this time aroused against him the full fury of the Jesuits, and at their instigation a royal provost was sent to Corbie to arrest him. He had, however, just time to escape, and fled to the Low Countries, where he lived in various towns.

Gerberon was invited by the Jansenist clergy to Holland, where he wrote another controversial work against the Protestants: Défense de l'Église Romaine contre la calomnie des Protestants (Cologne, 1688–1691). This produced unpleasantness with the Reformed clergy, and feeling himself no longer safe he returned to Brussels. In 1700 he published his history of Jansenism (Histoire générale du Jansénisme), by which he is best remembered.

He adhered firmly to the Augustinian doctrine of Predestination, and on 30 May 1703 he was arrested at Brussels at the instance of the archbishop of Mechelen, and ordered to subscribe the condemnation of the five sentences of Jansen. On his refusal, he was handed over to his superiors and imprisoned in the citadel of Amiens and afterwards at Vincennes. Every sort of pressure was brought to bear upon him to make his submission, and at last, broken in health and spirit, he consented to sign a formula which the Cardinal de Noailles claimed as a recantation. Upon this he was released in 1710. The first use he made of his freedom was to write a work (which, however, his friends prudently prevented him from publishing), Le vain triomphe du cardinal de Noailles, containing a virtual withdrawal of the compulsory recantation.

== Works ==
Gerberon was one of the most prolific writers of the Maurist Congregation. René-Prosper Tassin ascribes one hundred and eleven works to him, many of which, however, are spurious. Of the sixty-one works ascribed to him by Karl von Lama, the following are the most important:

- Apologia pro Ruperto Abbate Tuitiensi (Paris, 1669), in which he proves against Salmasius and other Protestants that Abbot Rupert of Deutz held the Catholic doctrine of the Real Presence
- Histoire générale du Jansénisme (Amsterdam, 1700), 3 vols.
- Acta Marii Mercatoris (Brussels, 1673)
- Histoire de la robe sans couture de N. S. Jésus-Christ, qui est révérée dans l'église des Bénédictins d'Argenteuil (Paris, 1676)

His chief Jansenistic work is Le Miroir de la Piété chrétienne (Brussels, 1676). He also edited the works of St. Anselm: S. Anselmi opera omnia, necnon Eadmeri monachi Cantuar. Historia Novorum et alia opuscula (Paris, 1675).
