= HMS Coquette =

Six ships of the Royal Navy have borne the name HMS Coquette. A seventh was ordered but never completed:

- HMS Coquette (1783) was a 28-gun sixth rate captured from the French in 1783 and in service in 1785.
- HMS Coquette (1807) was a 20-gun sixth rate launched in 1807 and sold in 1817. She became a whaler and was lost in 1835.
- HMS Coquette was to have been an 18-gun corvette. She was ordered in 1835 and cancelled in 1851.
- HMS Coquette (1855) was a wooden Vigilant-class screw gunvessel launched in 1855 and broken up in 1868.
- HMS Coquette (1871) was an Ariel-class composite screw gunboat launched in 1871 and sold in 1889.
- HMS Coquette (1897) was a D-class destroyer launched in 1897 and sunk by a mine from a German submarine in 1916 (22 casualties).
- HMS Coquette (J305) was an Algerine-class minesweeper launched in 1943 and scrapped in 1958.
