= Fort Nativity (Fuerte de Nacimiento) =

Fuerte de Nacimiento
- Nacimiento, Bío Bío Chile
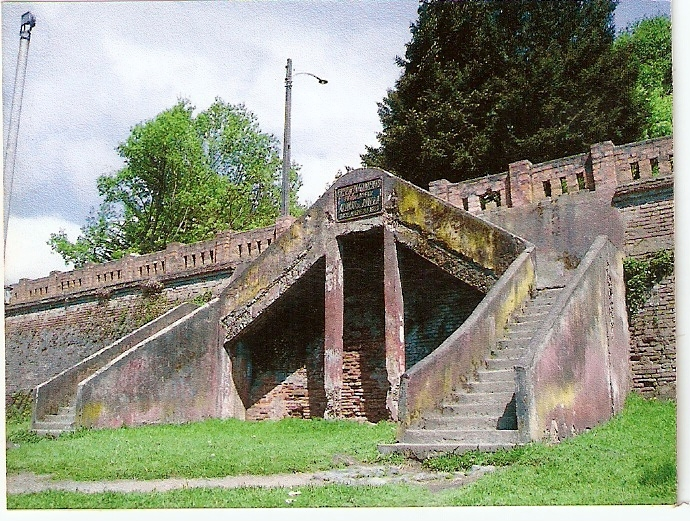
- Fuerte de Nacimiento, viewed from the north-east

Site information
- Type: Fortress
- Condition: partially restored

Location
- Coordinates: 37°30′S 72°40′W

Site history
- Built: 1603; 1752 (present version)

Fort Nativity (Spanish: El Fuerte de Nacimiento) is a fort founded by Governor Alonso de Ribera on 24 December 1603 at Nacimiento, Chile, roughly 550 km (350 miles) south of Santiago in what is now the central part of Chile. It was constructed on the western side of the Vergara River directly to the south of the Vergara's confluence with the Bío Bío, at what was then the country's southern frontier with the Araucano territories. Most of the fort's present structure dates from the middle of the eighteenth century.

It has been a designated national monument since 1954 and is currently undergoing significant restoration following earthquake damage in 2010.

== Name ==
The fort was originally named “Fuerte del Nacimiento de Nuestro Señor” ("Fort of the Nativity of our Lord"), which was appropriate, given its foundation on a Christmas Eve. Over the years the shorter name "Fuerte de Nacimiento" ("Fort of Nativity") has become more popular, however.

== History ==
Following the Disaster of Curalaba the King of Spain found himself obliged to appoint a replacement governor of Chile, and in 1599 he chose the distinguished soldier Alonso de Ribera de Pareja for the post. De Ribera left Seville in April 1600, arriving some three months later. A priority for the new governor was to secure the southern frontier of what remained of the colony. Nacimiento was one of several frontier forts now constructed in the frontier region. The location was the site of a former Mapuche stronghold. It enjoyed superb views in all directions which would make the fort difficult to attack by surprise.

The seventeenth century saw further conflict involving the Mapuche people to the south. The Mapuche Toqui (leader) led an attack on the fort on 3 February 1628, against which the Spanish captain, Pedro Junco, held out with a force of just 40 men until reinforcements arrived on the morning of 6 February. When the attackers finally retreated they took with then muskets and two canon. After this the frequency and intensity of attacks intensified. In 1655 the defenders had to flee. They headed for San Rosendo but were killed by the Mapuche. The fort was rebuilt in 1662, the work being completed in 1665, but attacks continued and the site was later abandoned and the colonists transferred their settlement and the fortifications to the north bank of the Bío Bío River. It was only in 1752 that the fort was returned to its former (and present) site.

== Today ==
The Fuerte de Nacimiento is an important tourist attraction, surrounded by the settlement of some 30,000 people that has grown up around it, focused on the timber and wood pulp industries. A major restoration was undertaken in 2008, although there was some controversy over the extent to which this involved replacing original features, and plans to open up recreational and park space within the fortress walls were never implemented.

The fort suffered serious earthquake damage on 27 February 2010, following which further restoration is in hand. The structure is increasingly being used for cultural and artistic events, with the hope that this may help to integrate it once more into the daily lives of the townsfolk.
