= Trinity House National Lighthouse Museum =

Museum in Cornwall, England

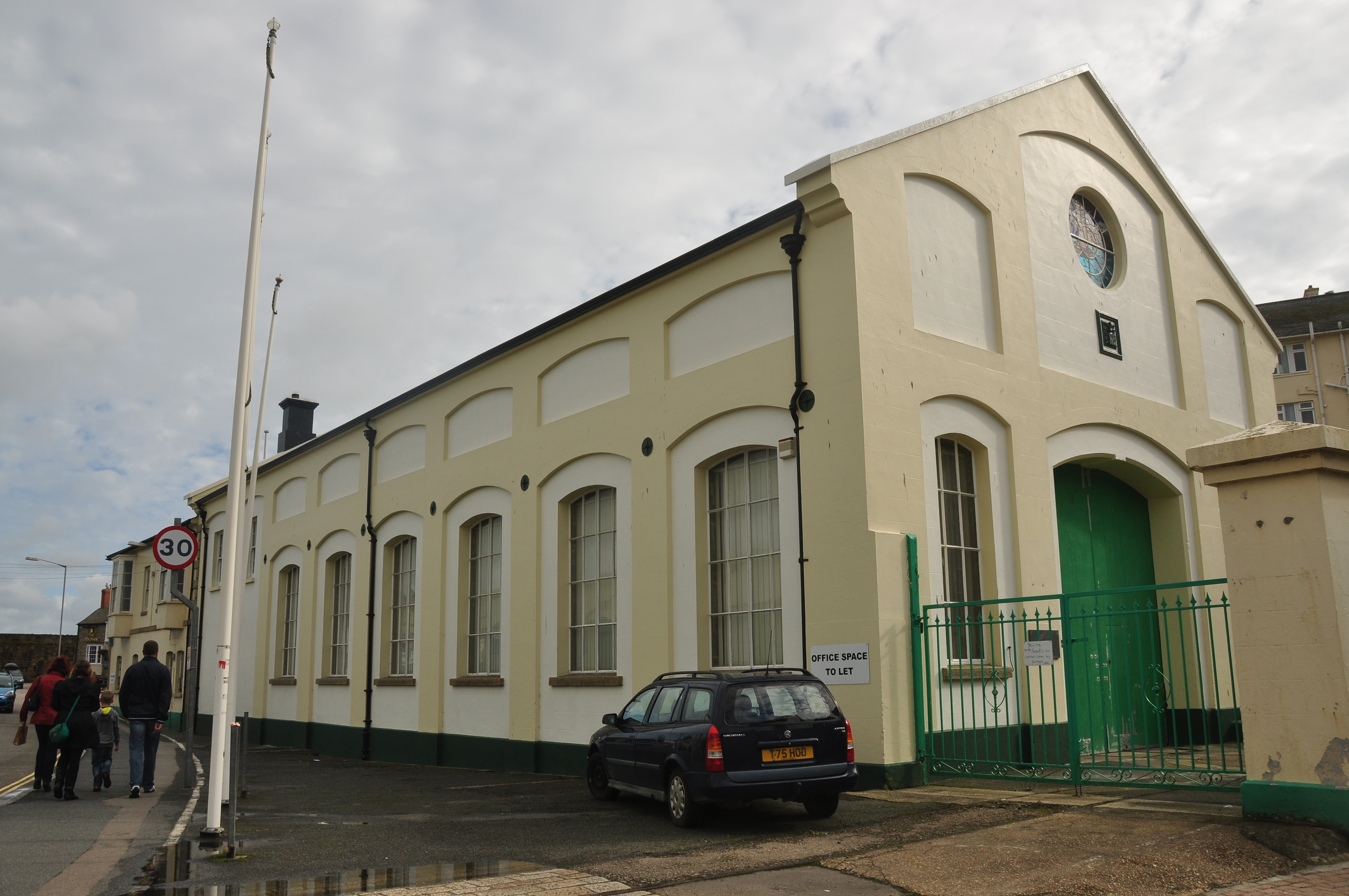
- Former museum building in 2012

- Location within Cornwall
- 50.11651°N 5.53159°W
- Location: Penzance, Cornwall, England

Listed Building – Grade II
- Official name: National Lighthouse Centre
- Designated: 6 March 2003
- Reference no.: 1350316

Trinity House National Lighthouse Centre was a museum in Penzance, Cornwall, UK which housed the national collection of Trinity House. It included significant amounts of lighthouse memorabilia which visitors could interact with, as well as a recreation of a light house keeper's bedroom. In February 2005 Trinity House announced the museum's closure and relocation of the collection to Plymouth. Trinity House confirmed that they would not be relocating the collection in 2009, and were in negotiations with National Maritime Museum Cornwall in Falmouth where some of the material was subsequently put on display.

== History ==
The National Lighthouse Centre was a museum opened by Trinity House, an organisation with a history of building and maintaining lighthouses, in 1989. The museum building was converted from the Trinity House buoy store, part of the Penzance Depot, where buoys were stored and repaired. It featured an interactive experience of lighthouse keepers, as well has housing Trinity House's collection of lighthouse equipment. It also featured a recreation of a lighthouse keeper's bed room where visitors were able to touch the exhibits, a collection of optics, lighthouse keepers' uniforms and documentation The museum also traced the history of Trinity House, and featured a selection of buoys from the buoy store.

Between 1989 and the museum's closure in February 2005, the museum hosted approximately 10,000 visitors each year. Despite a campaign to keep it open, in 2005, Trinity House closed the site as they were contemplating opening a replacement museum at a busier site in Plymouth. Trinity House confirmed that they would not be moving the museum to Plymouth in 2009, and that the memorabilia would no longer be visible to the public, though they would possibly display some at the National Maritime Museum Cornwall in Falmouth.
