= The Apotheosis of Saint Thomas Aquinas =

1631 painting by Francisco de Zurbarán

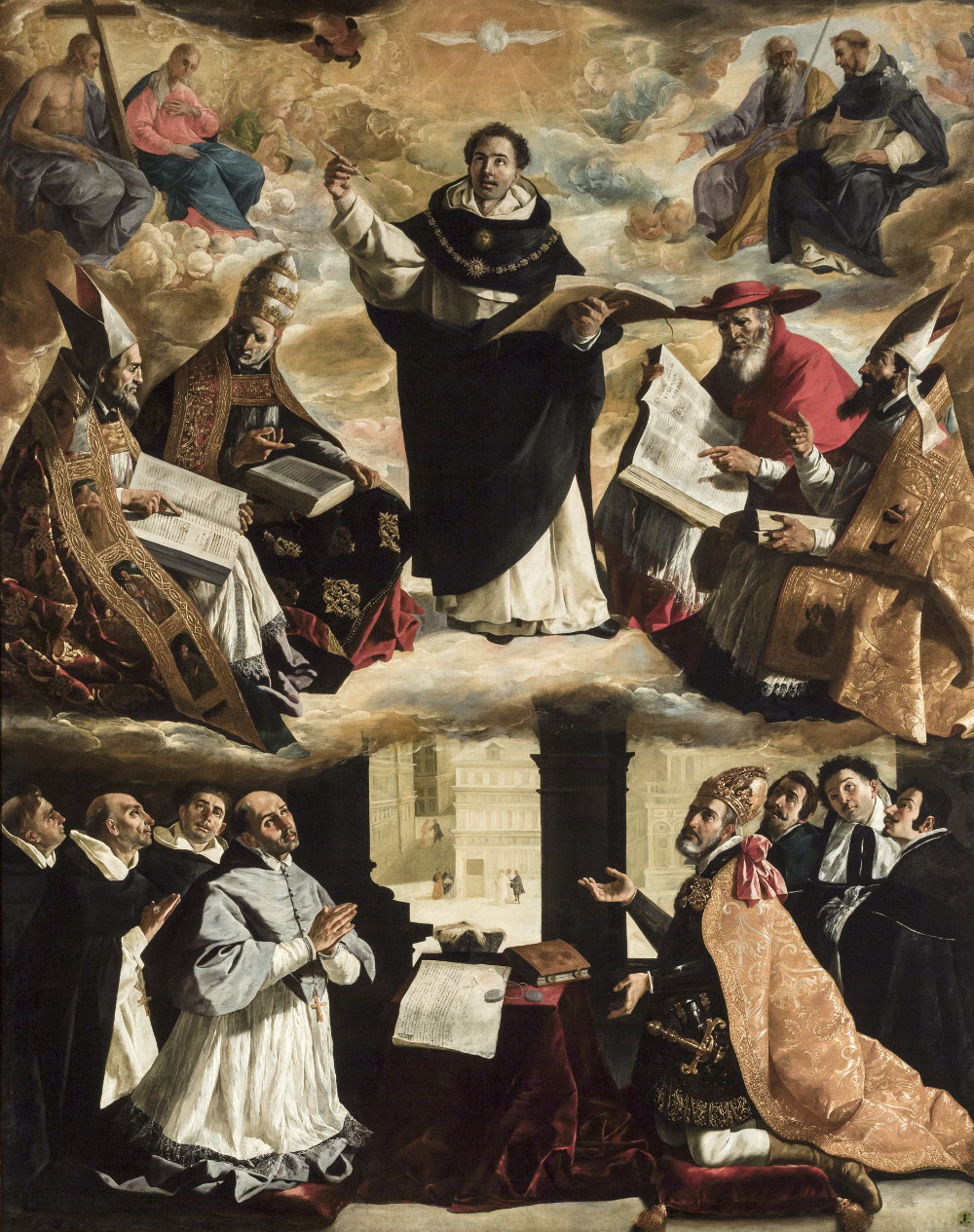
The Apotheosis of Saint Thomas Aquinas (1631) by Francisco de Zurbarán

The Apotheosis of Saint Thomas Aquinas is a 1631 altarpiece painting by Francisco de Zurbarán, originally painted for the Dominican College of Seville, but now in the Museum of Fine Arts of Seville. It is Zurbarán's largest composition.

It shows Saint Thomas Aquinas ascending to Heaven, where Christ, the Virgin Mary, the Apostle Paul, and Saint Dominic are enthroned, as the Holy Spirit descends upon him in the form of a dove; and surrounded by four other Doctors of the Church: Pope St. Gregory the Great, Saint Ambrose, Saint Jerome, and Saint Augustine of Hippo.

In the lower register of the picture, on the left a group of clergymen are kneeling, at the forefront of which is Diego Deza, founder of the college, with three Dominicans, Alonso de Ortiz, Pedro de Ballesteros and Diego Pinel; on the right, the Emperor Charles V and a group of unidentified figures in mozzettas; in the center on a table lies a parchment, on which several signatures can be seen, including that of Zurbarán himself.
