= Jan Baptist Martin Wans =

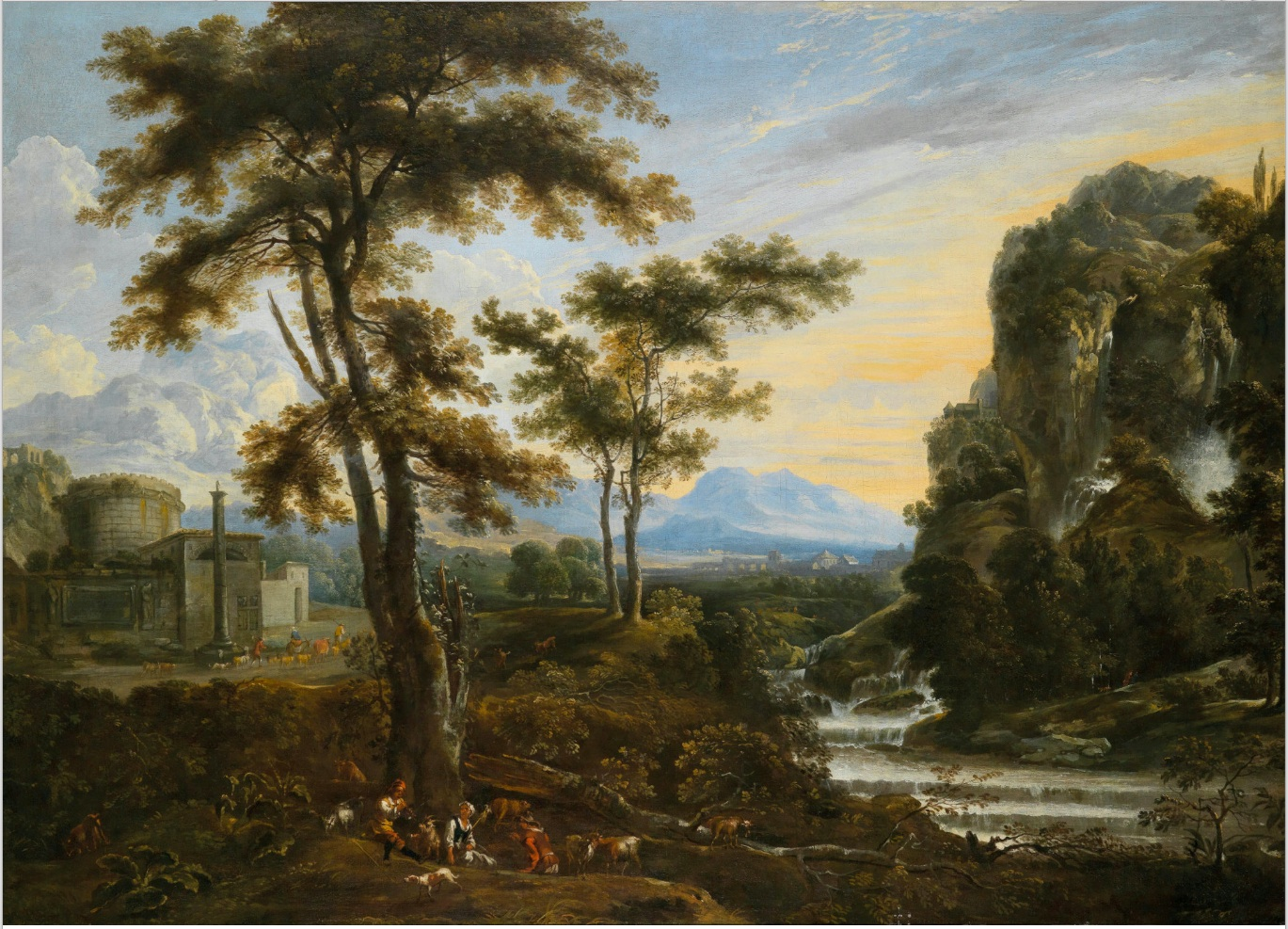
An Imaginary Landscape near Rome

Jan Baptist Martin Wans or Jan Baptist Wans (10 December 1628 – between 1684 and 1687) was a Flemish Baroque painter known for his landscapes and religious scenes.

== Life ==
Wans was born in Antwerp where he started his artist training in the studio of Frans van Oosten in 1641. He was registered with the Guild of Saint Luke in Antwerp as a pupil under the name 'Jan Baptist Wané'. In 1657 he became master of the Guild of Saint Luke in Antwerp. There has been some question as to whether it was another person with the same name who became master in 1657 because the time lapsed between the start of his apprenticeship and the year he became a master seems rather long. He married Cornelia van der Stael in 1659 and the couple had two sons.

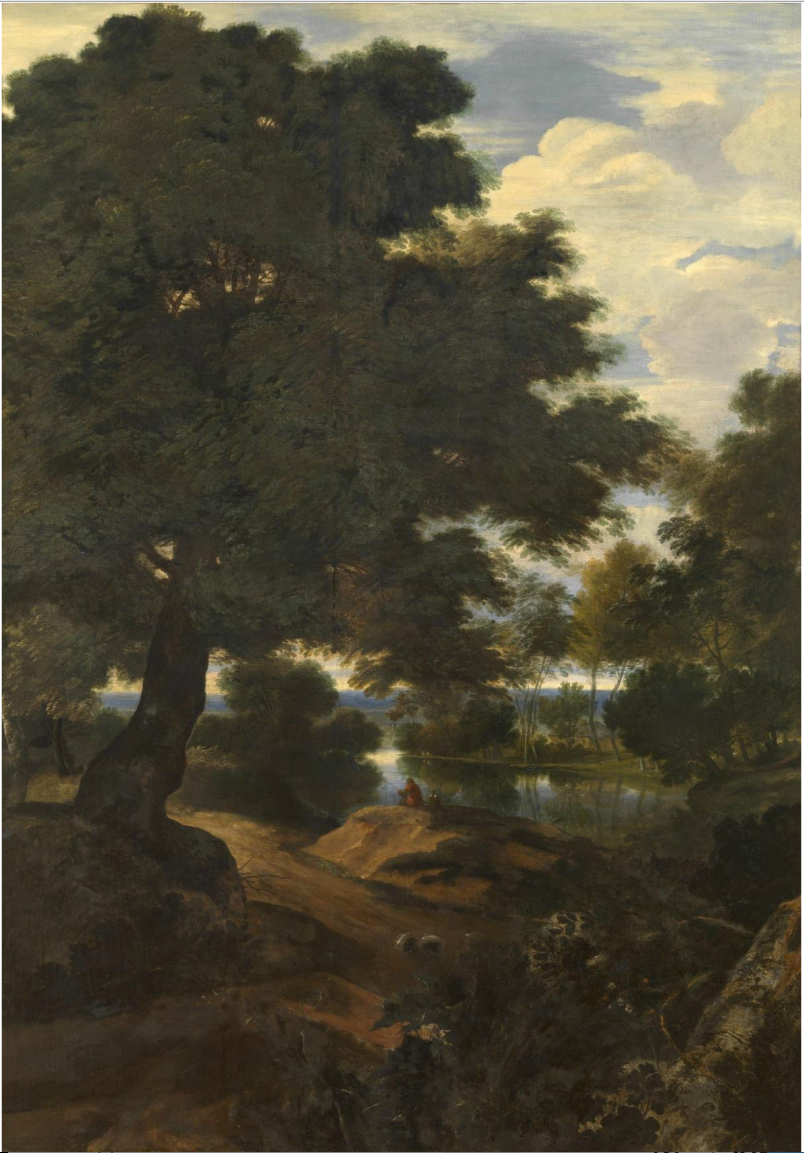
Landscape

He left Antwerp in 1661 and stayed abroad a few years but it is not clear where. Upon his return he became a captain of the civic guards by 1672, which earned him the nickname 'the Captain'. His wife died in 1684.

Wans died some time between February 1684 and June 1687. A ground for believing that he may have lived past 1684 is evidence of a legal dispute in 1685 involving a painter called Jan Baptist Wans over his refusal to hand over a painting that he had promised to give in return for services rendered by a doctor.

== Work ==
Only a few paintings of Jan Baptist Martin Wans are known to exist. He was mainly a landscape artist but he also painted religious compositions. He is further said to have painted copies of the works of Anthony van Dyck. As a landscape painter he is regarded as a follower of Jacques d'Arthois, an exponent of the Brussels school of landscape painters. He painted italianizing landscapes as well as wooded landscapes.

As was the practice in Antwerp at the time, he collaborated often with other painters such as the figure painter Peter Ykens and the still life painter Gaspar Peeter Verbruggen the Younger for whom he either painted the landscapes or the figures.
