= Henry of Coquet =

Saint Henry of Coquet

Hermit
- Died: 1127; Coquet Island, England
- Venerated in: Catholic Church
- Feast: 16 January

Henry of Coquet (died 1127) was a Dane who lived in a hermitage on Coquet Island, off the Northumberland coast.

== Life ==
A Dane of noble birth, Henry is said to have been directed by a vision to make good his escape from a marriage his parents were endeavouring to force upon him, and to serve God all his days as a hermit on Coquet. He landed at Tynemouth, and obtained the prior's consent to build a small cell on the island.

He died there in 1127. He is venerated as a saint in the Catholic Church. There is a stained glass window in the church of St Thomas of Canterbury in Deal, Kent, England, showing an image of 'St Henry the Dane'. He is wearing a horned helmet.
