= 1611 =

1611 in various calendars
- Gregorian calendar: 1611; MDCXI
- Ab urbe condita: 2364
- Armenian calendar: 1060; ԹՎ ՌԿ
- Assyrian calendar: 6361
- Balinese saka calendar: 1532–1533
- Bengali calendar: 1017–1018
- Berber calendar: 2561
- English Regnal year: 8 Ja. 1 – 9 Ja. 1
- Buddhist calendar: 2155
- Burmese calendar: 973
- Byzantine calendar: 7119–7120
- Chinese calendar: 庚戌年 (Metal Dog); 4308 or 4101 — to — 辛亥年 (Metal Pig); 4309 or 4102
- Coptic calendar: 1327–1328
- Discordian calendar: 2777
- Ethiopian calendar: 1603–1604
- Hebrew calendar: 5371–5372
- Hindu calendars
- Vikram Samvat: 1667–1668
- Shaka Samvat: 1532–1533
- Kali Yuga: 4711–4712
- Holocene calendar: 11611
- Igbo calendar: 611–612
- Iranian calendar: 989–990
- Islamic calendar: 1019–1020
- Japanese calendar: Keichō 16 (慶長１６年)
- Javanese calendar: 1531–1532
- Julian calendar: Gregorian minus 10 days
- Korean calendar: 3944
- Minguo calendar: 301 before ROC 民前301年
- Nanakshahi calendar: 143
- Thai solar calendar: 2153–2154
- Tibetan calendar: ལྕགས་ཕོ་ཁྱི་ལོ་ (male Iron-Dog); 1737 or 1356 or 584 — to — ལྕགས་མོ་ཕག་ལོ་ (female Iron-Boar); 1738 or 1357 or 585

1611 (MDCXI) was a common year starting on Saturday of the Gregorian calendar and a common year starting on Tuesday of the Julian calendar, the 1611th year of the Common Era (CE) and Anno Domini (AD) designations, the 611th year of the 2nd millennium, the 11th year of the 17th century, and the 2nd year of the 1610s decade. As of the start of 1611, the Gregorian calendar was 10 days ahead of the Julian calendar, which remained in localized use until 1923.

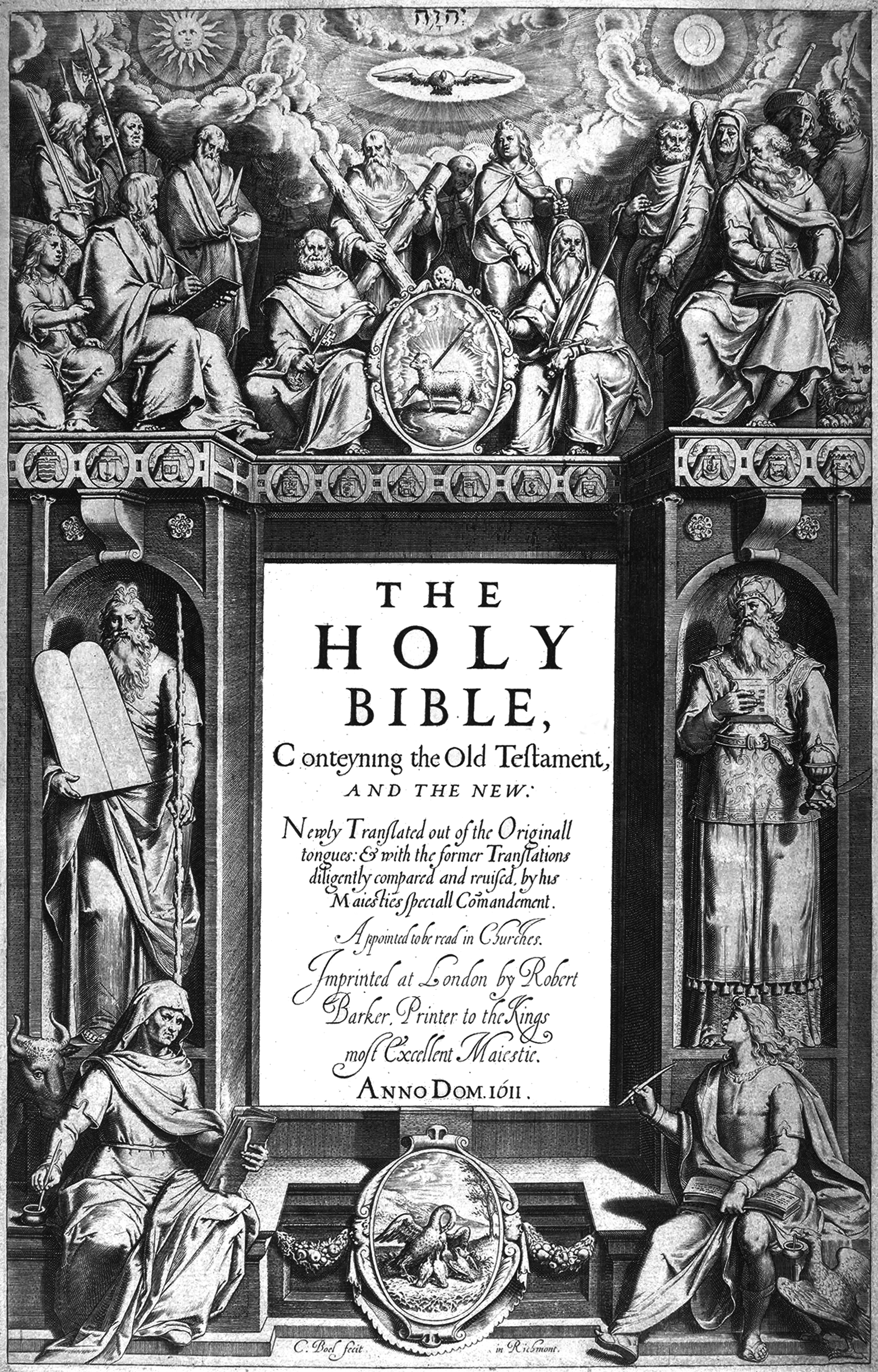
May 2: King James Version of the Bible first published

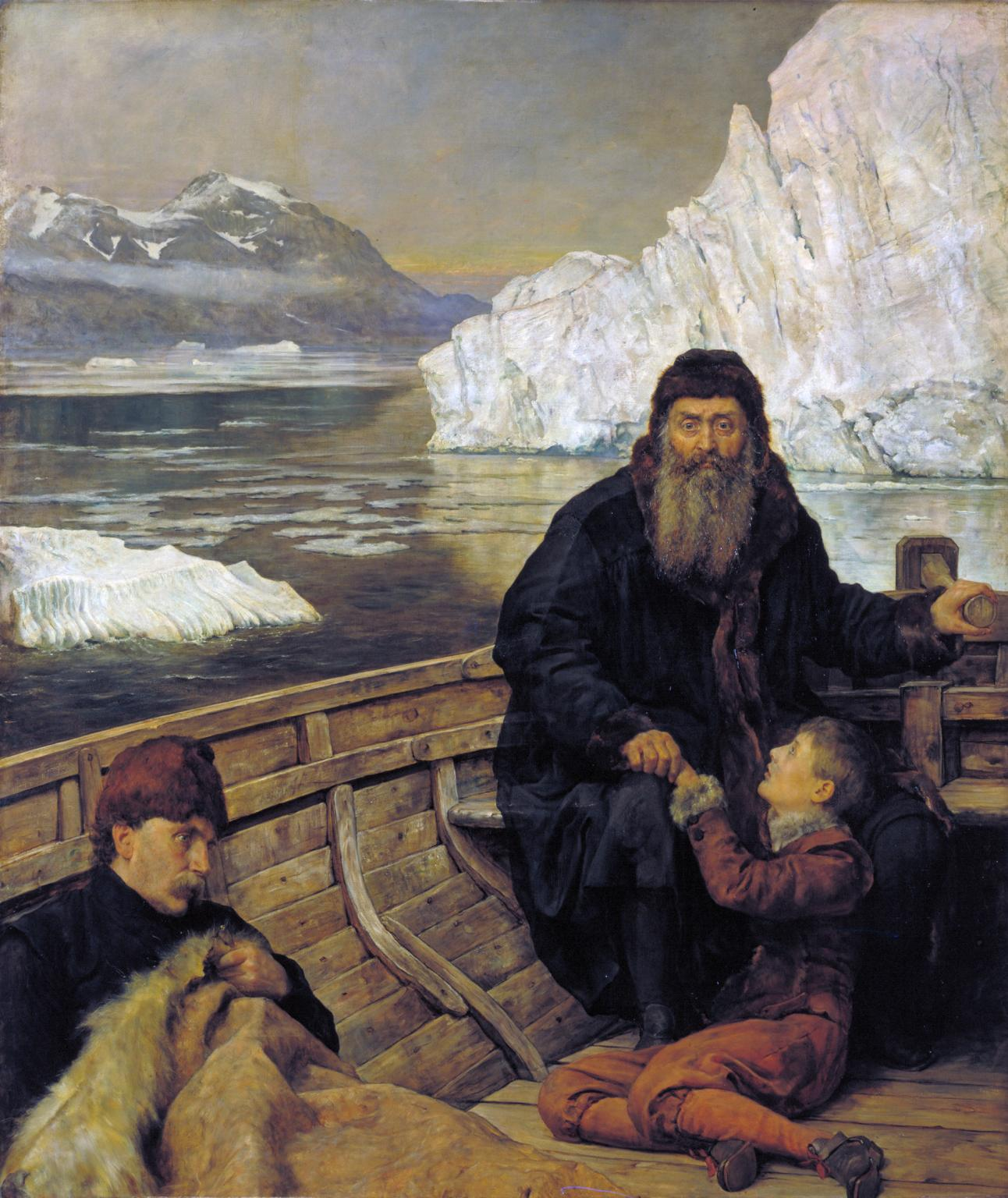
June 22: Explorer Henry Hudson and eight of his crew are abandoned at Hudson Bay after mutiny (pictured: The Last Voyage of Henry Hudson, painted by John Collier in 1881)

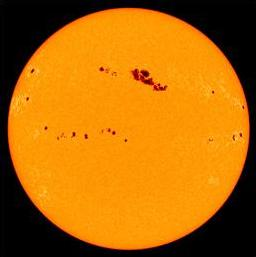
February 27: Sunspots are observed for the first time.

== Events ==
=== January–March ===
- January 26 – Maximilien de Béthune, Duke of Sully is forced by Queen regent Marie's Regency Council to resign as chief minister of France. He is replaced by Nicolas de Neufville, seigneur de Villeroy.
- February 27 – Sunspots are observed by telescope, by Frisian astronomers Johannes Fabricius and David Fabricius. Johannes publishes the results of these observations, in De Maculis in Sole observatis in Wittenberg, later this year. Such early discoveries are overlooked, however, and the first sighting is claimed a few months later, by Galileo Galilei and Christoph Scheiner.
- March 4 – George Abbot is enthroned as Archbishop of Canterbury in England.
- March 9 – Battle of Segaba in Begemder: Yemana Kristos, brother of Emperor of Ethiopia Susenyos I, ends the rebellion of Melka Sedeq.
- March 19–20 – The Moscow Uprising, an armed rising of the inhabitants of Moscow in the Tsardom of Russia against the military Polish–Lithuanian occupation of Moscow (Fall 1610–Fall 1612), results in the occupying forces starting a major fire in the city and the death of 6–7,000 Muscovites.

=== April–June ===
- April 4 – Denmark-Norway declares war on Sweden, then captures Kalmar.
- April 7 (March 28 O.S.) – False Dmitry III, the third pretender to the Russian throne to claim to be Prince Dmitry of Uglich, son of Ivan the Terrible, arrives at Ivangorod and proclaims himself as the Tsar Dmitry Ivanovich I.
- April 28 – The Colegio de Nuestra Señora del Santísimo Rosario is established in Manila, the Philippines (later renamed Colegio de Santo Tomas, and later still the University of Santo Tomas).
- April 30 – The priest implicated in the Aix-en-Provence possessions in France is executed.
- May 2 – The Authorised King James Version of the Bible is published for the first time, printed by Robert Barker in London.
- May 9 – At the age of 16, Emperor Go-Mizunoo succeeds his father Emperor Go-Yōzei as Emperor of Japan.
- May 11 – The first known performance of William Shakespeare's The Winter's Tale, probably new this year, is given at the Globe Theatre in London.
- May–December – Entrepreneur Thomas Sutton founds Charterhouse School, on the site of the old Carthusian monastery in Charterhouse Square, Smithfield, London.
- June 13 – The Siege of Smolensk in Russia by the Polish-Lithuanian Commonwealth succeeds after nearly two years of fighting that started on 29 September 1609. The conquest of the city is made possible by the discovery of a weakness in the walls of the fortress and the detonating of an explosive in a drainage canal.
- June 22 – English explorer and sea captain Henry Hudson, his teenage son John, and seven crewmen are set adrift in or near Hudson Bay, after a mutiny on his ship Discovery. They are never seen again.

=== July–September ===
- July 12 – The Perpetual Edict is proclaimed for the government of the Southern Netherlands (modern-day Belgium) by Archduke Albert VII and his wife Isabella, the joint rulers of the Austrian-controlled nation.
- July 17 – The army of the Swedish Empire commanded by Jacob De la Gardie captures the Russian city of Novgorod after a nine-day battle. Novgorod will remain Swedish territory for the next eight years.
- August 2 – Jamestown's Deputy Governor Sir Thomas Gates returns to Virginia with 280 people, provisions and cattle on six ships and assumes control, ruling that the fort must be strengthened.
- August 5 – Nasuh Pasha becomes the new grand vizier of the Ottoman Empire after the death of Kuyucu Murad Pasha.
- September 11 – Greek Orthodox bishop Dionysios Skylosophos leads an army of 700 men in a surprise attack on the city of Yanya (formerly the ancient Greek city of Ioannina) in an attempt to liberate the inhabitants from Ottoman Imperial rule. The Ottoman provincial governor, Osman Pasha, is forced to flee and his home is burned down, but Ottoman troops commanded by Aslan Pasha rout the rebels. Skylosophos is captured on September 14, then tortured to death in public.

=== October–December ===
- October 30 – At the age of 16, Gustav II Adolf succeeds his father Charles IX as King of Sweden.
- November 1 – At Whitehall Palace in London, William Shakespeare's last solo play, The Tempest, is given its earliest reported performance.
- December 2 (Keichō 16, 10th month, 28th day) – The 1611 Sanriku earthquake of 8.1 magnitude strikes off of the coast of Japan and causes a tsunami that kills almost 5,000 people in the northern section of Honshu island.
- December 5 (30 Ramadan 1020 A.H.) – To celebrate the end of the daily fasting of the month of Ramadan, the Mughal Empire Army commander, Mubariz Khan, hosts the celebration banquet and learns that Pashtun rebel leader Khwaja Usman and 250 of his men have evacuated Bokainagar (modern-day Gouripur in Bangladesh) during the Mughal Army's holiday observance.
- December – The week-long Conquest of Bakla leads to the fall of the Chandradwip kingdom and the Mughal annexation of Barisal into the Bengal Subah

=== Date unknown ===
- At Jamestown, John Rolfe imports tobacco seeds from the island of Trinidad (Nicotiana tabacum); the native tobacco is Nicotiana rustica.
- Thomas Dale founds the city of Henricus on the James River, with the assistance of 350 men, a few miles south of present day Richmond, Virginia.
- Famine in Ethiopia resulting from crop failure in the north due to weather conditions and the outbreak of a plague.
- Construction begins on Naqsh-e Jahan Square in Isfahan, Persia.
- Itoh Gofuku, a predecessor of Matsuzakaya, a famous department store, is founded for the sale of silk in Nagoya, Japan.

== Births ==
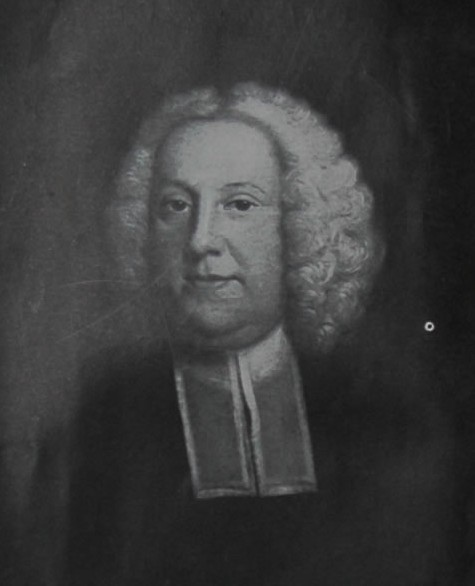
John Pell

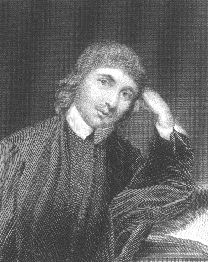
William Cartwright

=== January–March ===
- January 3 – James Harrington, English political theorist of classical republicanism (d. 1677)
- January 5 – Tsarevich Ivan Dmitriyevich, pretender to the Russian throne (k. 1614)
- January 28 – Johannes Hevelius, Polish astronomer (d. 1687)
- February 2 – Ulrik of Denmark, Danish prince-bishop (d. 1633)
- February 3 – Christian Ulrik Gyldenløve, Danish diplomat and military officer (d. 1640)
- February 5 (bapt.) – Philip Sherman, English-born founder of Rhode Island (d. 1687)
- February 6 – Chongzhen Emperor of China (d. 1644)
- February 19 – Andries de Graeff, Dutch politician (d. 1678)
- February 24? (bapt. March 4) – William Dobson, English portrait painter (d. 1646)
- February 28 – William Brereton, 2nd Baron Brereton, English politician (d. 1664)
- March 1 – John Pell, English mathematician (d. 1685)
- March 9 – Pierre-Joseph-Marie Chaumonot, French missionary (d. 1693)
- March 15 – Jan Fyt, Flemish Baroque painter (d. 1661)
- March 17 – Robert Douglas, Count of Skenninge, Swedish field marshal (d. 1662)
- March 25 – Evliya Çelebi, Ottoman Turk, travels around the Ottoman Empire for 40 years (d. 1682)
- March 28
  - Magdalena Elisabeth of Hanau, German noblewoman (d. 1687)
  - Henry Sherburne, American colonist (d. 1680)

=== April–June ===
- April 11 – Karl Eusebius, Prince of Liechtenstein (d. 1684)
- April 17 – Simone Pignoni, Italian painter (d. 1698)
- May 4 – Carlo Rainaldi, Italian architect (d. 1691)
- May 16 – Pope Innocent XI (d. 1689)
- May 19 – Joachim Irgens von Westervick, Dano–Norwegian noble (d. 1675)
- June 15 – Salomon Sweers, Dutch businessman (d. 1674)
- June 22 – Pablo Bruna, blind Spanish composer and organist (d. 1679)
- June 24 – Johan Oxenstierna, Swedish count and statesman (d. 1657)
- June 28 – Robert Rich, 3rd Earl of Warwick, English noble (d. 1659)

=== July–September ===
- July 15 – Jai Singh I, Maharaja of Jaipur (d. 1667)
- July 16 – Cecilia Renata of Austria, queen consort of Poland (d. 1644)
- July 21 – Jan van Balen, Flemish painter (d. 1654)
- July 23 – Henry Hungerford, English politician (d. 1673)
- July 24 – Giancarlo de' Medici, Italian Catholic cardinal (d. 1663)
- August 4 – Jan van den Hoecke, Dutch painter (d. 1651)
- August 9 – Henry of Nassau-Siegen, German count, officer in the Dutch Army, diplomat for the Dutch Republic (d. 1652)
- September 1 – William Cartwright, English dramatist (d. 1643)
- September 3 – Toussaint Rose, French writer (d. 1701)
- September 4 – George III of Brieg, Duke of Brzeg (1633–1664) (d. 1664)
- September 8 – Johann Friedrich Gronovius, German classical scholar (d. 1671)
- September 11 – Henri de la Tour d'Auvergne, Vicomte de Turenne (d. 1675)
- September 17 – Johann Olearius, German hymnwriter (d. 1684)

=== October–December ===
- October 1 – Mathias Balen, Dutch writer (d. 1691)
- October 11
  - Samuel Enys, English politician (d. 1697)
  - Hugues de Lionne, French statesman (d. 1671)
- October 22 – Jacques Esprit, French writer (d. 1677)
- October 26
  - Ove Bjelke, Norwegian civil servant (d. 1674)
  - Antonio Coello, Spanish dramatist and poet (d. 1652)
- November 1
  - François-Marie, comte de Broglie, French soldier and commander in the Thirty Years' War (d. 1656)
  - Walter J. Johnson, English explorer and fur trader (d. 1703)
- November 12 – Joachim Gersdorff, Danish politician (d. 1661)
- November 18 – Andreas Tscherning, German poet (d. 1659)
- December 23 – Abraham Wright, English theological writer and deacon (d. 1690)
- December – Leonora Baroni, Italian singer (d. 1670)

=== Date unknown ===
- Diego Quispe Tito, Peruvian painter (d. 1681)

=== Probable ===
- Charles de Batz-Castelmore d'Artagnan, French count and musketeer, on whom the fictional character from the novel The Three Musketeers is based (d. 1673)

== Deaths ==
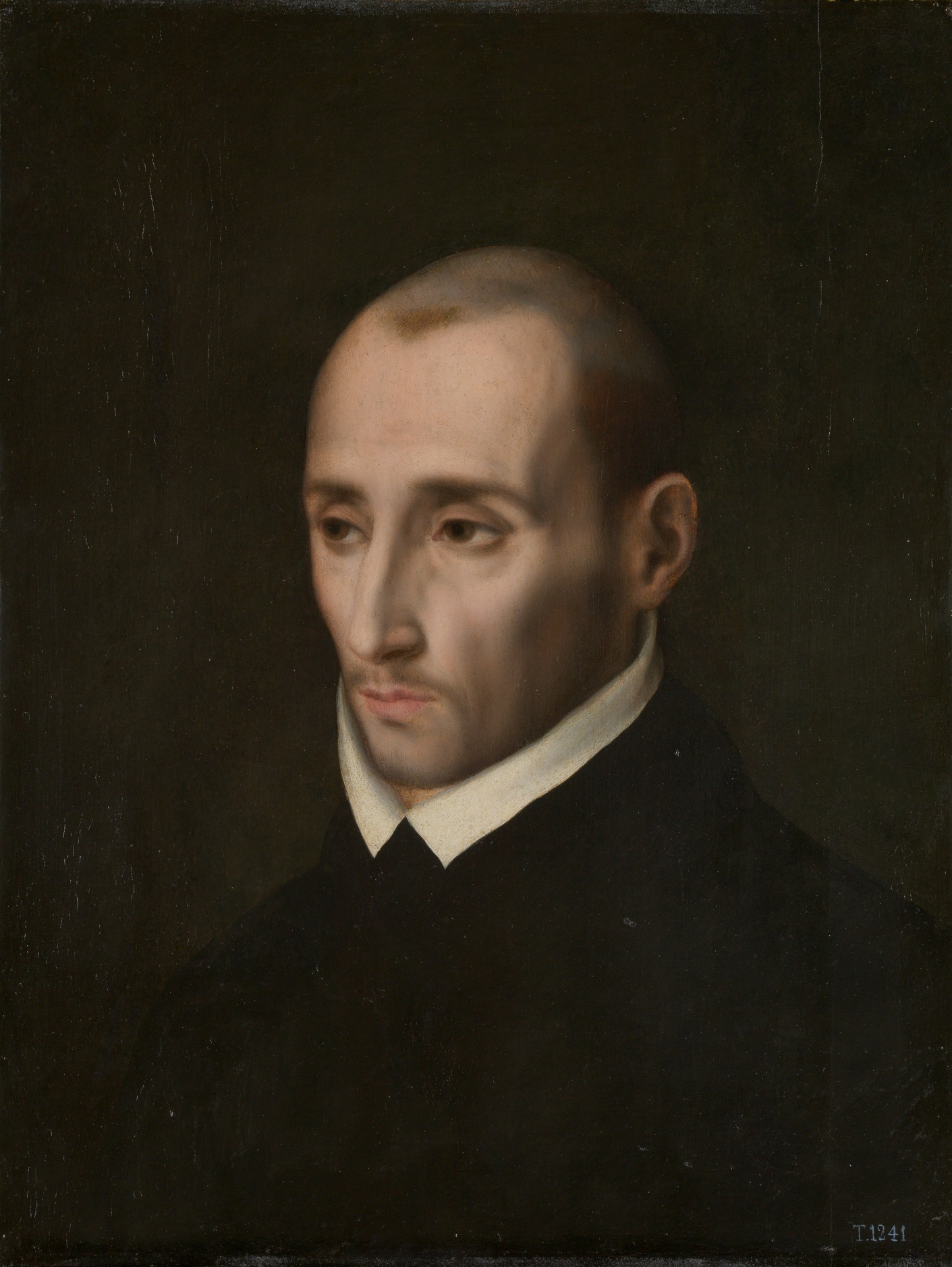
Juan de Ribera

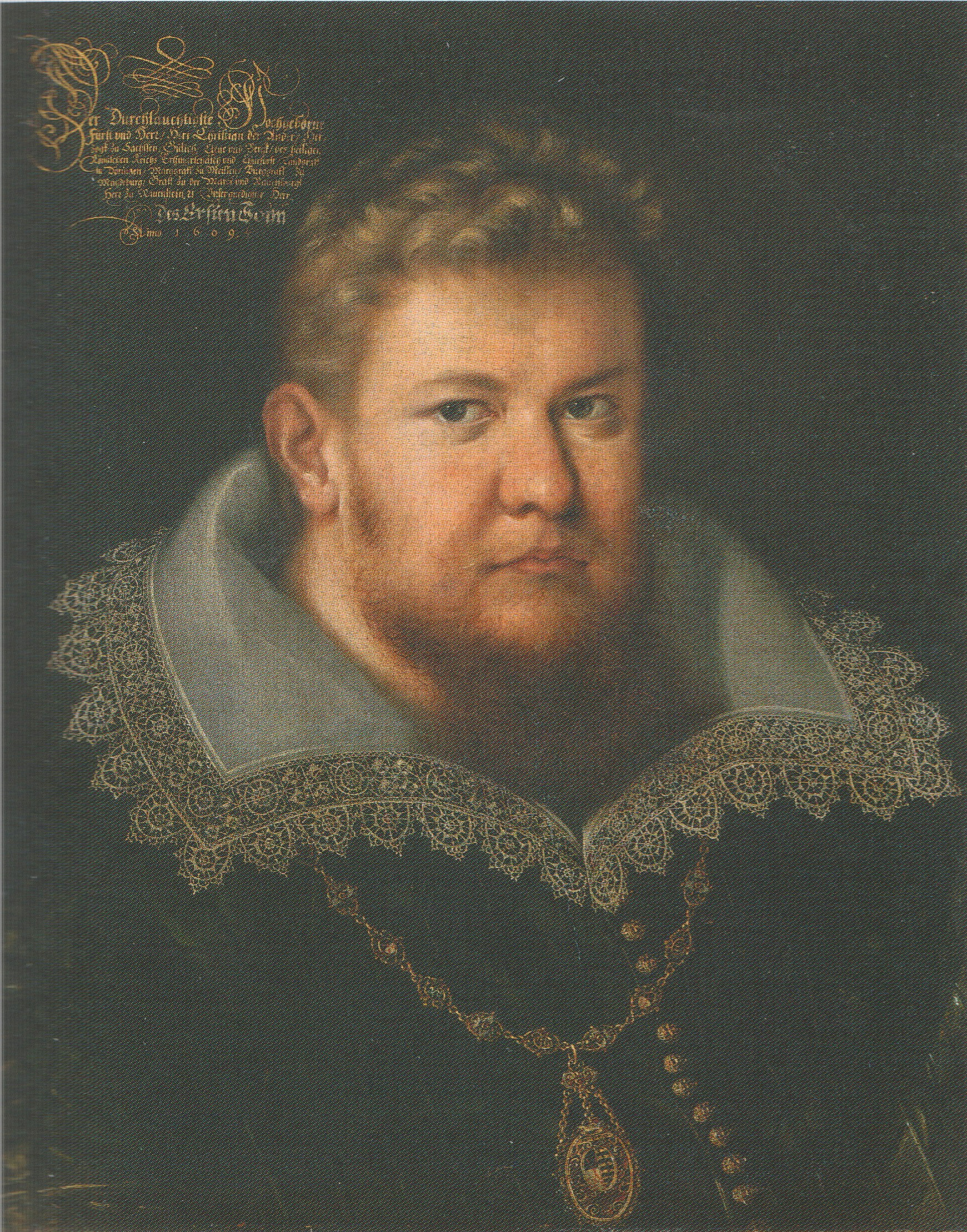
Christian II, Elector of Saxony

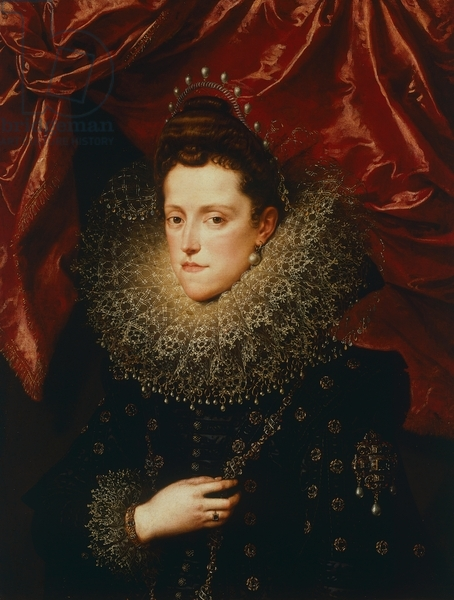
Eleanor de' Medici

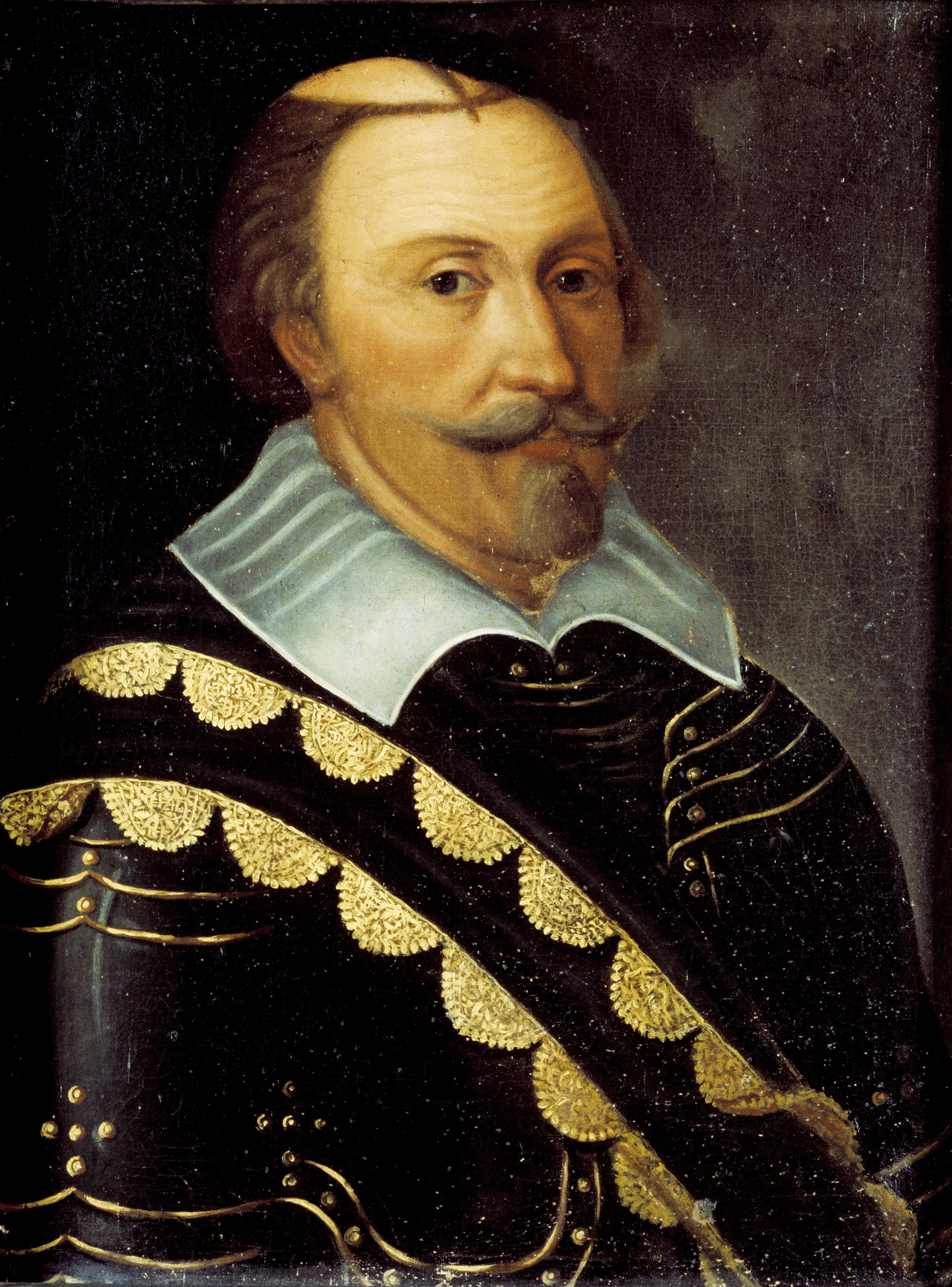
Charles IX of Sweden

=== January–March ===
- January 6 – Juan de Ribera, Spanish Catholic archbishop (b. 1532)
- January 16 – Niiro Tadamoto, Japanese samurai (b. 1526)
- February 7 – Ruprecht von Eggenberg, Austrian general (b. 1546)
- February 12 – Henry Lee of Ditchley, English noble (b. 1533)
- February 26 – Antonio Possevino, Italian Jesuit protagonist of Counter Reformation, papal diplomat (b. 1533)
- March 2 – Ernest II, Duke of Brunswick-Lüneburg, (b. 1564)
- March 3 – William Douglas, 10th Earl of Angus, son of William Douglas (b. 1552)
- March 5 – Shimazu Yoshihisa, Japanese warlord and samurai (b. 1533)
- March 13 – Louis III, Count of Löwenstein since 1541 (b. 1530)
- March 17 – Princess Sophia of Sweden (b. 1547)
- March 20 – Johann Georg Gödelmann, German demonologist (b. 1559)

=== April–June ===
- April 23 – Martin Ruland the Younger, German alchemist (b. 1569)
- May 19
  - Frederick IX, Margrave of Brandenburg, Grand Master of the Order of Saint John (b. 1588)
  - Zhu Zaiyu, Chinese mathematician, music theorist (b. 1536)
- June 8 – Jean Bertaut, French poet (b. 1552)
- June 23 – Christian II, Elector of Saxony (b. 1583)

=== July–September ===
- July 9 – János Imreffy, Hungarian politician (b. 1559)
- July 26 – Horio Yoshiharu, Japanese warlord (b. 1542)
- August – Antoni Clarassó i Terès, Spanish priest
- August 2 – Katō Kiyomasa, Japanese warlord and samurai (b. 1561)
- August 9 – John Blagrave, English mathematician (b. 1561)
- August 12 – Herman van den Bergh, Dutch soldier in the Eighty Years' War (b. 1558)
- August 27 – Tomás Luis de Victoria, Spanish composer (b. c. 1548)
- September 9 – Eleanor de' Medici, Italian noblewoman (b. 1567)
- September 17 – Johannes Corputius, Dutch engineer, cartographer and military leader (b. 1542)
- September 18 – John Augustus, Count Palatine of Lützelstein, German count (b. 1575)
- September 25 – Šurhaci, Chinese prince (b. 1564)

=== October–December ===
- October 3
  - Margaret of Austria, Queen of Spain (b. 1584)
  - Charles of Lorraine, Duke of Mayenne, French military leader (b. 1554)
- October 11 – Thomas Blague, English priest and writer (b. 1545)
- October 30 – King Charles IX of Sweden (b. 1550)
- November 6 – Peter Vok, Czech noble (b. 1539)
- November 17 – Nicolas Henri, Duke of Orléans, French duke (b. 1607)
- November 22 – Thomas Berkeley, English politician (b. 1575)

=== Date unknown ===
- Camillo Mariani, Italian sculptor (b. 1565)
- Tiryaki Hasan Pasha, Turkish beylerbey (b. 1530)
- Henry Hudson, English explorer
