= Harrod =

Harrod may refer to:

== People with the surname Harrod ==
- Billa Harrod (1911–2005), British architectural conservationist, wife of Roy
- Charles Digby Harrod (1841–1905), British retailer, son of Charles Henry
- Charles Henry Harrod (1799–1885), British retailer
- Henry Harrod (1817–1871), English antiquarian
- James Harrod (c. 1746—c. 1792), Kentucky pioneer
- Jeffrey Harrod (born 1935), English writer and essayist on politics
- Roy Harrod (1900–1978), English economist
- Tim Harrod (born 1968), American comedy writer
- William Harrod (1753–1819), English printer and antiquary

== Given name ==
- Harrod Blank (born 1963), American documentary filmmaker

== Places ==
- Harrod, Ohio, a village
- Ephram Harrod House in North Middletown, Kentucky; NRHP-listed

== See also ==
- Harrods, a department store in Knightsbridge, London
- Harrop (disambiguation)
- Herod (disambiguation)
- Herrod
- Garrod
