= 1699 in literature =

This article contains information about the literary events and publications of 1699.

== Events ==
- January 27 – Jonathan Swift is out of work after his employer, Sir William Temple, dies, leaving Swift £100.
- May 4 – The beginning of the fictional Gulliver's Travels (1726).
- June 1 – Joseph Addison receives a grant or pension from the Crown, enabling him to travel abroad.

== New books ==
=== Prose ===
- Richard Bentley – A Dissertation upon the Epistles of Phalaris (prev. pub. in William Wotton's Reflections upon Ancient and Modern Learning)
- Samuel Clarke
  - Some Reflections on that part of a book called Amyntor, or a Defence of Milton's Life, which relates to the Writings of the Primitive Fathers, and the Canon of the New Testament
  - Three Practical Essays on Baptism, Confirmation and Repentance
- Jeremy Collier – A Defence of the Short View of the Profaneness and Immorality of the English Stage (see 1698 in literature)
- Anne Dacier (Anne Lefèvre) – Homer's Iliad (prose, first translation into French)
- William Dampier – Voyages and Descriptions (vol. ii)
- John Dunton – The Dublin Scuffle
- George Farquhar – The Adventures of Covent-Garden
- François Fénelon (anonymously) – Les Aventures de Télémaque ("The Adventures of Telemachus")
- Samuel Garth – The Dispensary (satire by one of Pope's mentors)
- John Hughes – The Court of Neptune
- George Keith – The Deism of William Penn, and his Brethren
- William King
  - Dialogues of the Dead (in support of Charles Boyle)
  - The Furmetary
  - A Journey to London
- Gerard Langbaine – The Lives and Characters of the English Dramatick Poets (cont. by Charles Gildon)
- Roger L'Estrange – Fables and Storyes Moralized
- John Locke – Mr Locke's Reply to the Right Revered the Lord Bishop of Worcester's Answer to his Second Letter (see 1697 in literature)
- Cornelius Nary – The Chief Points in Controversy between the Catholics and the Protestants
- Frances Norton – Reliquae Gethinianae
- John Oldmixon – Reflections on the Stage, and Mr Collier's Defence of the Short View
- Nicolas Steno (Niels Stenson) – De solido intra solidum naturaliter contento dissertationis prodromus (Preliminary Discourse to a Dissertation on a Solid Body Naturally Contained within a Solid)
- William Temple – Letters Written by Sir William Temple During his Being Ambassador at The Hague (edited initially by Jonathan Swift)
- John Toland
  - The Life of John Milton
  - Amyntor; or, A Defence of Milton's Life
- Thomas Traherne – A Serious and Pathetical Contemplation of the Mercies of God
- William Wake – The Principles of the Christian Religion Explained
- Ned Ward – A Trip to New-England
- James Wright – Historia Histrionica

=== Poetry ===
- Thomas Brown – A Collection of Miscellany Poems, Letters, etc.
- Thomas D'Urfey – A Choice Collection of New Songs and Ballads
- John Pomfret – The Choice
- Nahum Tate – Elegies

=== Drama ===
- Abel Boyer – Achilles, or Iphegenia in Aulis
- Colley Cibber – Xerxes
- John Dennis – Rinaldo and Armida
- George Farquhar – The Constant Couple
- Charles Gildon – Measure for Measure, or Beauty the Best Advocate (a re-adaptation of Davenant's 1662 adaptation The Law Against Lovers)
- Joseph Harris – Love's a Lottery, and a Woman the Prize
- Charles Hopkins – Friendship Improved
- Peter Anthony Motteux – The Island Princess; or, The Generous Portuguese (opera, adapted from John Fletcher)
- Mary Pix – The False Friend

== Births ==
- April 17 – Robert Blair, Scottish poet (died 1746)
- April 28 – Joseph Spence, English literary historian (died 1768)
- June 26 – Madame Geoffrin, French salonnière (died 1777)
- August 13 (bapt.) – John Dyer, Welsh poet (died 1757)
- December 29 – Friedrich Ludwig Abresch, German-born Dutch philologist (died 1782)

== Deaths ==
- January 21 – Obadiah Walker, English religious writer and controversialist (born 1616)
- January 27 – Sir William Temple, English statesman and essayist (born 1628)
- March 24 – John Evelyn the Younger, English translator (born 1655)
- March 27 – Edward Stillingfleet, English theologian (born 1635)
- April 21 – Jean Racine, French dramatist (born 1639)
- April 22
  - Hans Erasmus Aßmann, Freiherr von Abschatz, German statesman and poet (born 1646)
  - Lady Anne Halkett, English memoirist (born 1623)
- November 23 – Joseph Beaumont, English clergyman, academic and poet (born 1616)
- December 16 – Erhard Weigel, German philosopher and mathematician (born 1625)
