= Harrop =

Harrop may refer to:

== Surname ==
- Brett Harrop (born 1979), Australian cricketer
- Bobby Harrop (1936–2007), English footballer
- Douglas Harrop (born 1947), English cricketer
- Emily Harrop (born 1997), French ski mountaineer
- Froma Harrop (born 1950), American journalist and author
- George A. Harrop (1890–1945), American physician, nutritionist and writer
- J. Harrop (fl. 1874), English cricketer
- Jimmy Harrop (1884–1954), English footballer
- John James Harrop (1910–1988), accountant and political figure in Saskatchewan
- Josh Harrop (born 1995), English footballer
- Kerys Harrop (born 1990), English footballer
- K.O. Harrop (1947-2019), Guyanese-born poet, author and civil engineer
- Les Harrop (born 1948), English and Australian writer, editor, and teacher
- Loretta Harrop (born 1975), Australian triathlete
- Max Harrop (born 1993), English footballer
- Trevor Harrop (1927–2022), British swimmer
- William Hulton-Harrop (1906–1979), British Army officer
- William Harrop (RAF officer), British World War I flying ace
- William C. Harrop (1929–2025), American diplomat

== Other ==
- Harrop formula, formula in intuitionistic logic
- Dyson–Harrop satellite, hypothetical megastructure intended for power generation, using the solar wind
- Harrop Island, small island off Enderby Land, Antarctica
- Harrop, a community in British Columbia, Canada
