= Herodian (disambiguation) =

Herodian (c. 170 – c. 240) was a Roman civil servant who wrote History of the Empire from the Death of Marcus.

Herodian may also refer to:

- Aelius Herodianus, grammarian
- Herodian dynasty, a royal dynasty of Idumaean (Edomite) descent
  - Herodian Kingdom of Judea, a client state of the Roman Republic from 37 BCE to 4 BCE
  - Herodian Tetrarchy, 4 BCE to 44 CE
- Herodian of Patras, one of the Seventy Disciples and bishop of Patras
- Herodians, a sect of Hellenistic Jews mentioned in the New Testament
- Herodian (commander), a Byzantine army officer

== See also ==
- Herod (disambiguation)
