= Herrod =

Herrod is a surname. Notable people with the surname include:

- Bob Herrod (1866−1918), English footballer
- Christopher Herrod (born 1965), American politician
- Darryl Herrod (born 1945), Australian rules footballer
- Jeff Herrod (born 1966), American football player
- Nicholas Herrod (born 1990), science teacher, Canadian scientist celebrity, lives in Kent

== See also ==
- Herod (disambiguation)
- Harrod (disambiguation)
