= 1677 =

1677 in various calendars
- Gregorian calendar: 1677; MDCLXXVII
- Ab urbe condita: 2430
- Armenian calendar: 1126; ԹՎ ՌՃԻԶ
- Assyrian calendar: 6427
- Balinese saka calendar: 1598–1599
- Bengali calendar: 1083–1084
- Berber calendar: 2627
- English Regnal year: 28 Cha. 2 – 29 Cha. 2
- Buddhist calendar: 2221
- Burmese calendar: 1039
- Byzantine calendar: 7185–7186
- Chinese calendar: 丙辰年 (Fire Dragon); 4374 or 4167 — to — 丁巳年 (Fire Snake); 4375 or 4168
- Coptic calendar: 1393–1394
- Discordian calendar: 2843
- Ethiopian calendar: 1669–1670
- Hebrew calendar: 5437–5438
- Hindu calendars
- Vikram Samvat: 1733–1734
- Shaka Samvat: 1598–1599
- Kali Yuga: 4777–4778
- Holocene calendar: 11677
- Igbo calendar: 677–678
- Iranian calendar: 1055–1056
- Islamic calendar: 1087–1088
- Japanese calendar: Enpō 5 (延宝５年)
- Javanese calendar: 1599–1600
- Julian calendar: Gregorian minus 10 days
- Korean calendar: 4010
- Minguo calendar: 235 before ROC 民前235年
- Nanakshahi calendar: 209
- Thai solar calendar: 2219–2220
- Tibetan calendar: མེ་ཕོ་འབྲུག་ལོ་ (male Fire-Dragon); 1803 or 1422 or 650 — to — མེ་མོ་སྦྲུལ་ལོ་ (female Fire-Snake); 1804 or 1423 or 651

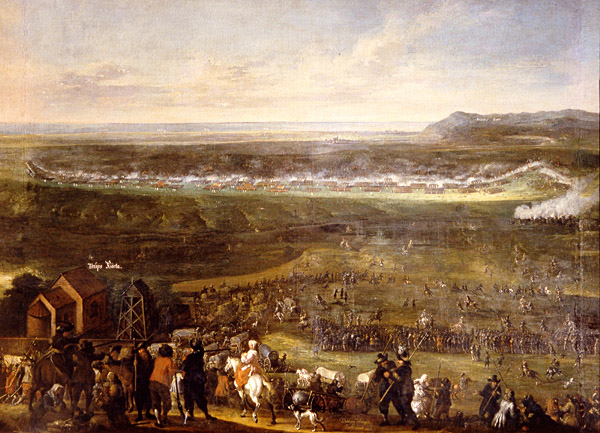
July 14: At the Battle of Landskrona, King Charles XI of Sweden leads defense of kingdom from invasion force from Denmark's King Christian V.

1677 (MDCLXXVII) was a common year starting on Friday of the Gregorian calendar and a common year starting on Monday of the Julian calendar, the 1677th year of the Common Era (CE) and Anno Domini (AD) designations, the 677th year of the 2nd millennium, the 77th year of the 17th century, and the 8th year of the 1670s decade. As of the start of 1677, the Gregorian calendar was 10 days ahead of the Julian calendar, which remained in localized use until 1923.

== Events ==
=== January–March ===
- January 1 – Jean Racine's tragedy Phèdre is first performed, in Paris.
- January 21 – The first medical publication in America (a pamphlet on smallpox) is produced in Boston.
- February 15 – Four members of the English House of Lords embarrass King Charles II at the opening of the latest session of the "Cavalier Parliament" by proclaiming that the session is not legitimate because it had not met in more than a year. The Duke of Buckingham, backed by Lord Shaftesbury, Lord Salisbury and Baron Wharton, makes an unsuccessful motion to end the session. When the four Lords refuse to apologize, they are arrested and imprisoned in the Tower of London.
- February 26
  - The first arrests are made in the case that will develop into the "Affair of the Poisons" in France, as Magdelaine de La Grange and her accused accomplice, Father Nail, are detained on suspicion of poisoning her lover, a Messr. Faurie. While in prison in the Bastille and awaiting trial Mademoiselle La Grange writes letters accusing other persons of carrying out murders by poison as well.
  - On the Indonesian island of Java, Amangkurat II of the Mataram Sultanate agrees to bring his kingdom under the protection of the Dutch East India Company to drive out rebels.
- February 28 – During the Franco-Dutch War, the Siege of Valenciennes by the French Army begins in the Spanish Netherlands (modern-day Belgium). The city surrenders on March 17.
- March 17 – Franco-Dutch War: Siege of Valenciennes (1676–77) in the Spanish Netherlands ends with surrender of the town to the French.

=== April–June ===
- April 6 – Leopold I, Holy Roman Emperor visits the University of Innsbruck.
- April 11 – Franco-Dutch War: Battle of Cassel – A French force under Philippe I, Duke of Orléans, defeats a combined Dutch-Spanish force under William of Orange in French Flanders.
- April 16 – The Statute of Frauds is passed into English law.
- May 29 – The Treaty of Middle Plantation establishes peace between the Virginia colonists and the local Indians.
- May 31 – Scanian War: Battle of Møn – Danish ships clash with a Swedish fleet under Niels Juel, between Fehmarn and Warnemünde; the Danish defeat the Swedish and capture a number of ships.
- June 25–26 – Scanian War: Siege of Malmö – Danish attackers fail to take the town from the Swedish.

=== July–September ===
- July 14 – Battle of Landskrona: Sweden and its 13,000 troops, under the command of King Charles XI, successfully repel a 12,000-man invasion force from Denmark, commanded by King Christian V.
- August 14 – William of Orange, the leader of the Dutch Republic, is forced to end the siege of the Spanish Netherlands (modern-day Belgium) city of Charleroi after six days.
- August 28 – During war between the Russian Empire and the Ottoman Empire, Russian troops led by Grigory Romodanovsky and Ukrainian Cossacks led by Ivan Samoylovych arrive at the besieged Ukrainian city of Chigirin (modern-day Chyhyryn) and inflict heavy casualties on the encamped Turkish and Tatar troops. Ibrahim Pasha, leader of the 45,000 member Ottoman force, retreats the next day and, by the time of the relief of Chigirin on September 5, the Ottoman Army has lost 20,000 men. Ottoman Sultan Mehmed IV, outraged by the defeat, sends 200,000 troops the following year and destroys the city.
- August – The French guild of the Maitresses bouquetieres is founded in Paris.
- September 10 – Henry Purcell is appointed a musician to the court of Charles II of England.
- September 17 – Troops from Denmark invade and capture the Swedish island of Rügen and drive out the local population. Five months later, on January 18, 1678, Sweden recaptures the island. Nine months later, troops from Denmark and Brandenburg invade for a third time and capture the island again on October 22, 1678. Eight months later, Denmark is given the island back under a treaty ending the Swedish-Brandenburg War on June 29, but by then, the island of Rügen is in ruins. In modern times, the island becomes a vacation resort in Germany.
- September 18 – the Kangxi Emperor of China grants titles and ranks to all of his wives, and names Empress Xiaozhaoren as his consort.

=== October–December ===
- October 29 – Michel le Tellier becomes Chancellor of France.
- November 4 – The future Mary II of England marries William of Orange in London.
- November 16 – French troops occupy Freiburg.
- December 7 – Father Louis Hennepin of Belgium, exploring North America, becomes the earliest known European person to discover Niagara Falls, and the first to report its existence. In his book A New Discovery of a Vast Country in America, published in 1698, Hennepin writes "Betwixt the lakes Ontario and Eire there is a vast prodigious Cadence of water which falls down after a surprising and astonishing manner, inasmuch that the Universe does not afford its parallel."
- December 9 – The French Navy, led by Charles de Courbon de Blénac with a land force of 950 men, lands at the Caribbean island of Tobago, lays siege to the Dutch fort defending the territory during the Franco-Dutch War, and destroys the structure when it fires a cannon overlooking the fort, striking the gunpowder arsenal. The explosion kills 250 of the defenders, including Dutch Admiral Jacob Binckes and 16 officers. Combined with the sinking of four ships of the Netherlands Navy, the victory at Tobago ends Dutch military power in the Antilles.
- December 15 – The Siege of Stettin (the modern-day Polish city of Szczecin but, at this time, a possession of Sweden) ends after almost five months with Sweden's surrender of the city to Prussia's Frederick William, Elector of Brandenburg. The siege, part of the Scanian War, had begun on June 25.

=== Date unknown ===
- Yusuf Bey is replaced as sanjak-bey of Lajjun Sanjak by an Ottoman officer, ending the power of the Turabay dynasty.
- The Second London Baptist Confession of Faith is written (published in 1689).
- Spinoza's Ethics (Ethica, ordine geometrico demonstrata) is published as part of his Opera Posthuma in Amsterdam.
- Robert Plot publishes The Natural History of Oxford-shire, Being an Essay Toward the Natural History of England, in which he describes the fossilised femur of a human giant, now known to be from the dinosaur Megalosaurus.
- Elias Ashmole gifts the collection that begins the Ashmolean Museum to the University of Oxford in England.
- Jules Hardouin Mansart begins la place Vendôme in Paris (it is completed in 1698).
- Francis Aungier, 3rd Baron Aungier of Longford, is created 1st Earl of Longford in the Peerage of Ireland.
- The John Roan School is established in Greenwich, London.
- Gottfried Wilhelm Leibniz gives a complete solution to the tangent problem.
- Antonie van Leeuwenhoek observes spermatozoa under the microscope.
- The use of male impotence is ended as a factor in French divorce proceedings.
- Ice cream becomes popular in Paris.
- The population of Paris first exceeds 500,000.

== Births ==
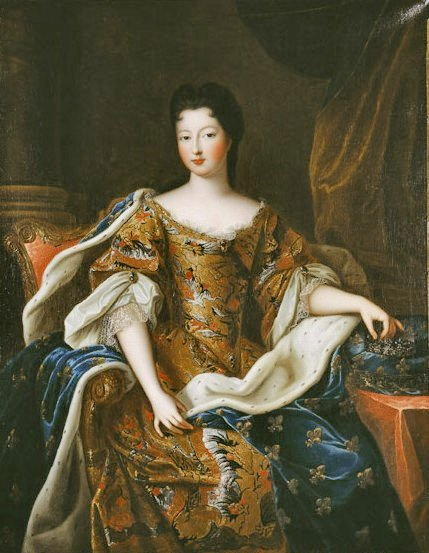
Françoise Marie de Bourbon

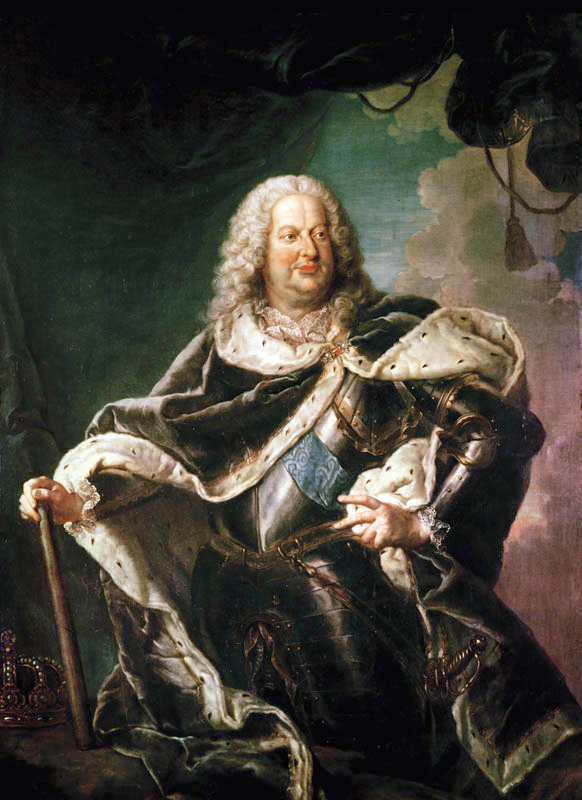
King Stanisław Leszczyński

- February 3 – Jan Santini Aichel, Czech architect (d. 1723)
- February 4 – Johann Ludwig Bach, German composer (d. 1731)
- February 8 – Jacques Cassini, French astronomer (d. 1756)
- May 4 – Françoise Marie de Bourbon, youngest daughter of Louis XIV (d. 1749)
- August 27 – Otto Ferdinand von Abensperg und Traun, Austrian field marshal (d. 1748)
- September 17 – Stephen Hales, English physiologist, chemist, and inventor (d. 1761)
- October 20 – Stanisław Leszczyński, King of Poland (d. 1766)
- date unknown
  - William Dummer, acting Governor of the Massachusetts Bay Colony (d. 1761)

== Deaths ==
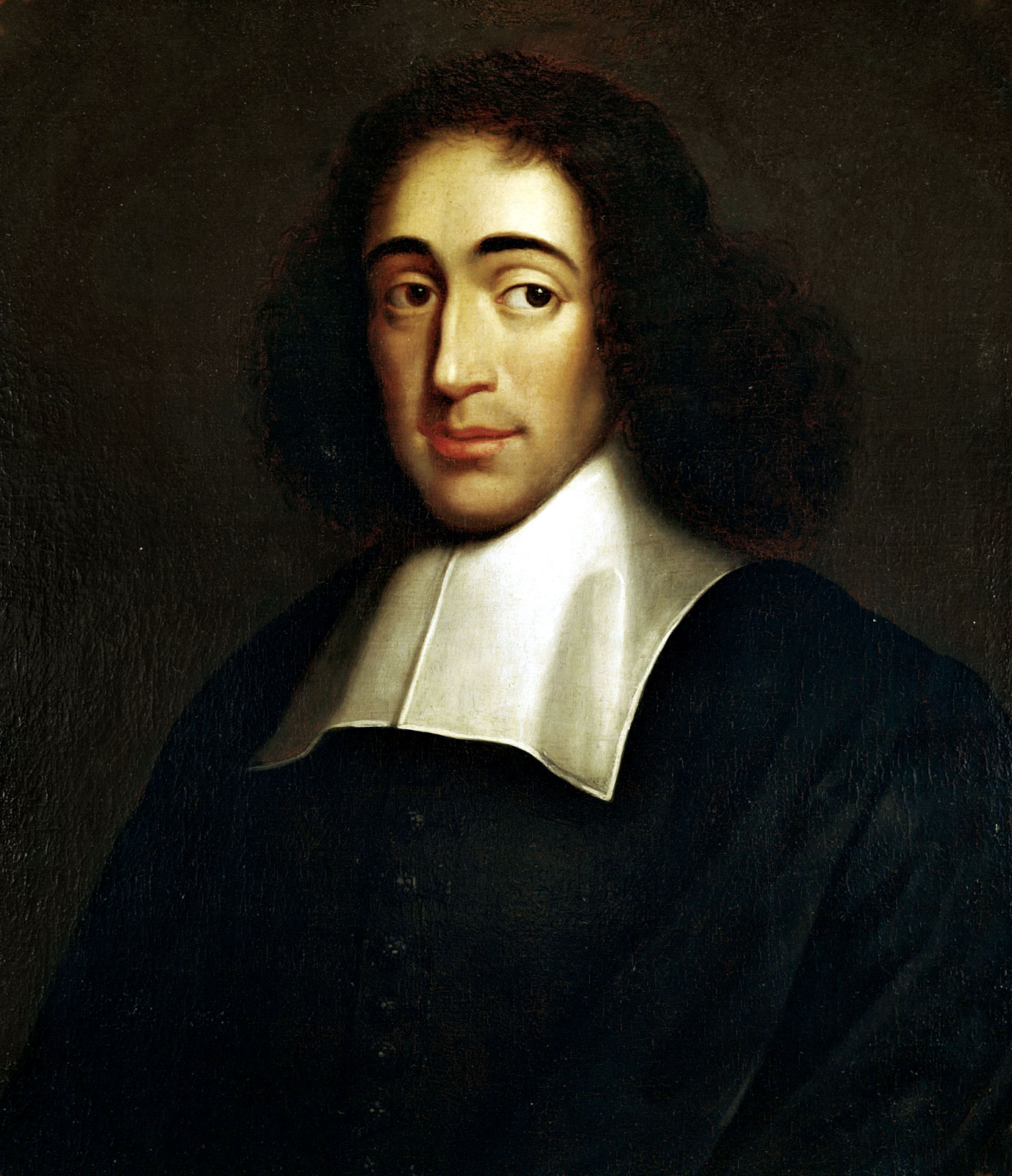
Baruch Spinoza

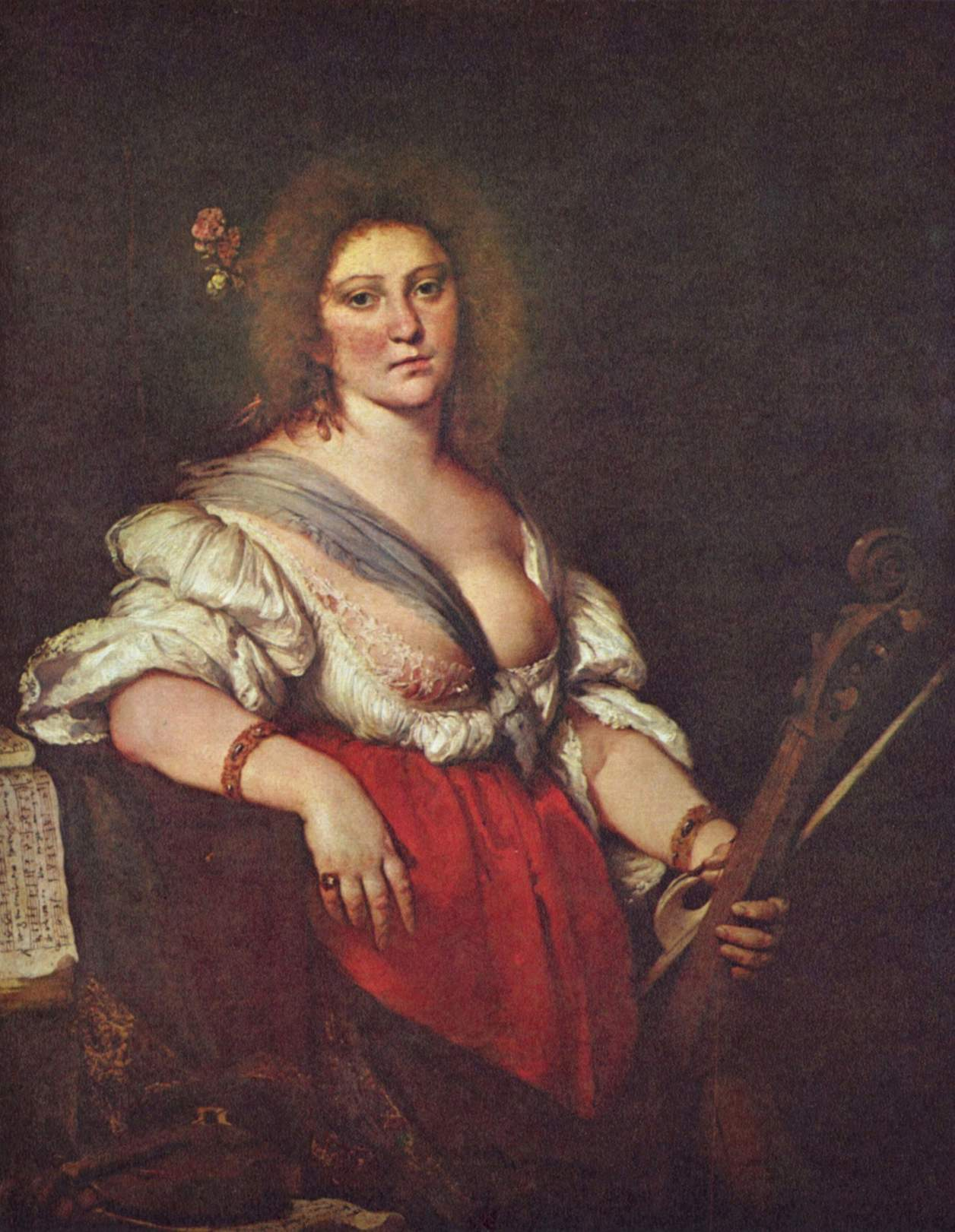
Barbara Strozzi

- January 8 – Sir John Fowell, 2nd Baronet, English politician (b. 1623)
- January 18 – Jan van Riebeeck, Dutch founder of Cape Town (b. 1619)
- January 31 – Frederick VI, Margrave of Baden-Durlach (b. 1617)
- February 9 – George Horner, English politician (b. 1605)
- February 21 – Baruch Spinoza, Dutch philosopher (b. 1632)
- March 18 – Marie Luise von Degenfeld, morganatic second wife of Charles I Louis, Elector Palatine of Germany (b. 1634)
- March 28 – Václav Hollar, Czech-born actor (b. 1607)
- April 22 – Václav Eusebius František, Prince of Lobkowicz, Austrian field marshal and prince (b. 1609)
- May 4 – Isaac Barrow, English mathematician (b. 1630)
- May 20 – George Digby, 2nd Earl of Bristol, English statesman (b. 1612)
- May 22 – William, Margrave of Baden-Baden (b. 1593)
- May 23 – John, Count of Nassau-Idstein (1629–1677) (b. 1603)
- May 24 – Anders Bording, Danish writer (b. 1619)
- June 11 – Jacques Esprit, French writer (b. 1611)
- June 23 – Wilhelm Ludwig, Duke of Württemberg (b. 1647)
- June 18 – Johann Franck, German poet and hymnist (b. 1618)
- June 26 – Francesco Buonamici, Italian architect, painter and engraver (b. 1596)
- July 11 – Timothy Turner, English judge, actor (b. 1585)
- July 27 – Johannes Loccenius, German historian (b. 1598)
- July 30 – Fabian von Fersen, Swedish soldier (b. 1626)
- August
  - Matthew Locke, English composer (b. 1621)
  - Joseph Pardo, English-Jewish hazzan (b. c. 1624)
- August 1 – George Christian, Landgrave of Hesse-Homburg (1669–1671) (b. 1626)
- August 20 – Pierre Petit, French astronomer, military engineer, and physicist (b. 1594)
- August 28 – Wallerant Vaillant, painter of the Dutch Golden Age (b. 1623)
- September 11 – James Harrington, English political philosopher (b. 1611)
- September 12
  - Tønne Huitfeldt, Norwegian landowner and military officer (b. 1625)
  - Camillo Massimo, Italian cardinal, patron of the arts (b. 1620)
- October 9 – Gustav Adolph, Count of Nassau-Saarbrücken and general sergeant of the Holy Roman Empire at the Rhine (b. 1632)
- October 14 – Józef Bartłomiej Zimorowic, Polish poet (b. 1597)
- November 2 – Robert Sidney, 2nd Earl of Leicester, English politician (b. 1595)
- November 9 – Aernout van der Neer, Dutch painter (b. 1603)
- November 11
  - Johann Weikhard of Auersperg, Austrian prime minister (b. 1615)
  - Barbara Strozzi, Italian singer and composer (b. 1619)
- November 14 – Matthias Abele, Austrian jurist, mine official (b. 1618)
- December 13 – Thomas Howard, 5th Duke of Norfolk, English noble (b. 1627)
- December 14 – Christian Albert, Burgrave and Count of Dohna, German nobleman and general in the army of Brandenburg (b. 1621)
- December 26 – Bernhard Gustav of Baden-Durlach, Swedish general, Prince-Abbot and cardinal (b. 1631)
- date unknown – Gilbert Sheldon, Archbishop of Canterbury (b. 1598)
