= Garrod =

Garrod is a surname, and may refer to:

- Alfred Baring Garrod (1819–1907), English physician
- Alfred Henry Garrod (1846–1879), English vertebrate zoologist
- Archibald Garrod (1857–1936), British physician
- Dorothy Garrod (1892–1968), British archaeologist, daughter of Archibald Garrod
- Guy Garrod (1891–1965), British RAF officer
- H. W. Garrod (1878–1960), British scholar
- Lawrence Paul Garrod (1895–1979), British bacteriologist

== See also ==
- Harrod (disambiguation)
