= Historia Histrionica =

1699 literary work by James Wright

Historia Histrionica is a 1699 literary work by James Wright (1643-1713), on the subject of theatre in England in the seventeenth century. It is an essential resource for information on the actors and theatrical life of the period, providing data available nowhere else.

== Full title and original publication ==
The work's full title is Historia Histrionica: An historical account of the English stage shewing the ancient use, improvement, and perfection of dramatick representations in this nation. In a dialogue of plays and players. The original 1699 octavo edition, published anonymously, was printed by G. Groom for the bookseller William Hawes. (His shop was at the sign of the Rose, in Ludgate Street.)

== Dialogue form ==
As its title indicates, the work is cast in the form of a dialogue between two abstract figures, Lovewit and Trueman; Trueman imparts to Lovewit (and to the reader) his knowledge of theatrical matters. The author, James Wright (1643–1713), was an attorney and occasional poet, and a collector of old plays. Along with Gerard Langbaine and John Downes, Wright was one of the earliest historians of British theatre.

== Reprint and impact ==
Historia Histrionica was reprinted in the twelfth volume of Robert Dodsley's collection of old plays, and included in subsequent editions of that work. Wright's essay remains a valuable resource for modern scholars of the subject and the period.

== Similar work by the same writer ==
James Wright also published Country Conversations (1694), in which he compares late seventeenth-century theatre to earlier theatre by William Shakespeare, Ben Jonson, Philip Massinger, and others.
