= Herod =

Herod may refer to:

== Members of the Herodian dynasty ==
Members of the Herodian dynasty, named after Herod the Great, in chronological order:

- Herod the Great (born c. 74 BC, ruled 37–4 BC or 1 BC), client king of Judea who expanded the Second Temple in Jerusalem and, according to the New Testament, orders the Massacre of the Innocents
- Herod II or Herod Philip I (c. 27 BC–33 AD), father of the Salome in Mark 6:21-29, did not rule over any territory
- Herod Archelaus (23 BC–c. AD 18, ruled 4 BC–AD 6), ethnarch of Samaria, Judea, and Idumea
- Herod Antipas (born 21 BC, ruled 4 BC–AD 39), tetrarch of Galilee and Peraea and in the New Testament orders the death of John the Baptist and mocks Jesus
- Philip the Tetrarch, sometimes incorrectly called Herod Philip II, (born c. 20 BC, ruled 4 BC–AD 34), tetrarch of Iturea, Trachonitis, and Batanaea
- Herod Agrippa (born c. 11 BC, ruled AD 41–44), client king of Judaea, called "King Herod" or "Herod" in Acts 12 of the New Testament
- Herod of Chalcis (died AD 48), also known as Herod II or Herod V, king of Chalcis (r. AD 41–48)
- Herod Agrippa II (born AD 27, ruled 48–c. 92), ruled Chalcis and described in Acts 25 of the New Testament as "King Agrippa" before whom Paul the Apostle defended himself

== US places ==
- Averitt-Herod House, historic house in Hartsville, Tennessee
- Herod, Illinois, United States
- Herod Run, a stream in Pennsylvania
- Herods Run, a stream in West Virginia

== Other ==
- Herod (band), a heavy metal band from the United States
- Herod (horse), a thoroughbred racehorse
- Hérode et Mariamne, a tragedy by Voltaire
- Like Herod, a song by Scottish post-rock band Mogwai

== See also ==
- Herodian dynasty
- Harrod (disambiguation)
- Herodes Atticus (AD 101–177), a Greek aristocrat not related to the Herodian Dynasty who served as a Roman senator and proponent of Sophism
- Herred, an administrative area in Denmark and Norway
- Herodian (disambiguation)
- Herrod (disambiguation)
- Orodes (disambiguation)
