= Felton Head =

Headland in Enderby Land, Antarctica

Felton Head (67°17′S 46°59′E) is a flat-topped, dark brown headland with a sheer seaward side, standing 3.5 nautical miles (6 km) east of Harrop Island on the coast of Enderby Land, Antarctica. It was plotted from air photos taken by the Australian National Antarctic Research Expeditions in 1956, and was named for Sergeant Kevin Felton, Royal Australian Air Force, an engine fitter at Mawson Station in 1960.
