= Orodes =

Male given name of Iranian origin

- Gender: male

Origin
- Language: Middle Iranian
- Meaning: Uncertain
- Region of origin: Greater Iran

Other names
- Variant forms: Ouorodes; Hyrodes; Worod; Worodes; Vorod; Vorodes; Urud; Viru
- Derivative: Herod
- Derived: Uncertain

Orodes is the Latinized form of a male given name of Middle Iranian origin popularized by Parthians. In Greek it is recorded as Orōdēs (Ὀρώδης), Hērōdēs (Ἡρώδης), Hurōdēs (Ὑρώδης, in Latin: Hyrōdēs), and once as Ouorōdēs (Οὐορώδην). It is recorded in Shapur I's trilingual inscription at the Ka'ba-ye Zartosht as Greek (§67) Ouorōd (Οὐορωδ), Middle Persian (§35) wyrwd (𐭥𐭩𐭥𐭥𐭣 Wērōy, Wīroy, Wirōy) and Parthian (§28) wrwd (𐭅𐭓𐭅𐭃 Wērōd, Urūd). The older form is probably Wērōd, supposedly developed into a regional Werōd, and later Worōd. The Middle Persian is also recorded with the spelling wyrwy and wylwd. It is recorded in New Persian as Wērō (ویرو, "Viru"), name of a character in Vis o Ramin, a romance of Parthian origin.

The name is recorded as wrwd in Syriac and Aramaic texts from Egypt (spelled wrd instead), Elymais, Palmyra, Hatra, Dura-Europos, and possibly Assur. The Parthian name is also attested in Late Babylonian (^{m}ú-ru-da-a).

The etymology of the word is disputed.

People named Orodes include:

Kings of Parthia:

- Orodes I of Parthia (died 75 BC)
- Orodes II of Parthia (died 37 BC)
- Orodes III of Parthia (died 6 AD)

Kings of Elymais:

- Orodes I of Elymais, reigned c. 50-100 AD?
- Orodes II of Elymais, son and successor of Orodes I
- Orodes III (fl. 2nd century)
- Orodes IV of Elymais, reigned beginning sometime between 165-170 AD?
- Orodes V (fl. 3rd century)

Others:

- Orodes of Armenia, Roman client king of Armenia in 35 AD and from 37 until 42

== See also ==
- Septimius Worod, a Palmyrene official
- Worod, a king of the Kingdom of Hatra
- Herod (disambiguation)
