= Abraham Wright (deacon) =

English theological writer and deacon (1611–1690)

Abraham Wright (23 December 1611 – 9 May 1690) was an English theological writer and deacon.

== Life ==
Wright was sent to the Mercers' chapel school in Cheapside, and was afterwards from 1626 at Merchant Taylors' school. He was elected scholar of St John's College, Oxford, on 11 June 1629, and matriculated on 13 November. He was especially favoured by William Juxon for his good elocution. He was elected fellow of his college in 1632, graduated B.A. on 16 May 1633, and M.A. on 22 April 1637.

When William Laud received Charles I in St. John's on 30 August 1636, Wright delivered the speech welcoming the king to the new library, and after dinner he acted in the play Love's Hospital, by George Wilde, before the king and queen. St. John's had long been famous for its plays. Wright is said himself to have written a comic interlude called The Reformation, acted at St. John's about 1631.

== Deaconry ==
On 27 September 1637, Wright was ordained deacon by Francis White (1564?–1638), Bishop of Ely, in the chapel of Ely House. In the same year he published at Oxford a collection of sixteenth and seventeenth century epigrams, which he called ‘Delitiæ Delitiarum.’ On 22 Dec. 1639 he was ordained priest by Bancroft, bishop of Oxford, in Christ Church Cathedral. He soon became a popular preacher, and preached before the king, before the university, and at St. Paul's (Wood, Athenæ Oxon. iv. 275; cf. Hist. MSS. Comm. 2nd Rep. App. i. 79).

In August 1645, he was presented to the vicarage of Oakham, Rutland, by Juxon, his constant patron, but he was not inducted, as he refused to take the covenant (cf. his poem to Juxon in Parnassus Biceps). He was expelled from his fellowship by the parliamentary commission (Wilson, Hist. of Merchant Taylors' School, ii. 728), and became tutor to the son of Sir James Grime or Graham at Peckham, and ‘read the common prayer on all Sundays and holy days, and on principal feasts he preached and administered. About 1655 he was prevailed with to leave Peckham and to live in London, where he was chosen by the parishioners of St. Olave in Silver Street to be their minister and to receive the profits of that little parish, of which he was in effect the rector, though formally to take actual possession of the living he would not (as his nearest relation hath told me), because he would avoid oaths and obligations’ (Wood, Athenæ Oxon.) He continued to minister there four years, according to the rites of the church of England, but was obliged to withdraw in 1659.

On the Restoration, he was offered a chaplaincy to Elizabeth of Bohemia, but he declined it and took possession of his living of Oakham. He refused several preferments and lived quietly in the country, busy with his parish and his garden (cf. Hist. MSS. Comm. 2nd Rep. i. 396, 398).

== Personal ==
Wright was the son of Richard Wright, silk-dyer, of London, was born in Black Swan Alley, Thames Street, 23 December 1611; apparently his father was the Richard Wright who was warden of the Merchant Taylors' Company, 1600–1, 1606–7, and master 1611–1612. He died on Friday, 9 May 1690, and was buried in Oakham church. He married, in 1643, Jane, daughter of James Stone of Yarnton, Oxfordshire. His son James (1643–1713) was a noted antiquary and man of letters.

== Works ==
Wright's works have each some peculiar interest. Besides the ‘Delitiæ Delitiarum’ and some lines in ‘Flos Britannicus,’ Oxford, 1636, he was author of:

1. Delitae Delitiarvm Sive Epigrammatvm Ex optimis quibusq[ue] hujus & novissimi seculi poetis in amplissima illa Bibliotheca Bodleiana ... in unam corollam connexa Opera, Publisher, Webb, 1637 online
2. ‘Novissima Straffordii,’ a highly eulogistic account of Wentworth, ‘in the style of Tacitus.’ This was printed by Dr. P. Bliss and Dr. B. Bandinel in ‘Historical Papers of the Roxburghe Club,’ pt. i. London, 1846. The editors say (p. vi): ‘We have seen a volume of manuscript collections made by Wright in his youth, probably when at college, which is here mentioned, because it contains some early and original criticisms on Shakespeare.’
3. ‘Parnassus Biceps, or severall choice pieces of Poetry, composed by the best wits that were in both of the Universities before their dissolution, with an epistle in the behalf of those now doubly secluded and sequestered members, by one who himself is none,’ London, 1656.
4. ‘Five Sermons,’ 1656; in the style respectively of Bishop Andrewes, Bishop Hall, Dr. Mayne, and Mr. Cartwright, the presbyterian way, and the independent way. These in his preface ‘to the Christian reader’ he declares to show ‘what a scholar may do more than a mere preacher, and that there is a vast difference between shop-board breeding and the Universities,’ and he disparages the ignorant preaching of the day.
5. ‘A Practical Commentary on the Psalms,’ 1661, London
6. ‘A practical commentary or exposition upon the Pentateuch,’ 1662, London. He left other manuscripts behind him (Wood, Athenæ Oxon.; some are among the manuscripts of Mr. Bromley-Davenport at Baginton).

== Notes ==
Attribution

This article incorporates text from a publication now in the public domain: Hutton, William Holden (1900). "Wright, Abraham". In Lee, Sidney (ed.). Dictionary of National Biography. Vol. 63. London: Smith, Elder & Co.
