= Charles Hopkins (poet) =

Anglo-Irish poet and dramatist

Charles Hopkins (1664?–1700?) was an Anglo-Irish poet and dramatist.

== Life ==
The elder son of Ezekiel Hopkins, bishop of Derry, Charles Hopkins was born about 1664 at Exeter and was taken early to Ireland. He was educated at Trinity College, Dublin, and then at Queens' College, Cambridge, where he graduated B.A. 1688.

Returning to Ireland, Hopkins engaged in military service. He subsequently settled in England, and gained some reputation as a writer of poems and plays. Giles Jacob in the Poetical Register says that Hopkins might have made a fortune in any scene of life, but was unmotivated. His death aged 35, about the beginning of 1700, was put down to a debauched lifestyle.

== Works ==
John Dryden, in a letter to Mrs. Steward (7 November 1699), described Hopkins as "a poet who writes good verses without knowing how or why; I mean, he writes naturally well, without art or learning or good sense."

He wrote:

- Epistolary Poems; on several Occasions: With several of the Choicest Stories of Ovid's Metamorphoses and Tibullus's Elegies, London, 1694, dedicated to Anthony Hammond. One of the epistles is addressed to the Earl of Dorset; another to Walter Moyle.
- The History of Love. A Poem: in a letter to a Lady, London, 1695, dedicated to Isabella FitzRoy, Duchess of Grafton; translations from Ovid's Metamorphoses and Heroides.
- The Art of Love: In two Books dedicated to the ladies, London, a paraphrase of portions of Ovid's Ars Amatoria.
- Whitehall; or the Court of England: A Poem, Dublin, 1698, dedicated to the Duchess of Ormonde; reprinted in Dryden's Miscellany Poems under the title of The Court Prospect.

Hopkins was also the author of four tragedies, three performed at Lincoln's Inn Fields:

- Pyrrhus, King of Epirus, 1695, to which William Congreve contributed a prologue.
- Neglected Virtue, 1696.
- Boadicea, Queen of Britain, 1697.
- Friendship Improved, or the Female Warrior, 1699.

Before Friendship Improved there is a dedicatory epistle, written from Londonderry (to Edward Coke of Norfolk), in which the author refers to his failing health: "My Muse is confined at present to a weak and sickly tenement; and the winter season will go near to overbear her, together with her household." In John Nichols's Collection of Poems are preserved some verses written by Hopkins "about an hour before his death".
