= George A. Harrop =

American physician (1890–1945)

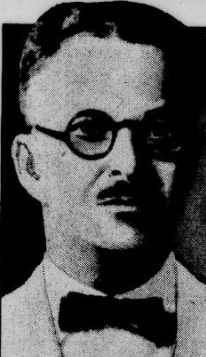
- Born: November 5, 1890; Peru, Illinois, U.S.
- Died: August 4, 1945 (aged 54)
- Occupations: Physician, writer

George Argale Harrop (November 5, 1890 – August 4, 1945) was an American physician, nutritionist and writer.

== Biography ==
Harrop was born in Peru, Illinois. During 1908–1910 he was educated at University of Wisconsin. He transferred to Harvard University and received his Bachelor of Arts degree in 1912.

Harrop attended the Medical School of the Johns Hopkins University and received his Doctorate of Medicine in 1916. He worked as assistant resident in medicine at the Johns Hopkins Hospital (1916–1920) and was resident physician at Columbia University (1923–1924). He was associate professor of medicine from 1925 to 1938 at the Johns Hopkins Hospital. He published many papers on clinical medicine, metabolism and nutrition. He did pioneering research on the mineralocorticoid action of the adrenal cortex.

In 1938, he became the director of research of the Squibb Institute for Medical Research at New Brunswick, New Jersey. He married Esther Caldwell in China in 1924; they had three sons and a daughter.

== Banana and skimmed milk diet ==
Harrop invented the banana and skimmed milk diet for weight loss in obese patients. He published his results in the Journal of the American Medical Association in 1934. The diet recommended taking six bananas with 1000 cubic centimetres (4 glassfuls) of skimmed milk each day. Three or more meals were to be eaten each day, one with cabbage or lettuce. The diet was followed for ten days and was said to produce a weight loss of four to nine pounds. Harrop recommended adding eggs, fish and lean meat to the diet after ten days.

The majority of Harrop's patients lost weight; however, the diet was not tested on a large enough group of patients to define its practical value. The United Fruit Company popularized the diet and it was declared to be the most popular American fad diet in 1934. Physician Morris Fishbein commented that "many people found it difficult to follow because they could not tolerate milk and the diet was also criticized because of its tendency to produce constipation."

== Selected publications ==
- Management of Diabetes: Treatment by Dietary Regulation and the Use of Insulin (P. B. Hoeber, 1924)
- Diet in Disease (P. Blakiston's Son & Company, 1930)
- Harrop, George A. (1934). A Milk and Banana Diet for the Treatment of Obesity. Journal of the American Medical Association 102 (24): 2003–2005.
- Harrop, George A; Struve, Mildred. (1934). The Banana in the Management of Obesity. The American Journal of Nursing 34 (7): 685–694.
