= James Wright (antiquarian) =

17th/18th-century English antiquarian and writer

James Wright (1643–1713), was an antiquary and writer, author of a county history of Rutland (1684), and the Historia Histrionica (1699), an account of theatre in England in the seventeenth century.

== Early life and education ==
Wright was the son of Abraham Wright, by his wife Jane (d. 1645), daughter of James Stone. He was born at Yarnton, Oxfordshire, where he was baptised in 1643.

He did not attend either Oxford or Cambridge, but in 1666 became a student of New Inn, migrating in 1669 to the Middle Temple, by which society he was called to the bar in 1672.

== Interests ==
"During the fluctuations of government and afterwards", says Thomas Warton, "he was attached to the principles of monarchy in their most extensive comprehension, and from this circumstance he might have derived his predilection for the theatre which had been suppressed by the republicans." Besides the theatre he was much attached to country life, and dwelt often with his father at Oakham. He was "a skilful antiquary and not a bad poet", and possessed many rare and valuable old manuscripts, being "one of the first collectors of old plays since Cartwright"; but all his literary curiosities, among which was an excellent transcript of John Leland's Itinerary of the age of Queen Elizabeth, were unfortunately consumed in the fire of the Middle Temple of 1678. (Hearne, Collections, ii. 227). Thomas Hearne wrote of him in October 1713 as recently dead. He adds that he had been told that Wright had "dyed a papist, and yt he continued always so from his first turning, which was I hear in K. Charles IInd's time".

== Works ==
A versatile writer with a lucid style and a genuine touch of humour, especially as an essayist, Wright was author of:

- The History and Antiquities of the County of Rutland … illustrated with Sculptures, London, 1684. In dedicating this work to the "Nobility and Gentry of the County", Wright especially mentions the encouragement he received from William Dugdale, and the admission, which he greatly prized, to the Cotton library. Nine pages of "Additions" appeared in 1687; and "Farther Additions, with a view of Burley-on-the-Hill" (8 pp.) in 1714. Two numbers (36 pp.) of a new edition by William Harrod appeared in 1788.
- A Compendious View of the late Tumults and Troubles in this Kingdom, by way of Annals, 1685. This is a succinct account of the period of the Popish Plot (1678–84), dedicated to Henry Hyde, 2nd Earl of Clarendon, and containing a warm testimonial to the good qualities of Sir Roger L'Estrange.
- Country Conversations: Being an Account of some Discourses that happen'd in a visit to the Country last Summer on divers Subjects; chiefly of the Modern Comedies, of Drinking, of Translated Verse, of Painting and Painters, of Poets and Poetry, London, 1694.
- Three Poems of St. Paul's Cathedral: viz. The Ruins, The Rebuilding, The Choire, London, 1697. The poem on "The Ruins" had been issued separately in 1668.
- Historia Histrionica: an Historical Account of the English Stage, shewing the Ancient Use, Improvement, and Perfection of Dramatick Representations in this Nation. In a Dialogue of Plays and Players, London, 1699. This sketch of the "transition" stage was incorporated (as a preface to vol. xi.) into Robert Dodsley's Old English Plays, 1744. It assumes the form of a dialogue between Lovewit and an old cavalier, who discourses amiably upon old plays and old actors such as Lowin and Pollard, Taylor, a notable Hamlet, and Swanston, who played Othello "before the wars".
- Phoenix Paulina: a Poem on the New Fabrick of St. Paul's Cathedral, London, 1709; published anonymously, but referred to as being by Wright in a manuscript note by Thomas Hearne in the Bodleian copy.
- Wright is further credited with translations from the Latin and French: Thyestes, a Tragedy translated out of Seneca; to which is added Mock-Thyestes in burlesque, 1674; and The New Description of Paris, in two parts, London, 1687.

Besides these works, Wright prepared an accurate epitome in English of William Dugdale's Monasticon (London, 1693), in the dedication of which he remarks: "Warwickshire has produced two of the most famous and deserving writers in their several ways that England can boast of—a Dugdale and a Shakespeare." Anthony Wood cites a distich of an elegy written by Wright upon John Goad. Hearne, who respected Wright, having corresponded with him upon the subject of Leland, informs us that he wrote strictures upon Wood's Athenae, but never published them. From a manuscript entry by Hearne, dated 1719, in Dr. Rawlinson's copy of Wright's Ruins in St. Paul's Cathedral, it appears that Wright, a few years before his death, gave Hearne a complete catalogue of his works; and that upon a previous application he had at a former date refused this favour to Wood as being "an injudicious and partial biographer".

William Hazlitt doubtfully attributes to Wright a volume of translations entitled Sales Epigrammatum: Being the choycest Distichs of Martials Fourteen Books of Epigrams & of all the Chief Latin Poets that have writ in these two last Centuries. Together with Cato's Morality, London, 1663, and 1664: this volume is dedicated to Sir William Bromley in June 1663 by "James Wright M. Arts". The same signature is affixed to a version of Ovid's Epistles, 1683.
