= Herodian (commander) =

- Ἡρωδιανός
- Military career
- Allegiance: Byzantine Empire
- Branch: Byzantium Army
- Rank: Commander

Herodian (Greek: Ἡρωδιανός) was an officer in the Byzantine army during the rule of Justinian I. He served under Belisarius during the Gothic War, remaining in Italy after the later's departure. He later surrendered Spolitium to Totila.
