= Bob Herrod =

English footballer

Personal information
- Full name: Edwin Robert Herrod
- Date of birth: 1866
- Place of birth: Radford, Nottingham, England
- Date of death: 1918 (aged 52)
- Place of death: Derby, England
- Positions: Inside right; outside right

Senior career*
Years	Team	Apps	(Gls)
?−1890	Derby St Luke's		
1890–1891	Doncaster Rovers		(10)
1891	Leicester Fosse	7	(0)
1891–?	Rotherham Town		
- Derby Town
- * Club domestic league appearances and goals

Edwin Robert Herrod (1866–1918), born in Radford, Nottingham, was an English footballer who played as a forward.

As a 15-year-old, he lived in Derby earning his living as a gimp maker.

After moving from Derby St Luke's, he became a top scoring winger for Doncaster Rovers in the Midland Alliance for the 1890–91 season, netting 14 times in all League and cup games. This attracted attention from Leicester Fosse from the Midland League who signed him in September 1891.

After one goal in eight games, he moved to Rotherham Town. He scored in a record 11–0 defeat of Leicester in April 1892, where Leicester were disadvantaged by having to play with only ten men as a player did not turn up. He later played for Derby Town.

== Honours ==
Doncaster Rovers

- Midland Alliance League

Runner up: 1890–91

- Sheffield and Hallamshire Senior Cup

Champions: 1890–91
