= Jeffrey Harrod =

- Born: 16 February 1935 (age 91); London
- Occupations: Writer, essayist, journalist, university professor
- Known for: Publications/media presentations on: global political economy, corporate power, labour relations theory
- Website: www.jeffreyharrod.eu

Jeffrey Harrod is a writer and essayist on politics and international political economy and known for his work on the power of corporations and the position of labour in international economic relations. He has been critical of global approaches which reduce the importance of nation-states. Working with Robert W. Cox a power dynamics approach to the political economy of work was developed. Harrod's application of this approach to those in low-waged or precarious employment is currently used by researchers in those fields. Since 2012 he has maintained a blog and in 2016 published his first novel, After Man.

He is professor emeritus from Erasmus University, Rotterdam, and visiting professor emeritus, University of Amsterdam, Amsterdam, the Netherlands.

== Biography ==
=== Academic ===
Harrod was born in London, England and started work as an office boy at age 15 and later worked as a London bus conductor. After two years compulsory military service he graduated in international law from University College London, international relations from Lehigh University, Pennsylvania and with a Ph.D. (political science-international relations) from the University of Geneva's Graduate Institute of International Studies, in Switzerland. He has held academic positions at the University of West Indies, Jamaica, University College London, University of Colorado, University of Amsterdam and the International Institute of Social Studies, Erasmus University where he held the chair of International and Comparative Labour Studies and became deputy rector.

=== International trade unionism ===
He was a foreign correspondent for international economic affairs for the trade newspapers of Fairchild Publications before joining the United Nations International Labour Organisation as research coordinator at its Institute for Social Studies. Subsequently, Harrod became permanent consultant for research and publications for the International Federation of Chemical, Energy and General Workers' Unions (ICEF) (an international trade union) where he worked with Charles Levinson and Vic Thorpe producing books, annual reports on world social economy and industry bulletins. As ICEM resource person he provided lectures and consultations to unions, movements and political parties in, Philippines, Malaysia, Indonesia, Thailand, South Korea, Bulgaria and Pakistan.

== Writing and research ==
=== Political economy of work and labour ===
Harrod and Robert Cox worked together on a power dynamics approach to what was conventionally called labour relations or industrial relations. It was launched in the companion volumes by Robert Cox and Harrod – Harrod's Power, Production and the Unprotected Worker (1987) and part 1 of Cox's Production, Power and the Making of World Order (1987). In this approach work and labour are viewed through different patterns of power found in forms of production ranging from peasant to corporate throughout the world. Both Cox and Harrod used this view in their teaching and work in international political economy. Harrod continued to revise and develop the original approach and other researchers expanded its use in the study of world politics. Cox and Harrod have together been criticised for bias for their selective use of Marxian concepts.

=== Global political economy ===
Harrod's work in global political economy involves the power interplay between types of labour relations, corporations and non-governmental organisations. His Trade Union Foreign Policy (1972) revealed that foreign trade unions accepted corporate strategies aimed at labour in bauxite mining in Jamaica. Similar corporate strategies were shown in Asbestos: The Politics and Economics of a Lethal Substance (1990) (with Vic Thorpe). Harrod's book on Labour and Third World Debt (1994), which detailed how the policies of international economic agencies and corporations dealing with foreign debt involved labour in the global south, was translated from English into Danish, Spanish and Urdu. He has continued to focus on the social, political and geo-political problems raised by the corporation as an institutional power at both the domestic and international levels. Harrod posted in 2012, under the CC BY-NC-SA 4.0 license, a complete online course on Global Political Economy.

== Bibliography ==
Single-authored books

- (2024) De Avonturen van Rossie de Uil (die in Scheveningen woont): translated from English by Peter de Valk: The Hague: Uitgeverij U2pi ISBN 978-90-823957-6-1
- (2018) The Adventures of Ginger the Owl (who lives in Scheveningen): The Hague: Uitgeverij U2pi ISBN 978-90-823957-1-6
- (2016) After Man The Hague: Uitgeverij U2pi ISBN 978-90-823957-3-0
- (1992) Labour and Third World Debt Brussels: ICEF English edition 1992, Spanish Edition, 1993 Danish Edition, 1994 Urdu Edition, 1996 (published by PILER, Karachi, Pakistan (1992)
- (1987) Power Production and the Unprotected Worker New York: Columbia University Press, ISBN 0-231-05844-6: https://www.researchgate.net/publication/329309632
- (1972) Trade Union Foreign Policy: British and American Trade Unions in Jamaica London: Macmillan ISBN 0-33313464-8 : New York: Anchor Edition Doubleday ISBN 0-385-02485-1

Dual-authored books

- (2000) Facing Global Power: Strategies for Global Unionism (with V. Thorpe) Brussels: ICEM
- (1985) Asbestos: The Politics and Economics of a Lethal Substance (with V. Thorpe) Geneva: ICEM)
- (1972) Future Industrial Relations: An Interim Report (with R. Cox) Geneva: International Institute for Labour Studies

Edited books

- (2002) Global Unions? Theory and Strategy of Organized Labour in the Global Political Economy edited by J. Harrod and R. O’Brien, London: Routledge ISBN 0-415-27008-1 pbk
- (1995) Industrialisation and Labor Relations: Contemporary Research in Seven Countries edited by S. Frenkel and J. Harrod New York: ILR Press, Cornell University ISBN 0-87546-339-8
- (1988) The United Nations Under Attack edited by J. Harrod and N. Schrijver, London: Gower, {{ISBN|0}} 566 05695 X

Selected articles

- (2019) "The Changing Power of the Twenty-First-Century Corporation" in Hofferberth, Matthias (editor) Corporate Actors in Global Governance: Business as Usual or New Deal? Lynne Rienner Publishers ISBN 978-1-62637-803-2, pp 225–248
- (2015) "Work, Power and the Urban Poor" in van der Pijl, Kees (ed) Handbook of International Political Economy of Production Edward Elgar ISBN 978-1-78347-021-1 pp. 283–298
- (2014) "Patterns of Power Relations: Sabotage, Organisation, Conformity and Adjustment" in Global Labour Journal 5 (2)https://mulpress.mcmaster.ca/globallabour/article/view/1155
- (2008) "The International Labour Organisation and the World Labour Force: From "Peoples of the World" to "Informal Sector" https://www.researchgate.net/publication/329309643
- (2006) "The Global Poor and Global Politics: Neo-Materialism and the Sources of Political Action" in M. Davies, M and Ryner, M (eds) Poverty and the Production of World Politics New York: Palgrave-Macmillan ISBN 978-0-230-80087-8
- (1995) "Labor, Management and Industrialisation: Themes and Issues in International Perspective" with S.Frenkel, in S. Frenkel and J. Harrod (eds) Industrialisation and Labor Relations: Contemporary Research in Seven Countries New York: ILR Press, Cornell University pp. 3–20
- (1988) "The United Nations Social Activities: From Functionalist Intervention International Cooperation?" in J.Harrod, N. Schrijver (eds), The United Nations Under Attack London: Gower, pp. 130–144
- (1972) "Multinational Corporations, Trade Unions and Industrial Relations" in H. Gunter (ed), Transnational Industrial Relations London: Macmillan pp. 173–194.

Selected blog posts and essays

- (2020) "Corporatism: 21st Century Governing System? : Feudalism, Capitalism Corporatism (essay) https://jeffreyharrod.blogspot.com/2020/05/
- (2019) "The Strange Case of the Imploding British Elite" (post) https://jeffreyharrod.blogspot.com/2019/10/
- (2017) "Global, Growth and Corporatism versus Local, Sustainable and Participation: Fictitious interviews with CEO of a corporation and a Secretary General of Social Action Group"(script-essay) https://jeffreyharrod.blogspot.com/2017/01/
- (2011) "Global Weimarism: Why the centre cannot hold" (essay) https://jeffreyharrod.blogspot.com/2011/11/
- (2009) "The Global Economy -Yuppies Whoopies, Poppies and Ninjas", (post) https://jeffreyharrod.blogspot.com/2009/12/

On-line presentations

- (2015) "Politics of Corporate Investment Trade and Global Governance" (48 slides) https://www.slideshare.net/harrod/politics-of-corporate-investment-trade-and-global-governancebp
- (2014) "Global Political Economy: How the World Works"(153 slides) https://www.slideshare.net/harrod/global-political-economy-how-the-world-words
- (2014)"IMF and the Africanisation of Southern Europe" (12 slides) https://www.slideshare.net/harrod/imf-and-africanisation-of-southern-europe
