= Harrop Island =

Island in Enderby Land, Antarctica

- Location within Antarctica

Geography
- Location: Antarctica
- Coordinates: 67°16′S 46°52′E

Administration
- Administered under the Antarctic Treaty System

Demographics
- Population: Uninhabited

Harrop Island is a small island lying close to the coast and 6 kilometres (3 nmi) northwest of Felton Head, Enderby Land, Antarctica. It was plotted from air photos taken from Australian National Antarctic Research Expeditions aircraft in 1956, and was named by the Antarctic Names Committee of Australia for J.R. Harrop, a weather observer at Wilkes Station in 1960.

== See also ==
- List of Antarctic and sub-Antarctic islands
