= Andreas Tscherning =

German poet, hymn writer and literary theorist

Andreas Tscherning (18 November 1611 – 27 September 1659) was a German poet, hymn writer and literary theorist in the tradition of Martin Opitz.

== Career ==
Tscherning was born in Bunzlau (today Bolesławiec in Poland). He had to change school and universities frequently, due to the Thirty Years War. He attended high school in Görlitz and continued his studies from 1631 to 1635 in Breslau. From 1635 to 1636 he studied philology and philosophy at the University of Rostock. After this he earned his living as a private tutor in Wrocław, and was an associate of the poet-composer Matthäus Apelt. In 1641, he authored Centuria Proverbiorum Alis Imperatoris Muslemici distichis Latino-Germanicis expressa ab Andrea Tscherningio Cum Notis, the first German translation of Arabic poetry. He subsequently returned to Rostock, where he finished his studies with a master's exam and from 1644 was the successor of Peter Lauremberg as Professor of Poetry. He died in Rostock.

He emerged as a poet, publishing volumes such as Deutscher Gedichte Frühling (Spring of German Poems, 1642), Vortrab des Sommers deutscher Gedichte (1655), and Unvorgreifliches Bedenken über etliche Mißbräuche in der deutschen Schreib- und Sprachkunst, insonderheit der edlen Poeterei (1659). Some of his poems were included in Protestant church hymnals, such as "Du sollst in allen Sachen mit Gott den Anfang machen".

In 1642, still during the war, Tscherning published in Deutscher Gedichte Frühling a poem Liebet Friede (Love peace). Avoiding his own situation as well as a certain incident and political circumstances in general, the poem observes the rules by Opitz for a reformed poetry in format, rhyme and strictly German language. The meter and form correspond to a logical thread of thinking: the first of five stanzas requests the love of peace, in contrast to Hass und Streiten (Hate and battle), because of God's will as the ultimate reason. The second stanza points out that Christ gained peace by his death, which man should accept by loving peace. In contrast, stanzas 3 and 4 show how man destroys his own well-being by acts of fighting. The final stanza summarizes the arguments.

== Poem ==
Ein Baum redet den Menschen an

Was mit hat der Herbst genommen
Kan ich wieder neu bekommen
wann deß Frülings Vater bläst.
Mensch / du kriegest auff begehr
Deinen Geist nicht wieder her
Wann er einmal dich verläst.

Meine starcke Wurtzeln machen
Daß ich mag der Winde lachen:
Du hingegen sinckest hin
Wann nur etwan über feld
Sud nicht gleiches wetter helt
oder böse dünste ziehn.

Bin ich einmal gut beklieben
Und für schaden frey geblieben
So besteh' ich lange frist
Aber du wirst abgemeyt
Offt in deiner frülingszeit
Wann du kum gebohren bist.

A Tree Addresses a Person

What autumn took with it
I can get again anew
When Spring's father blows.
Man, even if you want it,
you don't get your spirit again
Once he has left you.

My strong roots make
That I may laugh at the winds.
You, however, sink fading
When only over the field
South does not hold even weather
Or evil hazes float.

When I am once well planted (lit: glued)
And remained free of damage,
So I remain for long.
But you may be mown
Often in your springtime
When you have barely been born.

== Literature ==
- Susanne Schulte (1997). "Andreas Tscherning". In Bautz, Traugott (ed.). Biographisch-Bibliographisches Kirchenlexikon (BBKL) (in German). Vol. 12. Herzberg: Bautz. cols. 649–655. ISBN 3-88309-068-9.
- Borcherdt, Hans-Heinrich : Andreas Tscherning. Ein Beitrag zur Literatur- und Kulturgeschichte des 17. Jahrhunderts. München 1912.
- Bornemann, Ulrich: "Dirck Volkertszoon Coornhert und Tscherning", in: Daphnis 19 (1990), 493-509.
- Dünnhaupt, Gerhard: Andreas Tscherning (1611-1659), in: Personalbibliographien zu den Drucken des Barock, Bd. 6. Hiersemann, Stuttgart 1993, ISBN 3-7772-9305-9, S. 4103-4134 (Werk- und Literaturverzeichnis)
- Hildebrandt-Günther, Renate: Antike Rhetorik und deutsche literarische Theorie im 17. Jahrhundert. Marburg 1966.
- McDonald, Grantley : ‘The Emblem of Melancholy in Seventeenth-Century Germany: Andreas Tscherning’s Melancholey Redet selber’, in Melancholie—zwischen Attitüde und Diskurs. Konzepte in Mittelalter und Früher Neuzeit, ed. Andrea Sieber and Antje Wittstock (Göttingen: Vandenhoeck & Ruprecht, 2009), 95-118.
