= John Harrop (cricketer) =

English cricketer

Personal information
- Full name: Douglas John Harrop
- Born: 16 April 1947; Cosby, Leicestershire, England
- Died: 26 November 2024 (aged 77); Leicester, England
- Batting: Left-handed
- Role: Wicket-keeper

Domestic team information
- Years: Team
- 1972: Leicestershire

Career statistics
Competition	First-class
Matches	1
Runs scored	11
Batting average	11.00
100s/50s	0/0
Top score	11*
Catches/stumpings	3/–
- Source: Cricinfo, 29 June 2012

Douglas John Harrop (16 April 1947 – 26 November 2024) was an English cricketer. Harrop was a left-handed batsman who fielded as a wicket-keeper. He was born at Cosby, Leicestershire.

Harrop made a single first-class appearance for Leicestershire against Oxford University at the University Parks in 1972. Leicestershire won the toss and elected to bat first, making 289/9 declared, during which Harrop was dismissed for a duck by Michael Wagstaffe. Oxford University then responded in their first-innings by making 125 all out, during which Harrop took two catches from behind the stumps, catching behind David Williams and Wagstaffe. In their second-innings, Leicestershire made 149/5 declared, with Harrop ending the innings not out on 11. Set 314 for victory, Oxford University were dismissed for 269 in their second-innings chase, giving Leicestershire victory by 44 runs. During that innings, Harrop caught behind Wagstaffe for the second time in the match. This was his only major appearance for Leicestershire.
