= Brett Harrop =

Australian cricketer (born 1979)

Personal information
- Born: 11 December 1979 (age 46); Melbourne, Australia

Domestic team information
- Years: Team
- 2003: Victoria
- Source: Cricinfo, 12 December 2015

Brett Harrop (born 11 December 1979) is an Australian former cricketer. He played one first-class cricket match for Victoria in 2003. He became a physiotherapist after his cricket career, having worked for Bangladesh, New Zealand Women, Otago Volts, Victoria age-group teams and Kings XI Punjab. In January 2021, he was appointed as the physiotherapist of the Sri Lanka cricket team.

== See also ==
- List of Victoria first-class cricketers
