= Walter J. Johnson =

Walter J. Johnson (November 1, 1611 – September 30, 1703) was an English explorer and fur trader whose travels in the Delaware and Hudson River valleys helped to pave the way for further settlement. He had good friendships and business relationships with the Lenape and Mohawk people who inhabited the area at the time.
