= William Harrod =

William Harrod (1753 – 1 January 1819) was an English printer and antiquary, publishing histories of Stamford, Mansfield and Market Harborough.

== Life ==
Harrod was the eldest of five children of a printer and bookseller in Market Harborough, Leicestershire, who was also for many years master of the free school there. After working as a journeyman printer in London, Harrod opened in 1776 a business as printer, bookseller and stationer in Stamford, Lincolnshire He became an alderman, and from 1793 until its closure in 1795 he edited and printed a newspaper, the Stamford Herald, or, The Lincolnshire, Rutland, Leicestershire, Huntingdonshire and Northamptonshire Advertiser, a Whig rival to the established Stamford Mercury.

In 1799 he moved to Mansfield, Nottinghamshire where, finding little work, he printed handbills and billheads. After his father's death in December 1805 he returned to Market Harborough. He left the town in 1818, perhaps because of business or domestic difficulties; he died in Birmingham on 1 January 1819, and was buried at St Mary's Church, Whittall Street, Birmingham.

== Family ==
He married in 1779 Deborah, in her home parish of Bromley; they had six children, five of whom reached adulthood. After her death in 1808, he married Jane, and they had two children.

== Works ==
Harrod published histories of the three towns in which he successively carried on his business:

1. The Antiquities of Stamford and St. Martin's, compiled chiefly from the Annals of the Rev. Francis Peck, with Notes; to which is added the Present State, including Burghley, 1785. Harrod was assisted by a Stamford apothecary named John Lowe.
2. The History of Mansfield and its Environs. In two parts: I. Antiquities, including a description of two Roman Villas discovered by H. Rooke, Esqr., 1786. II. The Present State. With plates, 1801.
3. The History of Market-Harborough in Leicestershire, and its Vicinity, 1808. This used material from John Nichols' history of Leicestershire.

In 1788 Harrod projected an enlarged edition of James Wright's History and Antiquities of Rutlandshire but, attracting few subscriptions, the work was discontinued after the appearance of two numbers. The copper-plates and manuscripts were afterwards purchased by John Nichols. Thomas Barker, one of Harrod's patrons, contributed a history of Lyndon, Rutland, which formed one of the parts published.

During a contested election in Nottingham in 1803 he compiled Coke and Birch. The Paper-War carried on at the Nottingham Election, 1803; containing the whole of the Addresses, Songs, Squibs, &c., circulated by the contending parties, including the Books of Accidents and Chances.
