= Friendship Improved =

- Written by: Charles Hopkins
- Original language: English
- Genre: Tragedy

Premiere
- Date premiered: 7 November 1699
- Place premiered: Lincoln's Inn Fields Theatre

Friendship Improved, or the Female Warrior is a 1699 tragedy by the English writer Charles Hopkins.

The original Lincoln's Inn Fields cast included Thomas Betterton as Zoulis, John Verbruggen as Maherbal, Elizabeth Barry as Semanthe, Henrietta Moore as Cyllene, Anne Bracegirdle as Locris and Mary Porter as Orithyia.

== Bibliography ==
- Wagonheim, Sylvia Stoler. The Annals of English Drama 975-1700. Routledge, 2013.
- Watson, George. The New Cambridge Bibliography of English Literature: Volume 2, 1660–1800. Cambridge University Press, 1971.
