= Jacques Esprit =

French moralist and writer

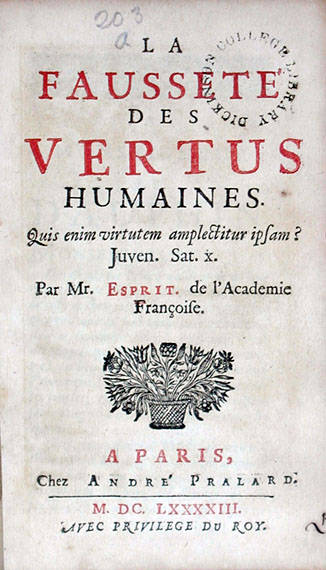
Le livre de Jacques Esprit.

Jacques Esprit (22 October 1611 – 11 June 1677), sometimes called abbé Esprit despite never having been ordained a priest, was a French moralist and writer.

== Biography ==
Born at Béziers, the son of a doctor from Toulouse, he joined his brother (an Oratorian priest) in Paris, where Jacques studied theology and letters from 1628 to 1634. He attended the salon of the marquise de Sablé and entered the service of the duchesse de Longueville then of the duc de La Rochefoucauld. Paul Pellisson wrote: "He had a happy appearance, a delicacy of spirit, an amiable disposition, playful, and with much facility in speaking well and writing well". His talents were noticed by Pierre Séguier, who rewarded him with a pension and made him a conseiller d'État in 1636. He was elected a member of the Académie française in 1639.

Falling into disgrace with Séguier in 1644, he took refuge in the Oratorian seminary. The prince de Conti visited and befriended him, lodging him in his hôtel and giving him 15,000 livres with which to get married. When the prince was made governor of the Languedoc in 1660, Jacques Esprit accompanied him and served him as intendant. On his benefactor's death in 1666, he returned to live in his birthplace of Béziers, where he educated his three daughters and edited a single work, La Fausseté des vertus humaines, and it was there that he died.

== La Fausseté des vertus humaines ==
La Fausseté des vertus humaines went through many editions and was translated into English in London in 1706 as Discourses on the Deceitfulness of Humane Virtues.

== List of works ==
- La Fausseté des vertus humaines (2 volumes, 1678; 1693; 1709). Online text. Reissue: Pascal Quignard, La Fausseté des vertus humaines, précédée de Traité sur Esprit, Aubier, Paris, 1996.
- L'Art de connoistre les hommes (1702). Édition abrégée de La Fausseté des vertus humaines.

== Bibliography ==
- Henri Berna, Pensées, maximes et sentences de Jacques Esprit : Considérations sur les vertus ordinaires, Ellipse, Genève, 2003.
